= 2020 in Namibia =

- Decades: 2000s; 2010s; 2020s
- See also: Other events of 2020; Timeline of Namibian history

Events in the year 2020 in Namibia.

== Incumbents ==
- President: Hage Geingob
- Vice President: Nangolo Mbumba
- Prime Minister: Saara Kuugongelwa-Amadhila
- Deputy-Prime Minister: Netumbo Nandi-Ndaitwah
- Chief Justice: Peter Shivute

== Events ==
- 14 March – The first reported cases of COVID-19 are announced by the Minister of Health and Social Services, Dr. Kalumbi Shangula. The first cases, a Romanian couple, arrived in Windhoek from Spain via Doha, Qatar, on 11 March.
- 17 March – President Hage Geingob declared a state of emergency which introduced measures such as the closure of all borders, suspension of gatherings and economic related resolutions.
- 28 March – The country went into lockdown in order to prevent the spread of COVID-19.
- 26 July – Twaloloka fire in Walvis Bay.
- ShutItAllDown - The Gender Based Violence Protests in October 2020.

== See also ==
- COVID-19 pandemic in Namibia
- COVID-19 pandemic in Africa
- 2020 in Southern Africa
- 2020 in Angola
- 2020 in South Africa
- 2020 in Zambia
- 2020 in Zimbabwe
