= 2016 in Namibia =

- Decades: 1990s; 2000s; 2010s; 2020s
- See also: Other events of 2016; Timeline of Namibian history

Events in the year 2016 in Namibia.

== Incumbents ==
- President: Hage Geingob
- Vice President: Nickey Iyambo
- Prime Minister: Saara Kuugongelwa
- Deputy-Prime Minister: Netumbo Nandi-Ndaitwah
- Chief Justice: Peter Shivute

== Events ==
=== Sport ===
- 28-31 January – the 2016 African Archery Championships were held in Windhoek
- 5-21 August – Namibia at the 2016 Summer Olympics: 10 competitors in 4 sports

== Deaths ==
- 6 September – Koos van Ellinckhuijzen, artist, particularly known for his works on postage stamps (b. 1942).
- 6 October – Hidipo Hamutenya, politician (b. 1939).
