= 2022 in Namibia =

- Decades: 2000s; 2010s; 2020s
- See also: Other events of 2022; Timeline of Namibian history

Events in the year 2022 in Namibia.

== Incumbents ==
- President: Hage Geingob
- Vice President: Nangolo Mbumba
- Prime Minister: Saara Kuugongelwa
- Deputy-Prime Minister: Netumbo Nandi-Ndaitwah
- Chief Justice: Peter Shivute

== Events ==
Ongoing – COVID-19 pandemic in Namibia

- 15 March – Namibia drops its requirement of face mask and mandatory PCR COVID-19 test for vaccinated visitors as the number of cases falls.
- June – The Omburu Solar Power Station becomes operational.
- July – Bethanie Desalination Plant becomes operational.
- The Ministry of Public Enterprises is disbanded

== Sports ==
- September 2021 – June 2022: 2021–22 Namibia Football Premier League
- 28 July – 8 August: Namibia at the 2022 Commonwealth Games

== Deaths ==
- 22 January – Katuutire Kaura, 80, politician, MP (1990–2015)
- 16 February – Alpheus Muheua, 65, politician
- 5 March – Immanuel Ngatjizeko, 69, politician, MP (since 2000)
- 4 May – Gerhard Mans, 60, rugby union player (Free State Cheetahs, South West Africa, national team)
