= 2024 in Namibia =

- Decades: 2000s; 2010s; 2020s
- See also: Other events of 2024; Timeline of Namibian history

Events in the year 2024 in Namibia.

== Incumbents ==
- President: Hage Geingob (until his death on 4 February); Nangolo Mbumba (since 4 February)
- Vice President: Nangolo Mbumba (until 4 February); Netumbo Nandi-Ndaitwah (since 4 February)
- Prime Minister: Saara Kuugongelwa
- Deputy-Prime Minister: Netumbo Nandi-Ndaitwah (until 4 February); John Mutorwa (since 4 February)
- Chief Justice: Peter Shivute

== Events ==
- 4 February:
  - President of Namibia Hage Geingob dies at the age of 82.
  - Vice-president Nangolo Mbumba is sworn in as the fourth President of Namibia.
- 16 April: Eleven inmates escape from a prison in Katima Mulilo, Zambezi Region.
- 21 June: The High Court of Namibia rules that two colonial-era laws criminalizing gay sex are unconstitutional.
- 27 August: The Ministry of Environment and Tourism announces a plan to cull 723 wild animals, including 83 elephants, and to distribute the meat to people struggling to feed themselves because of a severe drought across the country.
- 16 September: Four children are found dead inside a disused freezer in Katima Murillo.
- 27 November: 2024 Namibian general election: Vice President Netumbo Nandi-Ndaitwah becomes the first woman to be elected president of Namibia, while her SWAPO party retains a narrow majority in the National Assembly amid criticism over logistical problems that saw delays in voting.

== Deaths ==
- 31 January – Gerhard Tötemeyer, academic and politician (born 1935)
- 4 February – Hage Geingob, 82, politician, president (since 2015) and prime minister (1990–2002, 2012–2015).
- 14 July – Katrina Hanse-Himarwa, 57, politician, Education minister, (born 1967)

== Holidays ==
- 1 January - New Year's Day
- 21 March - Independence Day
- 29 March – Good Friday
- 1 April - Easter Monday
- 1 May - International Workers' Day
- 4 May - Cassinga Day
- 9 May - Ascension Day
- 25 May - Africa Day
- 9 August - Heroes' Day
- 10 December – Human Rights Day
- 25 December – Christmas Day
- 26 December – Family Day
