= 2018 in Namibia =

- Decades: 1990s; 2000s; 2010s; 2020s
- See also: Other events of 2018; Timeline of Namibian history

Events in the year 2018 in Namibia.

== Incumbents ==
- President: Hage Geingob
- Vice President: Nickey Iyambo (until 12 February); Nangolo Mbumba (from 12 February)
- Prime Minister: Saara Kuugongelwa
- Deputy-Prime Minister: Netumbo Nandi-Ndaitwah
- Chief Justice: Peter Shivute

== Events ==
- 12 February – Nangolo Mbumba takes over as Vice President, succeeding Nickey Iyambo

== Deaths ==
- 15 January – Rosalia Nghidinwa, politician (b. 1952).
- 13 March – Nora Schimming-Chase, politician and diplomat (b. 1940)
- 14 July – Theo-Ben Gurirab, politician (b. 1938).
- 11 December – Petrus Iilonga, politician and political prisoner, Deputy Minister of Defence (born 1947).
