= 2015 in Namibia =

- Decades: 1990s; 2000s; 2010s; 2020s
- See also: Other events of 2015; Timeline of Namibian history

Events in the year 2015 in Namibia.

== Incumbents ==
- President: Hifikepunye Pohamba (until 21 March), Hage Geingob (from 21 March)
- Vice President: Nickey Iyambo (from 21 March)
- Prime Minister: Hage Geingob (until 21 March), Saara Kuugongelwa (from 21 March)
- Deputy-Prime Minister: Netumbo Nandi-Ndaitwah
- Chief Justice of Namibia: Peter Shivute

== Events ==
- 27 November – Local and regional elections were held in the country using electronic voting.
