= 2019 in Namibia =

- Decades: 1990s; 2000s; 2010s; 2020s
- See also: Other events of 2019; Timeline of Namibian history

Events in the year 2019 in Namibia.

== Incumbents ==
- President: Hage Geingob
- Vice President: Nangolo Mbumba
- Prime Minister: Saara Kuugongelwa
- Deputy-Prime Minister: Netumbo Nandi-Ndaitwah
- Chief Justice: Peter Shivute

== Deaths ==
- 14 January – Peter Nambundunga, military officer (b. 1947).
- 8 February – Hanno Rumpf, politician and diplomat (b. 1958).
- 26 March - Immanuel Kauluma Elifas
