= 2021 in Namibia =

- Decades: 2000s; 2010s; 2020s
- See also: Other events of 2021; Timeline of Namibian history

Events in the year 2021 in Namibia.

== Incumbents ==
- President: Hage Geingob
- Vice President: Nangolo Mbumba
- Prime Minister: Saara Kuugongelwa
- Deputy-Prime Minister: Netumbo Nandi-Ndaitwah
- Chief Justice: Peter Shivute

== Events ==
Ongoing – COVID-19 pandemic in Namibia

- 11 January – Test drilling for oil by Vancouver-Canada-based ReconAfrica (formerly Reconnaissance Energy Africa Ltd.) begins in the Kavango Region, Kavango West. The license area is within the Kavango–Zambezi Transfrontier Conservation Area, home to 200,000 people and a number of endangered species, but excludes the protected areas, notably the parks. ReconAfrica has stated that "There will be no damage to the ecosystem from the planned activities."
- 8 March – Speaking on International Women's Day, First Lady Monica Geingos slams Internet trolls who ″slut shame″ her on social media.

== Sports ==
- March – The Namibia Football Premier League is scheduled to begin its first season.
