= 2017 in Namibia =

- Decades: 1990s; 2000s; 2010s; 2020s
- See also: Other events of 2017; Timeline of Namibian history

Events in the year 2017 in Namibia.

== Incumbents ==
- President: Hage Geingob
- Vice President: Nickey Iyambo
- Prime Minister: Saara Kuugongelwa
- Deputy-Prime Minister: Netumbo Nandi-Ndaitwah
- Chief Justice: Peter Shivute

== Events ==
- 23 to 25 June – Namibia hosted the 2017 Men's African Hockey Indoor Cup of Nations

== Deaths ==
- 16 January – Kerry McNamara, architect and anti-Apartheid activist (b. 1940).
- 9 June – Andimba Toivo ya Toivo, anti-Apartheid activist, politician and political prisoner (b. 1924)
