= 2023 in Namibia =

- Decades: 2000s; 2010s; 2020s
- See also: Other events of 2023; Timeline of Namibian history

Events in the year 2023 in Namibia.

== Incumbents ==
- President: Hage Geingob
- Vice President: Nangolo Mbumba
- Prime Minister: Saara Kuugongelwa
- Deputy-Prime Minister: Netumbo Nandi-Ndaitwah
- Chief Justice: Peter Shivute

== Events ==
Ongoing – COVID-19 pandemic in Namibia

- 31 January – The Namibian environment ministry announces that 61 black rhinoceros and 26 white rhinoceros were killed in the country in 2022 as a result of poaching, forty-six of whom were in Etosha National Park.
