= 2026 in Namibia =

- Decades: 2000s; 2010s; 2020s
- See also: Other events of 2026; Timeline of Namibian history

Events in the year 2026 in Namibia.

== Incumbents ==
- President: Netumbo Nandi-Ndaitwah
- Vice President: Lucia Witbooi
- Prime Minister: Elijah Ngurare
- Chief Justice: Peter Shivute

== Events ==
- 15 January – 6 February – 2026 Under-19 Men's Cricket World Cup
- 23 March – Starlink applies for a telecommunications service licence and access to radio spectrum, but is denied both by the government.
- 1 May – A minibus and a truck crash and catch fire on the B1 Highway south of Otjiwarongo, killing 11 people.
- 23 July – 2 August – Namibia at the 2026 Commonwealth Games

== Holidays ==
- 1 January – New Year's Day
- 21 March – Independence Day
- 3 April – Good Friday
- 5 April – Easter Sunday
- 6 April – Easter Monday
- 1 May – International Workers' Day
- 4 May – Cassinga Day
- 14 May – Ascension Day
- 25 May – Africa Day
- 28 May – Genocide Remembrance Day
- 26 August – Heroes' Day
- 10 December – Human Rights Day
- 25 December – Christmas Day
- 26 December – Family Day

== Deaths ==
- 8 February – Erkki Nghimtina, 78, MP (1995–2020), minister of defence (1997–2005) and labour (2015–2020).
- 3 April – James Uerikua, 43, MP (since 2025).
- 29 August – Helao Shityuwete, 92, writer and military commander (PLAN).
- 17 October – Penehupifo Pohamba, 78, first lady (2005–2015).
