= 2025 in Namibia =

- Decades: 2000s; 2010s; 2020s
- See also: Other events of 2025; Timeline of Namibian history

Events in the year 2025 in Namibia.

== Incumbents ==
- President:
  - Nangolo Mbumba (until 21 March)
  - Netumbo Nandi-Ndaitwah (since 21 March)
- Vice President:
  - Netumbo Nandi-Ndaitwah (until 21 March)
  - Lucia Witbooi (since 21 March)
- Prime Minister:
  - Saara Kuugongelwa (until 20 March)
  - Elijah Ngurare (since 21 March)
- Deputy-Prime Minister:
  - John Mutorwa (until 20 March)
  - Natangwe Ithete (21 March 2025 – 26 October 2025)
- Chief Justice: Peter Shivute

== Events ==
=== March ===
- 20 March – Saara Kuugongelwa is elected as the first female speaker of the National Assembly.
- 21 March – Netumbo Nandi-Ndaitwah is sworn in as the first female President of Namibia.

=== April ===
- 27 April – President Nandi-Ndaitwah dismisses Mac-Albert Hengari as Minister of Agriculture, Fisheries, Water and Land Reform following his arrest on rape charges.

=== May ===
- 18 May – A British national is arrested on suspicion of sexually abusing 34 San children in Otjozondjupa Region.
- 28 May – Genocide Remembrance Day, commemorating the Herero and Nama genocide during German rule from 1904 to 1908, is officially held as a holiday in Namibia for the first time.

=== June ===
- 10 June – The European Union adds Namibia to its list of high risk jurisdictions for money laundering and terrorism financing.

=== July ===
- 4 July – The government issues a moratorium on state funerals until April 2026 with exception to be granted by the president, citing high costs.

=== August ===
- 30 August – A police van collides with a prison bus near Mariental, killing 14 people and injuring three others.

=== September ===
- 22-29 September – A wildfire breaks out in Etosha National Park and destroys a third of its grazing land; the Namibian Army deploys helicopters and over 500 troops to contain it.
- 23 September – At least 90 buffaloes are recorded to have died in a stampede following a lion attack along the Chobe River in the Kavango–Zambezi Transfrontier Conservation Area.

=== October ===
- 19 October – The Ministry of Health and Social Services declares an outbreak of mpox in Swakopmund.
- 26 October – President Nandi-Ndaitwah dismisses Natangwe Ithete as Deputy PM and Minister of Industry, Mines and Energy, assuming the portfolio herself.

=== December ===
- 2 December – President Nandi-Ndaitwah appoints Modestus Amutse as minister of mines, energy, and industry, replacing Natangwe Ithete.
- 9 December – TotalEnergies announces an agreement to obtain a 40% stake in the petroleum exploration licence for the Mopane oil field.

== Holidays ==
- 1 January – New Year's Day
- 21 March – Independence Day
- 18 April – Good Friday
- 20 April – Easter Sunday
- 21 April – Easter Monday
- 1 May – International Workers' Day
- 4 May – Cassinga Day
- 25 May – Africa Day
- 28 May – Genocide Remembrance Day
- 29 May – Ascension Day
- 26 August – Heroes' Day
- 10 December – Human Rights Day
- 25 December – Christmas Day
- 26 December – Family Day

== Deaths ==
- 8 February – Sam Nujoma, 95, politician, first President of Namibia (1990–2005).
- 24 June – Moses Amweelo, 73, politician, MNA (since 2000).
- 11 August – Solomon Huwala, 89, Namibian military officer, chief of defence force (2000–2006).
