= 2013 in Namibia =

- Decades: 1990s; 2000s; 2010s; 2020s
- See also: Other events of 2013; Timeline of Namibian history

Events in the year 2013 in Namibia.

== Incumbents ==
- President: Hifikepunye Pohamba
- Prime Minister: Hage Geingob
- Chief Justice of Namibia: Peter Shivute

== Events ==
- 29 November – LAM Mozambique Airlines Flight 470 crashed into the Bwabwata National Park, killing all 27 passengers and 6 crew on board.
