= 2012 in Namibia =

- Decades: 1990s; 2000s; 2010s; 2020s
- See also: Other events of 2012; Timeline of Namibian history

Events in the year 2012 in Namibia.

== Incumbents ==
- President: Hifikepunye Pohamba
- Prime Minister: Nahas Angula (until 4 December), Hage Geingob (from 4 December)
- Chief Justice of Namibia: Peter Shivute

== Events ==
- November 10 – 17 – The Namibian Tri-Nations tournament was held in the country.
