= 2005 in Namibia =

- Decades: 1990s; 2000s; 2010s; 2020s
- See also: Other events of 2005; Timeline of Namibian history

The following lists events that happened during 2005 in Namibia.

== Incumbents ==
- President: Sam Nujoma (until 21 March), Hifikepunye Pohamba (from 21 March)
- Prime Minister: Theo-Ben Gurirab (until 21 March), Nahas Angula (from 21 March)
- Chief Justice: Peter Shivute

== Events ==
- Sam Nujoma Stadium in Katutura, Windhoek is completed.

=== March ===
- 13 March - The Namibian Air Force was commissioned at Grootfontein Air Force Base.
- 21 March - Hifikepunye Pohamba is inaugurated as the 2nd President of Namibia following Sam Nujoma, who had been President since 1989. The Cabinet and 4th National Assembly were also sworn-in.

== Deaths ==
- 15 June: Blythe Loutit, conservationist
- November: Armas Johannes, well-known singer.
- 3 November: Mwetupunga Kornelius Shelungu, King (Ohamba) of the Ovakwanyama
- 19 November: Job Kozonguizi, Deputy Prosecutors General and nephew of Fanuel Kozonguizi.
- 28 November: Victor Weyulu, Chairman of the Oukwanyama Traditional Authority.
- 7 December: Otto Schimming, first Black teacher and independence activist.
- 22 December: Markus Kooper, anti-apartheid activist.
