= 2009 in Namibia =

- Decades: 1990s; 2000s; 2010s; 2020s
- See also: Other events of 2009; Timeline of Namibian history

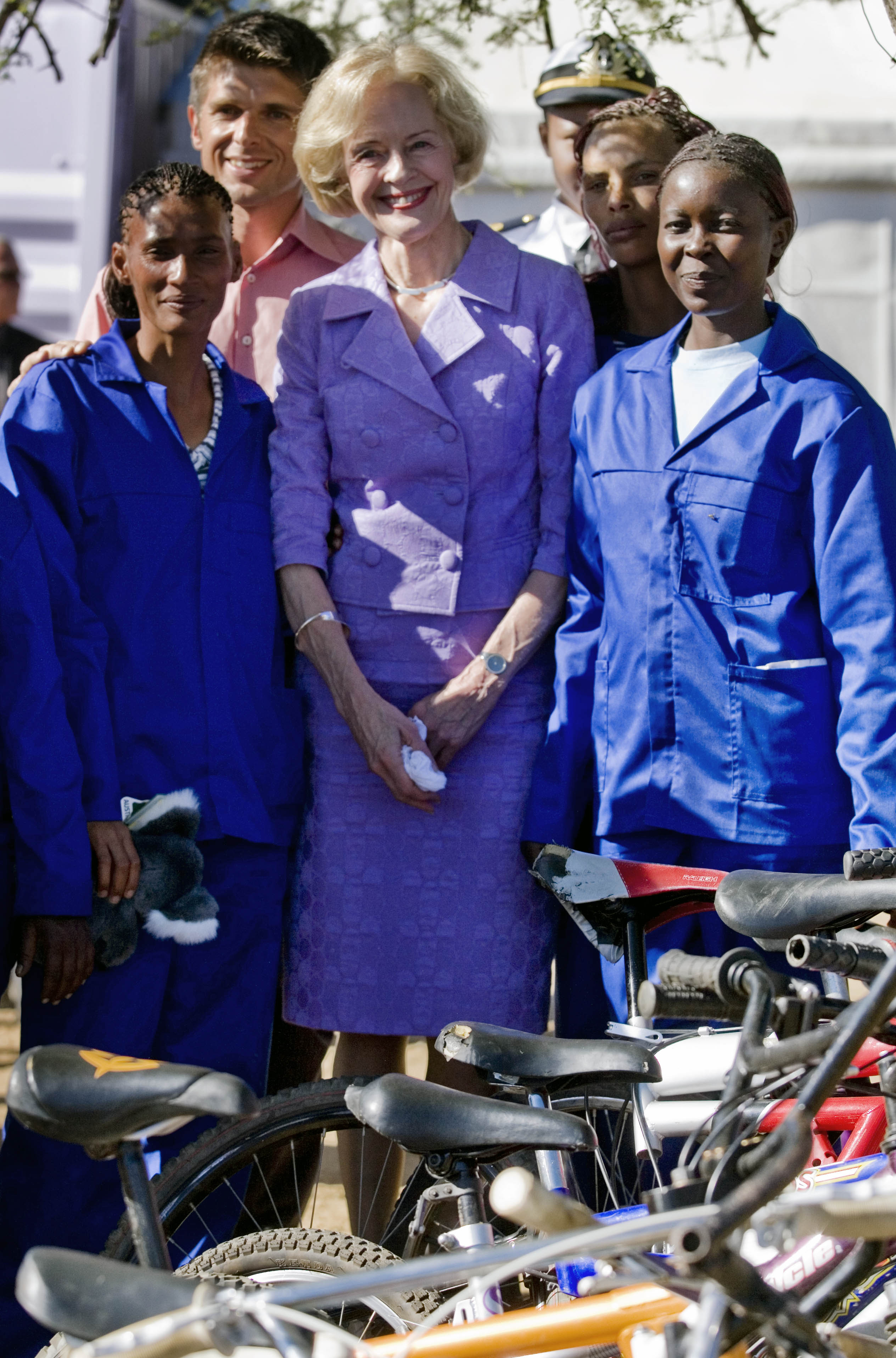
Ms Quentin Bryce AC, Governor General of Australia, poses for a photograph with members of Ben's Bikes, an NGO set up by an Australian, in Windhoek, Namibia on the 19th March, 2009.

2009 in Namibia refers to the events which occurred and will occur in the year of 2009 in the Republic of Namibia.

== Incumbents ==
- President: Hifikepunye Pohamba
- Prime Minister: Nahas Angula
- Chief Justice: Peter Shivute

== Disasters ==
President Hifikepunye Pohamba declared a state of emergency in much of Northern Namibia on 19 March following the deaths of 90 people due to flooding. The flooding was considered some of the worst in memory and food shortages were possible. Thousands were displaced.

An oil spill occurred off the coast of Lüderitz in the Atlantic Ocean in April.

== Economics ==
In January, the International Monetary Fund predicted economic growth would drop by 50% in 2009, from 4% to 2% due to the global recession. Projections were cut again in March, down to 1.2% growth, according to Minister of Finance Saara Kuugongelwa. This was credited to a decrease in mining activities across the country.

== Politics ==
=== Independence celebrations ===
President Pohamba and other members of the ruling SWAPO party led celebrations in Keetmanshoop, ǁKaras Region on 21 March 2009. 21 March marked the 19th year of independence.

=== Election ===
The 2009 general election will take place in November. Namibians outside of the country will be able to vote on 13 November, while the election dates inside of the country will 27–28 November. Two candidates, current President Hifikepunye Pohamba of the SWAPO party and former cabinet minister Hidipo Hamutenya of the Rally for Democracy and Progress were confirmed by their party's as candidates for president for the election while other parties were expected to announce their candidates later in the year.

== Sport ==
=== Boxing ===
On 2 January, boxer Paulus Moses beat Yusuke Kobori of Japan to win the World Boxing Association (WBA) lightweight title.

=== Cricket ===
In March, the Namibia national cricket team lost twice to Zimbabwe at Wanderers Stadium in South Africa.

=== Extreme sports ===
In May, 4 Deserts will host RacingThePlanet: Namibia 2009, which is a 7-day, 6 stage footrace between Keetmanshoop and Lüderitz in ǁKaras Region, southern Namibia.

=== Rugby ===
The Namibia national rugby union team qualified for the 2011 Rugby World Cup by sweeping matches against Tunisia.

=== Football ===
The Namibia national football team, also known as the Brave Warriors, played in Beirut against Lebanon on 1 April and in Luanda against Angola on 4 April in the seventh annual peace celebrations, which marked the end of the Angolan Civil War.

The Namibian Newspaper Cup was held from 10 to 13 April at Sam Nujoma Stadium in Katutura, Windhoek.

== Deaths ==
- Kruger family: March 12 Jannie and Toets Kruger, farmers outside of Omaruru, Erongo Region murdered in their home.
- Eben van Zijl, 71, former White politician in South West Africa.
- Hendrik Witbooi (politician), 75, SWAPO politician.
- Hans Erik Staby, 74, former politician in South West Africa and cricket patron.
- Victor Helu, 26, footballer.
- Theofelus Eiseb, SWAPO politician
