= 2014 in Namibia =

- Decades: 1990s; 2000s; 2010s; 2020s
- See also: Other events of 2014; Timeline of Namibian history

Events in the year 2014 in Namibia.

== Incumbents ==
- President: Hifikepunye Pohamba
- Prime Minister: Hage Geingob
- Chief Justice of Namibia: Peter Shivute

== Events ==
- 28 November – General elections were held in the country using electronic voting, the first for an African country.
