= 2002 in Namibia =

- Decades: 1990s; 2000s; 2010s; 2020s
- See also: Other events of 2002; Timeline of Namibian history

Events in the year 2002 in Namibia.

== Incumbents ==
- President: Sam Nujoma
- Prime Minister: Hage Geingob (until 28 August), Theo-Ben Gurirab (from 28 August)
- Chief Justice of Namibia: Johan Strydom

== Events ==
- 7 – 14 April – The 2002 ICC Six Nations Challenge was held in Windhoek, with the country also competing.
