= 1999 in Namibia =

- Decades: 1990s; 2000s; 2010s
- See also: Other events of 1999; Timeline of Namibian history

Events in the year 1999 in Namibia.

== Incumbents ==
- President: Sam Nujoma
- Prime Minister: Hage Geingob
- Chief Justice of Namibia: Ismael Mahomed (until March?), Johan Strydom (from March)

== Events ==
- 10 July – The Lusaka Ceasefire Agreement was signed by President Sam Nujoma and other African heads of state in Lusaka, Zambia.
