= 1998 in Namibia =

- Decades: 1990s; 2000s; 2010s
- See also: Other events of 1998; Timeline of Namibian history

The following lists events that happened during 1998 in Namibia.

== Incumbents ==
- President: Sam Nujoma
- Prime Minister: Hage Geingob
- Chief Justice: Ismael Mahomed

== Events ==
=== August ===
- August 10 - Military experts from Namibia, Zimbabwe, Zambia and Tanzania are due in Kinshasa later this week to investigate allegations of Rwandan and Ugandan troops being sent across the border.

=== September ===
- September 3 - South Africa now says it supports the intervention of the Democratic Republic of the Congo by Namibia, Zimbabwe and Angola, supporting Kabila.
