= 1996 in Namibia =

- Decades: 1990s; 2000s; 2010s
- See also: Other events of 1996; Timeline of Namibian history

Events in the year 1996 in Namibia.

== Incumbents ==
- President: Sam Nujoma
- Prime Minister: Hage Geingob
- Chief Justice of Namibia: Ismael Mahomed

== Events ==
- 19 July – 4 August – The country competed at the 1996 Summer Olympics in Atlanta, United States, with runner Frankie Fredericks winning 2 silver medals.
