= 2001 in Namibia =

- Decades: 1990s; 2000s; 2010s; 2020s
- See also: Other events of 2001; Timeline of Namibian history

Events in the year 2001 in Namibia.

== Incumbents ==
- President: Sam Nujoma
- Prime Minister: Hage Geingob
- Chief Justice of Namibia: Johan Strydom

== Events ==
- The Democratic Resettlement Community, an informal settlement in Swakopmund, Erongo Region, was founded.
