= 2004 in Namibia =

- Decades: 1990s; 2000s; 2010s; 2020s
- See also: Other events of 2004; Timeline of Namibian history

Events in the year 2004 in Namibia.

== Incumbents ==
- President: Sam Nujoma
- Prime Minister: Theo-Ben Gurirab
- Chief Justice of Namibia: Johan Strydom (until September), Simpson Mutambanengwe (from October until November), Peter Shivute (from 1 December)

== Events ==
- 15 & 16 November – General elections were held in the country to elect the President and National Assembly.
