= 2011 in Namibia =

- Decades: 1990s; 2000s; 2010s; 2020s
- See also: Other events of 2011; Timeline of Namibian history

Events in the year 2011 in Namibia.

== Incumbents ==
- President: Hifikepunye Pohamba
- Prime Minister: Nahas Angula
- Chief Justice of Namibia: Peter Shivute

== Events ==
- A series of floods occurred in the region.
