= 2000 in Namibia =

- Decades: 1990s; 2000s; 2010s; 2020s
- See also: Other events of 2000; Timeline of Namibian history

Events in the year 2000 in Namibia.

== Incumbents ==
- President: Sam Nujoma
- Prime Minister: Hage Geingob
- Chief Justice of Namibia: Johan Strydom

== Events ==
- 10 – 28 July – The J.G.A. Diergaardt (late Captain of the Rehoboth Baster Community) et al. v. Namibia case was decided by the United Nations Human Rights Committee.
