= 2007 in Namibia =

- Decades: 1990s; 2000s; 2010s; 2020s
- See also: Other events of 2007; Timeline of Namibian history

Events in the year 2007 in Namibia.

== Incumbents ==
- President: Hifikepunye Pohamba
- Prime Minister: Nahas Angula
- Chief Justice of Namibia: Peter Shivute

== Events ==
- 5 – 16 June – The country participated in the 2007 IRB Nations Cup.
