= 1997 in Namibia =

- Decades: 1990s; 2000s; 2010s
- See also: Other events of 1997; Timeline of Namibian history

Events in the year 1997 in Namibia.

== Incumbents ==
- President: Sam Nujoma
- Prime Minister: Hage Geingob
- Chief Justice of Namibia: Ismael Mahomed

== Events ==
- 13 September – A German Air Force Tupolev Tu-154M observation aircraft and a United States Air Force C-141B Starlifter transport aircraft were destroyed in a mid-air collision off the coast of the country.
