= 2008 in Namibia =

- Decades: 1990s; 2000s; 2010s; 2020s
- See also: Other events of 2008; Timeline of Namibian history

The following lists events that happened during 2008 in Namibia.

== Incumbents ==
- President: Hifikepunye Pohamba
- Prime Minister: Nahas Angula
- Chief Justice: Peter Shivute

== Environment ==
Serious flooding took place in northern Namibia in February and March 2008, with at least 42 dead and 65,000 displaced.

== Politics ==
The ruling party, SWAPO, and the new opposition party, Rally for Democracy and Progress (RDP) contested the first town council election in Omuthiya in the Oshikoto Region. On 24 April, a rally of 200 took place in Windhoek against the porting of the Chinese ship the An Yue Jiang at Walvis Bay.

In May 2008, Ignatius Shixwameni, a former SWAPO and Congress of Democrats (CoD) member, who split from CoD in December 2007, forms the All People's Party.

In June 2008, the Democratic Party of Namibia was formed in ǁKaras Region. Though the CoD's Ben Ulenga criticized the party and others as "tribal", the DPN rejected the sentiment.

== Economics ==
=== Labour ===
The 2008 Skorpion Zinc Strike was a worker's strike against the ownership of the Skorpion Zinc mine near the southern town of Rosh Pinah in ǁKaras Region. Lasting 19 days (10–29 May), the workers ended their strike when management agreed to a 12% raise in wages plus overtime and travel expenses. The workers had originally demanded a 14% raise in wages. The strike was supported by the National Union of Mineworkers, who accused Skorpion Zinc of practising racial discrimination and of negotiating in bad faith.

== Entertainment ==
Marelize Robberts (born 1987), was crowned Miss Namibia 2008.

== Sport ==
=== Football (soccer) ===
The national men's football team began 2008 in the 2008 Africa Cup of Nations. After losing 1–5 to Morocco in their opening match, Namibia lost 0–1 to host Ghana and tied 1–1 with Guinea, finishing in last place in their group. Following the Africa Cup of Nations, Namibia lost 1–3 to Malawi in Windhoek on 26 March. In July, Namibia dropped 15 spots in the FIFA rankings to 146th.

==== World Cup qualifying ====
Namibia was drawn into group 2 of the CAF first group round, alongside Kenya, Guinea and Zimbabwe. On 31 May, Namibia kicked off qualifiers at home against Kenya, defeating them on an 89th-minute goal by Costa Khaiseb. The Brave Warriors then traveled to Harare on 8 June, losing 0–2. Travelling back to Windhoek to face Guinea on 14 June, the Brave Warriors lost 1–2 on a 45th minute go-ahead goal by Pascal Feindouno. Playin in Conakry on 22 June, Namibia lost again, this time 0–4. After a two-month break, The Brave Warriors went to Nairobi on 5 September. The squad lost on a 44th-minute penalty kick by Kenyan Jamal Mohammed. The last match in the first round was back in Windhoek at Sam Nujoma Stadium against neighbor Zimbabwe on 11 October. The squad jumped to a 4–0 lead before holding onto a 4–2 win, which included two goals by Wilko Risser. However, the match was meaningless for the Brave Warriors, as they had been eliminated from World Cup competition and finished in last place in the group of 4.

== COSAFA Cup ==
The 2008 Cosafa Cup was held in South Africa. The Namibian side won their group, group B, with a record of 2–0–1. In the quarterfinals, Namibia lost 0–1 to the South Africa Development XI team.

=== Boxing ===
The University of Namibia hosted the 2nd AIBA African 2008 Olympic Qualifying Tournament from 20–30 March. At that tournament, the final round of qualifiers for boxing at the 2008 Summer Olympics for Africa were determined.

== Deaths ==
- 16 January, Munjuku Nguvauva II, 85, traditional paramount chief and leader of the Ovambanderu and Ovambanderu communities.
- 13 March, Kalla Gertze, 48, Congress of Democrats parliamentarian (13 March)
- 14 March, John Pandeni, 57, government minister
- 25 March, Nico Bessinger, former government minister
- 27 June, Chris Hatutale Hawala, 24, vice-president of the Namibian National Student Organization
- 13 July, John Mabuku, former DTA National Councillor and secession leader in the Caprivi conflict
- 14 July, Gabes Shihepo, 53, former deputy minister
- 5 August, Hannes Smith, 75, former reporter
