= 1980 in Namibia =

- Decades: 1990s; 2000s
- See also: Other events of 1980; Timeline of Namibian history

1980 in Namibia refers to events that occurred in Namibia (also known as South West Africa) during 1980.

== Military ==
Operation Sceptic is launched during the South African Border War against SWAPO.

The South West African Territorial Force, an auxiliary of the South African Defence Force (SADF), is formed on August 1. Conscription for all 18+ year old Namibians is put in place.

== Politics ==
- 1 July: Cornelius Cloete, a member of the Democratic Turnhalle Alliance (DTA), becomes the first leader of the newly founded Namaland.
- 5 December: Thimoteus Tjamuaha replaces Kuaima Riruako as the leader of Hereroland.
- October: Rev. Cornelius Ndjoba resigns as leader of the DTA.

== Births ==
- 11 March: Beata Naigambo
- 22 March: Sherwin Vries
- 13 July: Jeremiah Baisako
- 6 August: Paulus Ambunda
- 9 August: Jurie van Tonder
- 10 August: Riaan Walters
- 13 August: Hilaria Johannes
- 8 October: Günther von Hundelshausen
