= 2003 in Namibia =

- Decades: 1990s; 2000s; 2010s; 2020s
- See also: Other events of 2003; Timeline of Namibian history

Events in the year 2003 in Namibia.

== Incumbents ==
- President: Sam Nujoma
- Prime Minister: Theo-Ben Gurirab
- Chief Justice of Namibia: Johan Strydom

== Events ==
- 5 – 7 October – The country competed in the 2003 All-Africa Games held at the National Stadium in the city of Abuja, Nigeria.
