= Vice president =

Officer in government or business

A vice president or vice-president, also director in British English, is an officer in government or business who is below the president (or chief executive officer) in rank. It can also refer to executive vice presidents, signifying that the vice president is on the executive branch of the government, university or company. The name comes from the Latin term vice meaning "in place of" and typically serves as pro tempore (Latin: 'for the time being') to the president. In some countries, the vice president is called the deputy president. In everyday speech, the abbreviation VP is used.

== In government ==
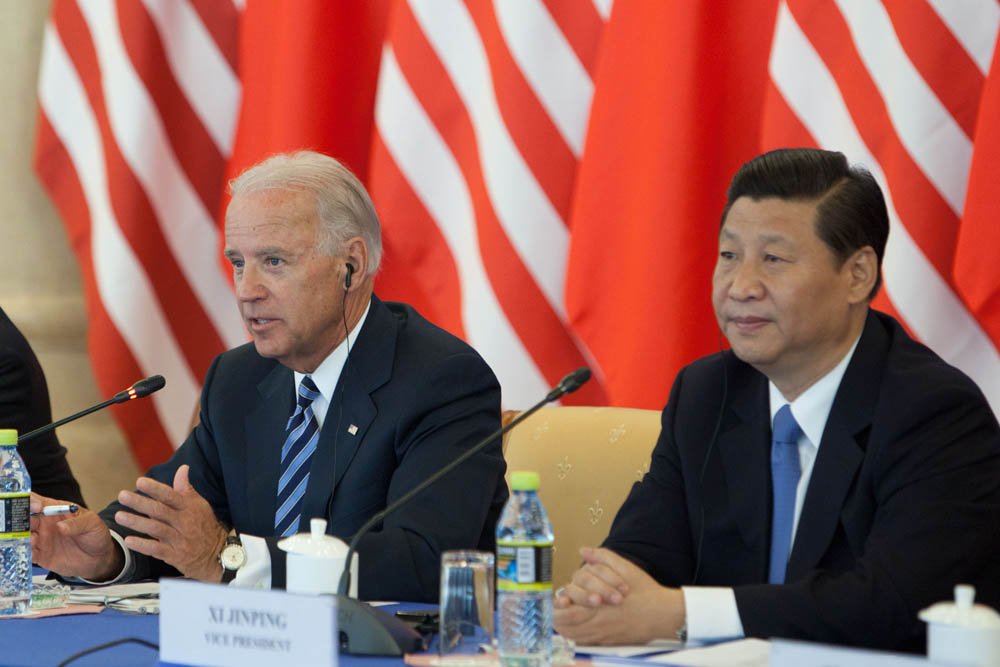
U.S. Vice President Joe Biden and his Chinese counterpart Xi Jinping in 2011

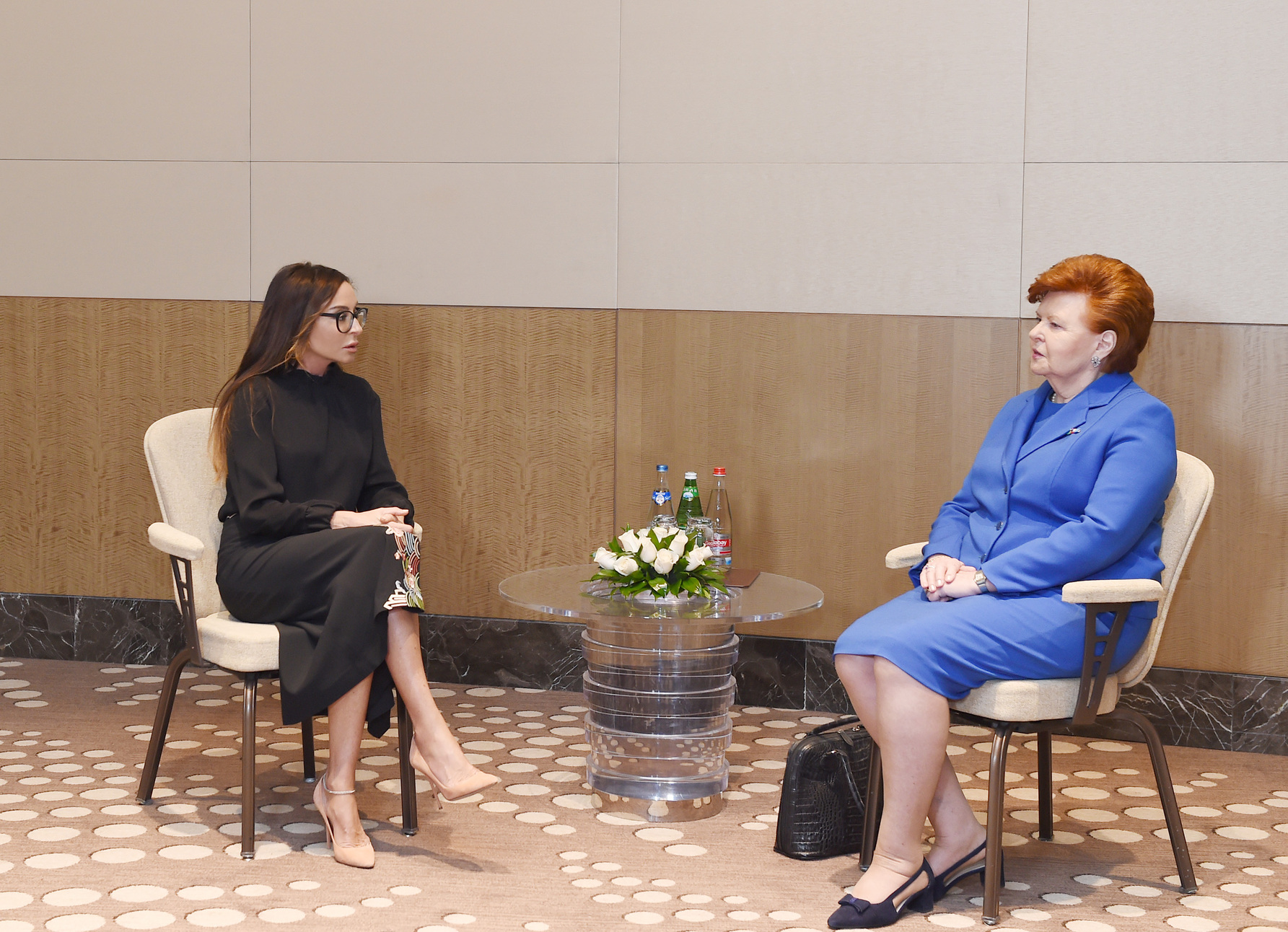
Azerbaijan's vice president Mehriban Aliyeva with former Latvian president Vaira Vīķe-Freiberga in 2017

In government, a vice president is a person whose primary responsibility is to act in place of the president on the event of the president's death, resignation or incapacity. Vice presidents are either elected jointly with the president as their running mate, or more rarely, appointed independently after the president's election.

Most governments with vice presidents have one person in this role at any time, although in some countries there are two or more vice presidents–an extreme case being Iran's 14 vice presidents. If the president is not present, dies, resigns, or is otherwise unable to fulfill their duties, the vice president will generally serve as president. In many presidential systems, vice presidents may not wield much day-to-day political power, but are still considered important members of the cabinet, while other vice presidents might not have any purpose beyond acting in place of the president on the event of the president's death, resignation or incapacity. A few vice presidents in the Americas also hold the position of president of the senate; this is the case, for example, in Argentina, the United States, and Uruguay. The vice president sometimes assumes some of the ceremonial duties of the president, such as attending diplomatic functions and events that the actual president may be too busy to attend; the Vice President of the United States, for example, often attends funerals of world leaders on behalf of the president. A vice president, in some cases, may also be appointed by the president as the head of a ministry in the cabinet or to lead certain executive initiatives designated by the president. In parliamentary or semi-presidential systems, a vice president may coexist with a prime minister, as is the case in India and Namibia, but the presence of both offices concurrently is rare.

== In business ==
In business, "vice president" refers to hierarchical position that ranges from extremely senior positions directly reporting to C-level executives (in non-financial companies), to junior non-management positions with four to 10 years of experience (in financial companies).

In non-financial businesses, vice presidents often report directly to the president or CEO of the company and are members of the executive management team. Some corporations that use this term may have individuals with the title of vice president responsible for specific business divisions (e.g., vice president for legal, vice president for sales and marketing, vice president for finance, and vice president for human resources).

When there are typically several vice presidents in a company, these individuals are sometimes differentiated with titles denoting higher positions such as executive vice president or senior vice president, with the remaining management team holding the title vice president. The title of assistant vice president or associate vice president is used in large organizations below vice president and there can be a very convoluted list of other types of VPs as seen in the next section.

As many of these VPs have minimal employees reporting to them, their necessity has been questioned, with for example Inc. magazine arguing to flatten the corporate hierarchy. Similarly, as universities have adopted a corporate structure there is concern over administrative bloat and over-paying VPs. Benjamin Ginsberg, a political scientist and professor, has claimed the proliferation of VPs and other administrators is destroying universities. "Corporate vice president" is an older term that usually denotes a vice president that is named as a corporate officer by the board of directors. Not all vice presidents in a company in the modern business environment are named as an official corporate officer.

=== Financial services ===
In the financial services industry, such as in commercial banking and investment banking, the title of vice president carries a significantly different meaning than in non-financial corporations. Rather than denoting an elite executive position directly reporting to C-level management, a vice president in finance is typically a mid-level manager rank achieved within four to ten years of professional experience. Because it functions as a standard tier on a compressed promotion ladder, global financial institutions often maintain thousands of employees holding this title concurrently.

== In other organizations ==
In other organizations (e.g., trade unions, societies, clubs) one or multiple vice presidents are elected by the members of the organization. When multiple vice presidents are elected, the positions are usually numbered to prevent confusion as to who may preside or succeed to the office of president upon vacancy of that office (for example: first vice president, second vice president, and so on). In some cases vice presidents are given titles due to their specific responsibilities, for example: vice president of operations, finance, etc. In some associations the first vice president can be interchangeable with executive vice president and the remaining vice presidents are ranked in order of their seniority. Sometimes a vice president is also called presidium member, especially when there are more than a single person holding the post.

The primary responsibility of the vice president of a club or organization is to be prepared to assume the powers and duties of the office of the president in the case of a vacancy in that office. If the office of president becomes vacant, the vice president (or in clubs with multiple vice presidents, the VP that occupies the highest-ranking office), will assume the office of president, with the lower vice presidents to fill in the remaining vice presidencies, leaving the lowest vice presidency to be filled by either election or appointment. If the bylaws of a club specifically provide of the officer title of president-elect, that officer would assume the powers and duties of the president upon vacancy of that office only if specified in the bylaws.

== See also ==
- Monarch
