= Leaders of Namaland =

Tenure	Incumbent	Affiliation
Namaland (Representative Authority of the Namas)
1 July 1980 to 31 March 1985	Cornelius Cloete, Chairman of the Executive Committee	DTA
1 June 1985 to May 1989	Daniel Luipert, Chairman of the Executive Committee	DTA

== Political Affiliation ==
DTA - Democratic Turnhalle Alliance

== See also ==
- Namibia
- Bantustans in South West Africa
- Apartheid in Namibia
- Presidents of Namibia
- Prime Ministers of Namibia
