= Namibian Newspaper Cup =

Association football tournament in Namibia

- Founded: 2001
- Region: Namibia
- Current champions: Omusati (2nd title)
- Most championships: Khomas; Omaheke (4 titles each)

The Namibian Newspaper Cup is an under-20 association football tournament for the top men's U-20 players in Namibia. It also promotes women's football in Namibia by holding a match between top Namibian women's squad prior to the final. it is sponsored by the newspaper The Namibian. The Namibia Football Association considers it preparation for the All Africa Games and Summer Olympics. The event has been held in Walvis Bay, Oshakati, Gobabis, Otjiwarongo, Mariental and Keetmanshoop. The 2009 version was held from 10 April to 13 April at Sam Nujoma Stadium in Katutura, Windhoek.
