= Jeremiah Baisako =

Namibian footballer

Personal information
- Date of birth: 13 July 1980 (age 46)
- Place of birth: Tses, South West Africa
- Position: Left-back

Senior career*
Years	Team	Apps	(Gls)
2004–2007	United Africa Tigers		
2007–2010	Ramblers		
2010–2011	SK Windhoek		

International career
2002–2008	Namibia	18	(0)
- * Club domestic league appearances and goals

Jeremiah Baisako (born 13 July 1980) is a Namibian footballer who played for the Namibia national football team. Baisako played domestically for United Africa Tigers, Ramblers F.C. and SK Windhoek.
