= Günther von Hundelshausen =

Namibian footballer

Günther von Hundelshausen (born 8 October 1980) is a Namibian footballer with SK Windhoek in the Namibia Premier League. He has also played with the Namibia national football team.
