= Koos van Ellinckhuijzen =

Namibian artist (1942–2016)

Jacobus Johannes "Koos" van Ellinckhuijzen (20 September 1942 – 6 September 2016) was a Namibian visual artist. He was most noted for his work on Namibian and South-West African postage stamps.

== Biography ==
Van Ellinckhuijzen was born to Dutch parents on 20 September 1942 in Pretoria, the then administrative capital of the Union of South Africa. He pursued a military career but, after 11 years of service, became a game warden with the Department of Nature Conservation and Tourism in South-West Africa. Without any formal instructions in the arts he completed four paintings during that time. In 1979 he became a full-time artist.

Van Ellinckhuijzen was a surrealist exhibiting in both Namibia and the United States. His personal preference were surreal and metaphysical topics as well as three-dimensional astrophysical panoramas that he called "Stereoptic" creations. Of his stamps, the Solar System, Halley's comet, and Satellites in orbit are well-known. The painting Nativity was awarded a first prize at a 3D arts exhibition in Rochester, NY in the United States. He is claimed to have been the first artist to manually produce stereo paintings. Adelheid Lilienthal, in Art in Namibia, noted the scientific accuracy of his designs, their clean lines and his use of watercolor techniques. Of his sources of inspiration, van Ellinckhuijzen wrote that "M. C. Escher, René Magritte and Albert Einstein [...] all left their legacies in Koos' soul".

Van Ellinckhuijzen died on 6 September 2016 in Swakopmund at the age of 73, a few days after suffering a stroke.
