= Hage G. Geingob High School =

High school in Windhoek, Namibia

Coordinates: 22.5094°S 17.0409°E

- Windhoek; Namibia

Information
- School type: High school
- Established: 2001; 25 years ago
- Staff: 38 (including teachers)
- Teaching staff: 32
- Grades: 8-12
- Enrollment: 912
- Last updated: 9 April 2025

Hage G. Geingob High School is a high school situated between Freedomland and Hakahana Township, in Windhoek, the capital of Namibia. Named after the first Namibian prime minister and third president of the republic of Namibia, the late Hage Geingob, this public school was established in 2001 and has grades from 8–12.

The school has 32 teachers, three institutional workers, one bus driver, two administrators and 912 students. Situated in the heart of the Katutura township, the school caters mostly for learners from an economically disadvantaged background. These are children from the informal settlements in the outskirts of the capital. Most of the learners walk long distances, up to 5 km (3.1 mi) to reach this school. Hage Geingob High School was among the best performing schools in Khomas Region in 2017.
