= ShutItAllDown =

Protest in Namibia

- Date: 8 October 2020 - 12 October 2020
- Location: Windhoek, Swakopmund, and other parts of Namibia
- Caused by: The killing of Shannon Wasserfall; sexual and gender based violence; and femicide in Namibia
- Goals: To end sexual and gender based violence; to end femicide and to ensure gender equality
- Methods: Protests, Demonstrations
- Status: Ended

Casualties
- Arrested: 25
- Charged: 24

ShutItAllDown was a wave of anti-Sexual and Gender Based Violence protests across Namibia aimed at stopping the spread and continuation of physical and sexual violence against women. The protests, which began on 8 October 2020, followed the killing of 22-year-old Shannon Wasserfall whose remains were reportedly found buried in a shallow grave near Walvis Bay, 6 months after she went missing.

== Background ==
On 10 April 2020, 22-year-old Shannon Wasserfall went missing in the coastal town of Walvis Bay. Following her disappearance, communities rallied together using social media in search of her. After six months of her disappearance, her father received an anonymous text message informing him that his daughter was buried in a grave kilometres away from the town. He later informed the Namibia Police who went to dig out the remains. Two days later, one woman and her brother were arrested in connection to Wasserfall's murder.

== Public reactions ==
Following the revelations of the discovery of a grave, massive protests from young Namibians rang out demanding an end to rape and the killing of women in the country. Young people used the hashtag #ShutItAllDown to mobilise themselves on social media platform Twitter and took to the streets to denounce sexual and gender based violence.

== Protests and police brutality ==
The events of Wasserfall's killing lead to nationwide protests. During the protests, the Namibian police began to counter the protesters arresting 25 youths including three journalists who were covering the events.

This followed an almost violent confrontation between protesters and the police alongside Sam Nujoma Drive in the Windhoek city centre. The arrested protesters took to social media to decry police treatment. They were later charged and released. On Monday 12 October, they appeared before the Windhoek Margistrate's Court where several protesters joined them to continue the protests.
