= Blythe Loutit =

- Born: Blythe Pascoe; 14 November 1940; Natal, South Africa
- Died: 15 June 2005 (aged 64); Namibia
- Education: South African National Botanical Institute
- Occupation: conservationist
- Organization(s): Namibia Wildlife Trust, Wildlife Society of Namibia
- Notable work: A founder member of the Save the Rhino, The Magic Elephant of the Namib
- Spouse(s): Rudi Loutit, married 1973
- Awards: 1988 Peter Scott Merit Award, 1991 Operation Survival Award, 2001 BBC's Animal Award

Blythe Loutit née Pascoe (14 November 1940, in Natal, South Africa – 15 June 2005, in Namibia) was a founder member of the Save the Rhino Trust (SRT), an artist and a respected conservationist.

== Biography ==

The youngest of four children, she grew up on her parents' farm in Natal and received her schooling in Pietermaritzburg. Inspired by her mother, who was a landscape gardener, Blythe worked for some time as a botanical illustrator at the Botanic Research Institute of South Africa and met Rudi Loutit, her future husband, at the Wilderness Leadership School in Natal. They were married in 1973 and because the war in Angola ruled out settling there, they opted for the relative safety of Namibia. Rudi took up a position at the Skeleton Coast National Park while Blythe spent her time drawing and painting. Outraged by the slaughter of rhinoceros and elephants in the area at the hands of the South African Defence Force soldiers and poachers in the 1980s, Blythe Loutit and Ina Britz formed the Namibia Wildlife Trust, followed a few years later by the Save the Rhino Trust, aimed at conserving the rhinos and elephants in the savanna.

Blythe enlisted the help of tribal chiefs, news media, miners, geologists and even soldiers, and appointed rehabilitated poachers as game guards. She involved village communities, badgered government officials and set up community tourism programmes. Politicians and affluent businessmen who entered Namibia to hunt for trophies, were identified by name in the media. Her personal initiative averted probable extinction for the black rhino in Namibia as rhino numbers slowly grew and the information compiled by SRT became widely regarded as comprehensive and reliable. The problems Blythe Loutit faced were similar to those experienced in the 1950s by Ian Player in trying to save the white rhino.

Blythe illustrated a number of books on Namibian flora, landscapes and wildlife, most of the proceeds going to rhino conservation. Save the Rhino Trust was founded to try to halt the destruction of the desert-dwelling black rhinoceros in the Kunene Region (Damaraland and Kaokoland). Since 1982 she devoted all her time to rhino projects in Namibia.

In 1986 Blythe received the IUCN Species Survival Commission's Peter Scott Merit Award together with husband Rudi Loutit, the Survival Award for the Conservation of an Endangered Species in 1992, and in 2001 the BBC's Animal Award for the Conservation of a Species.

Blythe Loutit died of cancer in 2005.

== Bibliography ==
- Loutit, Blythe - Checklist: Etosha National Park, Struik Publishers, ISBN 1-86825-629-4 (1-86825-629-4)
- Loutit, Blythe - The Magic Elephant of the Namib, Out of Africa Publishers, ISBN 99916-2-178-4 (99916-2-178-4)
- Loutit, Blythe, Berry and Muller - Trees and Shrubs of the Etosha National Park and in Northern and Central Namibia, Namibia Scientific Society, ISBN 99916-40-17-7 (99916-40-17-7)
- Loutit, Blythe, Muller and Giess - Grasse Van Suidwes Afrika, Namibie Direktoraat Landbou en Bosbou, Département Landbou en Natuurbewaring, ISBN 0-620-06582-6 (0-620-06582-6)
