= Theofelus Eiseb =

Namibian politician (1956–2009)

Theofelus Eiseb (12 March 1956 – 27 November 2009) was a Namibian politician and school teacher. Eiseb was an inaugural member of the National Council of Namibia until his appointment as governor of his native Otjozondjupa Region in 2003. He was removed as regional governor in 2009 as a result of poor health. In 2007, he was arrested by the Anti-Corruption Commission for allegedly enriching himself with state funds. He stayed on as governor despite the allegations and was removed shortly before his death due to ill-health. The corruption charges were cited as factors in his death.

== Career and early life ==
Eiseb was born in 1956 in Okahandja in the central Otjozondjupa Region of South West Africa. He studied at Cornelius Goreseb High School in Khorixas and Martin Luther High School in Okambahe from 1973 to 1977.

In February 2010, it was discovered that Eiseb was still on the voters' roll in Okahandhja, despite having died four months previous.
