= Twaloloka fire =

2020 fire at Twaloloka informal settlement in Walvis Bay, Namibia

Twaloloka Fire
- Date: 26 July 2020; 19h00 CAT
- Location: Walvis Bay

Impacts
- Deaths: 1

Ignition
- Cause: Unknown

The Twaloloka fire was a massive fire that swept through the Twaloloka informal settlement in the Namibian coastal town of Walvis Bay, on Sunday 26 July 2020. It destroyed houses and left hundreds homeless. One baby died. The disaster sparked political debate with many accusing the ruling SWAPO party of having "neglected the plights of the poor".

== Public reactions ==
Following reports of the fires, Namibians began to use social media to mobilize resources and request for help for the residents of the informal settlement while the government appealed for calm from the citizens.

Opposition political parties of such as Popular Democratic Movement and the Landless People's Movement blamed the SWAPO led government of having given 'lip service' to the housing crisis in the country. Affirmative Repositioning movement leader Job Amupanda took to twitter to call upon the local residents to occupy vacant the mass housing project houses.

== Aftermath and rebuilding ==
Following the fire, members of the community began to donate materials and funds towards the rebuilding of the settlement stating that the people needed not to wait for SWAPO anymore. A GoFundMe account was set up while PDM leader while the Affirmative Repositioning movement stationed its activists to collect donations across the country while Landless People's Movement stationed financial help. Opposition leader, McHenry Venaani donated 200 blankets and 100 mattresses while the SWAPO party which had been criticized for its handling of the housing crisis made donations through prime minister Saara Kuugongelwa-Amadhila donated pallets of food, mattresses and tents.

Following the fire, the informal settlement was renamed from Twaloloka (Ndonga: We are tired) to Otweya (Ndonga: We are coming).

== See also ==
- Squatting in Namibia
