= SK Windhoek =

Namibian sports club

- Full name: Sport Klub Windhoek
- Nickname: Cymot Boys
- Short name: SKW
- Founded: 1951; 75 years ago
- Ground: SKW Stadium, Windhoek
- Capacity: N/A
- Chairman: Jochen Traut
- Manager: Lesley Kakuva
- League: Namibia Second Division
Home colours	Away colours

The Sport Klub Windhoek, also known as SK Windhoek, SKW, and Cymot SKW due to sponsorship reasons, is a Namibian sports club based in Windhoek. They played in the highest division of Namibian football (soccer), the Namibia Premier League until 2013.

It is known to be the sports club of German Namibians (thus the German spelling variant Sport Klub, although the correct spelling would be Sportklub without a space) but nonetheless open to all Namibians.
