= Postage stamps and postal history of Namibia =

A stamp issued in 1990 to mark Namibian independence

Namibia, formerly known as South West Africa and German South West Africa, has a long history of postal services, starting in 1814 with postal runners delivering messages among mission stations. The first stamps were printed during the German colonial period. Currently NamPost is responsible for running postal services, managing 135 postal offices in the country.

== Pre-colonial period ==
The first postal services in Namibia (then known as South West Africa) started in 1814 with the deployment of messengers facilitating communication between the early mission stations at Warmbad and Bethanie and later to Keetmanshoop and Gross Barmen. This service was expanded in 1846, connecting the South West African mission stations to those in South Africa.

== German colonial period ==
The first post office of South West Africa was founded in Otjimbingwe in 1888, further offices were established in Windhoek (1891) and Swakopmund (1895).

== South African period ==
The South African Army overran the colony in 1914–15 and the territory was controlled by South Africa until Namibian independence in 1990.

== Independent Namibia ==
Namibia has issued regular definitive and commemorative stamps since independence in 1989. NamPost is the company responsible for postal service in Namibia. It currently has 743 employees in 135 post offices, and reserves of N$2.51 million. CEO of NamPost is Festus Hangula.

In 1989, the last stamps of South West Africa were a set of 15 depicting minerals and mining. Shortly before their issue in 1990, the territory gained independence as Namibia. As the stamps were new, most of the designs were kept with only the name changed (cuprite was dropped and willemite added for the Namibian issue).

Another problem was that one of the stamps, for boltwoodite, had an error in its chemical equation. This was corrected in the Namibian issue.

== Bibliography ==
- Gondwana Collection Namibia & NamPost. Stamps & Stories: 50 Stories on Namibia's Postage Stamps. Windhoek: Gondwana Travel Centre, 2012 2 vols.
- Putzel, Ralph F. The Comprehensive Handbook of the Postmarks of German South West Africa/South West Africa/Namibia. Tokai, South Africa: R.F. Putzel, 1991 600p.
- Reinert, Peter. UNTAG: A Postal History. Windhoek: SWA Scientific Society, 1990 ISBN 0949995479 137p.
- The South African Stamp Colour Catalogue 2019–20. 36th ed. Johannesburg: International Philatelic Service, 2019 406p.
- van den Hurk, George. Border Mail: Postal History and Markings of the War in Angola and Along the Namibian Border, 1975–1976. Zug, Switzerland: G.J. van den Hurk, 1990 76p. Two further volumes appeared in 1990 (for 1977-80) and 1991 (for 1981-88).
- Van der Merwe, Barend Frederik. 'n Bedryfsekonomiese analise van die ontwikkeling van die poswese in Namibia. Pretoria: Vista Universiteit, 1992 295p.
