= Deputy-Prime Minister of Namibia =

Senior cabinet-level position in Namibia

- Coat of arms of Namibia

- Flag of Namibia
- Incumbent; Vacant since 26 October 2025
- Appointer: President of Namibia
- Inaugural holder: Hendrik Witbooi
- Formation: 21 March 1990; 36 years ago

The deputy-prime minister of Namibia is a senior cabinet-level position in Namibia.

The deputy-prime minister is appointed by the president of Namibia to perform any needed functions assigned to him or her by the president, the vice president or the prime minister.

The title deputy-prime minister is written with a hyphen in the Constitution of Namibia.

== List of officeholders ==
Political parties

South West Africa People's Organization (SWAPO)

No.	Portrait	Name (Birth–Death)	Term of office			Political party	Prime Minister	Notes
No.	Portrait	Name (Birth–Death)	Took office	Left office	Time in office	Political party	Prime Minister	Notes
1		Hendrik Witbooi (1934–2009)	21 March 1990	21 March 2005	15 years	SWAPO	Hage Geingob	
1		Hendrik Witbooi (1934–2009)	21 March 1990	21 March 2005	15 years	SWAPO	Theo-Ben Gurirab	
2		Libertina Amathila (born 1940)	21 March 2005	21 March 2010	5 years	SWAPO	Nahas Angula	
3		Marco Hausiku (1953–2021)	21 March 2010	21 March 2015	5 years	SWAPO	Nahas Angula	
3		Marco Hausiku (1953–2021)	21 March 2010	21 March 2015	5 years	SWAPO	Hage Geingob	
4		Netumbo Nandi-Ndaitwah (born 1952)	21 March 2015	4 February 2024	8 years, 320 days	SWAPO	Saara Kuugongelwa-Amadhila	
5		John Mutorwa (born 1957)	9 February 2024	21 March 2025	1 year, 40 days	SWAPO	Saara Kuugongelwa-Amadhila	
6		Natangwe Ithete (born 1976)	21 March 2025	26 October 2025	1 year, 170 days	SWAPO	Elijah Ngurare	

== See also ==
- Politics of Namibia
- List of colonial governors of South West Africa
- President of Namibia
- Vice President of Namibia
- Prime Minister of Namibia
- Cabinet of Namibia
