= Vice President of Namibia =

Deputy head of state and government of Namibia

Vice-president of the Republic of Namibia
- Coat of arms of Namibia
- Incumbent; Lucia Witbooi since 22 March 2025
- Appointer: President
- Term length: 5 years
- Inaugural holder: Nickey Iyambo
- Formation: 21 March 2015; 11 years ago
- Salary: US$87,789 annually

The vice-president of Namibia is the deputy head of state and head of government of Namibia. He or she is first in the line of presidential succession, and serves as acting president when the president is outside the country's borders or otherwise unable to fulfil the duties of the office. The vice-president is also a member of the National Assembly and the cabinet. The vice-president is constitutionally required to 'assist the president in the execution of the functions of government,' and may be assigned any government portfolio by presidential proclamation.

The position of the vice-president was established in 2014 along with several other constitutional amendments. The position is controversial due to its unclear portfolio. Nickey Iyambo served as the first vice-president of Namibia from 2015 to 2018. Lucia Witbooi is the incumbernt vice-president since 22 March 2025. Her deputy since 2 April 2026 is Moses ǁKhumub, deputy Minister in the Office of the Vice President.

== List of officeholders ==
Political parties

South West Africa People's Organization (SWAPO)

No.	Portrait	Name (Birth–Death)	Term of office			Political party
No.	Portrait	Name (Birth–Death)	Took office	Left office	Time in office	Political party
1		Nickey Iyambo (1936–2019)	21 March 2015	8 February 2018	2 years, 324 days	SWAPO
2		Nangolo Mbumba (born 1941)	8 February 2018	4 February 2024	5 years, 361 days	SWAPO
3		Netumbo Nandi-Ndaitwah (born 1952)	4 February 2024	21 March 2025	1 year, 45 days	SWAPO
4		Lucia Witbooi (born 1961)	22 March 2025	Incumbent	1 year, 170 days	SWAPO

== See also ==
- Politics of Namibia
- List of colonial governors of South West Africa
- President of Namibia
- Prime Minister of Namibia
- Deputy Prime Minister of Namibia
- Cabinet of Namibia
