= Hage Geingob =

President of Namibia from 2015 to 2024

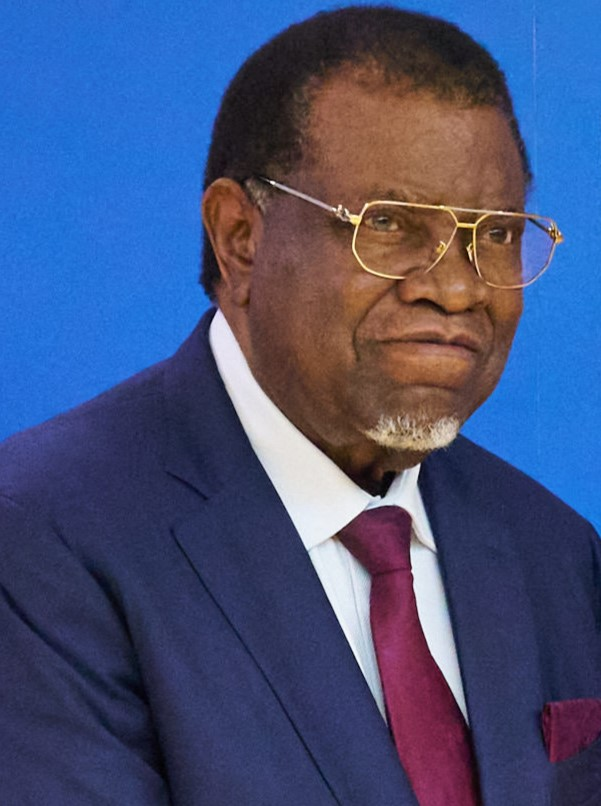
- Geingob in 2023

3rd President of Namibia
- In office 21 March 2015 – 4 February 2024
- Prime Minister: Saara Kuugongelwa
- Vice President: Nickey Iyambo (2015–2018); Nangolo Mbumba (2018–2024)
- Preceded by: Hifikepunye Pohamba
- Succeeded by: Nangolo Mbumba

President of SWAPO
- In office 26 November 2017 – 4 February 2024
- Preceded by: Hifikepunye Pohamba
- Succeeded by: Nangolo Mbumba

1st Prime Minister of Namibia
- In office 4 December 2012 – 21 March 2015
- President: Hifikepunye Pohamba
- Deputy: Marco Hausiku
- Preceded by: Nahas Angula
- Succeeded by: Saara Kuugongelwa
- In office 21 March 1990 – 28 August 2002
- President: Sam Nujoma
- Deputy: Hendrik Witbooi
- Preceded by: Office established
- Succeeded by: Theo-Ben Gurirab

Minister of Trade and Industry
- In office 8 April 2008 – 4 December 2012
- Prime Minister: Nahas Angula
- Preceded by: Immanuel Ngatjizeko
- Succeeded by: Calle Schlettwein

Member of the National Assembly of Namibia
- In office 21 March 1990 – 21 March 2015
- Preceded by: Office established

Member of the Constituent Assembly of Namibia
- In office 1989 – 21 March 1990
- Preceded by: Office established
- Succeeded by: Constituent Assembly replaced with National Assembly

Personal details
- Born: Hage Gottfried Geingob; 3 August 1941 Otjiwarongo, South West Africa (present-day Namibia)
- Died: 4 February 2024 (aged 82) Windhoek, Namibia
- Resting place: Heroes' Acre
- Party: SWAPO
- Spouses: Priscilla "Patty" Geingos (m. 1967; div. 1992) Loini Kandume (m. 1992; div. 2008) Monica Kalondo (m. 2015)
- Children: 5
- Education: Temple University; Fordham University (BA); The New School (MA); University of Leeds (PhD)
- Occupation: Politician
- Awards: Hon

Hage Gottfried Geingob (3 August 1941 – 4 February 2024) was a Namibian politician who served as the third president of Namibia from 2015 until his death in February 2024. Geingob was the country's first prime minister from 1990 to 2002, and served again from 2012 to 2015.

Between 2008 and 2012 Geingob served as Minister of Trade and Industry. In November 2014, Geingob was elected president of Namibia by an overwhelming margin. In November 2017, Geingob became the third president of the ruling SWAPO Party after winning by a large margin at the party's sixth Congress. He served as the party's president until his death. In August 2018, Geingob began a one-year term as chairperson of the Southern African Development Community.

== Early life ==
Hage Geingob was born on 3 August 1941 in the Grootfontein district of the Otjozondjupa region in central Namibia.

He received his early education at Otavi. He joined the Augustineum in 1958. In 1960, he was expelled from the Augustineum for participating in a march to protest against the poor quality of education and food. However, he was readmitted and finished the teacher training course in 1961. Subsequently, he took up a teaching position at the Tsumeb Primary School in Central Namibia but decided that he could not further his education in Namibia. As a teacher, he also resented being forced to participate in the Bantu Education System.

Therefore, at the end of the school year, he left his job to seek knowledge and instruction that could help him change the system. He and three of his colleagues walked and hitchhiked to Botswana to escape the system. Geingob lived in exile in Botswana, the United States, and the United Kingdom for 27 years. In Botswana, he served as Assistant South West Africa People's Organization (SWAPO) Representative from 1963 to 1964. From Francistown, Botswana, he was scheduled to travel on a plane chartered by the African National Congress (ANC), but the plane was blown up by South African agents the evening before the plane was supposed to take off. Subsequently, the apartheid regime also tightened up the "underground railway".

=== University years ===
In 1964, Geingob left for the United States to study at Temple University in Philadelphia, Pennsylvania. Subsequently, he obtained a BA degree from Fordham University in New York City and an MA degree from The New School in New York City.

In 1964, he was appointed SWAPO Representative at the United Nations and to the Americas. He served in this position until 1971. He traveled extensively across the United States. Eventually, the United Nations General Assembly recognized SWAPO as the sole and authentic representative of the people of Namibia.

== Career as a politician and educationist ==
In 1971, Geingob was appointed to the United Nations Secretariat as a political affairs officer. In 1975, he was appointed director of the United Nations Institute for Namibia. He and his team were responsible for starting the institute, whose primary function was to train cadres who could take over the civil service of Namibia upon independence. Another important component of the institute was to carry out sectoral research to develop a policy framework for the government of independent Namibia. Over the years, it grew in stature and institutional relations were established with various institutions of higher learning in Europe, including the University of Warwick, University of East Anglia, and University of Sussex. These and other institutions recognized the institute's diploma and admitted its graduates for further studies.

Geingob was director of the United Nations Institute for Namibia until 1989. At the same time, he continued to be a member of both the Central Committee and the Politburo of SWAPO.

=== Constituent Assembly ===
In 1989, he spearheaded SWAPO's election campaign in Namibia. To carry out this assignment, he returned to Namibia with many of his colleagues on 18 June 1989, after 27 years' absence from the country. As SWAPO's Director of Elections, Geingob, along with other members of his directorate, established SWAPO election centres throughout the country and spearheaded an election campaign that brought SWAPO to power in Namibia.

On 21 November 1989, after the elections, he was elected chairman of the Constituent Assembly, which was responsible for formulating the Namibian Constitution. But before a constitution could be formulated, he had to ensure that the Constituent Assembly went through a process of confidence building between the people, who were suspicious of each other. Subsequently, the preamble to the Namibian Constitution stated that the government would strive to achieve national reconciliation. Under Geingob's chairmanship, the Constituent Assembly unanimously adopted the Namibian Constitution on 9 February 1990.

=== First Prime Minister tenure ===
Geingob's first tenure as prime minister lasted for 12 years, from 1990 to 2002. As Prime Minister, Geingob introduced modern management approaches to the government; he was also committed to nature conservation coupled with tourism, and in the early 1990s opened the Ongava Lodge, just south of Etosha National Park.

=== Hiatus from political office ===
In a cabinet reshuffle on 27 August 2002, Geingob was replaced as prime minister by Theo-Ben Gurirab and appointed Minister of Regional and Local Government and Housing but declined to accept this lesser position. He had placed ninth, with 368 votes, in the election to the central committee of SWAPO at the party's August 2002 congress, but on 15 September, he failed to be reelected to the SWAPO politburo; he received 33 votes from the 83-member central committee, while the lowest scoring successful candidate received 35 votes.

In February 2003, Geingob became the Executive Secretary of the Global Coalition for Africa, based in Washington, D.C.

=== Return to parliament ===
In the nomination of SWAPO parliamentary candidates by party delegates on 2 October 2004, Geingob, at the time still in Washington working for the Global Coalition for Africa, placed 28th out of 60. He then left the Global Coalition for Africa and returned to Namibia to participate in the November 2004 parliamentary election, in which he won a seat.

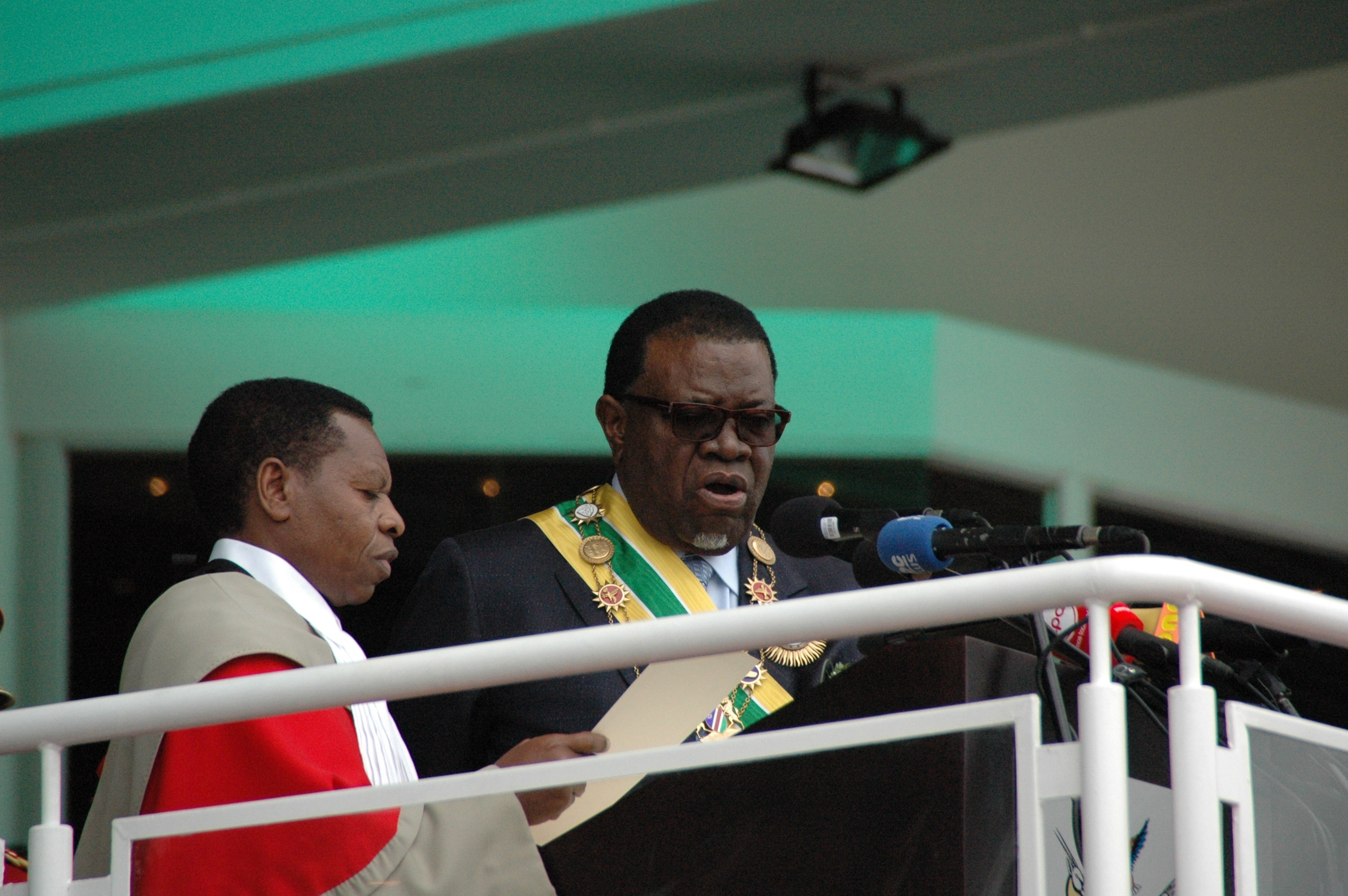
Swearing-in of President Hage Geingob (2015)

Geingob became the party Chief Whip of SWAPO in the National Assembly on 18 April 2007. He was brought back into the SWAPO politburo in mid-2007, filling one of two vacancies. In November 2007, a few weeks before a party congress, the politburo named Geingob its sole candidate for the position of vice-president of SWAPO. At the congress, he was accordingly elected without opposition on 29 November 2007 and appointed Minister of Trade and Industry on 8 April 2008.

=== Second Prime Ministership ===
At SWAPO's 2012 party congress, Geingob was reelected as vice-president on 2 December, a result which was considered likely to make him the successor of Hifikepunye Pohamba as president of Namibia in 2015. Geingob received 312 votes from the delegates, while Jerry Ekandjo received 220 and Pendukeni Iivula-Ithana 64. Following the congress, Pohamba appointed Geingob prime minister on 4 December 2012.

=== President of Namibia ===
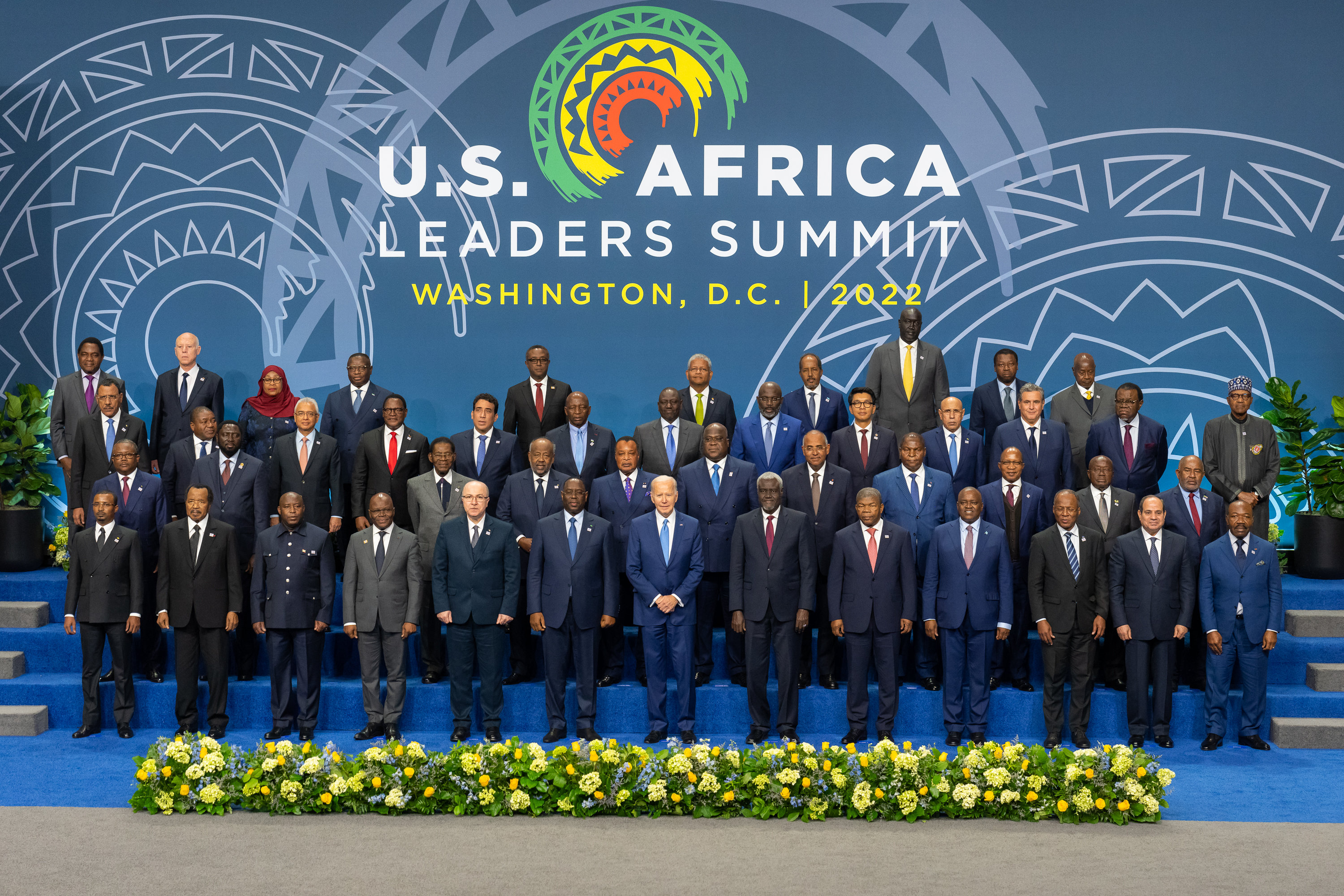
Geingob and US President Joe Biden at the United States–Africa Leaders Summit in Washington, December 2022

As the SWAPO candidate, Geingob was elected President of Namibia by an overwhelming margin on 28 November 2014, receiving 87% of the vote. He was sworn in as president on 21 March 2015. During his first term, he instituted social programs for the elderly and pushed for the development of renewable energy. However, his administration largely failed to alleviate poverty. He was criticized for spending too much money on a bloated administration and granting contracts to foreign companies instead of Namibian companies. Namibia's gender inequality gap decreased during his presidency.

While speaking to newspaper The Namibian in December 2016, he dared the United States to join the International Criminal Court to reassure African nations that the court is not particularly targeting Africans. Geingob was the chairperson of SADC after being elected to the position in 2018.

In November 2019, Geingob was reelected with 56.3% of the vote.

In February 2023, Geingob hosted First Lady of the United States Jill Biden, the highest-level official from the U.S. to visit Namibia since Al Gore in 1996.

In March 2023, Geingob named Netumbo Nandi-Ndaitwah as the SWAPO presidential candidate in the 2024 Namibian general election.

After the Supreme Court of Namibia ruled in favor of equal treatment for two foreign same-sex spouses of Namibian citizens in May 2023, Geingob did not sign a bill passed by the National Assembly that sought to invalidate the verdict.

In January 2024, Geingob supported South Africa's ICJ genocide case against Israel, saying that "No peace-loving human being can ignore the carnage waged against Palestinians in Gaza." He also criticized Germany for supporting Israel, citing the Herero and Nama genocide by colonial authorities in then-German South West Africa.

During his tenure, he was known for maintaining good relations with a variety of countries including the United States, China, and Russia.

== Controversy ==
In April 2021, the Organised Crime and Corruption Reporting Project and The Namibian reported that Geingob was involved in the Fishrot scandal by allegedly instructing a government official to divert funds from a state-run fishing company to bribe attendees of the 2017 SWAPO electoral congress to vote for him. According to a source in the OCCRP investigation, Geingob allegedly asked James Hatuikulipi, then chairman of the state-owned fishing company Fishcor, to set up an elaborate corporate structure to siphon public funds generated from the country’s lucrative fishing resources. According to bank records analyzed by OCCRP, front companies set up by SWAPO proxies transferred $4.5m through this scheme between July 2017 and November 2018.

== Personal life ==
Geingob was known to be a die-hard football fan and attended many high-profile games. When he was young, he played football. Geingob also enjoyed to watch football games. He regularly attended the Namibia Annual Music Awards (NAMAs), and in his youth sang in a choir, and played in a band.

In 1967, Geingob married Priscilla Charlene Cash, a New York City native; the couple had one daughter, Nangula. Geingob later married Loini Kandume, a businesswoman, on 11 September 1993, in Windhoek, in a high-profile marriage that resulted in two children: a daughter and a son. Geingob married Monica Kalondo on 14 February 2015.

== Illness, death, and funeral ==
In 2013, Geingob underwent brain surgery. Geingob later said that he survived prostate cancer in 2014. He underwent heart valve surgery in South Africa in June 2023.

On 8 January 2024, Geingob announced that he was diagnosed again with cancer after a colonoscopy and a gastroscopy. He subsequently went for treatment in the United States on 25 January and returned to Namibia on 30 January following two days of treatment. On 4 February, Vice President Nangolo Mbumba announced that Geingob had died at Lady Pohamba Private Hospital in Windhoek, where he had been receiving treatment. Minister of Environment, Forestry, and Tourism Pohamba Shifeta subsequently disclosed that Geingob had told him in December 2023 that he had only six months to live.

Mbumba was formally sworn into office as acting President of Namibia at a hastily arranged ceremony at State House in Windhoek, about 15 hours after Geingob's death. A government spokesperson said that Mbumba would serve the remainder of Geingob's term, which expired on 21 March 2025.

The minister of information and communication technology, Peya Mushelenga announced that a period of national mourning would begin on 4 February until Geingob's funeral at the Auas Mountains on 25 February. President Mbumba later amended the mourning period to last from 5 to 25 February and decreed a state funeral for him at the Heroes' Acre in Windhoek on 25 February. He also conferred Geingob with the posthumous honor of National Hero. Geingob's death prompted calls for Namibia to establish official guidelines on the deaths of incumbent and former heads of state.

Mozambique declared five days of mourning, Zambia and Cuba declared two days of mourning.

During the mourning period, Geingob was laid at the State House, his private residence of Casa Rosalia, and Parliament Gardens, with processions held in Windhoek during the transfers. His funeral on 25 February 2024 was attended by at least 20 heads of state, including those of Qatar, Tanzania, Germany, Finland, South Africa, Angola, Botswana, Burundi, Democratic Republic of Congo, Kenya, Ghana, Lesotho, Madagascar, Malawi, Mozambique, Sierra Leone, Zambia and Zimbabwe. High-level delegations were also sent by the African Union, the United States, the United Kingdom, China, and Algeria. Several former heads of state also attended his funeral.

== Legacy ==
Hage Geingob Rugby Stadium, Hage G. Geingob High School and the University of Namibia's Medical School Campus both in Windhoek are named after him.

On 3 August 2024, on what would have been Geingob's 83rd birthday, President Nangolo Mbumba named the B6 Highway as Dr. Hage Geingob highway.

== Awards, honors, and recognition ==
- In 1980, awarded the Palmes académiques (Officer Class) by the French Government in recognition of valuable services in education.
- In 1987, awarded Omugulugwombashe Medal (SWAPO) for bravery and long service.
- In 1994, awarded LL.D. Honoris Causa by Columbia College, Illinois.
- In 1994, awarded the second highest order in Cuba, Carlos Manuel de Céspedes.
- In 1994, awarded the Order of the Sun, 1st Class by the Government of Namibia for providing outstanding political leadership.
- In 1995, awarded LL.D. (Doctorate of Laws) Honoris Causa by the University of Delhi, India.
- In 1997, awarded LL.D. (Doctorate of Laws) Honoris Causa by the University of Namibia.
- In 1998, awarded a Doctorate of Humane Letters (Honoris Causa) by The American University of Rome.
- In 2001, a new school aimed at educating deprived children was opened in Katutura and named after the president. The Hage G. Geingob High School educates many from the informal settlements around Windhoek.
- In 2015, was conferred the Order of the Welwitschia by then-President Hifikepunye Pohamba, upon Geingob inauguration as Namibia's third President on 21 March 2015

== Research activities and publications ==
Hage Geingob received his Ph.D. from the University of Leeds. His thesis was entitled "State Formation in Namibia: Promoting Democracy and Good Governance". In his thesis, he examined significant events in the formation of Namibia and provided insight into the role played by various actors involved in molding Namibia's evolution as a state. He also examined the efforts of Namibians to build a society out of diverse and stratified racial and ethnic groups that were often opposed to each other, to promote democracy and a policy of reconciliation, to improve the condition of the previously disadvantaged groups through affirmative action, to encourage good governance, to promote a culture that respects human rights, and to build state institutions that support these policies. Finally, he carried out a democratic audit of Namibia.

As the director of the Institute for Namibia and as the chairman of the Research Coordinating Committee, Hage Geingob oversaw all research activities at the United Nations Institute for Namibia. The result of this effort resulted in 22 published research studies.

Geingob was also the chairman of the most comprehensive study ever undertaken on Namibia, Namibia: Perspectives for National Reconstruction and Development, which was undertaken by the United Nations Institute for Namibia in pursuance of the mandate given to it by the United Nations General Assembly. This study covered all aspects of socio-economic reconstruction and development for independent Namibia. This study came to be known as the "Blue Bible", referring to the color of its cover, among the researchers and planners of Namibia. Indeed, this study provided the blueprint for setting up the new government in independent Namibia.

In addition, Geingob contributed numerous articles to various publications, including monographs, periodicals, and newspapers.

Geingob traveled extensively covering all the continents and attended, chaired, and presented papers at numerous UN and other international conferences. He also regularly attended the General Assembly sessions from 1965 to 1985.

Political offices
New office	Prime Minister of Namibia; 1990–2002	Succeeded by Theo-Ben Gurirab
Preceded by Immanuel Ngatjizeko	Minister of Trade and Industry; 2008–2012	Succeeded by Calle Schlettwein
Preceded by Nahas Angula	Prime Minister of Namibia; 2012–2015	Succeeded by Saara Kuugongelwa
Preceded by Hifikepunye Pohamba	President of Namibia; 2015–2024	Succeeded by Nangolo Mbumba
Party political offices
Preceded by Hifikepunye Pohamba	SWAPO nominee for President of Namibia; 2014, 2019	Succeeded by Netumbo Nandi-Ndaitwah
Preceded by Hifikepunye Pohamba	President of SWAPO; 2017–2024	Succeeded by TBA
