= Peter Shivute =

Namibian judge (born 1963)

His Lordship Peter Shivute
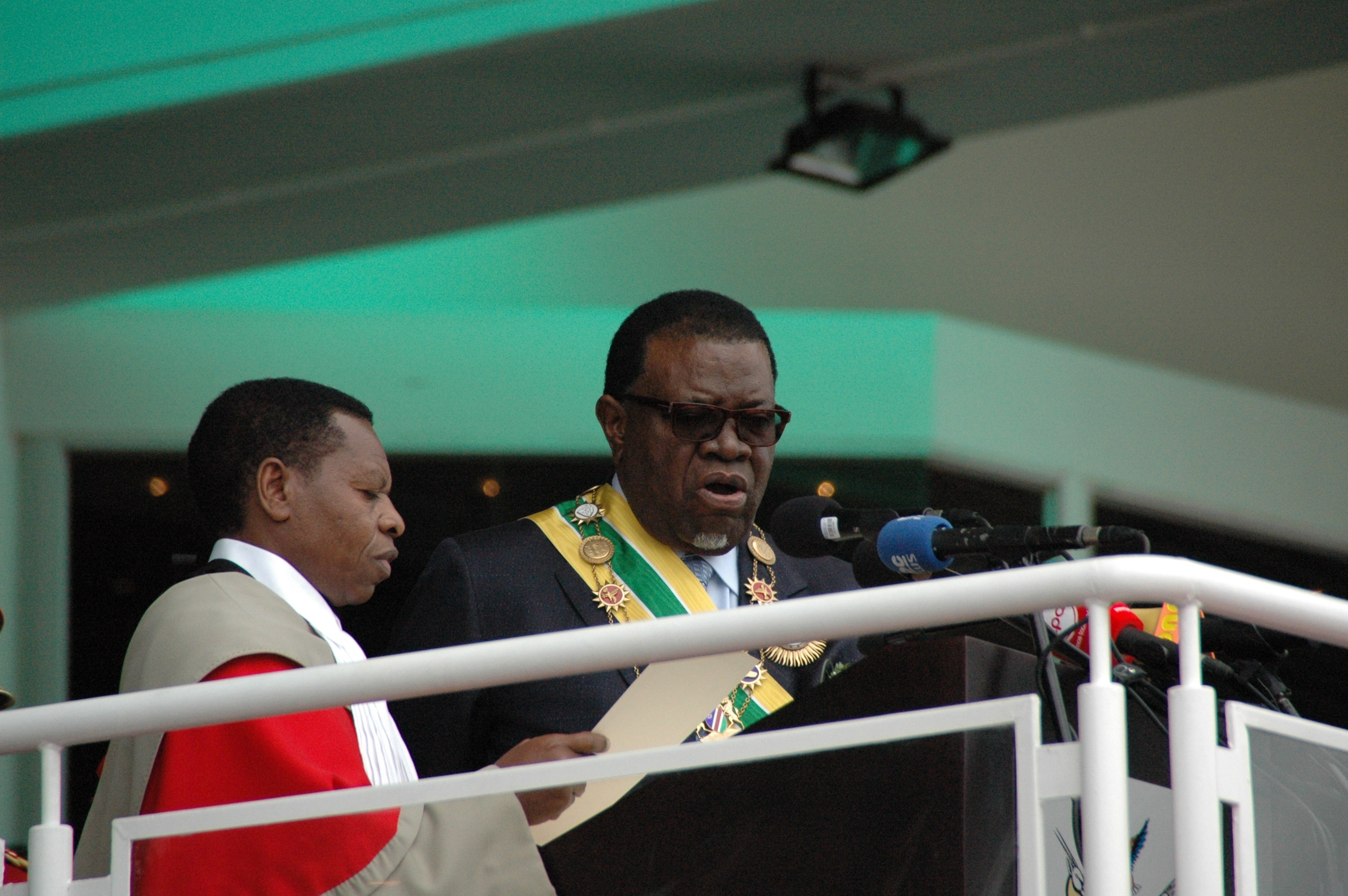
- Peter Shivute (left) at the swearing-in of President Hage Geingob (2015)

Chief Justice of Namibia
- Incumbent
- Assumed office 1 December 2004
- Deputy: Petrus Damaseb
- Preceded by: Johan Strydom

Personal details
- Born: 25 September 1963 (age 63) Ovamboland, South West Africa (now Namibia)
- Education: University of Cambridge; University of Warwick

Peter Sam Shivute (born 25 September 1963) is a Namibian judge who has served as the chief justice of the Supreme Court of Namibia since 2004. He is the first black Namibian to be appointed to this position.

== Early life and education ==
Shivute was born in Ovamboland in South West Africa (now Namibia). At the age of 16, he went into exile, continuing his secondary school education in Zambia.

While still in Zambia, he received a Diploma in Legal Studies with distinction in 1986.

He left Zambia for the United Kingdom where he obtained a Bachelor of Laws, with honors, from Trinity Hall College, University of Cambridge in 1991. After working in now independent Namibia for four years, he returned to the UK to complete a Master of Laws from University of Warwick in 1996. Shivute further holds a Diploma in Development Studies and Management.

== Legal career ==
Peter Shivute was appointed as a magistrate in the Judicial Service of the Republic of Zambia in 1987 at the age of 24. On his return from exile he served as magistrate in the Namibian judiciary from 1991 to 2000, as Judge, later Judge President, of the High Court.

On 1 December 2004, Shivute was appointed Chief Justice of Namibia, the highest judicial officer in the country as head of the Supreme Court. He is the fourth Namibian Chief Justice, succeeding Johan Strydom who retired in 2003. He is also the chairman of the Judicial Service Commission of Namibia and the Board of Legal Education. In 2002, he chaired the Third Delimitation Commission of Namibia, a body that infrequently decides on the administrative division of the country.

Shivute frequently publishes on politics, human rights, and the law in Namibia. He is married to fellow judge Naomi Shivute.
