= Chief Justice of Namibia =

Head judge of the Supreme Court of Namibia

The chief justice of Namibia is the head of the Supreme Court of Namibia, the highest appellate court in Namibia. It is the highest post in the Namibian judicial system, presiding over the operation of the supreme court. The position was created on 21 March 1990, the day of Namibian independence, along with the foundation of the Supreme Court.

The chief justice is responsible for the swearing-in of members of the National Assembly as well as the president of Namibia, and further for the safekeeping of the presidential symbols of the power (constitution, seal of state, and national flag) during the handover from one president to another. They can further request the Namibian president to appoint Acting Judges, either to fill temporary vacancies, or to supplement the jury ad hoc with experts on certain legal issues.

The Chief Justice and all other judges are appointed by the President of Namibia on the recommendation of the Judicial Service Commission in which the Chief Justice is a member. Other members of this commission are the Attorney-General of Namibia, a judge appointed by the President, and two representatives of the legal fraternity.

== Appointment controversy ==
While Namibia's constitution enshrines the independence of the judiciary, appointment of judges lies in the power of the president. In 2002, the official retirement age for judges in Namibia was amended from 70 to 65. At reaching retirement age, judges including the Chief Justice can only be reappointed in acting position. This change cut short the term of Namibia's third Chief Justice Johan Strydom who became 65 in June 2003, a move that was speculated to be part of a plan to appoint a Chief Justice with close ties to SWAPO, the ruling party.

== List of chief justices ==
As a legacy of the Commonwealth of Nations, Justices in Namibia bear the title Lord. The present chief justice is His Lordship Peter Shivute.

No.	Chief Justice	Start of Term	End of Term
1	Hans Joachim Berker	21 March 1990	5 July 1992
2	Ismael Mahomed	July 1992	1999
3	Johan Strydom	March 1999	June 2003
-	Johan Strydom (acting)	June 2003	September 2004
-	Simpson Mutambanengwe (acting)	October 2004	November 2004
4	Peter Shivute	1 December 2004	Incumbent
