= History of Namibia =

The history of Namibia has passed through several distinct stages from being colonised in the late nineteenth century to Namibia's independence on 21 March 1990.

From 1884, Namibia was a German colony: German South West Africa. After the First World War, the League of Nations gave South Africa a mandate to administer the territory. Following World War II, the League of Nations was dissolved in April 1946 and its successor, the United Nations, instituted a trusteeship system to reform the administration of the former League of Nations mandates and clearly establish majority rule and independence as eventual goals for the trust territories. South Africa objected arguing that a majority of the territory's people were content with South African rule.

Legal argument ensued over the course of the next twenty years until, in October 1966, the UN General Assembly decided to end the mandate, declaring that South Africa had no further right to administer the territory, and that henceforth South West Africa was to come under the direct responsibility of the UN (Resolution 2145 XXI of 27 October 1966).

== Pre-colonial history ==
As early as 25 000 B.C., the first humans lived in the Huns Mountains in the South of Namibia. The painted stone plates that exist from that time not only prove that these settlements existed, they also belong among the oldest works of art in the world. A fragment of a hominoid jaw, estimated to be thirteen million years old, was found in the Otavi Mountains. Findings of Stone Age weapons and tools are further proof that a long time ago early humans already hunted the wild animals of the region.

In the Brandberg Mountains, there are numerous rock paintings, most of them originating from around 2000 B.C. There is no reliable indication as to which ethnic groups created them. It is debatable whether the San (Bushmen), who alongside the Damara are the oldest ethnic group in Namibia, were the creators of these paintings.

The Nama only settled in southern Africa and southern Namibia during the first century B.C. In contrast to the San and Damara, they lived on the livestock they bred themselves.

=== The north – the Ovambo and Kavango ===
The Ovambo, and the smaller and closely related group Kavango, lived in northern Namibia, southern Angola and, in the case of the Kavango, western Zambia. Being settled people they had an economy based on farming, cattle and fishing, but they also produced metal goods. Both groups belonged to the Bantu nation. They rarely ventured south to the central parts of the country, since the conditions there did not suit their farming way of life, but they extensively traded their knives and agricultural implements.

=== Bantu Migration – the Herero ===
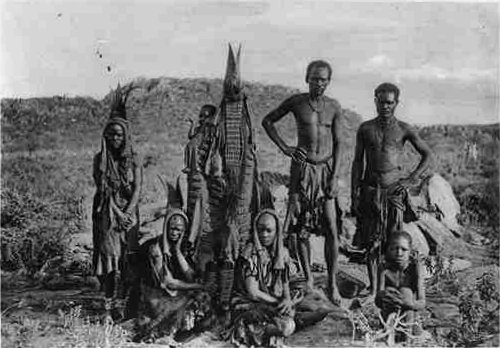
Herero circa 1910

During the 17th century the Herero, a pastoral, nomadic people keeping cattle, moved into Namibia. They came from the east African lakes and entered Namibia from the northwest. First they resided in Kaokoland, but in the middle of the 19th century some tribes moved farther south and into Damaraland. A number of tribes remained in Kaokoland: these were the Himba people, who are still there today. During German occupation of South West Africa about one third of the population was wiped out in a genocide that continues to provoke widespread indignation. An apology was sought in more recent times.

=== The Oorlams ===
In the 19th century white farmers, mostly Boers, moved further north, pushing the indigenous Khoisan peoples, who put up a fierce resistance, across the Orange River. Known as Oorlams, these Khoisan adopted Boer customs and spoke a language similar to Afrikaans. Armed with guns, the Oorlams caused instability as more and more came to settle in Namaqualand and eventually conflict arose between them and the Nama. Under the leadership of Jonker Afrikaner, the Oorlams used their superior weapons to take control of the best grazing land. In the 1830s Jonker Afrikaner concluded an agreement with the Nama chief Oaseb whereby the Oorlams would protect the central grasslands of Namibia from the Herero who were then pushing south. In return Jonker Afrikaner was recognised as overlord, received tribute from the Nama, and settled at what today is Windhoek, on the borders of Herero territory. The Afrikaners soon came in conflict with the Herero who entered Damaraland from the south at about the same time as the Afrikaner started to expand farther north from Namaqualand. Both the Herero and the Afrikaner wanted to use the grasslands of Damaraland for their herds. This resulted in warfare between the Herero and the Oorlams as well as between the two of them and the Damara, who were the original inhabitants of the area. The Damara were displaced by the fighting and many were killed.

With their horses and guns, the Afrikaners proved to be militarily superior and forced the Herero to give them cattle as tribute.

=== Baster immigration ===
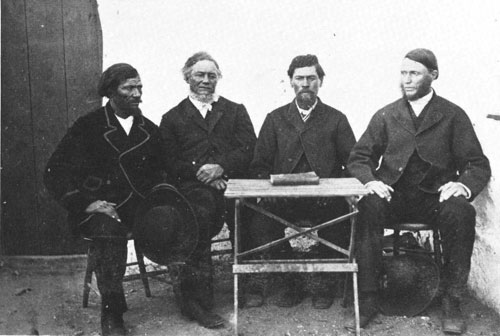
The first council of the Rehoboth Basters 1872, with the constitution lying on the table.

The last group of people today considered indigenous that arrived in Namibia were the Basters; descendants of Boer men and African women (mostly Khoisan). Being Calvinist and Afrikaans-speaking, they considered themselves to be culturally more "white" than "black". As with the Oorlams, they were forced northwards by the expansion of white settlers when, in 1868, a group of about 90 families crossed the Orange River into Namibia. The Basters settled in central Namibia, where they founded the city Rehoboth. In 1872 they founded the "Free Republic of Rehoboth" and adopted a constitution stating that the nation should be led by a "Kaptein" directly elected by the people, and that there should be a small parliament, or Volkraad, consisting of three directly elected citizens.

=== European influence and colonization ===
Detail of a map of Southern Africa from 1707, labelling the area as the Kaffir Coast (Latin: Costa de Caffares).

The first European to set foot on Namibian soil was the Portuguese Diogo Cão in 1485, who stopped briefly on the Skeleton Coast, and raised a limestone cross there, on his exploratory mission along the west coast of Africa. The next European to visit Namibia was also a Portuguese, Bartholomeu Dias, who stopped at what today is known as Walvis Bay and Lüderitz (which he named Angra Pequena) on his way to round the Cape of Good Hope. The inhospitable Namib Desert constituted a formidable barrier and neither of the Portuguese explorers went far inland.

The area was vaguely regarded as Cafreria ("the land of the kaffirs") and similar terms over the next few centuries.

In 1793 the Dutch authority in the Cape decided to take control of Walvis Bay, since it was the only good deep-water harbour along the Skeleton Coast. When the United Kingdom took control of the Cape Colony in 1805, they also took over Walvis Bay. But colonial settlement in the area was limited, and neither the Dutch nor the British penetrated far into the country.

One of the first European groups to show interest in Namibia were the missionaries. In 1805 the London Missionary Society began working in Namibia, moving north from the Cape Colony. In 1811 they founded the town Bethanie in southern Namibia, where they built a church, which was long considered to be Namibia's oldest building, before the site at ǁKhauxaǃnas which pre-dates European settlement was recognised.

In the 1840s the German Rhenish Mission Society started working in Namibia and co-operating with the London Missionary Society. It was not until the 19th century, when European powers sought to carve up the African continent between them in the so-called "Scramble for Africa", that Europeans – Germany in the forefront – became interested in Namibia.

The first territorial claim on a part of Namibia came when Britain occupied Walvis Bay, confirming the settlement of 1797, and permitted the Cape Colony to annex it in 1878. The annexation was an attempt to forestall German ambitions in the area, and it also guaranteed control of the good deepwater harbour on the way to the Cape Colony and other British colonies on Africa's east coast.

Lüderitz in 1884.

In 1883, a German trader, Adolf Lüderitz, bought Angra Pequena from the Nama chief Josef Frederiks II. The price he paid was 10,000 marks (ℳ) and 260 guns. He soon renamed the coastal area after himself, giving it the name Lüderitz. Believing that Britain was soon about to declare the whole area a protectorate, Lüderitz advised the German chancellor Otto von Bismarck to claim it. In 1884 Bismarck did so, thereby establishing German South West Africa as a colony (Deutsch-Südwestafrika in German).

A region, the Caprivi Strip, became a part of German South West Africa after the Heligoland-Zanzibar Treaty on 1 July 1890, between the United Kingdom and Germany. The Caprivi Strip in Namibia gave Germany access to the Zambezi River and thereby to German colonies in East Africa. In exchange for the island of Heligoland in the North Sea, Britain assumed control of the island of Zanzibar in East Africa.

== German South West Africa ==
Flag of German South West Africa

Soon after declaring Lüderitz and a vast area along the Atlantic coast a German protectorate, German troops were deployed as conflicts with the native tribes flared up, most significantly with the Nama. Under the leadership of the tribal chief Hendrik Witbooi, the Nama put up a fierce resistance to the German occupation. Contemporary media called the conflict "The Hottentot Uprising".

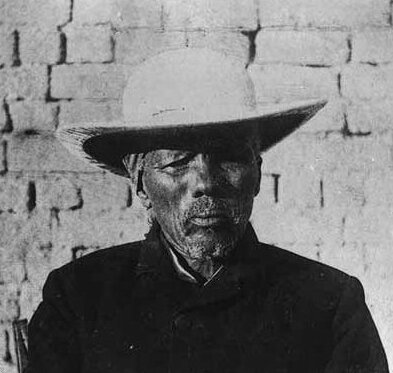
Nama chief Hendrik Witbooi

The Nama's resistance proved to be unsuccessful, however, and in 1894 Witbooi was forced to sign a "protection treaty" with the Germans. The treaty allowed the Nama to keep their arms, and Witbooi was released having given his word of honour not to continue with the Hottentot uprising.

In 1894 major Theodor Leutwein was appointed governor of German South West Africa. He tried without great success to apply the principle of "colonialism without bloodshed". The protection treaty did have the effect of stabilising the situation but pockets of rebellion persisted, and were put down by an elite German regiment Schutztruppe, while real peace was never achieved between the colonialists and the natives. The introduction of a veterinary pest-exclusion fence called the Red Line, which separated the north from the rest of the territory, led to more direct colonial rule south of the line and indirect control north of the line, leading to different political and economic outcomes for example between the northern Ovambo people compared to the more centrally located Herero people.

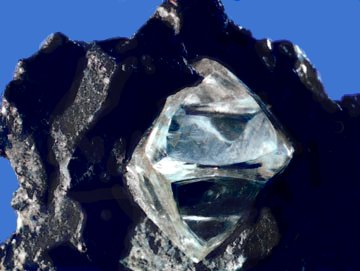
A diamond

Being the only German colony in Africa considered suitable for white settlement at the time, Namibia attracted an influx of German settlers. In 1903 there were 3,700 Germans living in the area, and by 1910 their number had increased to 13,000. Another reason for German settlement was the discovery of diamonds in 1908. Diamond production continues to be a very important part of Namibia's economy.

The settlers were encouraged by the government to expropriate land from the natives, and forced labour – hard to distinguish from slavery – was used. As a result, relations between the German settlers and the natives deteriorated.

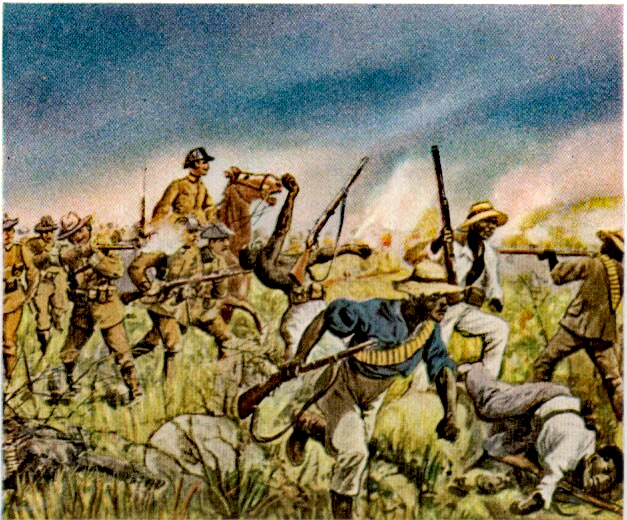
German troops in combat with the Herero in a painting by Richard Knötel.

=== The Herero and Nama wars ===
The ongoing local rebellions escalated in 1904 into the Herero and Nama Wars when the Herero attacked remote farms on the countryside, killing approximately 150 Germans.

The outbreak of rebellion was considered to be a result of Theodor Leutwein's softer tactics, and he was replaced by the more notorious General Lothar von Trotha.

In the beginning of the war the Herero, under the leadership of chief Samuel Maharero, had the upper hand. With good knowledge of the terrain they had little problem in defending themselves against the Schutztruppe (initially numbering only 766). Soon the Nama people joined the war, again under the leadership of Hendrik Witbooi.

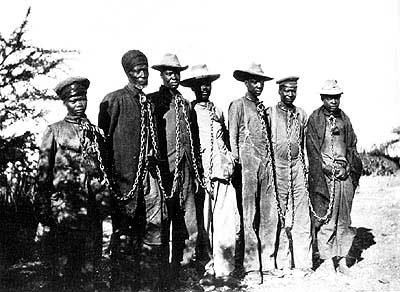
Herero chained during 1904 rebellion.

To cope with the situation, Germany sent 14,000 additional troops who soon crushed the rebellion in the Battle of Waterberg in 1904. Earlier von Trotha issued an ultimatum to the Herero, denying them citizenship rights and ordering them to leave the country or be killed. To escape, the Herero retreated into the waterless Omaheke region, a western arm of the Kalahari Desert, where many of them died of thirst. The German forces guarded every water source and were given orders to shoot any adult male Herero on sight; later orders included killing all Herero and Nama, including children. Only a few of them managed to escape into neighbouring British territories. These tragic events, known as the Herero and Nama Genocide, resulted in the death of between 24,000 and 65,000 Herero (estimated at 50% to 70% of the total Herero population) and 10,000 Nama (50% of the total Nama population). The genocide was characterized by widespread death by starvation and from consumption of well water which had been poisoned by the Germans in the Namib Desert.

Descendants of Lothar von Trotha apologized to six chiefs of Herero royal houses for the actions of their ancestor on 7 October 2007.

== South African rule ==
In 1915, during World War I, South Africa launched a military campaign and occupied the German colony of South West Africa.

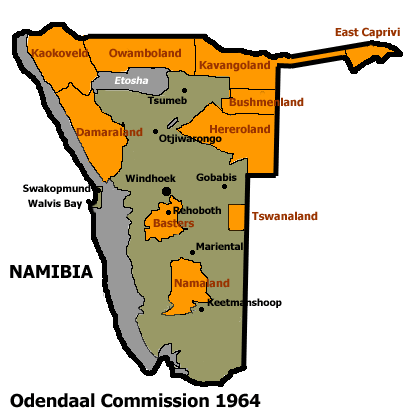
The Odendaal Plan for dividing Namibia into bantustans

In February 1917, Mandume Ya Ndemufayo, the last king of the Kwanyama of Ovamboland, was killed in a joint attack by South African forces for resisting South African sovereignty over his people.

On 17 December 1920, South Africa undertook administration of South West Africa under the terms of Article 22 of the Covenant of the League of Nations and a Class C Mandate agreement by the League Council. The Class C mandate, supposed to be used for the least developed territories, gave South Africa full power of administration and legislation over the territory, but required that South Africa promote the material and moral well-being and social progress of the people.

Following the League's supersession by the United Nations in 1946, South Africa refused to surrender its earlier mandate to be replaced by a United Nations Trusteeship agreement, requiring closer international monitoring of the territory's administration. Although the South African government wanted to incorporate South West Africa into its territory, it never officially did so, although it was administered as the de facto 'fifth province', with the white minority having representation in the whites-only Parliament of South Africa. In 1959, the colonial forces in Windhoek sought to remove black residents further away from the white area of town. The residents protested and the subsequent killing of eleven protesters spawned a major Namibian nationalist following and the formation of united black opposition to South African rule.

During the 1960s, as the European powers granted independence to their colonies and trust territories in Africa, pressure mounted on South Africa to do so in Namibia, which was then South West Africa. On the dismissal (1966) by the International Court of Justice of a complaint brought by Ethiopia and Liberia against South Africa's continued presence in the territory, the U.N. General Assembly revoked South Africa's mandate. Under the growing international pressure to legitimize its annexation of Namibia, South Africa established in 1962 the ‘Commission of Enquiry into South West Africa Affairs’, better known as the Odendaal commission, named after Frans Hendrik Odendaal, who headed the commission. Its goal was to introduce South African racist homeland politics in Namibia, while at the same time present the occupation as a progressive and scientific way to develop and support the people in Namibia.

=== Namibian struggle for independence ===
In 1966, South West Africa People's Organisation's (SWAPO) military wing, the People's Liberation Army of Namibia (PLAN) began guerrilla attacks on South African forces, infiltrating the territory from bases in Zambia. The first attack of this kind was the battle at Omugulugwombashe on 26 August. After Angola became independent in 1975, SWAPO established bases in the southern part of the country. Hostilities intensified over the years, especially in Ovamboland.

In a 1971 advisory opinion, the International Court of Justice upheld UN authority over Namibia, determining that the South African presence in Namibia was illegal and that South Africa therefore was obliged to withdraw its administration from Namibia immediately. The Court also advised UN member states to refrain from implying legal recognition or assistance to the South African presence.

The summer 1971-72 saw a general strike of 25% of the entire working population of contract workers (13,000 people), starting in Windhoek and Walvis Bay and soon spreading to Tsumeb and other mines. In response to the contract system, which has been characterized close to slavery, and in support of Namibian independence.

In 1975, South Africa sponsored the Turnhalle Constitutional Conference, which sought an "internal settlement" to Namibia. Excluding SWAPO, the conference mainly included bantustan leaders as well as white Namibian political parties.

=== International pressure ===
In 1977, the Western Contact Group (WCG) was formed including Canada, France, West Germany, the United Kingdom, and the United States. They launched a joint diplomatic effort to bring an internationally acceptable transition to independence for Namibia. The WCG's efforts led to the presentation in 1978 of Security Council Resolution 435 for settling the Namibian problem. The settlement proposal, as it became known, was worked out after lengthy consultations with South Africa, the front-line states (Angola, Botswana, Mozambique, Tanzania, Zambia, and Zimbabwe), SWAPO, UN officials, and the Western Contact Group. It called for the holding of elections in Namibia under UN supervision and control, the cessation of all hostile acts by all parties, and restrictions on the activities of South African and Namibian military, paramilitary, and police.

South Africa agreed to cooperate in achieving the implementation of Resolution 435. Nonetheless, in December 1978, in defiance of the UN proposal, it unilaterally held elections, which were boycotted by SWAPO and a few other political parties. South Africa continued to administer Namibia through its installed multiracial coalitions and an appointed Administrator-General. Negotiations after 1978 focused on issues such as supervision of elections connected with the implementation of the settlement proposal.

=== Negotiations and transition ===
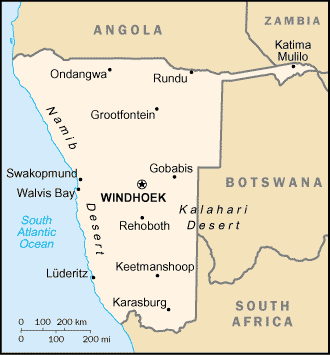
Map of South West Africa (Namibia)

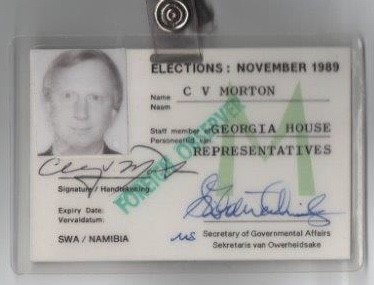
Identification badge of a Foreign Observer issued during the 1989 election – (Chesley V. Morton of the Georgia House of Representatives)

In the period, four UN Commissioners for Namibia were appointed. South Africa refused to recognize any of these United Nations appointees. Nevertheless, discussions proceeded with UN Commissioner for Namibia N°2 Martti Ahtisaari who played a key role in getting the Constitutional Principles agreed in 1982 by the front-line states, SWAPO, and the Western Contact Group. This agreement created the framework for Namibia's democratic constitution. The US Government's role as mediator was both critical and disputed throughout the period, one example being the intense efforts in 1984 to obtain withdrawal of the South African Defence Force (SADF) from southern Angola. The so-called "constructive engagement" by US diplomatic interests was viewed negatively by those who supported internationally recognised independence, while to others US policy seemed to be aimed more towards restraining Soviet-Cuban influence in Angola and linking that to the issue of Namibian independence. In addition, US moves seemed to encourage the South Africans to delay independence by taking initiatives that would keep the Soviet-Cubans in Angola, such as dominating large tracts of southern Angola militarily while at the same time providing surrogate forces for the Angolan opposition movement, UNITA. From 1985 to 1989, a Transitional Government of National Unity, backed by South Africa and various ethnic political parties, tried unsuccessfully for recognition by the United Nations. Finally, in 1987 when prospects for Namibian independence seemed to be improving, the fourth UN Commissioner for Namibia Bernt Carlsson was appointed. Upon South Africa's relinquishing control of Namibia, Commissioner Carlsson's role would be to administer the country, formulate its framework constitution, and organize free and fair elections based upon a non-racial universal franchise.

In May 1988, a US mediation team – headed by Chester A. Crocker, US Assistant Secretary of State for African Affairs – brought negotiators from Angola, Cuba, and South Africa, and observers from the Soviet Union together in London. Intense diplomatic activity characterized the next 7 months, as the parties worked out agreements to bring peace to the region and make possible the implementation of UN Security Council Resolution 435 (UNSCR 435). At the Ronald Reagan/Mikhail Gorbachev summit in Moscow (29 May – 1 June 1988) between leaders of the United States and the Soviet Union, it was decided that Cuban troops would be withdrawn from Angola, and Soviet military aid would cease, as soon as South Africa withdrew from Namibia. Agreements to give effect to these decisions were drawn up for signature in New York in December 1988. Cuba, South Africa, and the People's Republic of Angola agreed to a complete withdrawal of foreign troops from Angola. This agreement, known as the Brazzaville Protocol, established a Joint Monitoring Commission (JMC) with the United States and the Soviet Union as observers. The Tripartite Accord, comprising a bilateral agreement between Cuba and Angola, and a tripartite agreement between Angola, Cuba and South Africa whereby South Africa agreed to hand control of Namibia to the United Nations, were signed at UN headquarters in New York City on 22 December 1988. (UN Commissioner N°4 Bernt Carlsson was not present at the signing ceremony. He was killed on flight Pan Am 103 which exploded over Lockerbie, Scotland on 21 December 1988 en route from London to New York. South African foreign minister, Pik Botha, and an official delegation of 22 had a lucky escape. Their booking on Pan Am 103 was cancelled at the last minute and Pik Botha, together with a smaller delegation, caught the earlier Pan Am 101 flight to New York.)

Within a month of the signing of the New York Accords, South African president P. W. Botha suffered a mild stroke, which prevented him from attending a meeting with Namibian leaders on 20 January 1989. His place was taken by acting president J. Christiaan Heunis. Botha had fully recuperated by 1 April 1989 when implementation of UNSCR 435 officially started and the South African–appointed Administrator-General, Louis Pienaar, began the territory's transition to independence. Former UN Commissioner N°2 and now UN Special Representative Martti Ahtisaari arrived in Windhoek in April 1989 to head the UN Transition Assistance Group's (UNTAG) mission.

The transition got off to a shaky start. Contrary to SWAPO President Sam Nujoma's written assurances to the UN Secretary General to abide by a cease-fire and repatriate only unarmed Namibians, it was alleged that approximately 2,000 armed members of the People's Liberation Army of Namibia (PLAN), SWAPO's military wing, crossed the border from Angola in an apparent attempt to establish a military presence in northern Namibia. UNTAG's Martti Ahtisaari took advice from Margaret Thatcher, who was visiting Southern Africa at the time, and authorized a limited contingent of South African troops to assist the South West African Police in restoring order. A period of intense fighting followed, during which 375 PLAN fighters were killed. At a hastily arranged meeting of the Joint Monitoring Commission in Mount Etjo, a game park outside Otjiwarongo, it was agreed to confine the South African forces to base and return PLAN elements to Angola. While that problem was resolved, minor disturbances in the north continued throughout the transition period.

In October 1989, under orders of the UN Security Council, Pretoria was forced to demobilize some 1,600 members of Koevoet (Afrikaans for crowbar). The Koevoet issue had been one of the most difficult UNTAG faced. This counter-insurgency unit was formed by South Africa after the adoption of UNSCR 435, and was not, therefore, mentioned in the Settlement Proposal or related documents. The UN regarded Koevoet as a paramilitary unit which ought to be disbanded but the unit continued to deploy in the north in armoured and heavily armed convoys. In June 1989, the Special Representative told the Administrator-General that this behavior was totally inconsistent with the settlement proposal, which required the police to be lightly armed. Moreover, the vast majority of the Koevoet personnel were quite unsuited for continued employment in the South West African Police (SWAPOL). The Security Council, in its resolution of 29 August, therefore demanded the disbanding of Koevoet and dismantling of its command structures. South African foreign minister, Pik Botha, announced on 28 September 1989 that 1,200 ex-Koevoet members would be demobilized with effect from the following day. A further 400 such personnel were demobilized on 30 October. These demobilizations were supervised by UNTAG military monitors.

The 11-month transition period ended relatively smoothly. Political prisoners were granted amnesty, discriminatory legislation was repealed, South Africa withdrew all its forces from Namibia, and some 42,000 refugees returned safely and voluntarily under the auspices of the Office of the UN High Commissioner for Refugees (UNHCR). Almost 98% of registered voters turned out to elect members of the Constituent Assembly. The elections were held in November 1989, overseen by foreign observers, and were certified as free and fair by the UN Special Representative, with SWAPO taking 57% of the vote, just short of the two-thirds necessary to have a free hand in revising the framework constitution that had been formulated not by UN Commissioner Bernt Carlsson but by the South African appointee Louis Pienaar. The opposition Democratic Turnhalle Alliance received 29% of the vote. The Constituent Assembly held its first meeting on 21 November 1989 and resolved unanimously to use the 1982 Constitutional Principles in Namibia's new constitution.

=== Independence ===
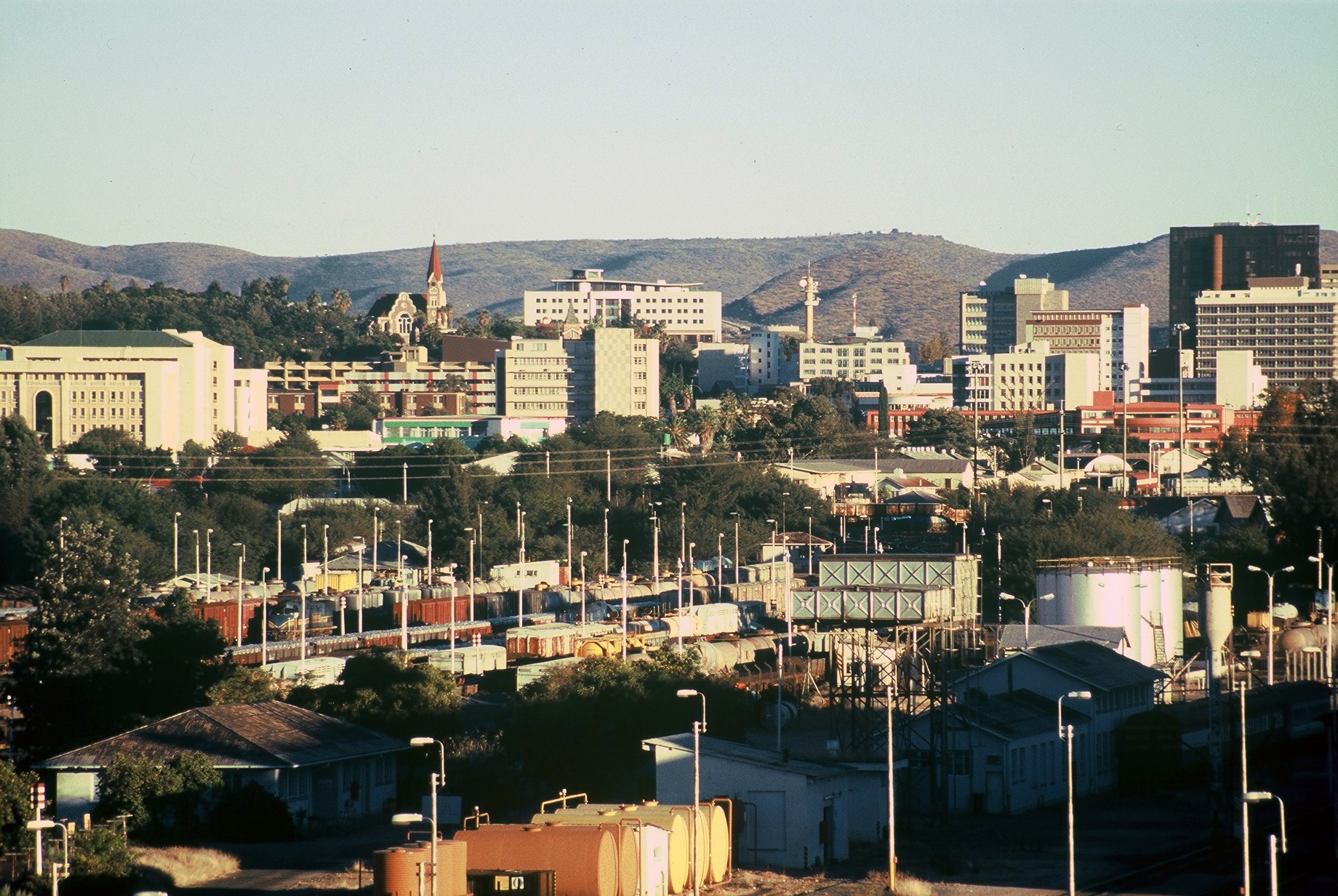
Windhoek skyline

By 9 February 1990, the Constituent Assembly had drafted and adopted a constitution. Independence Day on 21 March 1990, was attended by numerous international representatives, including the main players, the UN Secretary-General Javier Pérez de Cuéllar and President of South Africa F W de Klerk, who jointly conferred formal independence on Namibia. United States Secretary of State James Baker arrived to Namibia on 19 March to join the celebration marking Namibia's independence.

Sam Nujoma was sworn in as the first President of Namibia watched by Nelson Mandela (who had been released from prison shortly beforehand) and representatives from 147 countries, including 20 heads of state.

On 1 March 1994, the coastal enclave of Walvis Bay and 12 offshore islands were transferred to Namibia by South Africa. This followed three years of bilateral negotiations between the two governments and the establishment of a transitional Joint Administrative Authority (JAA) in November 1992 to administer the 780 km^{2} (300 sq mi) territory. The peaceful resolution of this territorial dispute was praised by the international community, as it fulfilled the provisions of the UNSCR 432 (1978), which declared Walvis Bay to be an integral part of Namibia.

== Independent Namibia ==
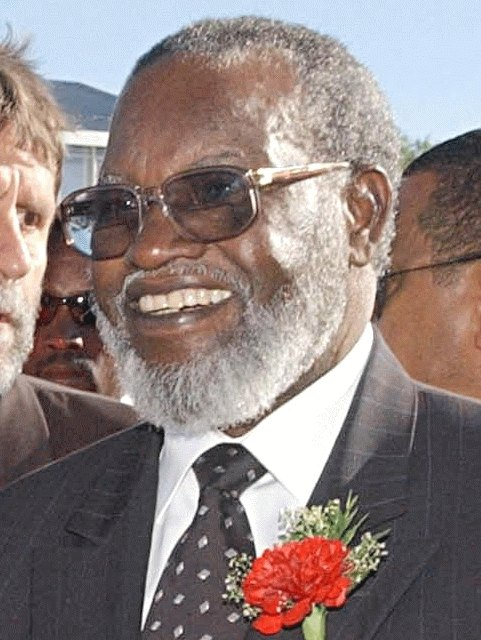
Namibia's founding president, Sam Nujoma.

Since independence Namibia has successfully completed the transition from white minority apartheid rule to a democratic society. Multiparty democracy was introduced and has been maintained, with local, regional and national elections held regularly. Several registered political parties are active and represented in the National Assembly, although SWAPO Party has won every election since independence. The transition from the 15-year rule of President Sam Nujoma to his successor, Hifikepunye Pohamba in 2005 went smoothly.

Namibian government has promoted a policy of national reconciliation and issued an amnesty for those who had fought on either side during the liberation war. The civil war in Angola had a limited impact on Namibians living in the north of the country. In 1998, Namibia Defence Force (NDF) troops were sent to the Democratic Republic of the Congo as part of a Southern African Development Community (SADC) contingent. In August 1999, a secessionist attempt in the northeastern Caprivi region was successfully quashed.

=== Re-election of Sam Nujoma ===
Sam Nujoma won the presidential elections of 1994 with 76.34% of the votes. There was only one other candidate, Mishake Muyongo of the DTA.

In 1998, with one year until the scheduled presidential election when Sam Nujoma would not be allowed to participate in since he had already served the two terms that the constitution allows, SWAPO amended the constitution, allowing three terms instead of two. They were able to do this since SWAPO had a two-thirds majority in both the National Assembly of Namibia and the National Council, which is the minimum needed to amend the constitution.

Sam Nujoma was reelected as president in 1999, winning the election, that had a 62.1% turnout with 76.82%. Second was Ben Ulenga from the Congress of Democrats (COD), that won 10.49% of the votes.

Ben Ulenga is a former SWAPO member and Deputy Minister of Environment and Tourism, and High Commissioner to the United Kingdom. He left SWAPO and became one of the founding members of COD in 1998, after clashing with his party on several questions. He did not approve of the amendment to the constitution, and criticised Namibia's involvement in Congo.

Nujoma was succeeded as President of Namibia by Hifikepunye Pohamba in 2005.

=== Land reform ===
One of SWAPO's policies, that had been formulated long before the party came into power, was land reform. Namibia's colonial and Apartheid past had resulted in a situation where about 20 percent of the population owned about 75 percent of all the land. Land was supposed to be redistributed mostly from the white minority to previously landless communities and ex-combatants. The land reform has been slow, mainly because Namibia's constitution only allows land to be bought from farmers willing to sell. Also, the price of land is very high in Namibia, which further complicates the matter. Squatting occurs when internal migrants move to the cities and live in informal settlements.

President Sam Nujoma has been vocal in his support of Zimbabwe and its president Robert Mugabe. During the land crisis in Zimbabwe, where the government confiscated white farmers' land by force, fears rose among the white minority and the western world that the same method would be used in Namibia.

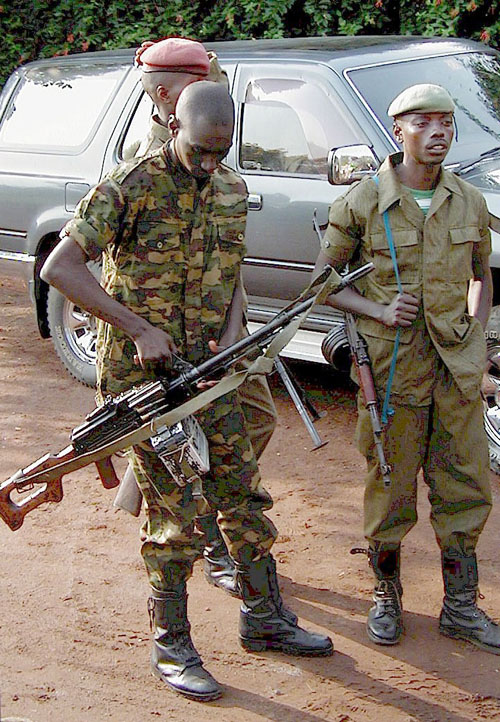
A Congolese rebel during the Second Congo War, 2001.

=== Involvement in conflicts in Angola and DRC ===
In 1999 Namibia signed a mutual defence pact with its northern neighbour Angola. This affected the Angolan Civil War that had been ongoing since Angola's independence in 1975. Both being leftist movements, SWAPO wanted to support the ruling party MPLA in Angola to fight the rebel movement UNITA, whose stronghold was in southern Angola. The defence pact allowed Angolan troops to use Namibian territory when attacking UNITA.

The Angolan civil war resulted in a large number of Angolan refugees coming to Namibia. At its peak in 2001 there were over 30,000 Angolan refugees in Namibia. The calmer situation in Angola has made it possible for many of them to return to their home with the help of UNHCR, and in 2004 only 12,600 remained in Namibia. Most of them reside in the refugee camp Osire north of Windhoek.

Namibia also intervened in the Second Congo War, sending troops in support of the Democratic Republic of Congo's president Laurent-Désiré Kabila.

=== The Caprivi conflict ===
The Caprivi conflict was an armed conflict between the Caprivi Liberation Army (CLA), a rebel group working for the secession of the Caprivi Strip, and the Namibian government. It started in 1994 and had its peak in the early hours of 2 August 1999 when CLA launched an attack in Katima Mulilo, the provincial capital of the Caprivi Region. Forces of the Namibian government struck back and arrested a number of alleged CLA supporters. The Caprivi conflict has led to the longest and largest trial in the history of Namibia, the Caprivi treason trial.

=== After Sam Nujoma (2005-present) ===
In March 2005, Namibia's founding president Sam Nujoma stepped down after 15 years in power. He was succeeded by Hifikepunye Pohamba.

In December 2014, Prime Minister Hage Geingob, the candidate of ruling SWAPO, won the presidential elections, taking 87% of the vote. His predecessor, President Hifikepunye Pohamba, also of Swapo, had served the maximum two terms allowed by the constitution. In December 2019, President Hage Geingob was re-elected for a second term, taking 56.3% of the vote.

On 4 February 2024, President Hage Geingob died and he was immediately succeeded by vice-president Nangolo Mbumba as new President of Namibia.

On 21 March 2025, Netumbo Nandi-Ndaitwah was sworn in as Namibia's first female president. She had won November's election with a 58% share of the vote as the candidate of the ruling South West Africa People's Organisation (Swapo).

== See also ==
- History of Africa
- History of Southern Africa
- Politics of Namibia
- List of presidents of Namibia
- Shark Island Concentration Camp
- Windhoek history and timeline
