= Prime Minister of Namibia =

Leader of the Government of Namibia

Prime Minister of the Republic of Namibia
- Coat of arms of Namibia

- Flag of Namibia

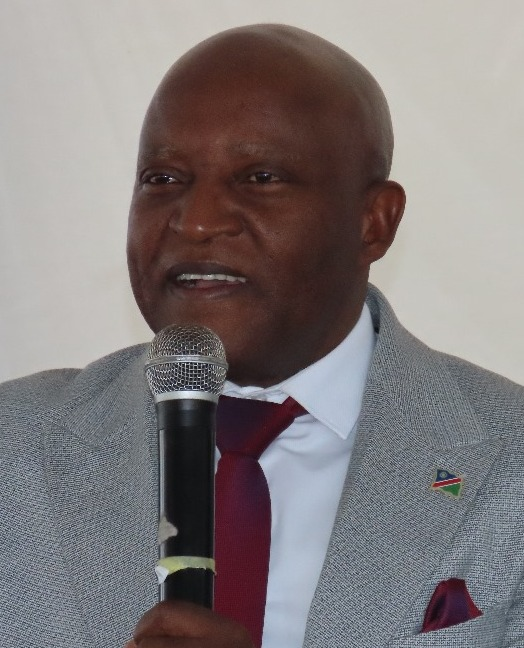
- Incumbent; Elijah Ngurare since 21 March 2025
- Residence: Old State House
- Appointer: President of Namibia
- Term length: 5 years
- Inaugural holder: Hage Geingob
- Formation: 21 March 1990; 36 years ago
- Deputy: Deputy Prime Minister of Namibia
- Salary: US$76,339 annually
- Website: https://opm.gov.na/

The prime minister of the Republic of Namibia is the leader of the Government of Namibia. The prime minister is appointed by the president and coordinates the work of the Cabinet. They also advise and assist the president in the execution of the functions of government.

== List of officeholders ==
Political parties

South West Africa People's Organization (SWAPO)

No.	Portrait	Name (Birth–Death)	Term of office			Political party	Elected	President(s)	Ref.
No.	Portrait	Name (Birth–Death)	Took office	Left office	Time in office	Political party	Elected	President(s)	Ref.
1		Hage Geingob (1941–2024)	21 March 1990	28 August 2002	12 years, 160 days	SWAPO	1989	Sam Nujoma	
1		Hage Geingob (1941–2024)	21 March 1990	28 August 2002	12 years, 160 days	SWAPO	1994	Sam Nujoma	
1		Hage Geingob (1941–2024)	21 March 1990	28 August 2002	12 years, 160 days	SWAPO	1999	Sam Nujoma	
2		Theo-Ben Gurirab (1938–2018)	28 August 2002	21 March 2005	2 years, 205 days	SWAPO	—	Sam Nujoma	
3		Nahas Angula (born 1943)	21 March 2005	4 December 2012	7 years, 258 days	SWAPO	2004	Hifikepunye Pohamba	
3		Nahas Angula (born 1943)	21 March 2005	4 December 2012	7 years, 258 days	SWAPO	2009	Hifikepunye Pohamba	
(1)		Hage Geingob (1941–2024)	4 December 2012	21 March 2015	2 years, 107 days	SWAPO	—	Hifikepunye Pohamba	
4		Saara Kuugongelwa-Amadhila (born 1967)	21 March 2015	21 March 2025	10 years	SWAPO	2014	Hage Geingob; Nangolo Mbumba	
4		Saara Kuugongelwa-Amadhila (born 1967)	21 March 2015	21 March 2025	10 years	SWAPO	2019	Hage Geingob; Nangolo Mbumba	
5		Elijah Ngurare (born 1970)	21 March 2025	Incumbent	1 year, 170 days	SWAPO	2024	Netumbo Nandi-Ndaitwah	

== See also ==
- Politics of Namibia
- List of colonial governors of South West Africa
- President of Namibia
- Vice President of Namibia
- Deputy Prime Minister of Namibia
- Cabinet of Namibia
