= President of Namibia =

Head of state and government

President of the Republic of Namibia
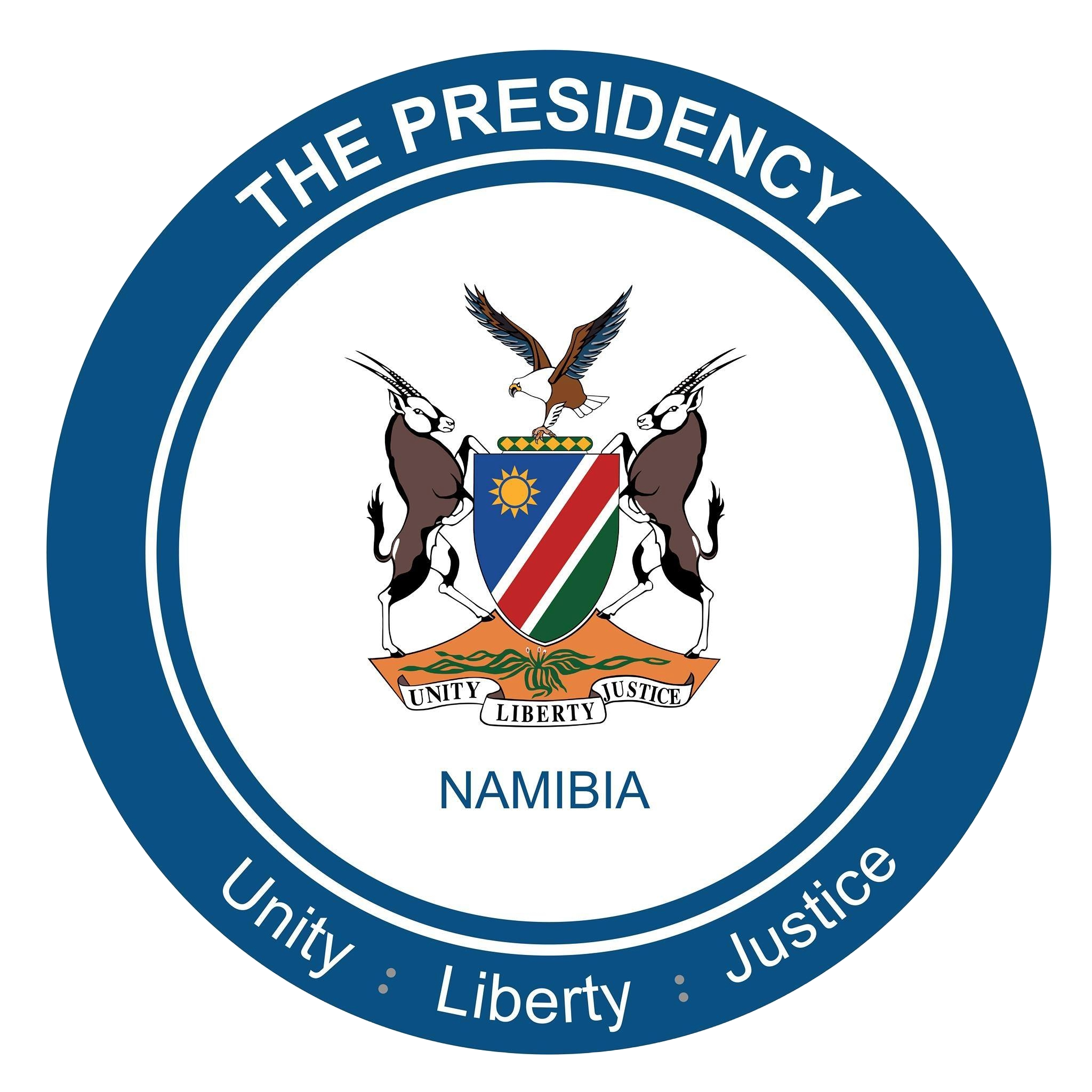
- Seal of the Presidency

- Presidential standard

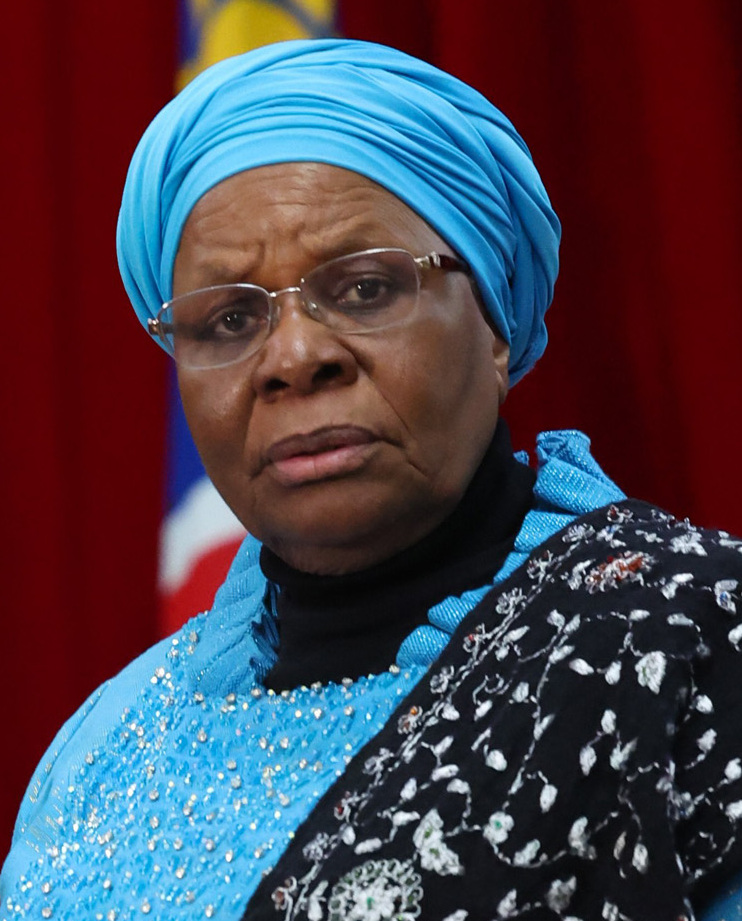
- Incumbent; Netumbo Nandi-Ndaitwah since 21 March 2025
- Style: His/Her Excellency
- Type: Head of state; Head of government; Commander-in-chief
- Residence: State House of Namibia
- Seat: Windhoek
- Term length: Five years, renewable once
- Constituting instrument: Constitution of Namibia
- Formation: 21 March 1990; 36 years ago
- First holder: Sam Nujoma
- Deputy: Vice President of Namibia
- Salary: N$1,753,964 (US$96,000) annually
- Website: www.op.gov.na

The president of Namibia is the head of state and head of government of Namibia. The president directs the executive branch of the government, acts as chair of the Cabinet and is the commander-in-chief of the armed forces in terms of the Constitution.

== Term limits ==
As of 2021, there is a two-term limit for the president in the Constitution of Namibia. The first president for whom the term limits applied was Hifikepunye Pohamba in 2015.

== Succession ==
If the presidency falls vacant and the president is unable to perform their duties, then the following officials are in line for succession for the remaining presidential term:

1. Vice President of Namibia
2. Prime Minister of Namibia
3. Deputy Prime Minister of Namibia
4. a person appointed by the Cabinet.

Before the constitution was amended in 2014 to add the office of vice president, the prime minister was first in the line of succession.

== List of officeholders ==
Political parties

South West Africa People's Organization (SWAPO)

Status

Denotes acting president

No.	Portrait	Name (Birth–Death)	Term of office			Political party	Elected	Cabinet(s)	Ref.
No.	Portrait	Name (Birth–Death)	Took office	Left office	Time in office	Political party	Elected	Cabinet(s)	Ref.
1		Sam Nujoma (1929–2025)	21 March 1990	21 March 2005	15 years	SWAPO	1989	Nujoma I	
1		Sam Nujoma (1929–2025)	21 March 1990	21 March 2005	15 years	SWAPO	1994	Nujoma II	
1		Sam Nujoma (1929–2025)	21 March 1990	21 March 2005	15 years	SWAPO	1999	Nujoma III	
2		Hifikepunye Pohamba (born 1935)	21 March 2005	21 March 2015	10 years	SWAPO	2004	Pohamba I	
2		Hifikepunye Pohamba (born 1935)	21 March 2005	21 March 2015	10 years	SWAPO	2009	Pohamba II	
3		Hage Geingob (1941–2024)	21 March 2015	4 February 2024 #	8 years, 320 days	SWAPO	2014	Geingob I	
3		Hage Geingob (1941–2024)	21 March 2015	4 February 2024 #	8 years, 320 days	SWAPO	2019	Geingob II	
—		Nangolo Mbumba (born 1941)	25 January 2024	4 February 2024	10 days	SWAPO	—	Geingob II	
4		Nangolo Mbumba (born 1941)	4 February 2024	21 March 2025	1 year, 45 days	SWAPO	—	Geingob II	
5		Netumbo Nandi-Ndaitwah (born 1952)	21 March 2025	Incumbent	1 year, 178 days	SWAPO	2024	Nandi-Ndaitwah	

== Latest election ==
Candidate	Party	Votes	%
Netumbo Nandi-Ndaitwah	SWAPO	638,560	58.07
Panduleni Itula	Independent Patriots for Change	284,106	25.84
McHenry Venaani	Popular Democratic Movement	55,412	5.04
Bernadus Swartbooi	Landless People's Movement	51,160	4.65
Job Amupanda	Affirmative Repositioning	19,676	1.79
Hendrik Gaobaeb	United Democratic Front	12,604	1.15
Henk Mudge	Republican Party	8,988	0.82
Evilastus Kaaronda	SWANU	7,991	0.73
Ambrosius Kumbwa	All People's Party	5,197	0.47
Epafras Mukwiilongo	Namibian Economic Freedom Fighters	3,978	0.36
Festus Thomas	Body of Christ Party	3,641	0.33
Mike Kavekotora	Rally for Democracy and Progress	2,974	0.27
Erastus Shuumbwa	Action Democratic Movement Party	2,069	0.19
Sakaria Likuwa	United Namibians Party	2,013	0.18
Vaino Amuthenu	Congress of Democrats	1,213	0.11
Total		1,099,582	100.00
Valid votes		1,099,582	98.69
Invalid/blank votes		14,552	1.31
Total votes		1,114,134	100.00
Registered voters/turnout		1,449,569	76.86

== See also ==
- Politics of Namibia
- List of colonial governors of South West Africa
- Vice President of Namibia
- Prime Minister of Namibia
- Deputy Prime Minister of Namibia
- Cabinet of Namibia
