= List of acts of the Parliament of South Africa, 1990–1999 =

This is a list of acts of the Parliament of South Africa enacted in the years 1990 to 1999.

South African acts are uniquely identified by the year of passage and an act number within that year. Some acts have gone by more than one short title in the course of their existence; in such cases each title is listed with the years in which it applied.

== 1990 ==
Act no.	Short title
1	Part Appropriation Act, 1990
2	Additional Post Office Appropriation Act, 1990
3	Public Accountants' and Auditors' Amendment Act, 1990
4	Transport Services Additional Appropriation Act, 1990
5	Alexander Bay Development Corporation Amendment Act, 1990
6	Additional Appropriation Act, 1990
7	Part Appropriation Act (House of Representatives), 1990
8	Part Appropriation Act (House of Assembly), 1990
9	Prevention and Combating of Pollution of the Sea by Oil Amendment Act, 1990
10	Associated Health Service Professions Amendment Act, 1990
11	Part Appropriation Act (House of Delegates), 1990
12	Reciprocal Service of Civil Process Act, 1990
13	Attorneys Amendment Act, 1990
14	Small Claims Courts Amendment Act, 1990
15	Trade Metrology Amendment Act, 1990
16	Small Business Development Amendment Act, 1990
17	Close Corporations Amendment Act, 1990
18	Companies Amendment Act, 1990
19	Additional Appropriation Act (House of Assembly), 1990
20	Additional Appropriation Act (House of Representatives), 1990
21	Additional Appropriation Act (House of Delegates), 1990
22	Post Office Appropriation Act, 1990
23	National Parks Amendment Act, 1990
24	Radio Amendment Act, 1990
25	Security Officers Amendment Act, 1990
26	Remuneration of Town Clerks Amendment Act, 1990
27	Maintenance of Surviving Spouses Act, 1990
28	Stock Theft Amendment Act, 1990
29	Dangerous Weapons Amendment Act, 1990
30	Arms and Ammunition Amendment Act, 1990
31	Development Trust and Land Second Amendment Act, 1990
32	Municipal Ordinance Amendment Act (Cape) (House of Assembly), 1990
33	Local Government Ordinance Amendment Act (O.F.S.) (House of Assembly), 1990
34	Recognition of the Independence of Namibia Act, 1990
35	Indemnity Act, 1990
36	Rand Water Board Statutes (Private) Act Amendment Act, 1990
37	Town and Regional Planners Amendment Act, 1990
38	Roodepoort and Weltevreden Agricultural Settlements Adjustment Amendment Act, 1990
39	Manpower Training Amendment Act, 1990
40	Workmen's Compensation Amendment Act, 1990
41	Universities and Technikons (Education and Training) Amendment Act, 1990
42	Education and Training Amendment Act, 1990
43	Harmful Business Practices Amendment Act, 1990
44	Import and Export Control Amendment Act, 1990
45	Inquests Amendment Act, 1990
46	Natural Scientists' Amendment Act, 1990
47	University of Stellenbosch (Private) Amendment Act (House of Assembly), 1990
48	Validation of Certain By-Laws Act (House of Assembly), 1990
49	Divisional Councils Ordinance Amendment Act (Cape) (House of Assembly), 1990
50	Local Government (Administration and Elections) Ordinance Amendment Act (Transvaal) (House of Assembly), 1990
51	Local Councils Amendment Act (House of Assembly), 1990
52	Local Government Ordinance Amendment Act (Transvaal) (House of Assembly), 1990
53	Local Authorities Rating Ordinance Amendment Act (Transvaal) (House of Assembly), 1990
54	Local Authorities Capital Development Fund Ordinance Amendment Act (Transvaal) (House of Assembly), 1990
55	Land Use Planning Ordinance Amendment Act (Cape) (House of Assembly), 1990
56	Dog Tax Ordinance Amendment Act (Cape) (House of Assembly), 1990
57	Appropriation Act (House of Assembly), 1990
58	Appropriation Act (House of Delegates), 1990
59	Customs and Excise Amendment Act, 1990
60	Private Schools Amendment Act (House of Assembly), 1990
61	Constitution Amendment Act, 1990
62	Transnet Pension Fund Act, 1990
63	Administration of Estates Amendment Act, 1990
64	Financial Institutions Amendment Act, 1990
65	Reinsurance of Material Damage and Losses Amendment Act, 1990
66	Auditor-General Amendment Act, 1990
67	Usury Amendment Act, 1990
68	Water Amendment Act, 1990
69	Companies Second Amendment Act, 1990
70	Housing Development Schemes for Retired Persons Amendment Act, 1990
71	Scientific Research Council Amendment Act, 1990
72	Development Trust and Land Amendment Act, 1990
73	Excision of Released Areas Amendment Act, 1990
74	South African Citizenship at Attainment of Independence by Namibia Regulation Act, 1990
75	Research Development Act, 1990
76	Land Survey Amendment Act, 1990
77	Urban Transport Amendment Act, 1990
78	Abuse of Dependence-producing Substances and Rehabilitation Centres Amendment Act, 1990
79	Medical, Dental and Supplementary Health Service Professions Amendment Act, 1990
80	Prevention of Illegal Squatting Amendment Act, 1990
81	Abolition of Development Bodies Amendment Act, 1990
82	Civil Defence Amendment Act, 1990
83	Fire Brigade Services Amendment Act, 1990
84	KwaZulu and Natal Joint Services Act, 1990
85	Livestock Improvement Amendment Act, 1990
86	Agricultural Research Act, 1990
87	Wine and Spirit Control Amendment Act, 1990
88	Maintenance and Promotion of Competition Amendment Act, 1990
89	Taxation Laws Amendment Act, 1990
90	Mier Rural Area Act (House of Representatives), 1990
91	Housing and Development Amendment Act (House of Representatives), 1990
92	Prisons Amendment Act, 1990
93	Appropriation Act, 1990
94	Deposit-taking Institutions Act, 1990 (before 1993); Banks Act, 1990 (after 1993)
95	Extension of the Powers of the South African Reserve Bank Act, 1990
96	Mutual Building Societies Amendment Act, 1990
97	Financial Services Board Act, 1990
98	Sea Fishery Amendment Act, 1990
99	Human Sciences Research Amendment Act, 1990
100	Discriminatory Legislation regarding Public Amenities Repeal Act, 1990
101	Income Tax Act, 1990
102	Correspondence Colleges Amendment Act (House of Assembly), 1990
103	Appropriation Act (House of Representatives), 1990
104	Local Government Ordinance Second Amendment Act (Orange Free State) (House of Assembly), 1990
105	Extension of the Public Resorts Ordinance Act (Transvaal) (House of Assembly), 1990
106	University of Pretoria (Private) Act (House of Assembly), 1990
107	Criminal Law Amendment Act, 1990
108	Mentally Ill Persons' Legal Interests Amendment Act, 1990
109	Finance Act, 1990
110	Police Amendment Act, 1990
111	National States Constitution Amendment Act, 1990
112	Application of Certain Laws to Namibia Abolition Act, 1990
113	Broadcasting Amendment Act, 1990
114	Engineering Profession of South Africa Act, 1990
115	Air Services Licensing Act, 1990
116	National Policy for Health Act, 1990
117	Pension Laws Amendment Act, 1990
118	Pensions (Supplementary) Act, 1990
119	Agricultural Product Standards Act, 1990
120	Public Service Laws Amendment Act, 1990
121	Rural Areas Amendment Act (House of Representatives), 1990

== 1991 ==
Act no.	Short title
1	Legal Aid Amendment Act, 1991
2	Maintenance Amendment Act, 1991
3	Sheriffs Amendment Act, 1991
4	Judicial Matters Amendment Act, 1991
5	Criminal Procedure Amendment Act, 1991
6	Insolvency Amendment Act, 1991
7	Protection of Animals Amendment Act, 1991
8	Inquests Amendment Act, 1991
9	Labour Relations Amendment Act, 1991
10	Diamonds Amendment Act, 1991
11	Alexander Bay Development Corporation Amendment Act, 1991
12	Mining Rights Amendment Act, 1991
13	Mines and Works Amendment Act, 1991
14	Mining Titles Registration Amendment Act, 1991
15	Eskom Amendment Act, 1991
16	Water Amendment Act, 1991
17	Plant Improvement Amendment Act, 1991
18	Animal Diseases Amendment Act, 1991
19	Roodepoort and Weltevreden Agricultural Settlements Adjustment Amendment Act, 1991
20	Nuclear Energy Amendment Act, 1991
21	Identification Amendment Act, 1991
22	"Woordeboek van die Afrikaanse Taal" Amendment Act, 1991
23	National Libraries Amendment Act, 1991
24	Universities and Technikons Advisory Council Amendment Act, 1991
25	National Monuments Amendment Act, 1991
26	Additional Appropriation Act, 1991
27	Part Appropriation Act, 1991
28	Part Appropriation Act (House of Assembly), 1991
29	Part Appropriation Act (House of Representatives), 1991
30	Part Appropriation Act (House of Delegates), 1991
31	Additional Appropriation Act (House of Assembly), 1991
32	Additional Appropriation Act (House of Representatives), 1991
33	Additional Appropriation Act (House of Delegates), 1991
34	Unauthorized Expenditure Act (House of Delegates), 1991
35	Post Office Appropriation Act, 1991
36	Transvaal Board for the Development of Peri-Urban Areas Ordinance Amendment Act (Transvaal) (House of Assembly), 1991
37	Local Authorities Capital Development Fund Ordinance Amendment Act (Transvaal) (House of Assembly), 1991
38	Local Government (Administration and Elections) Ordinance Amendment Act (Transvaal) (House of Assembly), 1991
39	Town-planning and Townships Ordinance Amendment Act (Transvaal) (House of Assembly), 1991
40	Suid-Afrikaanse Akademie vir Wetenskap en Kuns Amendment Act (House of Assembly), 1991
41	Unauthorized Expenditure Act (House of Representatives), 1991
42	Local Authorities Rating Ordinance Amendment Act (Transvaal) (House of Assembly), 1991
43	Local Government Ordinance Amendment Act (Orange Free State) (House of Assembly), 1991
44	Finance Act (House of Assembly), 1991
45	Local Government Affairs Council Amendment Act (House of Assembly), 1991
46	Municipal Ordinance Amendment Act (Cape) (House of Assembly), 1991
47	Land Use Planning Ordinance Amendment Act (Cape) (House of Assembly), 1991
48	Local Government Ordinance Amendment Act (Transvaal) (House of Assembly), 1991
49	Townships Ordinance Amendment Act (Orange Free State) (House of Assembly), 1991
50	Minerals Act, 1991
51	Transfer of Powers and Duties of the State President Act, 1991
52	Transnet Limited Amendment Act, 1991
53	Forest Amendment Act, 1991
54	Financial Institutions Amendment Act, 1991
55	Police Amendment Act, 1991
56	Application of Certain Laws to Namibia Abolition Act, 1991
57	Public Service Amendment Act, 1991
58	South African Medical Research Council Act, 1991
59	Provincial Matters Amendment Act, 1991
60	Pension Benefits for Councillors of Local Authorities Amendment Act, 1991
61	Lekoa City Council Dissolution Act, 1991
62	Financial Relations Amendment Act, 1991
63	Sectional Titles Amendment Act, 1991
64	Harmful Business Practices Amendment Act, 1991
65	Trade Marks Amendment Act, 1991
66	Housing Development Schemes for Retired Persons Amendment Act, 1991
67	National Road Safety Amendment Act, 1991
68	Petroleum Products Amendment Act, 1991
69	Registration of Services-type Uniforms Act Repeal Act, 1991
70	South African Citizenship Amendment Act, 1991
71	Businesses Act, 1991
72	Exemption from Certain Payments at the Transfer of the Sorghum Beer Industry Act, 1991
73	Road Traffic Amendment Act, 1991
74	Joint Executive Authority for KwaZulu and Natal Amendment Act, 1991
75	Regional Services Councils Amendment Act, 1991
76	Local Government Training Amendment Act, 1991
77	Black Communities Development Amendment Act, 1991
78	University of the Witwatersrand, Johannesburg, (Private) Amendment Act (House of Assembly), 1991
79	Arms and Ammunition Amendment Act, 1991
80	Public Accountants' and Auditors' Act, 1991
81	Deposit-taking Institutions Amendment Act, 1991
82	Municipal Consolidated Loans Fund Ordinance Amendment Act (Transvaal) (House of Assembly), 1991
83	Local Government Ordinance Second Amendment Act (Orange Free State) (House of Assembly), 1991
84	Removal of Restrictions Amendment Act (House of Assembly), 1991
85	Post Office Amendment Act, 1991
86	Child Care Amendment Act, 1991
87	Police Second Amendment Act, 1991
88	Education Affairs Amendment Act (House of Assembly), 1991
89	Value-Added Tax Act, 1991
90	National Education Policy Amendment Act (House of Assembly), 1991
91	Appropriation Act (House of Assembly), 1991
92	Appropriation Act (House of Representatives), 1991
93	Appropriation Act (House of Delegates), 1991
94	Medicines and Related Substances Control Amendment Act, 1991
95	Abolition of the National Energy Council Act, 1991
96	Aliens Control Act, 1991
97	Machinery and Occupational Safety Amendment Act, 1991
98	Environment Conservation Amendment Act, 1991
99	Radio Amendment Act, 1991
100	Education and Training Amendment Act, 1991
101	Adjustment of Fines Act, 1991
102	Attorneys Amendment Act, 1991
103	Short Process Courts and Mediation in Certain Civil Cases Act, 1991
104	Advocate-General Amendment Act, 1991
105	Game Theft Act, 1991
106	Admission of Advocates Amendment Act, 1991
107	Decriminalization Act, 1991
108	Abolition of Racially Based Land Measures Act, 1991
109	Promotion of Local Government Affairs Amendment Act, 1991
110	Transnet Limited Second Amendment Act, 1991
111	Customs and Excise Amendment Act, 1991
112	Upgrading of Land Tenure Rights Act, 1991
113	Less Formal Township Establishment Act, 1991
114	Population Registration Act Repeal Act, 1991
115	Fund-raising Amendment Act, 1991
116	Probation Services Act, 1991
117	Investigation of Serious Economic Offences Act, 1991
118	Magistrates' Courts Amendment Act, 1991
119	Financial Institutions Second Amendment Act, 1991
120	Finance Act, 1991
121	Mediation in Certain Divorce Matters Amendment Act, 1991
122	Correctional Services and Supervision Matters Amendment Act, 1991
123	Universities Amendment Act, 1991
124	Coal Act Repeal Act, 1991
125	Physical Planning Act, 1991
126	Development Aid Laws Amendment Act, 1991
127	Local Authority Affairs Amendment Act, 1991
128	Interim Measures for Local Government Act, 1991
129	Income Tax Act, 1991
130	Divisional Councils Ordinance Amendment Act (Cape) (House of Assembly), 1991
131	Municipal Ordinance Second Amendment Act (Cape) (House of Assembly), 1991
132	Appropriation Act, 1991
133	Pensions (Supplementary) Act, 1991
134	Boxing and Wrestling Control Amendment Act, 1991
135	Criminal Law Amendment Act, 1991
136	Taxation Laws Amendment Act, 1991
137	Occupational Diseases in Mines and Works Amendment Act, 1991
138	Internal Security and Intimidation Amendment Act, 1991
139	Prevention of Public Violence and Intimidation Act, 1991

== 1992 ==
Act no.	Short title
1	Estate Affairs Amendment Act, 1992
2	Small Claims Courts Amendment Act, 1992
3	Domicile Act, 1992
4	Criminal Law Amendment Act, 1992
5	Computer Evidence Amendment Act, 1992
6	Coal Resources Act Repeal Act, 1992
7	Sectional Titles Amendment Act, 1992
8	Commonwealth War Graves Act, 1992
9	Agricultural Pests Amendment Act, 1992
10	Livestock Brands Amendment Act, 1992
11	Marketing Amendment Act, 1992
12	Agricultural Produce Agents Act, 1992
13	Gatherings and Demonstrations Amendment Act, 1992
14	Urban Transport Amendment Act, 1992
15	Air Services Licensing Amendment Act, 1992
16	Aviation Amendment Act, 1992
17	Road Traffic Amendment Act, 1992
18	Merchant Shipping Amendment Act, 1992
19	Mental Health Amendment Act, 1992
20	Prevention and Treatment of Drug Dependency Act, 1992
21	Nursing Amendment Act, 1992
22	Multilateral Motor Vehicle Accidents Fund Amendment Act, 1992
23	Police Amendment Act, 1992
24	Additional Appropriation Act (House of Assembly), 1992
25	Additional Appropriation Act (House of Representatives), 1992
26	Additional Appropriation Act (House of Delegates), 1992
27	Part Appropriation Act, 1992
28	Additional Appropriation Act, 1992
29	Central Energy Fund Amendment Act, 1992
30	Part Appropriation Act (House of Assembly), 1992
31	Part Appropriation Act (House of Representatives), 1992
32	Part Appropriation Act (House of Delegates), 1992
33	Cultural Institutions Amendment Act (House of Assembly), 1992
34	Correspondence Colleges Amendment Act (House of Assembly), 1992
35	Local Government Ordinance Amendment Act (Transvaal) (House of Assembly), 1992
36	Division of Land Ordinance Amendment Act (Transvaal) (House of Assembly), 1992
37	Local Government Affairs Council Amendment Act (House of Assembly), 1992
38	Delegation of Powers Ordinance Amendment Act (Orange Free State) (House of Assembly), 1992
39	Education Affairs Amendment Act (House of Assembly), 1992
40	Road Traffic Second Amendment Act, 1992
41	Financial Services Board Amendment Act, 1992
42	Deposit-taking Institutions Amendment Act, 1992
43	Law of Succession Amendment Act, 1992
44	Divorce Amendment Act, 1992
45	Expropriation Amendment Act, 1992
46	Armaments Development and Production Amendment Act, 1992
47	Legal Succession to the South African Transport Services Amendment Act, 1992
48	Post Office Appropriation Act, 1992
49	Validation of Unauthorized Expenditure Act, 1992
50	Prevention of Public Violence and Intimidation Amendment Act, 1992
51	Births and Deaths Registration Act, 1992
52	National Parks Amendment Act, 1992
53	Hazardous Substances Amendment Act, 1992
54	Conversion of the Tweefontein Timber Company Limited Act, 1992
55	Education and Training Amendment Act, 1992
56	Diplomatic Immunities and Privileges Amendment Act, 1992
57	Sea Fishery Amendment Act, 1992
58	Medical, Dental and Supplementary Health Service Professions Amendment Act, 1992
59	Social Assistance Act, 1992
60	Board of Trade and Industry Amendment Act, 1992
61	Customs and Excise Amendment Act, 1992
62	Development and Housing Amendment Act (House of Assembly), 1992
63	Townships Ordinance Amendment Act (Orange Free State) (House of Assembly), 1992
64	Land Use Planning Ordinance Amendment Act (Cape) (House of Assembly), 1992
65	Local Government Ordinance Amendment Act (Orange Free State) (House of Assembly), 1992
66	Divisional Councils Ordinance Amendment Act (Cape) (House of Assembly), 1992
67	Education Ordinances Amendment Act (House of Assembly), 1992
68	University of the Orange Free State (Private) Amendment Act (House of Assembly), 1992
69	University of Port Elizabeth (Private) Amendment Act (House of Assembly), 1992
70	Unauthorized Expenditure Act (House of Delegates), 1992
71	Sugar Amendment Act, 1992
72	Appropriation Act (House of Assembly), 1992
73	Appropriation Act (House of Representatives), 1992
74	Appropriation Act (House of Delegates), 1992
75	Unauthorized Expenditure Act (House of Assembly), 1992
76	Public Investment Commissioners Amendment Act, 1992
77	Profession of Town Clerks Amendment Act, 1992
78	Finance Acts Consolidation Act, 1992
79	Environment Conservation Amendment Act, 1992
80	Correctional Services Amendment Act, 1992
81	Close Corporations Amendment Act, 1992
82	Companies Amendment Act, 1992
83	Financial Institutions Amendment Act, 1992
84	Financial Services Board Second Amendment Act, 1992
85	Safe Deposit of Securities Act, 1992 (before 1998); Custody and Administration of Securities Act, 1992 (after 1998)
86	Transport General Amendment Act, 1992
87	Admiralty Jurisdiction Regulation Amendment Act, 1992
88	Payment of Members of Parliament Amendment Act, 1992
89	South African Certification Council Amendment Act, 1992
90	Publications Amendment Act, 1992
91	National Parks Second Amendment Act, 1992
92	Attorney-General Act, 1992
93	Reporting by Public Entities Act, 1992
94	Corruption Act, 1992
95	Appropriation Act, 1992
96	Part Appropriation Acts Abolition Act, 1992
97	Referendums Amendment Act, 1992
98	Powers and Privileges of Parliament Amendment Act, 1992
99	International Air Services Amendment Act, 1992
100	National Roads Amendment Act, 1992
101	Posts and Telecommunications Acts Amendment Act, 1992
102	Prohibition of the Exhibition of Films on Sundays and Public Holidays Amendment Act, 1992
103	Gatherings and Demonstrations in or near the Union Buildings Act, 1992
104	Basic Conditions of Employment Amendment Act, 1992
105	Customs and Excise Second Amendment Act, 1992
106	Education and Training Second Amendment Act, 1992
107	University of Stellenbosch (Private) Act (House of Assembly), 1992
108	Potchefstroomse Universiteit vir Christelike Hoër Onderwys (Private) Amendment Act (House of Assembly), 1992
109	Local Government Ordinance Second Amendment Act (Transvaal) (House of Assembly), 1992
110	Local Government Ordinance Second Amendment Act (Orange Free State) (House of Assembly), 1992
111	Hospitals Ordinance Amendment Act (Transvaal) (House of Assembly), 1992
112	Coloured Persons Education Amendment Act (House of Representatives), 1992
113	Coloured Persons Education Second Amendment Act (House of Representatives), 1992
114	Indians Education Amendment Act (House of Delegates), 1992
115	Environment Conservation Second Amendment Act, 1992
116	Alexkor Limited Act, 1992
117	Arms and Ammunition Acts Amendment Act, 1992
118	Police Second Amendment Act, 1992
119	Security Officers Amendment Act, 1992
120	South African Abattoir Corporation Act, 1992
121	Abattoir Hygiene Act, 1992
122	Audit Arrangements Act, 1992
123	Auditor-General Amendment Act, 1992
124	Indemnity Amendment Act, 1992
125	Copyright Amendment Act, 1992
126	Criminal Law Second Amendment Act, 1992
127	Interception and Monitoring Prohibition Act, 1992
128	Management of State Forests Act, 1992
129	Electoral Amendment Act, 1992
130	Unemployment Insurance Amendment Act, 1992
131	Finance Act, 1992
132	Defence Amendment Act, 1992
133	Abolition of Racially Based Land Measures Amendment Act, 1992
134	Provincial and Local Authority Affairs Amendment Act, 1992
135	Internal Peace Institutions Act, 1992
136	Taxation Laws Amendment Act, 1992
137	Members of Parliament and Political Office-bearers Pension Scheme Amendment Act, 1992
138	Pensions (Supplementary) Act, 1992
139	General Law Amendment Act, 1992
140	Drugs and Drug Trafficking Act, 1992
141	Income Tax Act, 1992
142	Secret Services Account Amendment Act, 1992
143	Judicial Matters Amendment Act, 1992
144	Gambling Amendment Act, 1992
145	Inquests Amendment Act, 1992
146	Constitution Second Amendment Act, 1992
147	Joint Administration of Own Affairs Act, 1992
148	Filling of Casual Vacancies in Parliament Act, 1992
149	Constitution Amendment Act, 1992
150	University of the North Amendment Act, 1992
151	Further Indemnity Act, 1992

== 1993 ==
Act no.	Short title
1	Additional Appropriation Act, 1993
2	Registration of Newspapers Amendment Act, 1993
3	Aliens Control Amendment Act, 1993
4	Identification Amendment Act, 1993
5	Secret Services Amendment Act, 1993
6	Mutual Building Societies Amendment Act, 1993
7	Financial Institutions Amendment Act, 1993
8	Financial Supervision of the Multilateral Motor Vehicle Accidents Fund Act, 1993
9	Deposit-taking Institutions Amendment Act, 1993
10	South African Reserve Bank Amendment Act, 1993
11	Liquor Products Amendment Act, 1993
12	Agricultural Research Amendment Act, 1993
13	Veterinary and Para-Veterinary Professions Amendment Act, 1993
14	Deeds Registries Amendment Act, 1993
15	Sectional Titles Amendment Act, 1993
16	Police Amendment Act, 1993
17	Trade Metrology Amendment Act, 1993
18	General Law Amendment Act, 1993
19	Witpoort Adjustment Act, 1993
20	Liquid Fuel and Oil Act Repeal Act, 1993
21	Universities Amendment Act, 1993
22	Social Work Amendment Act, 1993
23	Medical Schemes Amendment Act, 1993
24	Additional Appropriation Act (House of Assembly), 1993
25	Additional Appropriation Act (House of Representatives), 1993
26	Additional Appropriation Act (House of Delegates), 1993
27	Transport Services Unappropriated Expenditure Act, 1993
28	Town and Regional Planners Amendment Act, 1993
29	Standards Act, 1993
30	Usury Amendment Act, 1993
31	Armaments Development and Production Amendment Act, 1993
32	Defence Amendment Act, 1993
33	Harmful Business Practices Amendment Act, 1993
34	Professional Land Surveyors' and Technical Surveyors' Amendment Act, 1993
35	Post Office Appropriation Act, 1993
36	Education Affairs Amendment Act (House of Assembly), 1993
37	Co-operatives Amendment Act, 1993
38	Marine Traffic Amendment Act, 1993
39	Road Traffic Amendment Act, 1993
40	Vista University Amendment Act, 1993
41	Local Authorities Loans Fund Amendment Act, 1993
42	Animal Matters Amendment Act, 1993
43	Imprint Act, 1993
44	Airports Company Act, 1993
45	Air Traffic and Navigation Services Company Act, 1993
46	Petroleum Products Amendment Act, 1993
47	Public Service Acts Amendment Act, 1993
48	Unauthorized Expenditure Act (House of Assembly), 1993
49	Unauthorized Expenditure Act (House of Delegates), 1993
50	Indians Education Amendment Act (House of Delegates), 1993
51	University of Durban-Westville Amendment Act (House of Delegates), 1993
52	Unauthorized Post Office Expenditure Act, 1993
53	Agricultural Credit Amendment Act (House of Assembly), 1993
54	University of South Africa (Private) Amendment Act (House of Assembly), 1993
55	Unauthorized Expenditure Act (House of Representatives), 1993
56	Local Government Affairs Amendment Act, 1993
57	Security by Means of Movable Property Act, 1993
58	Groot Constantia Trust Act, 1993
59	Convention on the International Recognition of Rights in Aircraft Act, 1993
60	International Air Services Act, 1993
61	Value-Added Tax Amendment Act, 1993
62	Documentary Evidence from Countries in Africa Act, 1993
63	Associated Health Service Professions Amendment Act, 1993
64	Potchefstroomse Universiteit vir Christelike Hoër Onderwys (Private) Amendment Act (House of Assembly), 1993
65	Arms and Ammunition Amendment Act, 1993
66	Road Traffic Second Amendment Act, 1993
67	Chartered Accountants Designation (Private) Act, 1993
68	Correctional Services Amendment Act, 1993
69	Exchequer Amendment Act, 1993
70	Public Accountants' and Auditors' Amendment Act, 1993
71	Price Control Amendment Act, 1993
72	Tourism Act, 1993
73	Broadcasting Amendment Act, 1993
74	Appropriation Act (House of Representatives), 1993
75	Appropriation Act (House of Delegates), 1993
76	Shortened Registration Procedures of Land Amendment Act (House of Representatives), 1993
77	Appropriation Act (House of Assembly), 1993
78	University of the Witwatersrand, Johannesburg, (Private) Amendment Act (House of Assembly), 1993
79	Finance Act (House of Assembly), 1993
80	Potchefstroomse Universiteit vir Christelike Hoër Onderwys (Private) Act (House of Assembly), 1993
81	University of the Orange Free State (Private) Amendment Act (House of Assembly), 1993
82	Constitution Amendment Act, 1993
83	Tobacco Products Control Act, 1993
84	Space Affairs Act, 1993
85	Occupational Health and Safety Act, 1993
86	Academic Health Centres Act, 1993
87	Non-Proliferation of Weapons of Mass Destruction Act, 1993
88	Boxing and Wrestling Control Amendment Act, 1993
89	Regional and Land Affairs General Amendment Act, 1993
90	Magistrates Act, 1993
91	Judges' Remuneration and Conditions of Employment Amendment Act, 1993
92	Water Amendment Act, 1993
93	Joint Administrative Authority for Walvis Bay Act, 1993
94	Environment Conservation Amendment Act, 1993
95	Security Forces Board of Inquiry Act, 1993
96	Appropriation Act, 1993
97	Taxation Laws Amendment Act, 1993
98	Customs and Excise Amendment Act, 1993
99	Joint Administration of Certain Matters Act, 1993
100	Geoscience Act, 1993
101	Housing Amendment Act, 1993
102	Public Service Labour Relations Act, 1993
103	Minerals Amendment Act, 1993
104	Financial Institutions Second Amendment Act, 1993
105	Liquor Amendment Act, 1993
106	Natural Scientific Professions Act, 1993
107	Revocation and Assignment of Powers of Self-governing Territories Act, 1993
108	General Law Second Amendment Act, 1993
109	Regulation of Joint Executive Action regarding Certain Land Act, 1993
110	Abolition of Racially Based Land Measures Amendment Act, 1993
111	Land Titles Adjustment Act, 1993
112	Rural Areas Amendment Act (House of Representatives), 1993
113	Income Tax Act, 1993
114	Recognition of Foreign Legal Qualifications and Practice Act, 1993
115	Attorneys Amendment Act, 1993
116	Criminal Matters Amendment Act, 1993
117	Local Government Affairs Second Amendment Act, 1993
118	Health and Welfare Matters Amendment Act, 1993
119	Distribution and Transfer of Certain State Land Act, 1993
120	Magistrates' Courts Amendment Act, 1993
121	Provision of Special Funds for Tertiary Education and Training Act, 1993
122	Insolvency Amendment Act, 1993
123	Finance Act, 1993
124	Mutual Banks Act, 1993
125	Technikons Act, 1993
126	Provision of Certain Land for Settlement Act, 1993
127	Overvaal Resorts Limited Act, 1993
128	Pensions (Supplementary) Act, 1993
129	General Law Third Amendment Act, 1993
130	Compensation for Occupational Injuries and Diseases Act, 1993
131	Nuclear Energy Act, 1993
132	General Law Fourth Amendment Act, 1993
133	Prevention of Family Violence Act, 1993
134	Defence Second Amendment Act, 1993
135	Correctional Services Second Amendment Act, 1993
136	Police Second Amendment Act, 1993
137	Basic Conditions of Employment Amendment Act, 1993
138	University of Cape Town (Private) Amendment Act (House of Assembly), 1993
139	Education Laws Amendment Act (House of Assembly), 1993
140	Revenue Laws Amendment Act, 1993
141	Policy Board for Financial Services and Regulation Act, 1993
142	Exchequer Second Amendment Act, 1993
143	National Emergency Telephone Service Act, 1993
144	Estate Agents Amendment Act, 1993
145	Nursing Amendment Act, 1993
146	Education Labour Relations Act, 1993
147	Agricultural Labour Act, 1993
148	Independent Media Commission Act, 1993
149	Internal Peace Institutions Amendment Act, 1993
150	Independent Electoral Commission Act, 1993
151	Transitional Executive Council Act, 1993
152	Self-governing Territories Constitution Amendment Act, 1993
153	Independent Broadcasting Authority Act, 1993
154	Pension and Other Benefits for Ministerial Representatives Act, 1993
155	Housing Arrangements Act, 1993
156	Dangerous Weapons Amendment Act, 1993
157	General Law Fifth Amendment Act, 1993
158	University of Pretoria (Private) Amendment Act (House of Assembly), 1993
159	Rhodes University (Private) Amendment Act (House of Assembly), 1993
160	Adjustments Appropriation Act (House of Assembly), 1993
161	Second Unauthorized Expenditure Act (House of Assembly), 1993
162	Education Affairs Second Amendment Act (House of Assembly), 1993
163	University of Natal (Private) Amendment Act (House of Assembly), 1993
164	Adjustments Appropriation Act (House of Representatives), 1993
165	Adjustments Estimate Act (House of Delegates), 1993
166	Second Unauthorized Expenditure Act (House of Delegates), 1993
167	Adjustments Appropriation Act, 1993
168	Income Tax Amendment Act, 1993
169	Societies for the Prevention of Cruelty to Animals Act, 1993
170	Regional and Land Affairs Second General Amendment Act, 1993
171	Post Office Amendment Act, 1993
172	Application of Resolutions of the Security Council of the United Nations Act, 1993
173	Correctional Services Third Amendment Act, 1993
174	Agricultural Research Second Amendment Act, 1993
175	Agricultural Development Fund Act, 1993
176	Post Office Second Amendment Act, 1993
177	Arms and Ammunition Second Amendment Act, 1993
178	Explosives Amendment Act, 1993
179	Public Services Amendment Act, 1993
180	Health and Welfare Matters Second Amendment Act, 1993
181	Occupational Health and Safety Amendment Act, 1993
182	Exchequer Third Amendment Act, 1993
183	Police Third Amendment Act, 1993
184	Second Finance Act, 1993
185	Certification Council for Technikon Education Amendment Act, 1993
186	Businesses Amendment Act, 1993
187	Regional Industrial Development Act, 1993 (before 1998); Manufacturing Development Act, 1993 (after 1998)
188	Marketing Amendment Act, 1993
189	Environment Conservation Second Amendment Act, 1993
190	Sea-shore Amendment Act, 1993
191	Housing Matters Amendment Act, 1993
192	Guardianship Act, 1993
193	Independent Electoral Commission Amendment Act, 1993
194	Trade Marks Act, 1993
195	Designs Act, 1993
196	Restoration and Extension of South African Citizenship Act, 1993
197	Closed Pension Fund Act, 1993
198	Development and Housing Amendment Act (House of Assembly), 1993
199	Housing Development Amendment Act (House of Delegates), 1993
200	Constitution of the Republic of South Africa, 1993
201	Constitution Consequential Amendments Act, 1993
202	Electoral Act, 1993
203	Transfer of Walvis Bay to Namibia Act, 1993
204	General Law Sixth Amendment Act, 1993
205	Regulation of Gatherings Act, 1993
206	Abolition of Restrictions on Free Political Activity Act, 1993
207	Castle Management Act, 1993
208	Occupational Diseases in Mines and Works Amendment Act, 1993
209	Local Government Transition Act, 1993
210	Lotteries and Gambling Board Act, 1993

== 1994 ==
Act no.	Short title
1	Electoral Amendment Act, 1994
2	Constitution of the Republic of South Africa Amendment Act, 1994
3	Constitution of the Republic of South Africa Second Amendment Act, 1994
The Constitution of the Republic of South Africa, 1993, came into force on 27 April 1994 with the election of the first non-racial Parliament on that date.
4	South African Passports and Travel Documents Act, 1994
5	Independent Electoral Commission Amendment Act, 1994
6	Payment of Members of Parliament Act, 1994
7	Reconstruction and Development Programme Fund Act, 1994
8	Housing Amendment Act, 1994
9	Judicial Service Commission Act, 1994
10	Judges' Remuneration and Conditions of Employment Amendment Act, 1994
11	Post Office Appropriation Act, 1994
12	Unauthorized Post Office Expenditure Act, 1994
13	Constitution of the Republic of South Africa Third Amendment Act, 1994
14	Constitution of the Republic of South Africa Fourth Amendment Act, 1994
15	Maritime Zones Act, 1994
16	Appropriation Act, 1994
17	Correctional Services Amendment Act, 1994
18	Imprint Amendment Act, 1994
19	Customs and Excise Amendment Act, 1994
20	Taxation Laws Amendment Act, 1994
21	Income Tax Act, 1994
22	Restitution of Land Rights Act, 1994
23	Public Protector Act, 1994
24	Constitution of the Republic of South Africa Sixth Amendment Act, 1994
25	Mutual Banks Amendment Act, 1994
26	Banks Amendment Act, 1994
27	National Roads General Amendment Act, 1994
28	Shipping and Civil Aviation Laws Rationalisation Act, 1994
29	Constitution of the Republic of South Africa Fifth Amendment Act, 1994
30	Volkstaat Council Act, 1994
31	Council of Traditional Leaders Act, 1994
32	Waters Laws Rationalisation and Amendment Act, 1994
33	Housing Second Amendment Act, 1994
34	Local Government Transition Act Amendment Act, 1994
35	National Economic, Development and Labour Council Act, 1994
36	Public Holidays Act, 1994
37	Commission on the Remuneration of Representatives Act, 1994
38	Intelligence Services Act, 1994
39	National Strategic Intelligence Act, 1994
40	Committee of Members of Parliament on and Inspectors-General of Intelligence Act, 1994 (before 1995); Intelligence Services Control Act, 1994 (from 1995 to 2003); Intelligence Services Oversight Act, 1994 (after 2003)
41	Finance Act, 1994
42	Trade Metrology Amendment Act, 1994
43	Fund-raising Amendment Act, 1994
44	Aged Persons Amendment Act, 1994
45	Social Assistance Amendment Act, 1994
46	Electricity Amendment Act, 1994
47	Mineral and Energy Laws Rationalisation Act, 1994
48	Central Energy Fund Amendment Act, 1994
49	Integration of Labour Laws Act, 1994
50	Agricultural Labour Amendment Act, 1994
51	Forestry Laws Rationalisation and Amendment Act, 1994
52	Environment Conservation Amendment Act, 1994
53	Remuneration and Allowances of Executive Deputy Presidents, Ministers and Deputy Ministers Act, 1994
54	Human Rights Commission Act, 1994
55	Admission of Advocates Amendment Act, 1994

The following proclamations issued by the President under section 237(3) of the Interim Constitution are regarded as having status equivalent to that of an Act of Parliament:

- Proclamation No. 103 of 1994: Public Service Act, 1994
- Proclamation No. 105 of 1994: Public Service Labour Relations Act, 1994
- Proclamation No. 138 of 1994: Educators' Employment Act, 1994

== 1995 ==
Act no.	Short title
1	Adjustments Appropriation Act, 1995
2	Land Administration Act, 1995
3	Town and Regional Planners Amendment Act, 1995
4	Additional Post Office Appropriate Act, 1995
5	Nursing Amendment Act, 1995
6	Pharmacy Amendment Act, 1995
7	Arms and Ammunition Amendment Act, 1995
8	Arms, Ammunition and Armament Laws Transitional Regulation Act, 1995
9	Industrial Development Amendment Act, 1995
10	Recognition of Foreign Legal Qualifications and Practice Amendment Act, 1995
11	Land Affairs General Amendment Act, 1995
12	Auditor-General Act, 1995
13	Constitutional Court Complementary Act, 1995
14	Periods of Office of Members of Councils for Architects, Engineers, Quantity Surveyors and Valuers Adjustment Act, 1995
15	South African Roads Board Amendment Act, 1995
16	Transport General Amendment Act, 1995
17	Post Office Appropriation Act, 1995
18	Medical, Dental and Supplementary Health Service Professions Amendment Act, 1995
19	Tax Amnesty Act, 1995
20	Constitution of the Republic of South Africa Amendment Act, 1995
21	Income Tax Act, 1995
22	Public Investment Commissioners Amendment Act, 1995
23	Public Accountants' and Auditors' Amendment Act, 1995
24	Land Bank Amendment Act, 1995
25	Local Authorities Loans Fund Amendment Act, 1995
26	Bophuthatswana National Provident Fund Amendment Act, 1995
27	Technikons Amendment Act, 1995
28	Internal Peace Institutions Act Repeal Act, 1995
29	Remuneration of Traditional Leaders, 1995
30	Labour Appeal Court Sitting as Special Tribunal Act, 1995
31	Committee of Members of Parliament on and Inspectors-General of Intelligence Amendment Act, 1995
32	Insolvency Amendment Act, 1995
33	Admission of Legal Practitioners Amendment Act, 1995
34	Promotion of National Unity and Reconciliation Act, 1995
35	Post Office Amendment Act, 1995
36	Independent Broadcasting Authority Amendment Act, 1995
37	Taxation Laws Amendment Act, 1995
38	National Parks Amendment Act, 1995
39	Board on Tariffs and Trade Amendment Act, 1995
40	Chiropractors, Homeopaths and Allied Health Service Professions Amendment Act, 1995
41	Home Affairs Laws Rationalisation Act, 1995
42	Appropriation Act, 1995
43	Legal Succession to the South African Transport Services Amendment Act, 1995
44	Constitution of the Republic of South Africa Second Amendment Act, 1995
45	Customs and Excise Amendment Act, 1995
46	Investigation of Serious Economic Offences Amendment Act, 1995
47	Identification Amendment Act, 1995
48	Public Holidays Amendment Act, 1995
49	National Building Regulations and Building Standards Act, 1995
50	Non-Proliferation of Weapons of Mass Destruction Amendment Act, 1995
51	Water Amendment Act, 1995
52	Social Work Amendment Act, 1995
53	Audit Matters Rationalisation and Amendment Act, 1995
54	Stock Exchange Control Amendment Act, 1995
55	Financial Markets Control Amendment Act, 1995
56	Independent Electoral Commission Amendment Act, 1995
57	Liquor Amendment Act, 1995
58	South African Qualifications Authority Act, 1995
59	Pan South African Language Board Act, 1995
60	Electricity Amendment Act, 1995
61	Local Government Transition Act Amendment Act, 1995
62	Right of Appearance in Courts Act, 1995
63	Forest Amendment Act, 1995
64	Space Affairs Amendment Act, 1995
65	Agricultural Credit Amendment Act, 1995
66	Labour Relations Act, 1995
67	Development Facilitation Act, 1995
68	South African Police Service Act, 1995
69	Eskom Amendment Act, 1995
70	Post Office Service Amendment Act, 1995
71	Defence Special Account Amendment Act, 1995
72	Defence Amendment Act, 1995
73	Dumping at Sea Control Amendment Act, 1995
74	Sea Fishery Amendment Act, 1995
75	Criminal Procedure Second Amendment Act, 1995
76	Aliens Control Amendment Act, 1995
77	Interception and Monitoring Prohibition Amendment Act, 1995
78	National Supplies Procurement Amendment Act, 1995
79	Credit Agreements Amendment Act, 1995
80	Sale and Service Matters Amendment Act, 1995
81	Usury Amendment Act, 1995
82	Transport Second General Amendment Act, 1995
83	Air Services Licensing Amendment Act, 1995
84	Restitution of Land Rights Amendment Act, 1995
85	Judicial Matters Amendment Act, 1995
86	State of Emergency Act, 1995
87	Promotion of National Unity and Reconciliation Amendment Act, 1995
88	South African Citizenship Act, 1995
89	Local Government Transition Act Second Amendment Act, 1995

== 1996 ==
Act no.	Short title
	Constitution of the Republic of South Africa, 1996
1	Adjustments Appropriation Act, 1996
2	South African Reserve Bank Amendment Act, 1996
3	Land Reform (Labour Tenants) Act, 1996
4	Independent Broadcasting Authority Amendment Act, 1996
5	Former States Posts and Telecommunications Reorganisation Act, 1996
6	Housing Amendment Act, 1996
7	Constitution of the Republic of South Africa Amendment Act, 1996
8	Parliamentary and Provincial Medical Aid Scheme Amendment Act, 1996
9	Transport Advisory Council Abolition Act, 1996
10	International Air Services Amendment Act, 1996
11	Deeds Registries Amendment Act, 1996
12	Local Government Transition Act Amendment Act, 1996
13	Public Service Amendment Act, 1996
14	Correctional Services Amendment Act, 1996
15	Plant Breeders' Rights Amendment Act, 1996
16	Agricultural Research Amendment Act, 1996
17	University of North-West (Private) Act, 1996
18	Justice Laws Rationalisation Act, 1996
19	National Youth Commission Act, 1996
20	Legal Aid Amendment Act, 1996
21	Estate Agents Amendment Act, 1996
22	Pension Funds Amendment Act, 1996
23	Currency and Exchanges Amendment Act, 1996
24	National Roads Amendment Act, 1996
25	Plant Improvement Amendment Act, 1996
26	Constitution of the Republic of South Africa Third Amendment Act, 1996
27	National Education Policy Act, 1996
28	Communal Property Associations Act, 1996
29	Mine Health and Safety Act, 1996
30	Post Office Appropriation Act, 1996
31	Interim Protection of Informal Land Rights Act, 1996
32	Supervision of Financial Institutions Rationalisation Act, 1996
33	National Gambling Act, 1996
34	Upgrading of Land Tenure Rights Amendment Act, 1996
35	Magistrates Amendment Act, 1996
36	Income Tax Act, 1996
37	Taxation Laws Amendment Act, 1996
38	Tax on Retirement Funds Act, 1996
39	Commission on Gender Equality Act, 1996
40	Births and Deaths Registration Amendment Act, 1996
41	Appropriation Act, 1996
42	Labour Relations Amendment Act, 1996
43	National Archives of South Africa Act, 1996
44	Customs and Excise Amendment Act, 1996
45	Rationalisation of Corporate Laws Act, 1996
46	Revenue Laws Amendment Act, 1996
47	Marketing of Agricultural Products Act, 1996
48	Borrowing Powers of Provincial Governments Act, 1996
49	General Law Amendment Act, 1996
50	Broadcasting Amendment Act, 1996
51	Electoral Commission Act, 1996
52	Land Administration Amendment Act, 1996
53	Unit Trusts Control Amendment Act, 1996
54	Insurance Amendment Act, 1996
55	Banks Amendment Act, 1996
56	Road Accident Fund Act, 1996
57	Integration of Usury Laws Act, 1996
58	Trade Metrology Amendment Act, 1996
59	Non-Proliferation of Weapons of Mass Destruction Amendment Act, 1996
60	Antarctic Treaties Act, 1996
61	Remuneration of Town Clerks Act, Repeal Act, 1996
62	Profession of Town Clerks Act, Repeal Act, 1996
63	Sentech Act, 1996
64	Security Officers Amendment Act, 1996
65	Films and Publications Act, 1996
66	International Convention for the Prevention of Pollution from Ships Amendment Act, 1996
67	Public Service Second Amendment Act, 1996
68	Integration Measures in respect of Labour Laws, Amendment and Adjustments Act, 1996
69	Special Pensions Act, 1996
70	Safe Deposit of Securities Amendment Act, 1996
71	Stock Exchanges Control Amendment Act, 1996
72	Hague Convention on the Civil Aspects of International Child Abduction Act, 1996
73	Financial Markets Control Amendment Act, 1996
74	Special Investigating Units and Special Tribunals Act, 1996
75	International Co-operation in Criminal Matters Act, 1996
76	Proceeds of Crime Act, 1996
77	Extradition Amendment Act, 1996
78	Land Restitution and Reform Laws Amendment Act, 1996
79	Correctional Services Second Amendment Act, 1996
80	University of Zululand (Private) Amendment Act, 1996
81	University of Transkei (Private) Act, 1996
82	University of Durban-Westville (Private) Amendment Act, 1996
83	University of Port Elizabeth (Private) Amendment Act, 1996
84	South African Schools Act, 1996
85	Criminal Procedure Second Amendment Act, 1996
86	Criminal Procedure Amendment Act, 1996
87	Agriculture Laws Extension Act, 1996
88	Abolition of Restrictions on the Jurisdiction of Courts Act, 1996
89	University of Venda (Private) Act, 1996
90	Safety Matters Rationalisation Act, 1996
91	Former States Broadcasting Reorganisation Act, 1996
92	Choice on Termination of Pregnancy Act, 1996
93	National Road Traffic Act, 1996
94	Wreck and Salvage Act, 1996
95	Divorce Amendment Act, 1996
96	Child Care Amendment Act, 1996
97	Local Government Transition Act Second Amendment Act, 1996
98	Aviation Laws Amendment Act, 1996
99	Demobilisation Act, 1996
100	Environment Conservation Act Extension Act, 1996
101	Final Relief on Tax, Interest, Penalty and Additional Tax Act, 1996
102	National Small Enterprise Act, 1996
103	Telecommunications Act, 1996
104	Judicial Matters Amendment Act, 1996
105	Tourism Amendment Act, 1996
106	Welfare Laws Amendment Act, 1996
107	Intellectual Property Laws Rationalisation Act, 1996
108	Act number originally allocated to the Constitution

== 1997 ==
Act no.	Short title
The Constitution of the Republic of South Africa, 1996, came into force on 4 February 1997 but the existing Parliament continued without an election.
	Constitution of the Republic of South Africa Amendment Act, 1997 (before 2005); Constitution First Amendment Act of 1997 (after 2005)
1	Adjustments Appropriation Act, 1997
2	Post Office Appropriation Act, 1997
3	Exchequer Amendment Act, 1997
4	Defence Amendment Act, 1997
5	Public Accountants' and Auditors' Amendment Act, 1997
6	Finance Act, 1997
7	Prescribed Rate of Interest Amendment Act, 1997
8	Land Survey Act, 1997
9	KwaZulu-Natal Ingonyama Trust Amendment Act, 1997
10	Council of Traditional Leaders Act, 1997 (before 1998); National House of Traditional Leaders Act, 1997 (after 1998)
11	Post Office Amendment Act, 1997
12	Telecommunications Amendment Act, 1997
13	Development Bank of Southern Africa Act, 1997
14	South African Institute for Drug-Free Sport Act, 1997
15	Genetically Modified Organisms Act, 1997
16	Board on Tariffs and Trade Amendment Act, 1997
17	National Council of Provinces (Permanent Delegates Vacancies) Act, 1997
18	Promotion of National Unity and Reconciliation Amendment Act, 1997
19	Nursing Amendment Act, 1997
20	Electoral Amendment Act, 1997
21	University of the Witwatersrand, Johannesburg (Private) Amendment Act, 1997
22	Financial Institutions Amendment Act, 1997
23	Shipping General Amendment Act, 1997
24	Broadcasting Amendment Act, 1997
25	Medical University of Southern Africa (Private) Amendment Act, 1997
26	Close Corporations Amendment Act, 1997
27	Taxation Laws Amendment Act, 1997
28	Income Tax Act, 1997
29	Appropriation Act, 1997
30	Reporting by Public Entities Amendment Act, 1997
31	Insurance Amendment Act, 1997
32	University of Durban-Westville (Private) Amendment Act, 1997
33	Abolition of Corporal Punishment Act, 1997
34	South African Revenue Service Act, 1997
35	Act number originally assigned to the Constitution First Amendment Act
36	South African Olympic Hosting Act, 1997
37	Counterfeit Goods Act, 1997
38	Intellectual Property Laws Amendment Act, 1997
39	South African Reserve Bank Amendment Act, 1997
40	Unauthorised Post Office Expenditure Act, 1997
41	South African Police Service Amendment Act, 1997
42	Repeal of Local Government Laws Act, 1997
43	Dental Technicians Amendment Act, 1997
44	Sectional Titles Amendment Act, 1997
45	Extension of Terms of Office of Members of Certain Councils Act, 1997
46	Public Service Commission Act, 1997
47	Public Service Laws Amendment Act, 1997
48	Abolition of Public Administration Commissions Act, 1997
49	South African Passports and Travel Documents Amendment Act, 1997
50	Marriage Act, Extension Act, 1997
51	Environmental Laws Rationalisation Act, 1997
52	Organised Local Government Act, 1997
53	Post Office Second Amendment Act, 1997
54	Legal Deposit Act, 1997
55	National Advisory Council on Innovation Act, 1997
56	National Arts Council Act, 1997
57	Lotteries Act, 1997
58	Water Amendment Act, 1997
59	Marketing of Agricultural Products Amendment Act, 1997
60	Livestock Improvement Amendment Act, 1997
61	Compensation for Occupational Injuries and Diseases Amendment Act, 1997
62	Extension of Security of Tenure Act, 1997
63	Land Restitution and Reform Laws Amendment Act, 1997
64	State of Emergency Act, 1997
65	Divorce Courts Amendment Act, 1997
66	Contingency Fees Act, 1997
67	Births and Deaths Registration Amendment Act, 1997
68	Identification Act, 1997
69	South African Citizenship Amendment Act, 1997
70	National Parks Amendment Act, 1997
71	Nonprofit Organisations Act, 1997
72	Mine Health and Safety Amendment Act, 1997
73	National Film and Video Foundation Act, 1997
74	Overvaal Resorts Limited Amendment Act, 1997
75	Basic Conditions of Employment Act, 1997
76	Criminal Procedure Amendment Act, 1997
77	Judges' Remuneration and Conditions of Employment Amendment Act, 1997
78	Qualification of Legal Practitioners Amendment Act, 1997
79	Constitutional Court Complementary Act Amendment Act, 1997
80	Magistrates' Court Second Amendment Act, 1997
81	Magistrates' Court Amendment Act, 1997
82	Aviation Laws Amendment Act, 1997
83	Explosives Amendment Act, 1997
84	Promotion of National Unity and Reconciliation Second Amendment Act, 1997
85	Criminal Procedure Second Amendment Act, 1997
86	Natural Fathers of Children Born out of Wedlock Act, 1997
87	Parole and Correctional Supervision Amendment Act, 1997
88	Pharmacy Amendment Act, 1997
89	Medical, Dental and Supplementary Health Service Professions Amendment Act, 1997
90	Medicines and Related Substances Control Amendment Act, 1997
91	Chiropractors, Homeopaths and Allied Health Service Professions Amendment Act, 1997
92	Independent Commission for the Remuneration of Public Office-bearers Act, 1997
93	Public Service Laws Second Amendment Act, 1997
94	Pension Funds Amendment Act, 1997
95	Revenue Funds Interim Arrangements Act, 1997
96	Financial and Fiscal Commission 1993 Constitutional Provisions Repeal Act, 1997
97	Intergovernmental Fiscal Relations Act, 1997
98	Local Authorities Loans Funds Acts Repeal Act, 1997
99	Financial and Fiscal Commission Act, 1997
100	Education Laws Amendment Act, 1997
101	Higher Education Act, 1997
102	Correctional Services Amendment Act, 1997
103	Public Funding of Represented Political Parties Act, 1997
104	Security Officers Amendment Act, 1997
105	Criminal Law Amendment Act, 1997
106	Welfare Laws Amendment Act, 1997
107	Housing Act, 1997
108	Water Services Act, 1997

== 1998 ==
Act no.	Short title
	Constitution of the Republic of South Africa Amendment Act, 1998 (before 2005); Constitution Second Amendment Act of 1998 (after 2005)
	Constitution of the Republic of South Africa Second Amendment Act, 1998 (before 2005); Constitution Third Amendment Act of 1998 (after 2005)
1	Medical, Dental and Supplementary Health Service Professions Amendment Act, 1998
2	Airports Company Amendment Act, 1998
3	Adjustments Appropriation Act, 1998
4	Cross-Border Road Transport Act, 1998
5	South African Maritime Safety Authority Act, 1998
6	South African Maritime Safety Authority Levies Act, 1998
7	The South African National Roads Agency Limited and National Roads Act, 1998
8	National Road Traffic Amendment Act, 1998
9	Additional Post Office Appropriation Act, 1998
10	Department of Communications Rationalisation Act, 1998
11	Interim Appropriation Act, 1998
12	Unit Trusts Control Amendment Act, 1998
13	Financial Markets Control Amendment Act, 1998
14	Stock Exchanges Control Amendment Act, 1998
15	Regulation of Foreign Military Assistance Act, 1998
16	Economic Co-operation Promotion Loan Fund Amendment Act, 1998
17	Transfer of Staff to Municipalities Act, 1998
18	Marine Living Resources Act, 1998
19	Prevention of Illegal Eviction from and Unlawful Occupation of Land Act, 1998
20	Remuneration of Public Office Bearers Act, 1998
21	Land Bank Amendment Act, 1998
22	Regional Industrial Development Amendment Act, 1998
23	National Research Foundation Act, 1998
24	Measuring Units and National Measuring Standards Amendment Act, 1998
25	Wine and Spirit Control Amendment Act, 1998
26	Provision of Certain Land for Settlement Amendment Act, 1998
27	Local Government: Municipal Demarcation Act, 1998
28	Division of Revenue Act, 1998
29	Appropriation Act, 1998
30	Taxation Laws Amendment Act, 1998
31	Uncertificated Securities Tax Act, 1998
32	National Prosecuting Authority Act, 1998
33	Promotion of National Unity and Reconciliation Amendment Act, 1998
34	Judicial Matters Amendment Act, 1998
35	Companies Amendment Act, 1998
36	National Water Act, 1998
37	National Strategic Intelligence Amendment Act, 1998
38	Safe Deposit of Securities Amendment Act, 1998
39	Transport Appeal Tribunal Act, 1998
40	South African Civil Aviation Authority Act, 1998
41	South African Civil Aviation Authority Levies Act, 1998
42	South African Passports and Travel Documents Amendment Act, 1998
43	Births and Deaths Registration Amendment Act, 1998
44	Sterilisation Act, 1998
45	National Land Transport Interim Arrangement Act, 1998
46	Administrative Adjudication of Road Traffic Offences Act, 1998
47	Road Traffic Laws Rationalisation Act, 1998
48	KwaZulu Land Affairs Amendment Act, 1998
49	Insurance Amendment Act, 1998
50	Demutualisation Levy Act, 1998
51	Insurance Second Amendment Act, 1998
52	Long-term Insurance Act, 1998
53	Short-term Insurance Act, 1998
54	Inherited Debt Relief Act, 1998
55	Employment Equity Act, 1998
56	Adoption Matters Amendment Act, 1998
57	Shipping Laws Amendment Act, 1998
58	Ship Registration Act, 1998
59	Culture Promotion Amendment Act, 1998
60	Companies Second Amendment Act, 1998
61	Land Affairs General Amendment Act, 1998
62	Animal Improvement Act, 1998
63	Agricultural Product Standards Amendment Act, 1998
64	Subdivision of Agricultural Land Act Repeal Act, 1998
65	Act number originally assigned to the Constitution Second Amendment Act
66	Magistrates Amendment Act, 1998
67	Magistrates' Courts Amendment Act, 1998
68	Criminal Matters Amendment Act, 1998
69	Determination of Delegates (National Council of Provinces) Act, 1998
70	Road Transport Appeal Matters Amendment Act, 1998
71	Road Accident Fund Commission Act, 1998
72	Agricultural Laws Rationalisation Act, 1998
73	Electoral Act, 1998
74	Sheriffs Amendment Act, 1998
75	Special Pensions Amendment Act, 1998
76	Employment of Educators Act, 1998
77	Port of Ngqura Establishment Act, 1998
78	National Payment System Act, 1998
79	Reconstruction and Development Programme Fund Amendment Act, 1998
80	Inspection of Financial Institutions Act, 1998
81	Defence Special Tribunal Act, 1998
82	Executive Members' Ethics Act, 1998
83	South African Police Service Amendment Act, 1998
84	National Forests Act, 1998
85	Council of Traditional Leaders Amendment Act, 1998
86	Public Service Laws Amendment Act, 1998
87	Act number originally assigned to the Constitution Third Amendment Act
88	State Information Technology Agency Act, 1998
89	Competition Act, 1998
90	Estate Agents Amendment Act, 1998
91	The South African Library for the Blind Act, 1998
92	The National Library of South Africa Act, 1998
93	Deeds Registries Amendment Act, 1998
94	Transformation of Certain Rural Areas Act, 1998
95	Housing Consumers Protection Measures Act, 1998
96	Parliamentary Villages Management Board Act, 1998
97	Skills Development Act, 1998
98	Further Education and Training Act, 1998
99	Maintenance Act, 1998
100	Aged Persons Amendment Act, 1998
101	National Veld and Forest Fire Act, 1998
102	Social Work Amendment Act, 1998
103	Alienation of Land Amendment Act, 1998
104	No act by this number
105	National Empowerment Fund Act, 1998
106	National Parks Amendment Act, 1998
107	National Environmental Management Act, 1998
108	National Development Agency Act, 1998
109	South African Sports Commission Act, 1998
110	National Sport and Recreation Act, 1998
111	Correctional Services Act, 1998
112	Witness Protection Act, 1998
113	Public Protector Amendment Act, 1998
114	Debt Collectors Act, 1998
115	Attorneys and Matters relating to Rules of Court Amendment Act, 1998
116	Domestic Violence Act, 1998
117	Local Government: Municipal Structures Act, 1998
118	South African Geographical Names Council Act, 1998
119	Cultural Institutions Act, 1998
120	Recognition of Customary Marriages Act, 1998
121	Prevention of Organised Crime Act, 1998
122	Judicial Matters Second Amendment Act, 1998
123	No act by this number
124	Postal Services Act, 1998
125	Companies Third Amendment Act, 1998
126	Eskom Amendment Act, 1998
127	Labour Relations Amendment Act, 1998
128	Demobilisation Amendment Act, 1998
129	Second Adjustments Appropriation Act, 1998
130	Refugees Act, 1998
131	Medical Schemes Act, 1998
132	South African Medicines and Medical Devices Regulatory Authority Act, 1998
133	No act by this number
134	Conversion of SASRIA Act, 1998
135	Insider Trading Act, 1998
136	Boxing and Wrestling Control Amendment Act, 1998
137	Boxing and Wrestling Control Second Amendment Act, 1998

== 1999 ==
Act no.	Short title
	Constitution of the Republic of South Africa Amendment Act, 1999 (before 2005); Constitution Fourth Amendment Act of 1999 (after 2005)
	Constitution of the Republic of South Africa Second Amendment Act, 1999 (before 2005); Constitution Fifth Amendment Act of 1999 (after 2005)
1	Public Finance Management Act, 1999
2	Act number originally assigned to the Constitution Fifth Amendment Act
3	Act number originally assigned to the Constitution Fourth Amendment Act
4	Broadcasting Act, 1999
5	Public Service Amendment Act, 1999
6	Statistics Act, 1999
7	Public Investment Commissioners Amendment Act, 1999
8	University of Cape Town (Private) Act, 1999
9	Skills Development Levies Act, 1999
10	Pan South African Language Board Amendment Act, 1999
11	National Heritage Council Act, 1999
12	Tobacco Products Control Amendment Act, 1999
13	Child Care Amendment Act, 1999
14	Prevention and Treatment of Drug Dependency Amendment Act, 1999
15	Arms and Ammunition Amendment Act, 1999
16	Military Discipline Supplementary Measures Act, 1999
17	Military Veterans' Affairs Act, 1999
18	Land Restitution and Reform Laws Amendment Act, 1999
19	Onderstepoort Biological Products Incorporation Act, 1999
20	Road Traffic Management Corporation Act, 1999
21	National Road Traffic Amendment Act, 1999
22	Administrative Adjudication of Road Traffic Offences Amendment Act, 1999
23	Harmful Business Practices Amendment Act, 1999
24	Prevention of Organised Crime Amendment Act, 1999
25	National Heritage Resources Act, 1999
26	Judicial Matters Amendment Act, 1999
27	Housing Consumers Protection Measures Amendment Act, 1999
28	Housing Amendment Act, 1999
29	Public Finance Management Amendment Act, 1999
30	Division of Revenue Act, 1999
31	Appropriation Act, 1999
32	Taxation Laws Amendment Act, 1999
33	South African Sports Commission Amendment Act, 1999
34	Films and Publications Amendment Act, 1999
35	Competition Amendment Act, 1999
36	Gambling Matters Amendment Act, 1999
37	Companies Amendment Act, 1999
38	Prevention of Organised Crime Second Amendment Act, 1999
39	National Gambling Amendment Act, 1999
40	Financial Markets Control Amendment Act, 1999
41	Closed Pension Fund Amendment Act, 1999
42	Intelligence Services Control Amendment Act, 1999
43	Abolition of Certain Title Conditions Act, 1999
44	Sentech Amendment Act, 1999
45	National Water Amendment Act, 1999
46	Nuclear Energy Act, 1999
47	National Nuclear Regulator Act, 1999
48	Education Laws Amendment Act, 1999
49	World Heritage Convention Act, 1999
50	Rental Housing Act, 1999
51	Adjustments Appropriation Act, 1999
52	Second Adjustments Appropriation Act, 1999
53	Revenue Laws Amendment Act, 1999
54	Mutual Banks Amendment Act, 1999
55	Higher Education Amendment Act, 1999
56	National Student Financial Aid Scheme Act, 1999
57	South African Sports Commission Second Amendment Act, 1999
58	Local Government: Municipal Structures Amendment Act, 1999
59	Disestablishment of the Local Government Affairs Council Act, 1999
60	Housing Second Amendment Act, 1999
