= 1992 in Namibia =

- Decades: 1990s; 2000s; 2010s
- See also: Other events of 1992; Timeline of Namibian history

Events in the year 1992 in Namibia.

== Incumbents ==
- President: Sam Nujoma
- Prime Minister: Hage Geingob
- Chief Justice of Namibia: Hans Joachim Berker (until 5 July), Ismael Mahomed (from 5 July)

== Events ==
- 9 May - Michelle McLean, Miss Namibia, is crowned Miss Universe at Bangkok, Thailand. Is the first and only time that Namibia wins the contest.
- Barcelona Olympic Games - Frankie Fredericks wins the two first olympic medals for Namibia, both in athleticism.
- 30 November – 3 December – Local Authority Council and Regional Council Elections were held in the country.
