= 1990 in Namibia =

- Decades: 1990s; 2000s; 2010s
- See also: Other events of 1990; Timeline of Namibian history

The following events occurred during 1990 in Namibia.

== Incumbents ==
- President: Sam Nujoma (from 21 March)
- Prime Minister: Hage Geingob (from 21 March)
- Chief Justice: Hans Joachim Berker (from 21 March)

== Events ==
- 20 March - State President of South Africa F. W. de Klerk gives his assent to the Recognition of the Independence of Namibia Act, 1990, by which the South African government recognises the independence of Namibia.
- 21 March - Namibia is officially independent. Sam Nujoma is sworn in as the first President of Namibia, in a ceremony attended by representatives of 147 countries, including 20 heads of state. Sam Nujoma was sworn in as the first President of Namibia watched by Nelson Mandela (who had been released from prison shortly beforehand) and representatives from 147 countries, including 20 heads of state.

== Births ==
- 23 May - Raymond van Schoor, cricketer (d. 2015)
