= 1995 in Namibia =

- Decades: 1990s; 2000s; 2010s
- See also: Other events of 1995; Timeline of Namibian history

Events in the year 1995 in Namibia.

== Incumbents ==
- President: Sam Nujoma
- Prime Minister: Hage Geingob
- Chief Justice of Namibia: Ismael Mahomed

== Events ==
- 12 May – Miss Universe 1995, the 44th Miss Universe pageant, was held at the Windhoek Country Club Resort in Windhoek.
