= 1993 in Namibia =

- Decades: 1990s; 2000s; 2010s
- See also: Other events of 1993; Timeline of Namibian history

Events in the year 1993 in Namibia.

== Incumbents ==
- President: Sam Nujoma
- Prime Minister: Hage Geingob
- Chief Justice of Namibia: Ismael Mahomed

== Events ==
- 23 February – The National Council of the country was founded.
- September – The first Namibian dollar notes were issued.
