= 1994 in Namibia =

- Decades: 1990s; 2000s; 2010s
- See also: Other events of 1994; Timeline of Namibian history

Events in the year 1994 in Namibia.

== Incumbents ==
- President: Sam Nujoma
- Prime Minister: Hage Geingob
- Chief Justice of Namibia: Ismael Mahomed

== Events ==
- 4 & 5 December – General elections were held in the country.
