= Fraser v Children's Court, Pretoria North =

South African legal case

- Court: Constitutional Court of South Africa
- Full case name: Fraser v the Children's Court, Pretoria North and Others
- Decided: 5 February 1997
- Citations: [1997] ZACC 1, 1996 (8) BCLR 1085, 1997 (2) SA 218

Case history
- Prior action: Referral from the Transvaal Provincial Division in terms of section 102 of the Interim Constitution

Court membership
- Judges sitting: Chaskalson P, Mahomed DP, Ackermann, Didcott, Kriegler, Langa, Madala, Mokgoro, O'Regan & Sachs JJ

Case opinions
- Decision by: Mahomed

Keywords
- adoption; fathers' rights; illegitimacy

Fraser v Children's Court, Pretoria North and Others is a 1997 judgment of the Constitutional Court of South Africa which held that, in certain circumstances, the consent of the father is required before a child born out of wedlock may be adopted. In a unanimous decision, the court held that the provisions of the Child Care Act, 1983, which required only the mother's consent, were unconstitutional, but suspended its order for two years so that Parliament could amend the law accordingly.

== Facts ==
During the period for which the applicant, Fraser, and second respondent, Naude, lived together, the latter became pregnant. She decided to give the child up for adoption. The applicant did not agree with this decision and so launched series of unsuccessful applications to prevent the child being given up for adoption, and to be given custody of his child. He was denied this opportunity, as section 18(4)(d) of the Child Care Act only required the consent of the mother to give up children born out of wedlock for adoption.

== Judgment ==
The court declared this to be unconstitutional, as it discriminated against fathers of children born out of wedlock on the basis of their gender. The Constitutional Court ordered Parliament to bring this provision of the Child Care Act in line with the Constitution within two years.
