= Democratic Alliance v Minister of Home Affairs =

South African legal case concerning dual citizenship

- Court: Constitutional Court of South Africa
- Full case name: Democratic Alliance v Minister of Home Affairs and Another
- Decided: 6 May 2025
- Citation: [2025] ZACC 8

Case history
- Prior action: Application for confirmation from Supreme Court of Appeal

Court membership
- Judges sitting: Maya CJ, Madlanga ADCJ, Majiedt J, Mhlantla J, Seegobin AJ, Theron J, Tolmay AJ, Tshiqi J

Case opinions
- Section 6(1)(a) of the South African Citizenship Act, 1995, which provides that a South African citizen loses that citizenship if they voluntarily acquire another citizenship, is unconstitutional. People who lost their citizenship under section 6(1)(a) are deemed to have never lost their citizenship.
- Decision by: Majiedt J (unanimous)

Keywords
- Multiple citizenship; loss of citizenship

Democratic Alliance v Minister of Home Affairs and Another is a landmark decision of the Constitutional Court of South Africa which struck down section 6(1)(a) of the South African Citizenship Act, 1995 as unconstitutional. Section 6(1)(a) provided that a South African citizen who voluntarily acquired another country's citizenship automatically lost their South African citizenship, unless they applied in advance to the Minister of Home Affairs for permission to retain their citizenship. The court also ordered that all people who had lost their citizenship would be deemed to have never lost it.

The case was brought by the Democratic Alliance on behalf of South Africans who had unknowingly lost their citizenship. Dr Steven Spadijer appeared as an amicus curiae, with both the Democratic Alliance and Dr Spadijer urging the Court to strike down the ban on dual citizenship. The decision was given on 6 May 2025, as a confirmation of an order given by the Supreme Court of Appeal in 2023. The unanimous judgment was written by Justice Steven Majiedt.

== Background ==
In 1926 the parliament of the Union of South Africa enacted the British Nationality in the Union and Naturalization and Status of Aliens Act, 1926, which largely mirrored the UK's British Nationality and Status of Aliens Act 1914. Both acts provided that a British subject who voluntarily became naturalized in a foreign state would lose their British subject status. At the time South Africa was a dominion of the British Empire and shared a common British nationality with the UK and the other dominions.

A distinct South African citizenship was introduced by the South African Citizenship Act, 1949. This act provided that an adult South African citizen who acquired the citizenship of another country by a voluntary act (other than marriage) would lose their South African citizenship. In 1991 the Citizenship Act was amended to give the Minister of Home Affairs the power to exempt individuals or groups of people from the loss of citizenship.

In 1995, following the end of apartheid, a new citizenship law was enacted as the South African Citizenship Act, 1995. This act established two circumstances under which South African citizenship would automatically be lost: by acquiring citizenship of another country by a voluntary act (other than marriage); and by serving in the armed forces of another country at war with South Africa. The act allowed a citizen to apply to the Minister of Home Affairs to retain their South African citizenship before taking an act that would otherwise cause them to lose their citizenship.

In 1997 the current Constitution of South Africa came into force. In the Bill of Rights it provides that "No citizen may be deprived of citizenship." It was suggested by legal writers that the Citizenship Act's provisions for loss or deprivation of citizenship might be incompatible with the constitution.

== Case history ==
In July 2018 the Democratic Alliance (DA) applied to the Gauteng Division of the High Court for an order striking down section 6(1)(a) of the Citizenship Act as unconstitutional, and restoring the citizenship of all people who had lost their citizenship by the application of the section. The case was argued before judge Jody Kollapen on 10 May 2021. The DA argued that the section was unconstitutional for three reasons: that it was irrational, served no legitimate public purpose, and operated automatically without notice to those affected; that it violated section 20 of the constitution, which provides that no citizen may be deprived of citizenship; and that it limited other constitutional rights which are only available to citizens, like the right to vote and the right to enter South Africa.

The High Court judgment handed down on 6 August 2021 dismissed the application. The court found that the law was not irrational as the state had a legitimate interest in the regulation of citizenship, and the loss of citizenship was not automatic as it only followed a voluntary act of acquiring another citizenship. The court also rejected the challenge based on section 20 of the constitution, referring to section 3 of the constitution which provides that national legislation "must provide for the acquisition, loss and restoration of citizenship". The court reasoned that the loss of citizenship under the law in question was distinguished from the deprivation of citizenship prohibited by section 20. Finally, the court rejected the argument based on the limitation of other rights, finding that the loss of other rights resulting from the loss of citizenship was not a limitation of those rights.

The DA appealed the ruling to the Supreme Court of Appeal (SCA). The appeal was heard on 23 February 2023 before judges Zondi, Schippers, Matojane, Kathree-Setiloane, and Unterhalter. The appeal was upheld by the SCA and the order requested by the DA was granted. Judge Zondi, writing for a unanimous court, found that section 6(1)(a) was irrational because, given that dual citizenship itself was allowed, there was no reason to revoke South African citizenship on the acquisition of another citizenship; and also because it allowed unlimited discretion by the Minister of Home Affairs when deciding on applications to retain citizenship. The SCA also found that the section violated section 20 of the Bill of Rights and unjustifiably limited other rights dependent on citizenship.

The order of the Supreme Court of Appeal was referred to the Constitutional Court for confirmation, as is required in all cases where a court other than the Constitutional Court finds an act of parliament to be unconstitutional.

== In the Constitutional Court ==
The confirmation hearing was held on 5 November 2024 before Chief Justice Maya, acting Deputy Chief Justice Madlanga, judges Majiedt, Mhlantla, Theron and Tshiqi, and acting judges Seegobin and Tolmay. Legal scholar Steven Spadijer was admitted as amicus curiae. The government withdrew from formally opposing the confirmation, filing a notice to abide, but still made written submissions supporting the reasoning of the High Court.

The unanimous judgment of the Constitutional Court bench was written by Justice Majiedt and handed down on 6 May 2025. The court found that there was no meaningful distinction between "loss" and "deprivation" of citizenship, and that section 6(1)(a) therefore violated the prohibition on deprivation of citizenship in section 20 of the constitution. The court also found that there was no legitimate purpose for the law given that dual citizenship is otherwise allowed, and that the unlimited discretion of the Minister added to the arbitrary nature of the law.

The court also considered to the submissions of Dr Spadijer reviewing the state of the law in other countries, observing that permitting dual citizenship is the international norm. The judgment referred to constitutional provisions in various countries protecting dual citizenship or prohibiting involuntary loss of citizenship. The court also reviewed the United States cases Schneider v. Rusk and Afroyim v. Rusk, the Botswana case of Mathe v Attorney General, and several European Union cases.

The Constitutional Court confirmed the judgment of the SCA in full. The final order of the court declared that section 6(1)(a) of the Citizenship Act was unconstitutional, that the invalidity was retrospective to the enactment of the Citizenship Act in 1995, and that all citizens who had lost their citizenship under that provision were deemed to have never lost it. The government was also ordered to pay the DA's costs.

== Aftermath ==
The Democratic Alliance welcomed the judgment in its favour. Home affairs minister Leon Schreiber also welcomed the judgment and announced that the Department of Home Affairs would develop an online portal to lodge requests for retention of citizenship. In August 2025 it was reported that citizens who had regained citizenship under the law were struggling to obtain passports, causing anxiety around their ability to travel to South Africa. The online citizenship reinstatement portal was launched in November 2025.
