= 1991 in Namibia =

- Decades: 1990s; 2000s; 2010s
- See also: Other events of 1991; Timeline of Namibian history

Events in the year 1991 in Namibia.

== Incumbents ==
- President: Sam Nujoma
- Prime Minister: Hage Geingob
- Chief Justice of Namibia: Hans Joachim Berker

== Events ==
- 29 April – 3 May – A UNESCO seminar was held in Windhoek, where the Windhoek Declaration for the Development of a Free, Independent and Pluralistic Press was made.
- The Namibia Press Association was renamed to the Namibia Press Agency.
