= Hennie van Heerden =

South African judge

Deputy Chief Justice of South Africa
- In office 1997–2000
- Appointed by: Nelson Mandela
- Succeeded by: Pius Langa

Personal details
- Born: 28 April 1931 Edenburg, Orange Free State; Union of South Africa
- Died: 2007 (aged 75–76)
- Education: Stellenbosch University; University of the Orange Free State (LLD)

Hendrik Johannes Otto van Heerden (28 April 1931 - c. 2007) was a South African judge who was the first Deputy Chief Justice of South Africa from 1997 to 2000. Formerly an advocate and silk in Bloemfontein, he joined the bench in the Free State Provincial Division in 1978 and was promoted to the Appellate Division in 1982. He was Acting Chief Justice of South Africa in 2000.

== Early life and career ==
Van Heerden was born in Edenburg in the former Orange Free State, where he attended high school. He studied law at Stellenbosch University, completing a BA cum laude in 1951 and an LLB cum laude in 1953.

From 1954 to 1959, he returned to the Free State to join the law faculty of the University of the Orange Free State, where he was a senior lecturer and where he completed his LLD in 1959. His doctoral dissertation, on competition law and unfair competition, was based on research conducted in 1956 at Yale University and the University of Heidelberg, and it was later published as a book.

Later in 1959, van Heerden joined the Free State Bar. He practised as an advocate in Bloemfontein for the next two decades, during which time, from 1963 to 1965, he represented South Africa in the International Court of Justice in two cases concerning the status of South West Africa. He was acting chairperson of the Press Council from 1974 to 1975, chairperson of the General Council of the Bar from 1976 to 1977, and Senior Counsel from 1972 onwards.

== Judicial career ==
=== Supreme Court ===
On 1 February 1978, van Heerden joined the bench as a judge of the Free State Provincial Division of the Supreme Court of South Africa. He served as an acting judge in the Appellate Division from June 1980 onwards, and he was permanently elevated to that division on 16 December 1982. He also returned to the South African Law Commission as a member from 1982 to 1995 and as chairman from 1988 to 1995. Commentators described van Heerden as a conservative but apolitical judge, and Fink Haysom and Clive Plasket admired him for dissenting from Acting Chief Justice Pierre Rabie's decision to uphold restrictions on freedom of expression during the 1986 state of emergency.

=== Deputy Chief Justice ===
After the end of apartheid, the 1996 Constitution reformed the Supreme Court, turning the Appellate Division into the new Supreme Court of Appeal. Van Heerden, who by then was the most senior member of the appellate bench, was a popular candidate to succeed Michael Corbett as Chief Justice and head of the new court; indeed, a large number of senior judges objected publicly when President Nelson Mandela announced that Ismail Mahomed was his own preferred candidate. When the National Association of Democratic Lawyers called for van Heerden to withdraw from the contest, Judge of Appeal Joos Hefer vociferously defended him, arguing in Beeld that Mahomed should withdraw instead. The Mail & Guardian compared the saga to the similar controversy that had followed L. C. Steyn's elevation ahead of Oliver Schreiner in 1959.

After the Judicial Service Commission interviewed Mahomed and van Heerden in Cape Town in late 1996, Mahomed was appointed as Chief Justice and van Heerden as his deputy. When Mahomed fell ill in February 2000, van Heerden was appointed as acting Chief Justice, and he returned to that position when Mohamed died, acting as Chief Justice from 17 June 2000 until his retirement at the end of that year.

== Personal life ==
Van Heerden had three children with his first wife, Jean Marie Heese, who died in February 1994. He married Desiree Jo du Toit in 1996.
