= Regulation of Foreign Military Assistance Act, 1998 =

Act of the South African parliament

Parliament of South Africa
- Long title: Act to regulate the rendering of foreign military assistance by South African juristic persons, citizens, persons permanently resident within the Republic and foreign citizens rendering such assistance from within the borders of the Republic; and to provide for matters connected therewith.
- Citation: Act No. 15 of 1998
- Enacted by: Parliament of South Africa
- Assented to: 20 May 1998
- Commenced: 18 September 1998
- Status: In force

The Regulation of Foreign Military Assistance Act, 1998 (FMAA) is an act of the Parliament of South Africa which prohibits mercenary activities both within South Africa and abroad, and prohibits citizens and residents from lending unauthorized foreign military assistance.

== Background ==
The history of mercenaries in Africa is ancient, but they rose to new levels of activity, power, and scrutiny during the periods of decolonization and the Cold War with the rise of the private military company (PMC).

The nascent post-colonial governments of the region were often abysmally short on resources, manpower, and equipment, allowing PMCs to even act as kingmakers-for-hire for distant, resource-interested corporations and competing superpowers, threatening stability across the entire continent. Poverty, widespread in the region, enticed many men of working age to join these stateless, for-profit paramilitaries.

In 1992, one such company, the South Africa-based Executive Outcomes (EO), drew international attention for its involvement in the Angolan Civil War, in which it had begun the conflict supporting the rebel anti-communist group National Union for the Total Independence of Angola (UNITA) against the Marxist–Leninist People's Movement for the Liberation of Angola (MPLA) government based in Luanda, before accepting a contract with Ranger Oil to protect its facilities from UNITA. EO then accepted a contract from the MPLA to help it fight, eventually victoriously, against UNITA, which would help cement this reputation of itself and other PMCs as dangerous to the stability of the region. EO and its subsidiaries such as London-based Sandline International would operate across the entire continent, even conducting operations as far away as to participate in the Bougainville conflict in Papua New Guinea.

The destabilizing nature of these PMCs along with their sometimes horrifying conduct caused international, though not unanimous, condemnation. Various national and international groups made attempts to ban or at least restrict their activities. The Angolan government tried and imprisoned or executed several mercenaries in 1976, but found no applicable international law with which to condemn their actions. The United Nations enacted Article 47 of the 1977 Additional Protocols I of the Geneva Conventions, denying mercenaries fitting its definition the legal status of combatants and prisoners of war, and the 1989 International Convention against the Recruitment, Use, Financing and Training of Mercenaries, which attempted to ban mercenaries outright, but several important countries including every permanent member of the UN Security Council did not ratify it. The Organisation of African Unity (OAU)’s Convention for the Elimination of Mercenarism in Africa also attempted to ban use of and employment as mercenaries, but even as of 2006, only had 11 signatories.

The government of South Africa was among the organizations making active effort to curb the spread of PMCs across Africa through legislation such as the 1998 Act.

== Content ==
=== Prohibition of mercenary activity ===
The FMAA criminalizes financing, engaging in, or recruiting, training or employing people for mercenary activity, in South Africa or abroad, punishable by fine, imprisonment, or both.

=== Prohibition of unauthorized rendering of foreign military assistance ===
The FMAA criminalizes offering military or military-adjacent services, including advice, training, recruitment, medical services, procurement or equipment, or armed security in conflict areas, or conduct or attempt any coup, to any entity or person without specific and likely conditional authorization from the National Conventional Arms Control Committee, or to fail to comply with conditions set by the NCACC, punishable by fine, imprisonment, or both.

== Legacy ==
The FMAA has been criticized as being unenforceable due to being too broad in its definitions of what constitutes military and security work.

As a direct result of the FMAA's enactment, Executive Outcomes ceased all direct activity in Angola and elsewhere on December 31, 1998, and many of its former contracts are now held by local companies such as Teleservice, some of whose personnel now receive training by ex-SADF EO personnel in South Africa.

Other mercenaries and mercenary groups reportedly dodge, subvert, or flaunt the law as well. South Africa-based Meteoric Tactical Solutions, and South African-UK company Erinys International have both reportedly carried out operations prohibited by the Act such as security and military training without NCACC approval, without consequence. South Africans continue to serve in the Israeli Defense Force, the Nigerian Armed Forces, and other PMCs worldwide, thus far without being effectively prosecuted. New South African PMCs have even been founded since the passing of the bill, such as Erinys South Africa in 2002, STTEP International in 2006, and Dyck Advisory Group in 2012. South Africans continue to be employed in other PMCs worldwide.

In Cape Town in 2005, Mark Thatcher pled guilty of violating the FMAA during the 2004 Equatorial Guinea coup attempt and was sentenced to a fine of $506,000 and suspended prison sentence.

The FMAA is set to be repealed by the even stricter Prohibition of Mercenary Activities and Regulations of Certain Activities in Country of Armed Conflict Act, 2006, which was assented in 2007 but not yet put into effect as of March 2024.

== See also ==
- List of acts of the Parliament of South Africa, 1990–1999
- Private security industry in South Africa
