= Recognition of the Independence of Namibia Act, 1990 =

Parliament of South Africa
- Long title: Act to recognize the independence of Namibia; and to provide for matters connected therewith.
- Citation: Act No. 34 of 1990
- Enacted by: Parliament of South Africa
- Assented to: 20 March 1990
- Commenced: 21 March 1990
- Status: Spent

The Recognition of the Independence of Namibia Act, 1990 is an act of the Parliament of South Africa by which the South African government recognised the independence of Namibia, which had been under disputed South African administration as South West Africa. The act received the assent of State President F. W. de Klerk on 20 March 1990 and came into force on the following day, the date of Namibian independence.

The act relinquishes South African authority over Namibia, and provides that, as far as South Africa is concerned, South African laws no longer have effect in Namibia. (The Constitution of Namibia, however, provides for the laws in force in Namibia prior to independence to continue in force subject to amendment.) The act also contains a savings clause providing that it does not recognise "the validity of any provision of the Constitution of Namibia which purports to derogate from the sovereignty of the Republic over its territory." This may be seen as a reference to the territorial dispute over Walvis Bay, as the Constitution of Namibia claimed Namibian sovereignty over Walvis Bay, which remained part of South Africa until it was transferred to Namibia in 1994.

The act was subsequently followed by the South African Citizenship at Attainment of Independence by Namibia Regulation Act, 1990, which provided for the loss or retention of South African citizenship by residents of Namibia, and by two Application of Certain Laws to Namibia Abolition Acts and several General Law Amendment Acts which repealed laws specific to South West Africa and amended laws to remove references to the former territory.

In a 2014 review of legislation administered by the Department of International Relations and Cooperation, the South African Law Reform Commission recommended that the act should be retained on the statute book to ensure legal certainty on the status of Namibia.

== See also ==
- Namibia–South Africa relations
- Transfer of Walvis Bay to Namibia Act, 1993
