= Post Office Amendment Act, 1991 =

South African legislation

The South African Post Office Amendment Act separated the now defunct South African Department of Posts and Telecommunications (SAPT) into a separate post company and telecommunications company. The act split the SAPT into Telkom SA ltd., a wholly state owned communications company, The South African Post Office, and a much smaller Department of Posts and Telecommunications, the task of which is to administer the Radio and Post Office Acts.
