= Bantu Homelands Constitution Act, 1971 =

Apartheid law

Parliament of South Africa
- Long title: Act to provide for the establishment of legislative assemblies and executive councils in Bantu areas, the powers, functions and duties of such assemblies and councils, the disestablishment of territorial authorities upon the establishment of executive councils, the declaration as self-governing territories of areas for which legislative assemblies have been established, and the constitution of Cabinets for such territories; to amend the Bantu Authorities Act, 1951, so as to regulate further the constitution of tribal authorities and to provide for the proof by affidavit of the membership of tribal and regional authorities and the fact whether or not Bantu law and custom were observed in particular matters; to amend certain definitions in the Bantu Homelands Citizenship Act, 1970; and to provide for incidental matters.
- Citation: Act No. 718 of 1971
- Enacted by: Parliament of South Africa
- Assented to: 26 March 1971
- Commenced: 31 March 1971
- Repealed: 27 April 1994
- Administered by: Minister of Bantu Administration and Development

Repealed by
- Constitution of the Republic of South Africa, 1993

Related legislation
- Bantu Authorities Act, 1951; Bantu Homelands Citizenship Act, 1970
- Status: Repealed

The Bantu Homelands Constitution Act (Act No. 21 of 1971) enabled the government of South Africa to grant independence to any "Homeland" as determined by the South African apartheid government. It was renamed several times, becoming the Black States Constitution Act, 1971, then the National States Constitution Act, 1971, and finally the Self-governing Territories Constitution Act, 1971. In accordance with this act, independence was eventually granted to Transkei in 1976, Bophuthatswana in 1977, Venda in 1979, and Ciskei in 1981.

Map of the homelands established in South Africa

The granting of independence had been prepared by earlier acts including the establishment of tribal, territorial and regional authorities in accordance with the Bantu Authorities Act, 1951 and the Promotion of Bantu Self-government Act, 1959.

== Repeal ==
The Act was repealed by the Interim Constitution of South Africa on 27 April 1994.

== See also ==
- Category:Apartheid laws in South Africa
- Apartheid in South Africa
