= Medicines and Related Substances Control Amendment Act, 1997 =

Law in South Africa to fight the HIV/AIDS epidemic

Medicines and Related Substance 1997

Government of South Africa
- Enacted by: Government of South Africa
- Enacted: 1997
- Status: Current legislation

South Africa's Medicines and Related Substance 1997 is a law enacted a compulsory license in order to fight HIV/AIDS epidemic. The intent of the Act was to reduce drug prices by allowing generic substitution of off-patent drugs, the parallel importation of on-patent drugs as well as price transparency.

== Enactment ==
In an effort to combat the growing HIV/AIDS epidemic, the Government of South Africa enacted the Medicines and Related Substances Control Amendment Act in 1997. The Act aimed to both reduce the cost of drugs and increase their availability.

== Challenge to the Law ==
In February 1998, the South African Pharmaceutical Manufactures Association and forty Multinational Corporations (MNC) brought a suit against the government of South Africa for its passage of the Medicines and Related Substances Control Amendment Act No. 90 of 1997, arguing that it violated the Agreement on Trade-Related Aspects of Intellectual Property Rights. The intent of the Act was to reduce drug prices by allowing generic substitution of off-patent drugs, the parallel importation of on-patent drugs as well as price transparency.

In agreement with the suit, the United States (US) and European Communities (EC) threatened economic sanctions. However, HIV/AIDS activists successfully contested this, demonstrators alleging that then United States presidential-candidate Al Gore was killing babies in Africa—and forced the US and EC to back off the South African government. As a result of immense international pressure, including from NGOs such as Oxfam, the pharmaceutical companies dropped their case in April 2001.
