= S v Acheson =

S v Acheson is an important case in Namibian and South African law, especially in the area of criminal procedure. It was heard in the Namibia High Court from 18 to 20 April 1990, by Mahomed AJ, who handed down judgment on 23 April 1990. T. Grobbelaar SC (with him GH Oosthuizen) appeared for the accused, and H. Heyman for the State.

== Adjournments ==
Section 168 of the Criminal Procedure Act, in terms of which a court may adjourn proceedings "if [... it] deems it necessary or expedient," bestows upon the court seized with the matter a judicial discretion as to whether to grant an adjournment or not. The word "necessary" in the section means "reasonably necessary" in the particular circumstances of the case, and "expedient," in the context, refers to what is advantageous or judicious or proper or suitable to the case.

When an adjournment is sought in order to call witnesses who are not available in court, the court would, ordinarily, wish to satisfy itself as to

1. whether the witnesses whom the party seeks to call on the adjourned date are material witnesses; and
2. whether there is a reasonable expectation (not a certainty) that the attendance of such witnesses will be procured on the adjourned date.

The fact that these two basic requirements are met does not mean that the court must necessarily exercise its discretion in favour of an adjournment. Some other circumstances which would bear upon the exercise of a discretion include the following:

- the length of the adjournment sought;
- how long the case has been pending;
- the duration of and reasons for any previous adjournments;
- whether or not there has been any remissness from the party seeking the adjournment and, if so, the degree and nature of such remissness;
- the seriousness of the offence with which the accused is charged;
- the attitude and the legitimate and reasonable needs and concerns of the adversary of the party seeking the adjournment;
- the resources and capacity and ability of the party affected by the adjournment to protect and advance its case on the adjourned date;
- the financial prejudice caused to such party by the adjournment;
- the public interest in the matter; and
- whether or not the accused is in the interim to be kept in custody.

== Facts ==
The accused, an Irish citizen, had been charged with the murder of a prominent member of SWAPO. He had been arrested on 13 September 1989, and had been in continued custody thereafter. The accused was to be arraigned on the charge of murder in the Supreme Court on 18 April 1990. On 2 March, the investigating officer had procured warrants for the arrest of two South Africans suspected of complicity in the murder. No trace of the two could be found prior to the independence of Namibia on 21 March 1990, although they surfaced openly in South Africa thereafter.

The State also required the presence of four South African witnesses, upon whom subpoenas were served, through their legal representative, on 2 April. With the advent of independence, the Namibian State no longer had the means to compel the attendance of any of the six South Africans. When the accused appeared in the High Court on 18 April, the State sought an adjournment of some six weeks to enable it to procure the attendance of the six absentees.

It was the State's case that the evidence sought to be led by the four witnesses was material, in that such evidence would show that the accused had had a motive to kill the deceased. It was submitted that such evidence would show that the accused had been connected with the Civil Co-operation Bureau (a division of the Department of Defence of the Republic of South Africa), which body had had an interest in eliminating the deceased. The joinder of the two co-accused was contended to be important in order to strengthen the State's case against the accused, because it would render admissible against the accused certain additional evidence on the basis of common purpose.

It was pointed out, for the accused,

- that the absentees were resident in a foreign jurisdiction;
- that, on the evidence of the investigating officer, there appeared to be no reasonable prospect of their voluntarily coming to Namibia either as witnesses or to stand trial as co-accused; and
- that, as experienced policemen, they had the knowledge and skills to avoid apprehension.

The response of the State was that the machinery of international diplomacy might secure the appearance of the absentees in court.

== Judgment ==
The court pointed out that each of the legal mechanisms, all South African, which the State had suggested might be employed to procure the attendance of the absentees would have to involve successful diplomatic initiatives between the governments of the Republics of Namibia and South Africa. It concluded, from the very limited evidence which the State was able to tender concerning such diplomatic initiatives, that there was no reasonable prospect that the absentees concerned would be procured by the State to enable it to proceed on the merits on the adjourned date some six weeks later.

The court decided, however, to adjourn the proceedings for some two weeks for the limited purpose of affording the State an opportunity of obtaining some tangible and specific evidence of diplomatic initiatives which would enable the court to decide whether a long adjournment should thereafter be granted or considered, with the caveat that, should such tangible information not be forthcoming, the State would have to elect whether to proceed with the trial with such evidence as it would then be able to lead, or to withdraw the charges. The reasons for this decision were the following:

1. The murder of the deceased was a matter of fundamental public importance. He had been a prominent public figure who had been a member of the present governing party and during his lifetime had been perceived to be a vigorous proponent of the right of the Namibian people to self-determination and to emancipation from colonialism and racism. The vigorous prosecution of whoever might have been responsible for his cold-blooded murder was clearly in the public interest and crucial to the administration and image of justice in Namibia. Such image and that interest might prejudicially be impaired if there followed a perception in the public that justice had been defeated by procedural complexities, by legal stratagems, by tactical manoeuvres or by any improper collusion.
2. The dilemma in which the State had found itself had arisen from the very extraordinary circumstances created by the position of a nation in transition, caught between the certainty of its colonial mechanisms and the articulation and effectiveness of the new mechanisms created to underpin and support its birth as a new and independent State. The State had found itself with warrants validly issued in the old State, but not easily enforceable on the date when they needed to be enforced. It was entitled to a fair opportunity to show with what promptitude and effect it could clear the grey areas attendant upon the transition from the old to the new.
3. Relevant to the prospects of successful diplomatic initiatives, which might lead to the procurement of the absentees concerned, was the likely attitude of the neighbouring state, South Africa, to the legitimate needs of Namibia to secure justice for its own inhabitants. It was not to be believed that either Namibia or South Africa, in the pursuit of their mutual interests, would ever deliberately wish to protect those within their borders who had seriously invaded the rights of the residents of a neighbouring country, or who sought to escape from their obligations to assist the courts of that country in determining the guilt or otherwise of those accused of having done so. In this regard, the Court referred to a speech made by the State President of South Africa, in response to a call by the Foreign Minister of Namibia for an investigation into the circumstances of the death of the deceased, in which the State President undertook to co-operate closely with the Namibian authorities in order to ensure that the law took its course and that justice be done. The court held that such undertaking would clearly be relevant to the Namibian State's prospects of success in initiating any diplomatic mechanisms to procure the attendance of the absentee persons concerned.
4. The State had received definite information only on 12 April that the absentee witnesses were resisting attendance in court. That had left the State with very few days in which to set in motion the necessary diplomatic initiatives.
5. Any prejudice to the accused caused by a short postponement for the limited purpose stated would substantially be mitigated if he were released on bail in the interim, if bail could properly be allowed in all the circumstances.

The State opposed the granting of bail on the grounds that there was a danger that the accused would not stand trial, regard being had to the fact that he was an Irish citizen with no real roots in Namibia or in any African country; that there was no existing extradition treaty with Ireland; and that the Namibian borders were extensive and difficult to police.

The court held that the following were considerations which should be taken into account in deciding whether to grant bail to an accused person:

- Was it more likely that the accused would stand his trial or was it more likely that he would abscond and forfeit his bail? The determination of that issue involved a consideration of sub-issues such as
  - how deep his emotional, occupational, and family roots within the country where he was to stand trial were;
  - what his assets in that country were;
  - what means he had to flee from the country;
  - how much he could afford the forfeiture of the bail money;
  - what travel documents he had to enable him to leave the country;
  - what arrangements existed or might later exist to extradite him if he fled to another country;
  - how inherently serious was the offence in respect of which he had been charged;
  - how strong the case against him was and how much inducement there would be for him to avoid standing trial;
  - how severe the punishment was likely to be if he were found guilty; and
  - how stringent were the conditions of his bail and how difficult would it be for him to evade effective policing of his movements.
- Was there a reasonable likelihood that, if the accused were released on bail, he would tamper with witnesses or interfere with the relevant evidence or cause such evidence to be suppressed or distorted? The determination of this issue involved an examination of other factors, such as
  - whether or not the accused was aware of the identity of such witnesses or of the nature of such evidence;
  - whether or not the witnesses concerned had already made their statements and had committed themselves to giving evidence or whether it was still the subject-matter of continuing investigations;
  - what the accused's relationship with such witnesses was and whether or not it was likely that they might be influenced or intimidated by him; and
  - whether or not any condition preventing communication between such witnesses and the accused could effectively be policed.
- How prejudicial might it be for the accused in all the circumstances to be kept in custody by being denied bail? This involved an examination of issues such as
  - the duration for which the accused had already been incarcerated;
  - the duration for which he would have to be in custody before his trial was completed;
  - the cause of any delay in the completion of his trial and whether or not the accused was wholly or partially to be blamed for such delay;
  - the extent to which the accused needed to keep working in order to meet his financial obligations;
  - the extent to which he might be prejudiced in engaging legal assistance for his defence and in effectively preparing his defence if he were to remain in custody; and
  - the health of the accused.

After applying the above considerations to the circumstances of the case, the Court concluded that bail should be allowed subject to stringent conditions designed to minimise the danger that the accused might abscond or otherwise prejudice the interests of justice. It was accordingly ordered that the accused be released on bail of R4,000, subject to stringent conditions as to reporting to the police and subject to strict limitations upon

- the accused's freedom to leave his home address outside of working and reporting hours; and
- his freedom of movement between his home address, his work address and the police station.

== See also ==
- Criminal procedure in Namibia
- Criminal procedure in South Africa
- Namibia-South Africa relations
