= Restoration and Extension of South African Citizenship Act, 1993 =

Renaturalization law passed at the end of the apartheid era of South Africa

Restoration and Extension of South African Citizenship Act No. 196 of 1993

Parliament of South Africa
- Long title: To provide for the restoration and extension of South African citizenship to certain citizens of the Republics of Transkei, Bophuthatswana, Venda and Ciskei with effect from 1 January 1994; and to provide for matters connected therewith.
- Enacted by: Parliament of South Africa
- Assented to: 22 December 1993
- Commenced: 1 January 1994

Repealed by
- South African Citizenship Act, 1995
- Status: Repealed

The Restoration and Extension of South African Citizenship Act (Act No. 196 of 1993) was a naturalisation law passed at the end of the apartheid era in South Africa in 1993 and prior to first election in 1994. It restored South African citizenship rights to black South Africans, lost after the creation of four independent "homelands" or Bantustans.

== Background ==
This Act of Parliament restored South African citizenship to Black inhabitants of independent homelands of Transkei, Bophuthatswana, Venda, and Ciskei. These independent states where given self-government between 1972 and 1977 due to an Apartheid policy of forced removal of all black inhabitants out of what was planned to be, a "white South Africa", and into homelands belonging to one of ten possible Black racial groups. Around seven million people regained their citizenship and allowed them to vote in the first 1994 South African general election open to all races.

== Content of the Act ==
The following is a brief description of the sections of the Restoration and Extension of South African Citizenship Act, 1993:

=== Definitions and interpretation ===
Section 1

Defines the explanations of keywords in the Act.

Section 2

Defines the restoration of South African citizenship to citizens that had lost it due to the enactment of four acts governing the independent homelands mention in the schedule.

Section 3

Defines the restoration of South African citizenship to citizens that would have been, by birth or descent South African, if had been lost due to the enactment of four law acts in the schedule for the independent homelands.

Section 4

Defines that citizenship by naturalization can be applied for and would be granted for those who were defined as citizens of the independent homelands as described by the Acts in the schedule.

Section 5

Defines the end of citizenship determination in the independent homelands as described in the Acts listed in the schedule.

Section 6

Defines the interpretation of certain references in South African Citizenship Act, 1949 to South African citizens and citizenship.

Section 7

Defines the repealing of the Restoration of South African Citizenship Act, 1986 (Act No. 73 of 1986).

Section 8

Defines the name of the Act.

Schedule

- Status of Transkei Act, 1976 (Act No. 100 of 1976).
- Status of Bophuthatswana Act, 1977 (Act No. 89 of 1977).
- Status of Venda Act, 1979 (Act No. 107 of 1979).
- Status of Ciskei Act, 1981 (Act No. 110 of 1981).

== Repeals ==
This act repealed the Restoration of South African Citizenship Act, 1986 (Act No. 73 of 1986) and later, in 1995 a new law governing citizenship in South Africa was enacted with the passing of the South African Citizenship Act, 1995.
