= State of Emergency Act, 1997 =

South African legislative act on states of emergency

The State of Emergency Act, 1997 is a South African act of legislation that governs the use of a declared state of emergency by the President of South Africa. The President may declare a state of emergency only when "the life of the nation is threatened by war, invasion, general insurrection, disorder, natural disaster or other public emergency" and if the ordinary laws and government powers are not sufficient to restore peace and order.

The declaration is made by proclamation in the Government Gazette and may only apply from the time of publication, not retroactively. It can only continue for 21 days unless the National Assembly grants an extension, which may be for at most three months at a time. The High Courts have the power, subject to confirmation by the Constitutional Court, to determine the validity of the declaration of a state of emergency.

During a state of emergency the President has the power to make emergency regulations "necessary or expedient" to restore peace and order and end the emergency. This power can be delegated to other authorities. Emergency measures can violate the Bill of Rights, but only to a limited extent. Some rights are inviolable, including amongst others the rights to life and to human dignity; the prohibition of discrimination on the grounds of race, sex or religion; the prohibition of torture or inhuman punishment; and the right of accused people to a fair trial. Any violation of a constitutional right must be strictly required by the emergency. Emergency measures may not indemnify the government or individuals for illegal actions. They may impose criminal penalties, but not exceeding three years' imprisonment. They may not require military service beyond that required by the ordinary laws governing the defence force. An emergency measure may be disapproved by the National Assembly, in which case it lapses, and no emergency measure may interfere with the elections, powers or sittings of Parliament or the provincial legislatures. The courts have the power to determine the validity of any emergency measure, and this power may not be ousted even during the emergency.
