= Administrative Adjudication of Road Traffic Offences Act, 1998 =

Act of the Parliament of South Africa

Parliament of South Africa
- Long title: Act to promote road traffic quality by providing for a scheme to discourage road traffic contraventions, to facilitate the adjudication of road traffic infringements, to support the prosecution of offences in terms of the national and provincial laws relating to road traffic, and implement a points demerit system; to provide for the establishment of an agency to administer the scheme; to provide for the establishment of a board to represent the agency; and to provide for matters connected therewith.
- Citation: Act No. 46 of 1998
- Enacted by: Parliament of South Africa
- Assented to: 9 September 1998
- Commenced: Different dates in different municipalities

Amended by
- Administrative Adjudication of Road Traffic Offences Amendment Acts, 1999, 2000 and 2002
- Status: In force

The Administrative Adjudication of Road Traffic Offences Act, 1998 (AARTO, Act No. 46 of 1998) is an act of the Parliament of South Africa which introduces a points demerit system for violations of traffic law. It is managed by the Road Traffic Management Corporation (RTMC), a public entity under the Department of Transport. Although the act was enacted in 1998, it has not yet been fully implemented, but has now been rescheduled for a national rollout to the whole country early in 2012.

South Africa has one of the highest road accident and fatality statistics in the world and the intention of AARTO is to address the situation by encouraging responsible driving habits amongst the motoring public.

AARTO introduces a Demerit Points System, for the first time in South Africa, which is intended to penalize drivers and fleet operators who are habitual offenders. Under AARTO, traffic infringements will result in points being allocated to a driver's licence. On reaching 12 points the licence is suspended. If no infringements occur within a three-month period a point will be deducted. If a license is suspended three times it is permanently revoked.

The Act has serious implications for the entire South African Transport Industry. All role players, from senior management to the lowest level driver employee are affected. Driver based employees stand to lose their livelihood if their licence is suspended. Management and fleet operators may face crippling blows to their businesses as entire fleets can be grounded.

In spite of its pending implementation on a national basis, there is a great deal of uncertainty about the AARTO Act and numerous amendments have made it difficult for the public and business sector to adequately prepare.

Education on AARTO is imperative for all role players to be adequately trained on AARTO prior to its implementation. Failure to prepare for and comply with the provisions of this act could be disastrous for individuals and businesses.

== General references ==
- SA Government Official AARTO Website
- AARTO Explained, An RTMC Publication
- Administrative Adjudication of Road Traffic Offences (AARTO) Act 46 of 1998, Amendment Act 22 of 1999
- Road Traffic Management Corporation Act of 1999
- National Road Traffic Amendment Act Section 1 of Act 93 of 1996, as amended by section 1 of Act 8 of 1998
- Dennis Jackson - AARTO Lecturer and Consultant
