= Hans Joachim Berker =

Namibian judge

Hans Joachim Berker (1924–1992) was a Namibian judge. He served as the first Chief Justice in the Supreme Court of Namibia from 1990 to 1992.

== Biography ==
Berker was born on 28 March 1924 in Hamburg, Germany. His family moved to South West Africa in 1928, and Berker attended school in Windhoek. He obtained a B.A. from Rhodes University in Grahamstown, South Africa, and later an LL.B from Oxford University, United Kingdom.

During his career Berker was known to be a liberal who opposed apartheid. He defended SWAPO activists Aaron Mushimba and Hendrik Shikongo, accused of the 1975 assassination of a senior church figure of former Ovamboland.

Berker became president of the High Court in Windhoek on 1 March 1983, succeeding Frans Badenhorst. He later served as Judge President of the Supreme Court of South West Africa. On 21 March 1990, the day of Namibian independence, he was appointed Chief Justice at the newly founded Supreme Court of Namibia. After his death he was succeeded by Ismael Mahomed.

== Private life ==
Berker was married to Marianne Berker, née Leis. He was an avid sportsman in his private life, winning Class II of the 1973 Cape to Rio yacht race. Berker died in Windhoek on 5 July 1992.
