= Deputy Chief Justice of South Africa =

Judicial post in South Africa

- List: 10 other official names: Adjunk-Hoofregter van Suid-Afrika (Afrikaans); iSekela leJaji eliKhulu weSewula Afrika (Southern Ndebele); leSekela-Jaji eyiNtloko waseMzantsi Afrika (Xhosa); iPhini iJaji Eliyinhloko waseNingizimu Afrika (Zulu); liSekela Lijaji Lelikhulu weleNingizimu Afrika (Swazi); Motlatšamoahlodimogolo wa Afrika Borwa (Northern Sotho); Motlatsi wa Moahlodi e Moholo wa Afrika Borwa (Sotho); Motlatsa Moatlhodimogolo wa Aforika Borwa (Tswana); Xandla xa Muavanyisinkulu wa Afrika-Dzonga (Tsonga); Muthusa Muhaṱuli Muhulwane wa Afrika Tshipembe (Venda)
- Incumbent; Dunstan Mlambo since 1 August 2025
- Style: The Honourable
- Nominator: Judicial Services Commission
- Appointer: President of South Africa
- Constituting instrument: Constitution of the Republic of South Africa Second Amendment Act, 1995
- Inaugural holder: Ismail Mahomed
- Formation: 20 September 1995
- Salary: R 2,765,159 per year

The deputy chief Justice of South Africa is a judge in the Constitutional Court of South Africa and the second-highest judicial post in the Republic of South Africa, after the chief justice. The post, originally called "Deputy President of the Constitutional Court", was created in September 1995 by the Constitution of the Republic of South Africa Second Amendment Act, 1995, which was an amendment to the Interim Constitution. The position was retained by the final Constitution which came into force in February 1997. In November 2001 the Sixth Amendment of the Constitution of South Africa restructured the judiciary, and the post was renamed to deputy chief justice.

The first deputy president of the Constitutional Court was Ismail Mahomed. In 1997 he became chief justice, and was replaced by Pius Langa, who continued as deputy chief justice after 2001. Justice Langa was elevated to chief justice in 2005, and succeeded by Dikgang Moseneke. Moseneke retired on 20 May 2016.

== List of deputy chief justices ==
- Ismail Mahomed (1995 – 1997; as Deputy President of the Constitutional Court)
- Hennie van Heerden (1997 – 2000)
- Pius Langa (2001 – 2005)
- Dikgang Moseneke (2005 – 2016)
- Bess Nkabinde (Acting; 2016 – 2017)
- Raymond Zondo (June 2017 - April 2022)
- Mandisa Maya (1 September 2022 - 31 August 2024)
- Mbuyiseli Madlanga (Acting; 1 September 2024 - 31 July 2025)
- Dunstan Mlambo (August 2025 - present)
