= South African nationality law =

South African Citizenship Act, 1995

Parliament of South Africa
- Long title: To provide for the acquisition, loss and resumption of South African citizenship; and for matters incidental thereto.
- Citation: No. 88 of 1995
- Territorial extent: South Africa
- Enacted by: 22nd South African Parliament
- Assented to: 28 September 1995
- Commenced: 6 October 1995
- Administered by: Department of Home Affairs
- Status: Amended

South African nationality law details the conditions by which a person is a national of South Africa. The primary law governing nationality requirements is the South African Citizenship Act, 1995, which came into force on 6 October 1995.

Any person born to at least one South African parent receives citizenship at birth. Children born to a legal resident of the country are permitted to South African citizenship only when they reach the age of majority. Foreign nationals may be granted citizenship after meeting a residence requirement (usually five years).

South Africa is composed of several former British colonies conquered and settled during and very shortly after the 19th century, whose residents were British subjects. After these colonies were combined into the Union of South Africa and elevated as a Dominion within the British Empire in 1910, South Africa was granted more autonomy over time and gradually became independent from the United Kingdom. While South Africans are no longer British citizens, they continue to hold favoured status when residing in the UK; as Commonwealth citizens, South Africans are eligible to vote in UK elections and serve in public office there.

== Commonwealth citizenship ==
South African citizens have been Commonwealth citizens by default since 1 June 1994.

== Terminology ==
The distinction between the meaning of the terms citizenship and nationality is not always clear in the English language and differs by country. Generally, nationality refers a person's legal belonging to a nation state and is the common term used in international treaties when referring to members of a state; citizenship refers to the set of rights and duties a person has in that nation.

Historically, South African citizenship existed as a subsection within a wider British nationality (British subject status) applicable to all citizens of the British Empire and Commonwealth of Nations. The post-apartheid Constitution of South Africa avoids usage of the term "nationality" to sidestep possibilities of evoking ethnic connotations, but there is now little distinction between the two terms and they are used interchangeably in the modern context.

== Acquiring South African nationality ==
Nationality can be obtained in South Africa at birth or later in life through naturalisation.

=== By birth ===
Typically, in South Africa, a combination of jus sanguinis and jus soli are used to determine nationality at birth. Those who are eligible include:

- Children born anywhere who have at least one parent who is South African and the other parent is South African or a legal resident; or
- Persons born in the country who would otherwise be stateless, as long as their birth was registered with the authorities.

=== By naturalisation ===
Naturalisation can be granted to persons of majority who have resided in South Africa for a sufficient period of time to confirm they understand the official languages, customs and traditions of the country and the responsibilities of citizenship. General provisions are that applicants have good character and intend to remain in South Africa. Applicants must verify that they have been a permanent resident for five years and additionally resided in the country for a cumulative four years out of a previous eight-year period plus continuously in the year preceding the application. Besides foreigners meeting the criteria, other persons who may apply for naturalisation include:

- Children born in the territory, to foreigners who are legal residents, if they have resided in South Africa since birth, upon reaching majority;
- Minor children of a naturalised South African may be naturalised with their parent;
- Adoptees of South African nationals can acquire nationality upon completion of a legal adoption;
- The spouse of a South African national after a "prescribed period" of residency and provided they are approved for permanent residency; or (Note: Christine Hobden noted in a report prepared for the European University Institute that Section 26 of the Immigration Act requires a spouse to have five years of marriage and residence to gain permanent residency and further that the 1995 Regulations on the South African Citizenship Act require that a spouse have resided in the country for ten years without having an absence of more than ninety days in the five-year period immediately preceding a naturalisation application.)
- Persons who have exceptional circumstances may be naturalised without meeting requirements at the discretion of the Minister of Home Affairs.

== Loss of nationality ==
A South African who has dual nationality, or who intends to accept another nationality, can voluntarily renounce their South African nationality by registering their renunciation with the South African government.

A South African who has dual nationality, and who serves in the armed forces of the other country in a war against South Africa, loses their South African nationality automatically, unless they apply to the Minister of Home Affairs for permission to retain it. A naturalised South African automatically loses South African nationality if they serve in the armed forces of any other country in a war not supported by South Africa. The law formerly also provided that a South African who voluntarily acquired another nationality lost their South African nationality, unless they applied to the minister for permission to retain it. In 2025 the Constitutional Court struck this clause down as unconstitutional.

South African nationals can be denationalized by order of the Minister of Home Affairs under certain circumstances. Naturalisation as a South African may be revoked if it was obtained by fraud or contrary to the citizenship law. A dual national may be deprived of South African nationality if they are convicted of a crime with a prison sentence of more than a year, or if the minister finds it to be in the public interest to do so.

Persons who have previously lost their South African nationality may reacquire it by application to the Minister of Home Affairs if the reasons for the loss no longer exist or are of no consequence.

== Dual nationality ==
South Africa has allowed dual nationality since 1994 with restrictions. The Citizenship Act required citizens to apply for, and obtain, permission from the Minister of Home Affairs to retain their citizenship prior to acquiring the citizenship of another country via any voluntary and formal act (other than marriage) if over the age of majority, and failure to do so resulted in the automatic loss of South African citizenship upon acquiring another country's citizenship. On 6 May 2025 in the case of Democratic Alliance v Minister of Home Affairs the Constitutional Court struck down this law as inconsistent with the Constitution of South Africa and ordered the reinstatement of South African citizenship for those who lost their citizenship in this manner, confirming a 2023 decision of the Supreme Court of Appeal.

In addition, persons applying for naturalisation must prove that the country of their current nationality allows them to be dual nationals or they must renounce that nationality.

== History ==
=== Dutch colonial rule (1652–1814) ===
South African nationality began in 1652, when the Dutch East India Company established the first permanent European settlement in the Cape of Good Hope at Table Bay. At that time, pastoral groups known as the San and Khoikhoi inhabited the region. As the colony developed and expanded from 1658, slaves from other African regions as well as parts of South and Southeast Asia were imported to work in agriculture and in domestic service. During the 18th century, the growth in population of white settlers was nearly identical to increases in slave populations, despite the fact that the slaves were predominantly male. Conversion to Christianity was discouraged, because Dutch law in the period required slaves to be manumitted upon conversion. The law also barred white fathers from manumitting children with slave mothers, but did allow freedom to children born to white mothers and slave fathers.

From the time of the Dutch Republic (1588–1795), belonging was based on birth in a Dutch city or province and could be acquired through marriage or application for admission. Its successor state, the Batavian Republic, established that inhabitants in Dutch territory could acquire nationality by birth, and citizenship if they were born in Batavian territory and remained there for two years, or if they lived within the nation for ten years. From 1717, a law limited the immigration of European women to Africa, increasing the likelihood of slave women becoming concubines or wives of white colonists. The governmental form changed again in 1805, and in 1809 the Kingdom of Holland adopted the Napoleonic Code with adaptations for Holland. When the French Empire annexed the Dutch kingdom in 1810, the full French code was declared to apply to Dutch territory. Under its terms nationality was acquired at birth through descent from a father. Married women were legally incapacitated, making them legal dependents, and the nationality of a husband was automatically bestowed upon a wife.

=== British colonial rule and early period of the Union of South Africa (1814–1949) ===
While the Netherlands was attempting to regain its independence from France, Britain moved against Dutch overseas possessions, and formally acquired the Cape of Good Hope under the terms of the Convention of London in 1814. In 1824 traders from the Cape Colony first settled at Port Natal, the area was annexed in 1843, and the Natal Colony was established in 1844. Queen Adelaide Province was claimed by Britain in 1835, abandoned in 1837, re-annexed in 1847, and in 1864 was incorporated into the Cape Colony. The Orange Free State became a Crown Colony in 1848 as Transorangia, in 1854 it became independent as a Boer state, but reverted to crown rule in 1900. In 1852, Britain recognized the Boer state of the South African Republic, but in 1877, it was attached to Britain as the Transvaal Colony. Basutoland was annexed by Britain in 1868 and Griqualand West was claimed in 1872, which were incorporated into the Cape Colony, respectively in 1895 and 1880. Britain acquired Bechuanaland in 1885, and its territory south of the Molopo River was joined to the Cape Colony. In 1887, Zululand was annexed by Britain and in 1897 became part of Natal.

British Nationality Acts did not extend beyond the bounds of the United Kingdom of Great Britain and Ireland, meaning that under Britain's rules of conquest, laws in place at the time of acquisition remained in place until changed. As a new Civil Code for the Netherlands was not adopted until 1838, the law in place at acquisition in 1814 was the Napoleonic Code, meaning that nationality was defined by the relationship of a child or wife to their father or husband. In 1807, British involvement in the Atlantic slave trade was abolished. A decade later in 1817, Charles Henry Somerset, the Governor General of the Cape of Good Hope, issued a decree that foreigners could be granted a deed of burghership, after having lived in the colony for five years and taking an oath of allegiance. In 1833, the Parliament of the United Kingdom abolished slavery within its empire, establishing a four-year apprenticeship system in which slaves transitioned to full freedom. A large scale exodus from the Cape Colony of Dutch-speaking Free Burghers, known as Boers, and their slaves followed as a result of policies enacted by the British to protect indigenous people and newly emancipated slaves. Groups settled in the Natal, Transvaal, Transorangia, areas as well as northward into Bechuanaland (later part of South West Africa).

Further laws on naturalisation, which did not vary overmuch from the 1817 decree, were passed for the Cape Colony in 1856, 1861, and 1868, which were repealed by the consolidation and amendment of 22 August 1883. Under the 1883 Act, male foreigners could naturalise upon providing proof of good character and no record of conviction for serious crimes (or had been pardoned if he had a conviction) and taking an oath of allegiance. It also provided that foreign women who married a British subject of the colony, were considered to be a naturalized subject of the Cape Colony, as were minor children born within the colony to a naturalized parent. The 1883 Act was amended in 1889 and 1906. In 1897 an Immigration Restriction Act was passed for Natal, which provided that persons who were not allowed to enter the country included those who were illiterate, paupers, physically or mentally unfit or had contagious diseases, unpardoned felons, and prostitutes. A similar act was passed for the Cape Colony in 1902.

In 1909, the South Africa Act created the Union of South Africa and Britain officially transferred the Penguin Islands and Walvis Bay to South Africa. To standardise the requirements for naturalisation in the Cape Colony, Colony of Natal, Orange Free State and the Transvaal Colony, the Naturalisation of Aliens Act of 23 December 1910, replaced and repealed the individual acts of naturalisation which had previously been in place in those colonies. It allowed white foreigners of majority (twenty-one years old) who had resided in South Africa for two cumulative years out of the last five-year period to naturalise as British subjects, and based acquisition of nationality on the relationship to the male head of the family. In 1911, at the Imperial Conference a decision was made to draft a common nationality code for use across the empire. Other than common law, there was no standard statutory law which applied for subjects throughout the realm, meaning different jurisdictions created their own legislation for local conditions, which often conflicted with the laws in other jurisdictions in the empire. Thus, a person who was naturalised in Canada, for example, would be considered a foreigner, rather than a British national, in Australia or South Africa. In South Africa, from 1860 in the Colony of Natal and from 1861 in the Cape Colony, foreign husbands who married British wives could naturalise based on their wife's residency in the colony. In Natal, however, a husband also had to have had three children to naturalise and foreign wives who married British subjects automatically derived nationality from their spouse.

In 1911, proposed legislation was drafted in South Africa to bar Indian immigration and exclude undesirable Caucasian migrants. It was targeted to exclude indentured workers and Jewish immigrants. Eventually the Immigrants Regulation Act (Act No. 13) was passed in 1913, which prohibited migrant workers who originated north of the 22nd parallel south and established the basis for racial segregation, with only white persons able to immigrate. In effect, the law began the series of policies which would make native Africans non-citizen nationals of their country. The British Nationality and Status of Aliens Act 1914 allowed local jurisdictions in the self-governing territories to continue regulating nationality in their jurisdictions, but also established an imperial nationality scheme for use throughout the realm. Under its terms, common law provisions were reiterated for natural-born persons born within the realm on or after the effective date. By using the word person, the statute nullified legitimacy requirements for jus soli nationals, meaning an illegitimate child could derive nationality from its mother. For those born abroad on or after the effective date, legitimacy was still required, and could only be derived by a child from a British father (one generation), who was natural-born or naturalised. It also provided that a married woman derived her nationality from her spouse, meaning if he was British, she was also, and if he was foreign, so was she. It stipulated that upon loss of nationality of a husband, a wife could declare that she wished to remain British. It allowed that if a marriage had terminated, through death or divorce, a British-born national who had lost her status through marriage could reacquire British nationality through naturalisation without meeting a residency requirement. The statute specified that a five-year residency or service to the crown was required for naturalisation.

In 1914, the British government authorised South Africa to seize German South West Africa in exchange for territory in Luderitzbucht and Swakopmund. Germany surrendered the territory to the British on 9 July 1915 and it was occupied by the South African military until the war ended. At the 1919 Peace Conference of Versailles, Britain made it clear that it did not want direct control in administering South West Africa. When the mandate system was proposed, Britain agreed to the proposal with the intent of substituting its administration to South Africa. The Treaty of Peace and South West Africa Mandate Act 49 of 1919 established the local framework for the administration of South West Africa by South Africa. It was ratified in 1921 and in 1923, the Council of the League of Nations adopted a resolution that the administrator of a mandate could not confer nationality upon the native inhabitants, leaving them stateless. (Note: A commission was convened in 1946 to review nationality of the inhabitants in former German colonies. It concluded that inhabitants of mandates did not acquire nationality from the trustee and if they had been German nationals under the terms of the 1913 Nationality law, they became stateless when Germany abandoned its territories. According to D. P. O'Connell, they were deemed to be "lacking nationality but enjoying an administrative status analogous to that of inhabitants of British protectorates".) This was not the case for white settlers and South Africa granted the status of British subject to Germans residing in the territory from 1924.

In 1926, South Africa passed the British Nationality in the Union and Naturalisation and Status of Aliens Act. Under its terms, persons born in the territory, persons born abroad to a father who was a British subject, or persons born upon a British ship became British subjects. Additionally, persons who had resided or been employed by the Crown for an accumulated five years over an eight-year period, who were literate (in a language of South Africa), and intended to reside in the territory, were allowed to naturalise. Naturalisation or denaturalisation of a father automatically changed the status of his minor children. However, children who had been denaturalised could request reinstatement within one year of reaching majority. Widows who had originally been British subjects, whose foreign spouse had died, were also allowed to naturalise. Under the provisions of Chapter III, Section 12, foreign wives of British subjects automatically became British subjects upon marriage and British women who married foreign husbands automatically lost the status of British subject upon marriage.

The Union Nationality and Flags Act, 1927, as published in the Government Gazette Extraordinary.

The Union Nationality and Flags Act, no. 40 of 1927 (passed on 11 November 1927 and in operation on 31 May 1928), specified that British subjects residing in the territories of the Union of South Africa and any child born in the territory on or after 1 June 1928, who was not an alien or barred immigrant, were considered both Union nationals and British subjects. Also eligible to be Union nationals were British subjects who lived in the Union territory continuously for two years; persons who were naturalized British subjects, not prohibited from immigration, and had continuously had a domicile in South Africa for three years; persons born abroad to a father who was a Union national at the time of their birth; or the wife of a Union national. Women who married persons who were foreigners were not eligible to be Union nationals. Because natives of South West Africa were not British subjects under the rules of the mandate, they were also not allowed to become Union nationals. The Quota Act of 1930 was designed to supplement the 1913 Immigrants Regulation Act and established unlimited immigration from Commonwealth and Western European countries, but established maximum quotas for persons from other countries, like Russia and Eastern Europe. A further amendment to the Quota Act was adopted in 1933 which removed an exemption for skilled workers to take the literacy test. Under its terms, to prevent undesirable immigration, the country from which a person originated, rather than their nationality became the basis for exclusion.

In 1931, passage of the Statute of Westminster limited the powers of the Parliament of the United Kingdom to legislate on behalf of its Dominions — Australia, Canada, the Irish Free State, Newfoundland, New Zealand, and South Africa — declaring them all to be equal, self-governing states, united by their allegiance to Britain, with the authority for managing their own internal and external affairs. The Nationalisation and Amnesty Act of 1932 confirmed that those who had become Union nationals on or after the Union and Nationality and Flags Act of 1927 was effective and those who became residents after the effective date in 1932, were Union nationals. In 1937, the Aliens Act was passed as a successor to the Quota Act. Under its terms anyone who was not born as a British subject or Union national was considered foreign and subject to obtaining a residence permit. It established a set of racial categories, which included Asians, Blacks and Jews, who were prohibited immigrants. The Aliens Act was amended in 1939 by the Aliens and Immigration Bill which denied immigration for anyone who had Jewish parents and provided for deportation of undesirable foreigners as well as gave the state the ability to intervene in businesses owned by foreign proprietors.

At the end of World War II, South Africa made an official request to annex South West Africa. The request was denied by the United Nations, the successor to the League of Nations. Though there was strong opposition to incorporation among the native inhabitants of South West Africa, the South African government held a referendum and reported to the UN that the majority of South West Africans supported the proposal. Chiefs of the Damara, Herero, Nama and Ovambo peoples, protested directly to the British High Commissioner and led a campaign against annexation by South Africa. The British government supported annexation, but the UN rejected the proposal and instead designated the country as a Trust Territory. South Africa refused to accept the decision and launched a legal challenge to the UN jurisdiction. In 1950, the International Court of Justice ruled against South Africa confirming the lawful administration under the United Nations. In 1948, the policy of Apartheid was instituted through various legislation, which has had a lasting impact on statelessness for many persons who were native or descended from South West Africans, as birth registration was not mandatory or routine.

=== Independent Commonwealth country (1949–1961) ===
On 1 January 1949, South Africa became an independent country within the British Commonwealth of Nations. In 1949, South Africa promulgated the Citizenship Act 44, which automatically conferred Union nationality, in Sections 2 and 5 upon persons born or descended from South Africans, and in Section 2.2, upon the inhabitants who had been born in South West Africa on 2 September 1949, the date the act became operable. It specifically included those persons who had previously been stateless as defined by the mandate. Under its terms, persons who had previously been British nationals, including their wives who had previously been British subjects, or persons who were born or legally domiciled the Union or in South West Africa were considered Union nationals. For those born after the effective date of the statue, nationality was derived at birth by being born in the territory to a father who was neither an enemy alien, prohibited immigrant, nor who had diplomatic immunity; or born abroad to a father who was born in South Africa or South West Africa, or to a father who was naturalised as South African; and could only be acquired through a South African mother if the child was illegitimate. Commonwealth citizens were allowed to obtain nationality through registration after a cumulative residency of four years over a six-year period. Naturalisation required a literacy in a language of the Union, evidence of no confinement for offences or mental illness, and proof of a cumulative residency of five years over a seven-year period. Wives of South Africans who were lawful residents for three years were able to naturalise. Women gained independent nationality under the 1949 statute. In 1960, Ethiopia and Libya instituted proceedings in the International Court of Justice against South Africa for breaching their obligations toward South West Africa under their trusteeship, but were found not to have standing.

=== Apartheid republic (1961–1991) ===
On 31 May 1961, the Union of South Africa left the Commonwealth and became the Republic of South Africa. The South African Citizenship Amendment Act (No. 64) of 1961, reiterated that under the new Republic, South West Africans continued to be South African nationals. The South Africa Act 1962 provided that persons who had been British subjects by virtue of Union nationality were no longer British; however, transitional provisions gave persons until 1 January 1966 to register as British nationals under the British Nationality Act 1948 if they met the criteria for British registration. From 1962, the United Nations supported the independence movement and sought solutions to bring about independence for South West Africa. On 27 October 1966, the United Nations revoked (GA resolution 2145 (XXI)) the trusteeship of South Africa over South West Africa. Britain did not accept the revocation by the United Nations, but admitted that South Africa had violated the terms of its administration. The revocation was upheld by the International Court of Justice. On 19 May 1967, the United Nations General Assembly passed resolution 2248 establishing administration for the territory by the United Nations Council for South West Africa and the following year officially renamed the territory Namibia. Despite international pressure and a ruling by the International Court of Justice in 1971 that South Africa's continuing occupation of Namibia was illegal, South Africa remained opposed to Namibia's independence.

In 1970, the Bantu Homelands Citizenship Act (No. 26, later the National States Citizenship Act and from 1978 the Black States Citizenship Act) was passed by the South African government. (Note: Though South Africa also created Homelands in Namibia in 1970– East Caprivi, Kavangoland, and Ovamboland — they were security districts which were occupied by the South African Defence Force. They were not independent, had limited governing authority, and by 1979, the Namibian homelands were placed under martial law.) The purpose of these laws was to denaturalise all Black South Africans in the country and assign them to ethnically categorized zones, which would become independent, thereby forcing them into becoming nationals of those in homelands. The initial 1970 Act Section three did not immediately deprive Black people of South African nationality, but assigned them to live in ten specific territories — Bophuthatswana, Ciskei, Gazankulu, KaNgwane, KwaNdebele, KwaZulu, Lebowa, QwaQwa, Transkei, and Venda — by birth, cultural affiliation, or domicile, disregarding current residence. An amendment in 1971 presented the homelands with constitutions, and by 1974, when Transkei opted for independence, denaturalization became embedded in the idea to grant independence to the homelands. In a bid for international recognition of each homeland gaining independence, nationality was extended to each Transkieian in 1976. International recognition was not forthcoming and a resolution of the United Nations General Assembly condemned the process of arbitrarily transferring nationality. South Africa ignored the international outcry, granting independence to Bophuthatswana in 1977, Venda in 1979, and Ciskei in 1981. Despite insistence that the homelands were independent, they remained financial dependents of the South African government. The action resulted in the Black population becoming stateless foreigners in South Africa with no rights, beyond those granted by their varied homelands.

In 1973, the Aliens Control Act restricted both mobility and employment options of all non-citizens. That year a Citizenship Amendment Act (No. 41) was passed granting the Minister of the Interior the authority without any appeal mechanism to strip any South African of their nationality if they held dual nationality. Because foreigners were evading military service, the Citizenship Act was amended (No. 53) in 1978, to require that alien residents under twenty-five would be automatically conferred nationality after two years residency and be eligible to complete their national service. Anyone who refused to become South African was immediately deprived of their residency permit. The Citizenship Act was amended (No. 30) in 1980 to make permanent denationalisations of some South Africans. In 1981, nationality statutes were amended (Act No. 95) to grant South African nationality to the illegitimate children of mothers who were not prohibited immigrants and had established permanent residency, if the child was adopted by a South African and to allow wives and the guardians of minor children to decline being automatically naturalised with their husband or father. Shortfalls in military service again resulted in an amendment of the Citizenship Act (No. 43) in 1984, which modified the terms of the 1978 Act, indirectly making permanent residents liable to military service (even though this is not explicitly mentioned) by mandating automatic naturalisation after five years of ordinary residence.

Between 1984 and 1988, negotiations between the United Nations, international actors, and South Africa focused on setting a timetable for Namibian independence. In 1986, the Restoration of South African Citizenship Act (No. 73) was passed repatriating those nationals who had lost their nationality when Bophuthatswana, Ciskei, Transkei, and Venda had been declared foreign states. Under provisions of the law, persons in those homelands could acquire nationality by birth, descent, naturalisation, or registration. To acquire nationality from birth one had to prove their affiliation to one of the homelands, prove that they had been born in South Africa prior to the independence of the homeland, and prove that they had lost their South African nationality. If they had left their homeland, they also had to verify that they were permanent residents in South Africa. For nationality by descent, a person had to have been born in one of the homelands to a person who qualified for restoration of their nationality from birth, and be a South African permanent resident. Nationality by registration required that an applicant be sixteen years old or more; a citizen of an independent homeland, who was South African prior to the creation of the independent state; and a lawful permanent resident; or an unmarried minor child whose parent qualified for restored nationality at birth. Obtaining nationality by registration was at the sole discretion of the Director General of the Department of Home Affairs. For restoration of nationality by naturalisation, provisions required that applicants were either born in a white portion South Africa prior to creation of the independent homelands, or after their creation in the homeland; that their parents were born in South Africa or in an independent homeland; or if a female who was a lawful permanent resident of South Africa, that she be the wife or widow of a South African, whose marriage and residency had continued for at least two years in the immediate period prior to submitting an application. The complexity of requirements and basis on permanent residency, allowed very limited numbers of people to reacquire nationality.

Organized campaigns in Europe and the United States called for economic sanctions against South Africa and urged multinational enterprises to withdraw from doing business in the country. As the measures began to impact the economy, internal unrest and boycotts began. Finally bowing to internal rebellion and international pressure South Africa agreed to begin the process of dismantalling Apartheid and in December 1988, approved a plan for Namibian. In 1990, South Africa passed series of statutes regarding Namibia, they included Act 34 which recognized Namibia's independence, Act 74 which withdrew South African nationality from persons who gained Namibian nationality at independence, and Act 112 which modified the applicability of South African law to Namibia. A constitution for Namibia was drafted and adopted on 9 February 1990. In 1991, the Citizenship Act was amended (No. 70) to remove marital status, and thus legitimacy, as a criterion for obtaining nationality. The new language stated that acquisition of nationality was based on having a South African parent.

=== Post-Apartheid republic (1991–present) ===
The last Apartheid law was abolished on 17 June 1991 and in November the government hosted the Convention for a Democratic South Africa aimed at drafting a new constitution Although negotiations broke down in 1992, they resumed in 1993 and produced an interim constitution by the end of November which defined the constitutional principles for citizenship and established voting rules for the 1994 elections. As part of ensuring suffrage and because of the failure to restore nationality and citizenship rights to persons in the homelands, in 1993, the Restoration and Extension of South African Citizenship Act (No. 196) was passed. Under its terms, persons who had formerly had citizenship in the homelands could naturalise in South Africa. On 1 June 1994, South Africa rejoined the Commonwealth of Nations. The homelands were formally abolished 1994 and the final provisions of independence for the homelands were repealed in 1995 with the passage of a new Citizenship Act (No. 88). The overall nationality scheme did not change dramatically. It provided that prior legislation was repealed, nationality and citizenship were acquired through equal entitlement, dual nationality was accepted, and children who were stateless were granted nationality. The statute changed the discriminatory provisions of the 1993 Restoration Act, which required naturalisation, to automatically grant nationality and citizenship to those who had formerly held homeland citizenship. It also made minor changes to the requirements for naturalisation and the oath of allegiance, but to naturalise, a foreigner still had to satisfy conditions that they were legal permanent residents, met specific residency requirements, and intended to continue to live in South Africa. Finally it established that persons could lose their nationality for committing certain crimes, for obtaining dual nationality or working for a foreign state or military without authorisation, for fraud in a naturalisation application, or for voting or using a passport of another country.

After the elections a Constitutional Assembly was called and after consultation and review by the Constitutional Court, a final constitution was approved by the assembly on 11 October 1996. Under its terms, Section 3 provided that all South Africans had a right to equally acquire nationality and citizenship and that such provisions would be contained in the Citizenship Act. In 2007, the 1995 Citizenship Act was amended (Act No. 69) to clarify that persons who had been registered or naturalised in the Homelands were also automatically granted South African nationality and citizenship. It also granted the Minister responsible for naturalisation to grant certificates at his discretion under exceptional circumstance to applicants who did not meet the typical requirements to naturalise. In 2004, an amendment to the Citizenship Act (No. 17) removed the clause that a national could lose their nationality for voting in another country or using a foreign passport. It was modified again in 2010 (Act No. 17) with changed provisions from automatic acquisition of nationality at birth for children who had one parent who was a legal resident or citizen to require that one parent must be South African and the other a lawful permanent resident or also South African. It allowed children born in South Africa to foreign parents to apply for naturalisation upon reaching majority, as long as the birth had been registered. Refining the provisions for dual nationality, the amendment required applicants for naturalisation to prove they were from a country that allowed them to hold other nationality or they were required to renounce their other nationality. It also added a provision that naturalised persons could lose their nationality if they participated in a war that South Africa did not support.

== See also ==
- Black Homeland Citizenship Act
- Citizenship
- History of South African citizenship
