= Ismail Mahomed =

Chief Justice of South Africa from 1997 to 2000

Ismail Mahomed SCOB, SC

Chief Justice of South Africa
- In office 1 January 1997 – 17 June 2000
- Appointed by: Nelson Mandela
- Deputy: Hennie van Heerden
- Preceded by: Michael Corbett
- Succeeded by: Arthur Chaskalson

Deputy President of the Constitutional Court
- In office 14 February 1995 – 31 December 1996
- Appointed by: Nelson Mandela
- President: Arthur Chaskalson
- Preceded by: Court established
- Succeeded by: Pius Langa

Judge of the Supreme Court
- In office 11 August 1991 – 13 February 1995
- Appointed by: F. W. de Klerk

Personal details
- Born: 5 July 1931 Pretoria, Transvaal, Union of South Africa
- Died: 17 June 2000 (aged 68) Johannesburg, Gauteng, South Africa
- Spouse: Hawo Mahomed
- Relations: Ismail Ayob (cousin)
- Education: Witwatersrand University

Ismail Mahomed SCOB SC (5 July 1931 – 17 June 2000) was a South African lawyer and jurist who served as the first non-white Chief Justice of South Africa from January 1997 until his death in June 2000. He was also the Chief Justice of Namibia from 1992 to 1999 and the inaugural Deputy President of the Constitutional Court of South Africa from 1995 to 1996.

Born in Pretoria to Indian Memon immigrant parents hailing from Ranavav, Mahomed practiced as an advocate in Johannesburg during apartheid, becoming reputed as one of South Africa's foremost litigators in civil rights law and administrative law. In 1974, he became the first non-white advocate to take silk in South Africa. Although apartheid precluded him from judicial appointment in South Africa, he was a judge of appeal in neighbouring Swaziland from 1979 and in neighbouring Lesotho from 1982. He was the co-chairperson of the Convention for a Democratic South Africa in 1991.

Also in 1991, as the negotiations to end apartheid accelerated, Mahomed was appointed as the first non-white judge of the Supreme Court of South Africa. He was elevated to the Constitutional Court when it was established in 1995, but after two years he returned to the Supreme Court's Appellate Division, newly re-constituted as the Supreme Court of Appeal. His appointment as Chief Justice of the new court, spearheaded by President Nelson Mandela, was a point of controversy among the white legal establishment, but he led the appellate court until his death from pancreatic cancer.

== Early life and education ==
Mahomed was born on 5 July 1931 in Pretoria. The son of devoutly Muslim Indian Memon immigrants, with a tradesman father, he was the eldest of six children and was classified as Indian under apartheid. After matriculating in 1950 at the Pretoria Indian Boys' High School, he moved to Johannesburg to enrol at the University of the Witwatersrand, where he was one of a small group of non-white students. He completed a BA in 1953, an Honours in political science with distinction in 1954, and an LLB in 1957.

At university, Mahomed was active in the student representative council and in the anti-apartheid Transvaal Indian Congress. Richard Goldstone later said that he had adopted Mahomed as "my hero" after hearing him address a gathering of student activists on the campus.

== Legal career ==
In 1957, newly graduated, Mahomed was admitted as an advocate; because the Pretoria Bar was reserved for white lawyers, he joined the Johannesburg Bar, where he practiced for the next three decades. However, under the Group Areas Act, Mahomed was prohibited from opening his own office in the Bar Chambers in Johannesburg's central business district; thus, in his own words, he was driven to "squat" in the building, borrowing his colleagues' chambers, meeting clients in the library, and eating lunch alone in vacant rooms or on the pavement. He later described the experience as "agonizing". It continued until the mid-1970s, when a white advocate intervened to obtain a special governmental dispensation allowing Mahomed his own room in chambers. Five years later, in September 1974, Mahomed became the first non-white advocate to take silk in South Africa, after which his white colleagues invited him to lunch in the common room. However, throughout his career, the Group Areas Act banned Mahomed from staying overnight in the Orange Free State, meaning that he had to leave and re-enter the province daily whenever he argued a case before the Supreme Court's Appellate Division in Bloemfontein.

Because he specialised in administrative law and civil rights law, Mahomed frequently appeared in litigation on behalf of opponents of the apartheid state and apartheid legislation. In addition to leading civil challenges against Group Areas Act removals and other executive decrees, he was defence counsel in a number of criminal political trials, including the major Pietermaritzburg Treason Trial of 16 United Democratic Front leaders. His other activist clients included Zwelakhe Sisulu and Penuell Maduna, who said that Mahomed "was that kind of character who actually places issues of justice before the judge, the justice of the cause of the people fighting apartheid before the judge". David Beresford later described Mahomed as "essentially, a conservative", driven to anti-establishment civil rights law by the apartheid context; indeed, Sydney Kentridge, Mahomed's frequent co-counsel, said that Mahomed "truly loved the law and its distortions under the apartheid regime were a matter not only of justified indignation, but of real pain for him".

Outside of South Africa, Mahomed was admitted as an advocate in the neighbouring Commonwealth countries of Lesotho, Botswana, Swaziland, and Zimbabwe, and he was admitted to the Bar of England and Wales in 1984. He was also a founding trustee of the Legal Resources Centre, and he authored several law journal articles and a book, with Lewis Dison, on the Group Areas Act.

== Judicial career ==
=== Courts in other countries: 1979–1999 ===
Although apartheid precluded Mahomed from judicial appointment in South Africa, he was appointed as a judge of appeal in neighbouring Swaziland in 1979 and in neighbouring Lesotho in 1982. After Namibia gained its independence from South Africa in 1990, he became an acting judge in that country, hearing such cases as S v Acheson; he was involved in drafting Namibia's post-independence Constitution, and he ultimately served as the second Chief Justice of Namibia from 1992 to 1999. He also served a stint as president of the Lesotho Court of Appeal.

=== Supreme Court: 1991–1995 ===
On 11 August 1991, amid the negotiations to end apartheid, Mahomed was appointed as a judge of the Supreme Court of South Africa. He was South Africa's first non-white judge. In December 1991, he and Judge Piet Schabort were co-chairpersons of the multi-party Convention for a Democratic South Africa. From 1993, he was an acting judge in the Supreme Court's Appellate Division, at the time the highest bench in the country.

=== Constitutional Court: 1995–1996 ===
On 14 February 1995, Mahomed was among the 11 judges sworn in to the inaugural bench of the Constitutional Court of South Africa, which was newly established under the Interim Constitution. On the appointment of President Nelson Mandela, he served as the court's inaugural Deputy President, deputising President Arthur Chaskalson. He was also the chairperson of the South African Law Reform Commission from 1996.

During his short tenure in the Constitutional Court, Mahomed authored six majority judgments: S v Mhlungu, Premier of KwaZulu-Natal v President, Shabalala v Attorney-General of the Transvaal, In re: Gauteng School Education Bill of 1995, AZAPO v President, and Fraser v Children's Court, Pretoria North. Sydney Kentridge said of the AZAPO v President judgment, on the constitutionality of the post-apartheid Truth and Reconciliation Commission, that it exemplified Mahomed's "sensitive appreciation of the balance to be struck between individual rights and the needs of society as a whole" and that it "should be compulsory reading for all students of constitutional law".

=== Chief Justice of South Africa: 1997–2000 ===
==== Appointment ====
In 1996, as Michael Corbett's retirement approached, President Mandela indicated publicly that Mahomed was his preferred candidate to succeed Corbett as Chief Justice of South Africa. Although Mahomed's nomination was supported by the Black Lawyers Association and National Association of Democratic Lawyers, it was vociferously opposed by an overwhelming majority of senior judges; the Mail & Guardian reported that he had the support of only one of the sitting judges of appeal, his personal friend Ralph Zulman, and of a minority of the High Court Judge Presidents. Instead, operating on a principle of seniority, a large number of judges nominated Judge of Appeal Hennie van Heerden for the position; indeed, van Heerden's colleague, Judge of Appeal Joos Hefer, called publicly for Mahomed to withdraw from the contest out of "honour". The controversy was compared to a similar saga four decades earlier when L. C. Steyn had been elevated over his more senior colleague, Oliver Schreiner.

Nonetheless, after the Judicial Service Commission interviewed Mahomed and van Heerden in Cape Town in late 1996, Mandela confirmed Mahomed's appointment with effect from 1 January 1997.

==== Activities ====
As Chief Justice, Mahomed was the head of the Appellate Division, which was reconstituted as the Supreme Court of Appeal under the 1996 Constitution; he participated in interviews to find a successor to his seat on the Constitutional Court, which was ultimately filled by Zak Yacoob. According to commentators, Mahomed was an "important bridge" between the Constitutional Court and the Supreme Court, keeping offices on Constitution Hill in Braamfontein as well as in Bloemfontein. Indeed, he reportedly supported the proposal – also mooted by Justice Minister Penuell Maduna (Mahomed's former client) – to merge the two apex courts under the Office of the Chief Justice.

Mahomed was also viewed as a champion of the post-apartheid transformation of the judiciary; judicial diversity became a consideration for judicial appointments by the Judicial Service Commission, which Mahomed headed, but he was also heralded for viewing transformation as a matter of progressive jurisprudence, as well as diversified demographics. However, observers generally agreed that the Supreme Court remained a conservative and white-dominated institution throughout Mahomed's tenure, and, at the time of his death in 2000, he remained the only non-white member of the Supreme Court bench.

==== Illness and succession ====
By February 2000, Mahomed was seriously ill with pancreatic cancer and took leave from the bench, with his deputy, Hennie van Heerden, acting as Chief Justice in his stead. He was hospitalised intermittently thereafter and died on 17 June 2000 at Linksfield Park Clinic in Johannesburg. He was buried in Pretoria West; his funeral was attended by South African President Thabo Mbeki. On behalf of the Supreme Court, acting Chief Justice van Heerden apologised posthumously to Mahomed for the discriminatory treatment he had received during apartheid.

After Mahomed's death, a delay in appointing his successor led to rumours that the government had revived its proposal to restructure the apex courts. In November 2001, Parliament passed the Sixth Amendment of the Constitution of South Africa, which renamed the judicial leadership positions: Constitutional Court President Chaskalson became the Chief Justice of South Africa, and the Supreme Court of Appeal was henceforth led by its own President.

== Awards and honours ==
Mahomed received honorary doctorates in law from the University of Delhi, University of Pennsylvania, University of Natal, University of Pretoria, and University of Cape Town; he was also an honorary professor of law at his alma mater, the University of the Witwatersrand, and at Columbia University. In July 2000, he was posthumously awarded the Bar Council's inaugural Sydney and Felicia Kentridge Award for excellence in public law, and he was posthumously awarded the Order of the Baobab in Gold in 2002. There is a statue in his honour at the Supreme Court of Namibia, and Justice Mahomed street in Brooklyn, Pretoria is named in his honour.

== Personal life ==
He lived in Johannesburg with his wife, Hawo Mahomed (née Bava).

Legal offices
Preceded by Michael Corbett	Chief Justice of South Africa; 1998–2000	Succeeded by Arthur Chaskalson
