= Recognition of same-sex unions in Namibia =

Same-sex marriage is not performed in Namibia. On 16 May 2023, the Supreme Court ruled 4–1 that same-sex marriages concluded outside of Namibia should be recognised for residency purposes. A bill seeking to overturn the ruling and criminalise advocacy for same-sex marriage passed the Parliament of Namibia in September 2023, but was not signed into law by President Nangolo Mbumba. Nevertheless, Mbumba signed a new marriage law in October 2024 that explicitly defines marriage in heterosexual terms.

== Background ==
The Marriage Act (Act 25 of 1961), (Note: In the national languages of Namibia: Ovambo: Oveta yOndjokana; Khoekhoe: ǃGameb ǂHanumās; Afrikaans: Huwelikswet, pronounced [ˈɦyvələksˌvɛt]; Herero: Oveta yOrukupo; Kwangali: Veta zoNonkwara; Lozi: Mulao wa Linyalo; German: Ehegesetz, pronounced [ˈeːəɡəˌzɛts]; Tswana: Molao wa Manyalo) enacted by the Parliament of South Africa when Namibia was still South West Africa, did not explicitly prohibit the recognition of same-sex marriages or define marriage. However, it generally referred to married spouses as "husband" and "wife". When Namibia became independent in 1990, it retained all South African laws unless explicitly repealed or modified by new legislation. In 2024, the Parliament of Namibia enacted the Marriage Act (Act 14 of 2024), which contains an explicit prohibition on marriages between people of the same sex. As same-sex marriages and civil unions are not performed in Namibia, same-sex couples do not have access to the legal rights, benefits and obligations of marriage, including protection from domestic violence, adoption rights, tax benefits and inheritance rights, among others. However, couples can ensure that property is divided fairly upon dissolution of the relationship or death of one partner by signing a written contract and a will. The contract must include an agreement of mutual duty of support and information on which partner owns what property and how it should be divided upon separation.

The Constitution of Namibia does not explicitly permit same-sex marriages. Article 14(1) states that men and women of marriageable age may enter into marriage irrespective of their race, colour, religion, ethnicity, creed, social or economic status, or nationality. Furthermore, men and women are entitled to the same rights and obligations, whether during the marriage or at its dissociation. Article 14(3) places the family as the "natural and fundamental unit of society", entitled to special protection by the State. Article 14(2) states:

Marriage shall be entered into only with the free and full consent of the intending spouses.

Ombudsman John Walters expressed support for same-sex marriage in August 2016. SWAPO, the ruling party since independence, is opposed to same-sex marriage. When Yvonne Dausab became the Minister of Justice in 2020, the SWAPO-led government softened its position on LGBT rights, suggesting that the cabinet discuss scrapping the sodomy law. Of the other parties represented in the Parliament, the Christian Democratic Voice (CDV) and the Namibian Economic Freedom Fighters (NEFF) are staunchly opposed to same-sex marriage. The Popular Democratic Movement (PDM) is ambivalent on the issue.

== Court cases ==
Same-sex sexual activity legal Same-sex marriage Limited recognition (foreign residency rights) No recognition of same-sex couples Same-sex sexual activity illegal Prison but not enforced Prison Death penalty on books but not enforced Enforced death penalty

=== Chairperson of the Immigration Selection Board v Frank and Another ===
In the late 1990s, Elizabeth Khaxas and her German partner Erna Elizabeth Frank sued to have their lesbian relationship recognised in Namibia. Namibian law grants residency and citizenship to foreign nationals who marry Namibian citizens. However, as the couple's same-sex relationship was not recognised by law, Frank could not obtain permanent residency or citizenship. She applied for a permanent residence permit with the Immigration Selection Board twice, in 1996 and 1997. The Board rejected the application both times. The High Court ruled in favor of the couple in 1998, directing the Board to issue a residence permit to Frank. The Board appealed the decision to the Supreme Court. In Chairperson of the Immigration Selection Board v Frank and Another on 5 March 2001, the Supreme Court held that:

Homosexual relationship[s], whether between men and men and women and women, clearly fall outside the scope and intent of Article 14 [of the Constitution of Namibia].

While the court ruled that Frank should be granted a permanent residence permit, which she received a year later, it did not rule in favour of recognising same-sex relationships by law.

=== Digashu and Seiler-Lilles cases ===
==== Proceedings and ruling ====
In December 2017, Johann Potgieter and his South African husband Matsobane Daniel Digashu filed a lawsuit in the High Court, Digashu v Government of the Republic of Namibia, to have their marriage recognised in Namibia. The couple had married in South Africa in 2015, but Digashu was not recognised as Potgieter's spouse by the Namibian Government, causing several legal and bureaucratic problems as he could not receive permanent residency or citizenship, as is granted to married opposite-sex partners. In January 2018, officials granted the couple's application to allow Digashu and their son to enter Namibia, as the High Court continued to review their case. Another case, Seiler-Lilles v Government of the Republic of Namibia, was filed in 2018 by Anette Seiler-Liles and her German wife Anita Seiler-Lilles, together since 1988. The couple argued that their 2017 German marriage should be recognized in Namibia.

In June 2019, Judge President Petrus Damaseb directed that a full bench of three judges should be designated to hear all pending cases. In September 2019, the couples agreed to consolidate their lawsuits. Judges Hannelie Prinsloo, Orben Sibeya and Esi Schimming-Chase heard oral arguments in the combined court case on 20 May 2021. The couples asked the court to recognise their marriages performed outside of Namibia. Senior counsel Raymond Heathcote, representing the plaintiffs, argued that the case would not legalise same-sex marriage in Namibia but sought to recognise marriages performed elsewhere. He argued that the Constitution gives men and women the right to marry without limitation due to their social status, and that discrimination based on sexual orientation is discrimination on the basis of sex and social status, two grounds on which the Constitution forbids all discrimination. A judgment was issued on 20 January 2022. The judges agreed in principle with the plaintiffs, but ruled that they were bound by the 2001 case of Chairperson of the Immigration Selection Board v Frank and Another and as a result could not rule in favour of same-sex marriage. The judges encouraged the couples to appeal to the Supreme Court to have its previous ruling overturned. Judge Prinsloo said, "Only the Supreme Court can correct itself", adding that "it [is] high time the constitution reflect[s] social reality". The couples said they were "disappointed" with the decision but would consider an appeal to the Supreme Court. Lawyer Carli Schlickerling, representing the plaintiffs, said, "The court said to us this morning, 'look, we want to help you, we believe that you should be succeeding on the constitutional issues'. It seems that the court is setting out to the Supreme Court why we should succeed on appeal."

The Supreme Court heard oral arguments on 3 March 2023. On 16 May 2023, it ruled 4–1 that, due to constitutional guarantees of equality and dignity, the government must recognise same-sex marriages concluded outside of Namibia for residency purposes. It also commented on its 2001 decision, stating that its previous remarks on same-sex relationships were "peripheral and subsidiary remarks not necessary for that decision and thus [...] not binding". In their majority opinion, justices Peter Shivute, Dave Smuts, Petrus Damaseb and Elton Hoff wrote:

We accordingly conclude that the approach of the Ministry to exclude spouses, including Mr Digashu and Ms Seiler-Lilles, in a validly concluded same-sex marriage from the purview of s 2(1) of the Act [Immigration Control Act] infringes both their interrelated rights to dignity and equality. They are spouses for the purpose of s 2(1)(c) of the Act, given their validly concluded marriages in South Africa and Germany respectively. The term 'spouse' in s 2(1)(c) is thus to be interpreted to include same-sex spouses lawfully married in another country. It is not necessary for an order to the effect that those words are to be read into the term 'spouse' because the interpretation to be given to the term 'spouse' by this Court in complying with the Constitution is to include same-sex spouses lawfully married in another country.

==== Reactions and subsequent changes ====
The ruling was welcomed by the plaintiff couples. Digashu said he was "overwhelmed", and highlighted the support of the Southern Africa Litigation Centre and civil society organisations in Namibia. Siegliende Wether, the president of the Khorixas Constituency Residents Association, also welcomed the ruling: "We all are God's creation, and nobody should be lesser than another. Namibia has to live up to a just and equal society as the Constitution emphasises." However, the ruling was fiercely opposed by religious groups and politicians. The Council of Churches in Namibia released a statement calling on legislators to ban same-sex marriage, describing it as "contrary to Namibian culture".

On 11 July 2023, the National Assembly passed legislation introduced by MP Jerry Ekandjo, seeking to overturn the court ruling. The bill aimed to define marriage as the "union between persons of the opposite sex" and define a spouse as "one half of a legal union between a genetically born man and genetically born woman". Further, it would have made celebrating, witnessing, promoting or propagating a same-sex marriage a criminal offence punishable with up to six years' imprisonment and fines of up to N$100,000 ($5,500), which opponents of the bill described as a "clear violation of freedom of speech". It is unclear how the bill would have legally overturned the court ruling, as the Supreme Court ruled that the constitutional principle of equality guarantees recognition of same-sex marriages performed abroad, and the bill was not a constitutional amendment. If challenges had been filed against the law, it would likely have been struck down as unconstitutional. MP McHenry Venaani said, "I have not seen bills written deliberately (to) contradict judgments. I am not sure it would pass the test of constitutionality". The bill was passed by the National Council on 19 July 2023. Hage Geingob, who served as president until his death in February 2024, stated his opposition to same-sex marriage in July 2023 but expressed "caution" about the bill's constitutionality. MP Daniel Kashikola also expressed concern about the bill's implications for customary marriages and intersex people. Equal Namibia, an LGBT advocacy group, said it would file a lawsuit challenging the bill if Mbumba were to sign it into law. Omar van Reenen, campaign manager for the organisation, said, "[This bills is] wholly unconstitutional and will fail in court. But it proved that this is a legislature which is hell-bent on violating their oath of office for cheap campaign points". In June 2024, activists launched a campaign urging President Nangolo Mbumba to veto the legislation. In March 2025, Minister of Presidential Affairs Christine ǁHoebes announced that Mbumba would not sign the bill into law "because it was not passed by a two-thirds majority in Parliament and could be challenged on constitutional grounds".

On 11 July 2024, the National Assembly passed legislation defining marriage as "a legal union between two persons of the opposite sex". However, this bill did not contain provisions criminalising advocacy for same-sex marriage. It passed the National Council on 29 July, and was signed into law by Mbumba on 2 October as the Marriage Act, 2024. The law was published in the Government Gazette on 30 December. In January 2025, van Reenen said, "Instead of enacting bills to alleviate poverty and ensure 60% of Namibians that live in shacks are housed, President Mbumba's legacy will be tainted by bending to state-sanctioned homophobia and signing an unconstitutional bill into law. It will be challenged in court". John Nakuta, a scholar at the University of Namibia, said:

We need to remember that Article 14 of the Namibian Constitution, which is the supreme law of our land, endows men and women of full age, in other word, mature men and women, with the right to marry and a right to find a family. The new Marriage Act now officially restricts the right to marry and the right to find a family to only heterosexual couples. In fact, the parliamentarians and the law in this case even went to the extent of saying that even if a same-sex marriage was lawfully contracted in another country, that same-sex marriage will now also not be recognised in Namibia in terms of the new Marriage Act. Very worryingly, that provision overrides the Supreme Court's ruling of last year as it relates to the couples married in South Africa and in Germany, whose same-sex marriages are legally recognised. […] I can associate with whoever I want to associate with. [Whether] a person of my same sex; it is my right to choose, and no one can decide. […] The freedom of choice, and so forth, and one can go on, but most importantly, it goes to the very crux of human dignity, not to allow people to be who they are and want to be.

In June 2025, the organization Equal Namibia said it was searching for potential litigants to challenge the new ban in court. It also submitted proposals for the introduction of same-sex marriage and legal gender recognition based on self-determination for transgender individuals to the Ministry of Justice and Labour Relations. In September 2026, Justice Minister Fillemon Wise Immanuel clarified that the new marriage law was still not "operationalised", as the Ministries of Home Affairs and Immigration, and Justice and Labour Relations were still reviewing the regulations required for its implementation.

=== Grobler v Minister of Home Affairs and Immigration ===
In 2018, lawyer Anita Grobler from Otjiwarongo and her South African spouse Susan Jacobs, together for over 25 years, filed a lawsuit in the High Court to have their 2009 South African marriage recognized in Namibia and to obtain residency rights for Jacobs. The Minister of Home Affairs and Immigration was named as the principal defendant in the lawsuit. The Immigration Selection Board decided on 25 July 2019 to approve Jacobs' application for a permanent residence permit. She made the required payment of N$18,000 for the permit, but as of October 2019 it had still not been issued to her. The couple agreed to consider a settlement agreement and the withdrawal of their lawsuit once the residence permit was issued.

=== Lühl v Minister of Home Affairs and Immigration ===
In October 2021, High Court Judge Thomas Masuku ruled that the son of a same-sex couple, Mexican national Guillermo Delgado and Namibian national Phillip Lühl, born via surrogacy in South Africa, was a Namibian citizen by descent. The Supreme Court overturned the decision in March 2023, holding that the High Court had "gone astray" in granting citizenship to the child; "Since the birth was not registered in accordance with the Citizenship Act, the High Court was not competent to grant relief."

In March 2022, Supreme Court Chief Justice Peter Shivute ordered the Ministry of Home Affairs to re-evaluate the application for residency of Delgado. Despite the narrow scope of the ruling, activist Ndilokelwa Nthetwa welcomed the decision, "The couple themselves, this impacts them and not necessarily for the community, but it is a win in the way that the Supreme Court has recognized that the ministry has abused public policy (trust) to treat this couple and their family in a very inhumane and hostile manner".

== Historical and customary recognition ==
While many modern-day Namibian cultures historically practiced polygamy, there are no records of same-sex marriages being performed in local cultures in the way they are commonly defined in Western legal systems. However, there is evidence for identities and behaviours that may be placed on the LGBT spectrum. Early Europeans to visit modern-day Namibia, including anthropologists, ethnologists and priests, reported "same-sex marriage ceremonies" among the Ovambo, Nama, Herero and Himba. German anthropologist Kurt Falk reported in the 1920s that "the Ovambos' habitual tribal custom supports same-sex relationships, and so almost every Ovambo has engaged in homosexual intercourse." Ethnologist Carlos Estermann mentioned that there were people fulfilling a third gender role in Ovambo society, known as kimbanda, who "recruited exclusively among men [who] are few and feared and their activity is surrounded by profound mystery". He also wrote that a large number of the owners of an omakola, a musical instrument, were passive homosexuals (omasenge), who "dressed like women, did women's work, and 'contracted marriage' with other men who already had female wives". "An esenge [singular of omasenge] is essentially a man who has been possessed since childhood by a spirit of female sex, which has been drawing out of him, little by little, the taste for everything that is masculine and virile."

Among the Herero, it was "customary" for two men to form erotic friendships, known in Otjiherero as omapanga, which typically included anal intercourse. However, when either of the men married, the relationship would end. The Nama recognised a similar "mutual pact of friendship" which involved same-sex sexual relations. Fulk reported that, "As a rule the relationship thus entered upon primarily implies deep friendship and mutual assistance, especially in economic matters. It is also used as a means of establishing a homosexual relationship, especially by boys, who jealously watch over each other." These customs disappeared with modernization and the introduction of Western culture and homophobia to Namibia in the early 20th century. Anal intercourse between men became illegal under Roman-Dutch common law during this time. Although nobody had ever been convicted, instances were occasionally reported to the police, resulting in arrests and fingerprinting, and instilling fear in the LGBT community. The law was struck down as unconstitutional in June 2024.

== Religious performance ==
In 2017, Bishop Shekutaamba Nambala of the Evangelical Lutheran Church in Namibia, the largest Christian denominations in Namibia, condemned same-sex marriage and the traditional Aawambo practice of olufuko, which the Church considers "pagan" and "against Christianity". The Catholic Church also opposes same-sex marriage and does not allow its priests to officiate at such marriages. In December 2023, the Holy See published Fiducia supplicans, a declaration allowing Catholic priests to bless couples who are not considered to be married according to church teaching, including the blessing of same-sex couples. Agapitus Hausiku, the director of OutRight Namibia, expected a negative reaction from the Namibian Catholic Bishops' Conference, but welcomed the "ongoing discussion around same-sex marriages and the Christian faith". In 2020, the Methodist Church of Southern Africa voted to allow members, including ordained clergy, to enter into same-sex unions, while retaining the denomination's teaching that marriage is a union "between a man and a woman".

The Anglican Church of Southern Africa, which has one diocese in Namibia, does not permit same-sex marriages. Its marriage policies state that "holy matrimony is the lifelong and exclusive union between one man and one woman". In 2016, the synod voted against blessing same-sex unions. The decision split the Church, with several dioceses deciding to nonetheless proceed with the blessing of same-sex relationships, notably the Diocese of Saldanha Bay in South Africa. Archbishop Thabo Makgoba expressed disappointment with the decision not to bless same-sex unions, but added that "all is not lost", expressing hope that the matter would be debated again in the future. Former Archbishop Njongonkulu Ndungane also expressed his disappointment with the decision. In early 2023, the Church once again refused to allow its clergy to bless same-sex unions, but directed the synod to develop "guidelines for providing pastoral ministry to those in same-sex relationships". In May 2024, Archbishop Makgoba released a document recommending prayers for same-sex couples, which the synod rejected in September 2024. In September 2026, the Church again rejected a motion relating to a proposed "ministry of inclusion" for parishioners in same-sex relationships.

In 2015, the General Synod of the Dutch Reformed Church voted by a 64% majority to recognise same-sex marriages, bless the relationships of same-sex couples and allow gay ministers and clergy (who are not required to be celibate). The decision applies to 9 of the 10 synods; with the Namibia Synod being excluded, but it does apply to the Northern Synod, which includes parts of the Caprivi Strip. The decision caused backlash and objections, resulting in it being reversed a year later. A dozen church members subsequently took the denomination to court to restore the 2015 decision. In 2019, the North Gauteng High Court reversed the decision, ruling that while religious organizations have the freedom to define marriage the 2016 decision to ban same-sex marriage was not made in accordance with the church's proper process. A freedom of conscience clause allows pastors with objections to opt out of performing same-sex weddings, so that individual pastors are free to choose whether to bless same-sex marriages.

== Public opinion ==
A 2024 Afrobarometer survey showed that 22% of Namibians agreed that "people should have the right to marry whoever they choose no matter the gender of their partners", while 68% disagreed and 10% were undecided or had refused to answer. Support was higher amongst women and in urban centres.

== See also ==
- LGBTQ rights in Namibia
- Recognition of same-sex unions in Africa
- Same-sex union court cases
