= Omar van Reenen =

Namibian human rights activist

Omar van Reenen (born c. 1996) is a Namibian human rights activist who advocates for the rights of the LGBT community in Namibia. Van Reenen is the co-founder of the Namibia Equal Rights Movement (Equal Namibia), a grassroots and youth-led social movement campaigning for equality for LGBT people.

== Early life ==
Van Reenen was born and raised in Narraville, a suburb of Walvis Bay in the Erongo Region of Namibia. Born following the end of apartheid in Namibia, they were born into what had previously been considered to be a coloured family under apartheid laws, and is half Egyptian. Van Reenen's grandfather had been a hotelier who had founded Namibia's first hotel for non-white people, which went on to become a centre for anti-apartheid resistance during the South West Africa period, during which time Namibia was a territory of South Africa.

Van Reenen attended Duinesig High School in Walvis Bay. Between 2014 and 2015, they served as the junior mayor of Walvis Bay, representing the city's children and young people. After serving as the Namibian ambassador at the Genius Olympiad, a global science event in which students present solutions to environmental problems, they were offered a scholarship to study biochemistry and political science at the State University of New York at Oswego in the United States. During their time there, they became the first international student to serve as president of the university's student government.

Van Reenen is non-binary and uses they/them pronouns. They regularly perform at Drag Night Namibia, a regular LGBT performance night held in a club in Windhoek.

== Activism ==
Van Reenen has likened legal discrimination against LGBT people in Namibia to discrimination against non-white people that occurred under apartheid. They have frequently criticised the Government of Namibia for permitting what they consider to be "state-sanctioned homophobia". Van Reenen considers the Constitution of Namibia to enshrine rights for LGBT people within article eight, which guarantees respect for all Namibians, regardless of sex or gender, and has accused politicians of eroding the country's status as a constitutional democracy by ignoring this and article three, which prohibits apartheid ideology. In 2023, Van Reenen publicly criticised the Popular Democratic Movement and the All People's Party for advocating for, or remaining silent about, proposed homophobic laws, despite having campaigned during the 2019 general election as "champions" of the LGBT community. This followed comments by the APP's general secretary, Vincent Kanyetu, who called same-sex marriage "taboo" and "an abomination".

Van Reenen has also criticised the Namibian media for "actively contributing to hate, violence and discrimination", and in 2023 called on the then-President of Namibia, Hage Geingob, to intervene to prevent further rises in homophobia and anti-LGBT rhetoric. Van Reenen criticised Geingob's government for ignoring advice from the Law Reform and Development Commission to repeal Namibia's colonial anti-sodomy law which criminalised consensual sexual activity between men, and also for ignoring the Ombudsman's proposed Hate Speech Bill.

Van Reenen has also criticised the role of church leaders in spreading homophobia in Namibia, following an attack on a transgender woman in Walvis Bay in 2024.

Van Reenen has called for the decolonialisation of Namibian ideas and views about LGBT people. They have criticised politicians who have stated that homosexuality is a Western import, and instead considers homophobia in Namibia to stem from Western influence during the colonial period.

=== Equal Namibia ===
Following his return to Namibia, van Reenen became a noted LGBT rights activist in the country. In March 2021, they co-founded Equal Namibia in response to the plight of Namibian citizen Phillip Lühl and his Mexican husband, Guillermo Delgado, whose daughters Paula and Maya, who were born via a surrogate in South Africa, had been denied Namibian citizenship and therefore prohibited from entering the country. In May 2021, Paula and Maya were issued travel documents, allowing them to enter Namibia, and in October 2021, they were both granted Namibian citizenship.

Van Reenen has likened LGBT activism to resistance against apartheid, and through Equal Namibia campaigns for constitutional rights and protections for LGBT Namibians, often participating in court cases, including before the Supreme Court of Namibia. Following their support of the #BringPaulaAndMayaHome campaign, van Reenen supported two couples appealing for the Supreme Court to recognise same-sex marriages that occurred abroad when one of the partners is born outside of Namibia. On 16 May 2023, the Supreme Court recognised such partnerships when they had occurred outside of the country, though this was followed by an increase in what van Reenen described as homophobia from politicians and church leaders against the ruling, with same sex marriage remaining illegal within Namibia itself. Van Reenen subsequently shared safety advice for LGBT Namibians, including calling for them to delete social media apps such as Grindr due to concerns about anti-LGBT campaigners using such apps to harass and blackmail gay Namibians.

Through Equal Namibia, van Reenen has also organised events throughout the country to mark Pride Month. In December 2021, they commemorated Namibia's first LGBT historic landmark, a rainbow sidewalk outside of the Namibia Breweries building in central Windhoek. They have also promoted the rights and plights of LGBT people in Namibia abroad, including at Berlin Pride in 2022.
