= Legal Assistance Centre =

Public interest law firm in Windhoek, Namibia

- Abbreviation: LAC
- Formation: 1988
- Founder: Dave Smuts
- Type: Nonprofit organization, public interest law firm
- Purpose: Human rights, Legal aid, Law reform
- Headquarters: Windhoek, Namibia
- Services: Litigation, Research, Education, Advocacy
- Website: www.lac.org.na

The Legal Assistance Centre is a human rights organization in Windhoek, the capital of Namibia. The organization was established in 1988 during the apartheid era to litigate on behalf of people who were oppressed by the government and continues to operate today.

According to the newspaper The Namibian, the lawyers and paralegals who opened the centre "were immediately flooded with cases from people complaining about human rights abuses" and hundreds of court cases were launched against the apartheid South African government.

The centre continues to conduct public interest litigation and expanded its mandate to incorporate public human rights education, research, law reform and free legal advice. Its work is guided by a board of directors.

Since Namibia's independence, the organization's areas of focus have included:

- police brutality
- immigration
- women's rights
- children's rights
- people living with HIV
- indigenous populations
- prisoners
- land rights
- inheritance
- LGBT issues

== History ==
The history of the Legal Assistance Centre is embedded in Namibia's struggle to end South Africa's apartheid occupation and brutal rule of the country. In the 1980s, the South West African People's Organization (SWAPO) was making progress in their fight for an independent state. However, human rights violations and the use of apartheid era law continued to justify inhumane, degrading and discriminatory practices.

On the legal front, lawyer Dave Smuts began pursuing public interest cases against the apartheid government. In 1987, Dave Smuts worked with churches in northern Namibia to successfully challenge the detainment of a group who had been held in prison without trial for several years. They were successful and together Smuts and church leaders began helping people obtain legal aid and spread information about laws.

In July 1988, the Legal Assistance Centre was officially opened in Ongwediva in northern Namibia by Dave Smuts and a group of lawyers and paralegals. The Legal Assistance Centre's founding was based on the principle of taking public interest legal cases to court and providing free services to clients. Additional offices were set up in Windhoek, Tsumeb, Walvis Bay and Rundu.

Nearly 500 cases were handled by the organization in its first year of operation, the vast majority involving human rights abuses (assault, rape, detention) perpetrated by security forces. Labour cases (unfair dismissal, non payment of wages, workmen's compensation claims) were also brought to court in the Centre's first year.

== Notable cases ==
The Legal Assistance Centre has initiated a number of civil cases seeking injunctive relief and monetary awards on behalf of its clients. The Legal Assistance has also filed suits related to the conditions of incarceration for adults and children.

=== Sterilization of women after childbirth ===
The Legal Assistance Centre represented HIV positive women who were sterilized while at a state hospital. The women claimed the sterilization occurred without their informed consent by doctors employed at state hospitals. In 2012, LM&MI&NH versus the government of the Republic of Namibia, the women won their case at the High Court and awarded the women 1.2 million Namibian dollars in damages. The ruling was appealed to the Namibian Supreme Court, which upheld the High Court ruling but dismissed the claim that the women's positive HIV statuses were the underlying reason for the sterilisation.
