= Kareeboomvloer massacre =

The Kareeboomvloer massacre was a 2005 mass murder on the Kareeboomvloer farm (Afrikaans: Karee tree valley, after the Karee tree) in the Hardap Region of Namibia, situated between Rehoboth and Kalkrand. It was the "biggest bloodbath in Namibian criminal history".

== Massacre and subsequent arrests ==
On 5 March 2005 brothers Sylvester and Gavin Beukes killed eight people at the Kareeboomvloer farm: the owners, an employee and his pregnant wife, two adult members of the employee's family, and two small children. All people present on the farm on the day of the crime were killed. The attackers first shot and killed the owners Justus and Elzabé Erasmus and then executed all witnesses by first firing at them and then setting five of them alight with diesel fuel. Four of the victims were still alive when they were set on fire. The Beukes brothers then stole the farm pickup car, loaded it with rifles and goats from the farm, and hid the loot at Stoney Neidel's house in Rehoboth and on his farm Areb, situated west of Rehoboth.

Gavin Beukes, Sylvester Beukes and Stoney Neidel were arrested a few days after the massacre. Sylvester Beukes admitted guilt on all counts of murder but 10 days after the murder claimed that the owners' son, Justus Christiaan "Shorty" Erasmus gave the order to kill his parents, handed a weapon and ammunition to Sylvester, and promised N$ 50,000 payment, as well as legal representation. Erasmus denied these accusations but was also arrested. He and Neidel were later released on bail, while the Beukes brothers remained in custody throughout the trial.

== Trial ==
The proceedings were conducted in the High Court in Windhoek and lasted for over four years. The three defendants were each represented by Windhoek defense lawyers, Sylvester Beukes by Titus Lipumbu of Titus Lipumbu Legal Practitioners, Gavin Beukes by Titus Mbaeva of Mbaeva & Associates, and Boris Isaacks of Isaacks & Benz Inc represented Neidel. According to testimonies, Sylvester Beukes killed all eight people by himself whereas his brother Gavin was a bystander who was, in his own words, "at the wrong place at the wrong time". Sylvester Beukes claimed that he tied his brother Gavin to a pole so that he could only have heard, but not observed, the shooting. Forensic evidence showed, however, that Gavin Beukes was no further than 5 metres (16 ft) away when the victims were shot.

Prior to sentencing, Acting Prison Commissioner Raphael Hamunyela was called as witness to explain how life sentences are administered in Namibia. All life sentences in Namibia can be set aside after as little as ten years, and the nature and severity of the committed crimes are not factors weighed by the prison authorities in considerations of early release. Multiple life terms count as one. For the sentences in the Kareeboomvloer mass murder case the Deputy Prosecutor therefore specifically asked not to impose a sentence of life imprisonment but to set definite periods. Judge President Petrus Damaseb followed the prosecution's request and in November 2011 handed out some of the longest prison terms in Namibian history. The Beukes brothers were sentenced to a combined total of 670 years in jail. Several concurrent sentences led to an effective prison term of 105 years for Sylvester Beukes, and 84 years for Gavin Beukes. Damaseb remarked about the case:

"[Y]ou tortured your victims and committed crimes the likes of which I hope I will not [again] have the misfortune to preside over during the remainder of my judicial career. [...] You truly are an embodiment of evil."

The likely motive for the killings was revenge with respect to the farm owners, and doing away with witnesses. Justus Erasmus had previously fired Sylvester Beukes, and laid theft charges against him. Beukes emerged from the Kalkrand police station in December 2004, three months prior to the massacre, where he was in custody for the charges brought by Erasmus. The claim that Beukes was contracted by the farmer's son was dismissed by the judge as not proven beyond reasonable doubt. Sylvester Beukes' testimony contained a number of contradictions and unlikely claims, most prominently that Shorty Erasmus had offered to pay for his legal representation in the murder case—paying for the defense of his parents' murderer would inevitably have implicated him. Shorty Erasmus was thus acquitted of having contracted the murders. Stoney Neidel was found guilty of theft and illegal possession of firearms and sentenced to an effective six years of imprisonment.

== Appeal ==
In February 2018 the Supreme Court of Namibia ruled in an unrelated case that it is unconstitutional to sentence offenders for so long that there is "no realistic prospect of release in the sense of fully engaging in society again—if at all—during their life times". In the mean time, the provisions of life sentences had also been changed such that a person becomes eligible for parole only after 25 years, not as previously administered, 10 years. Definite periods of sentencing now make the prisoner eligible for parole after serving two thirds of the sentence. The Supreme Court ruled that, if a court chooses not to hand out a life sentence, it cannot use the mechanism of definite sentences to impose a longer sentence. The longest prison sentence that henceforth may be given in Namibia is 37.5 years, which will make a prisoner eligible for parole after 25 years as in a life sentence.

An appeal by Sylvester Beukes was successful in 2024, and his sentence was reduced to an effective 37.5 years: 30 years for the first murder, 35 years for the second murder, 15 years of which to be served concurrent with the first murder, and 6 life sentences to be served concurrent with the second murder. This was backdated to the time of sentencing. Other Namibian convicts serving extra long sentences also had their effective jail terms reduced to or below the limit set by the Supreme Court.
