= Lower court =

Courts other than supreme court

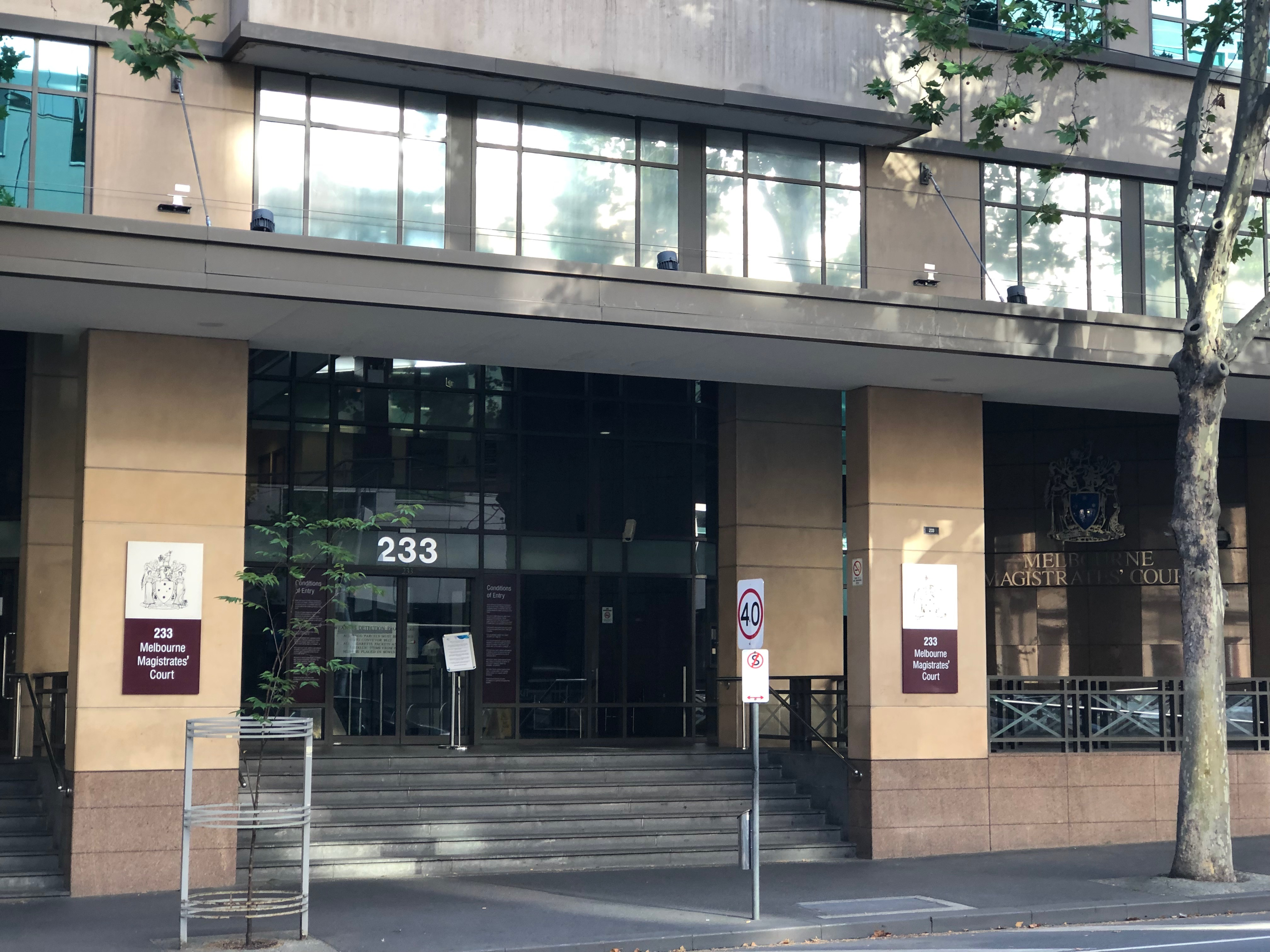
The Melbourne Magistrates' Court, the principal venue of the Magistrates' Court of Victoria. The Magistrates' Court is the lowest court of the Victorian court hierarchy

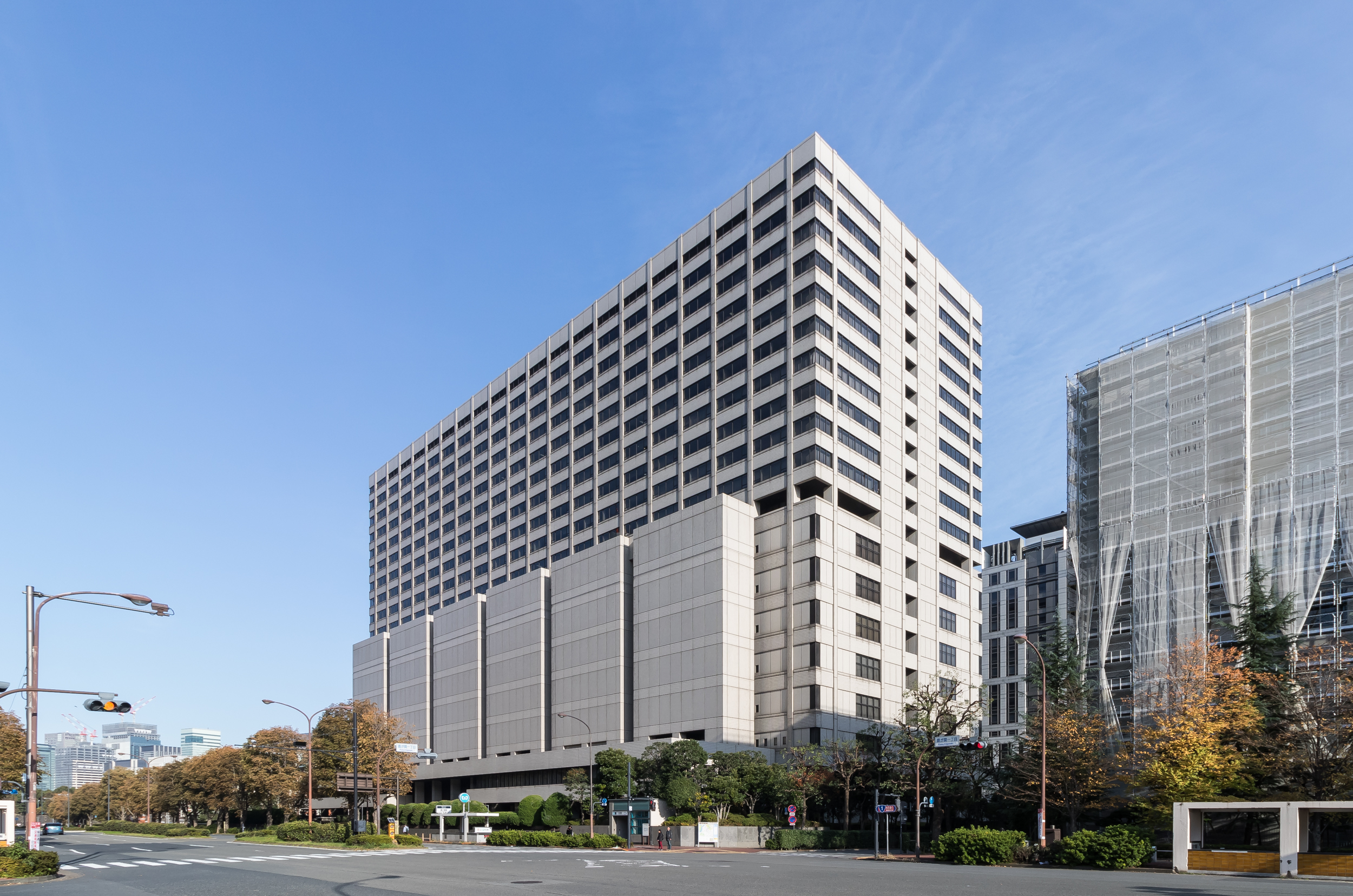
Though Tokyo High Court has jurisdiction over first appeal cases as appellate court, it is still an inferior court to Supreme Court of Japan

A lower court or inferior court is a court from which an appeal may be taken, usually referring to courts other than supreme court. In relation to an appeal from one court to another, the lower court is the court whose decision is being reviewed, which may be the original trial court or some of appellate court lower in rank than the supreme court which is hearing the appeal. In other words, lower courts are 'lower' in hierarchical chain of appellate procedure than other higher appellate courts. Usually it is obligation of a lower court to follow the decision of higher appellate court, even in civil law countries where precedents have no binding power.

Some common law countries use term "lower court" or "inferior court" as antonym for "superior court", meaning such lower courts have only limited jurisdiction according to importance of case (usually decided by monetary amount of claims). For information on this kind of courts, see Small claims court and superior court.

== See also ==
- Magistrates' court
- Court system of Canada
- Lower Courts of Namibia
- Lower court of San Marino
- Inferior courts of the United States
