= Okujepisa omukazendu =

Northwest Namibian "wife-sharing" tradition

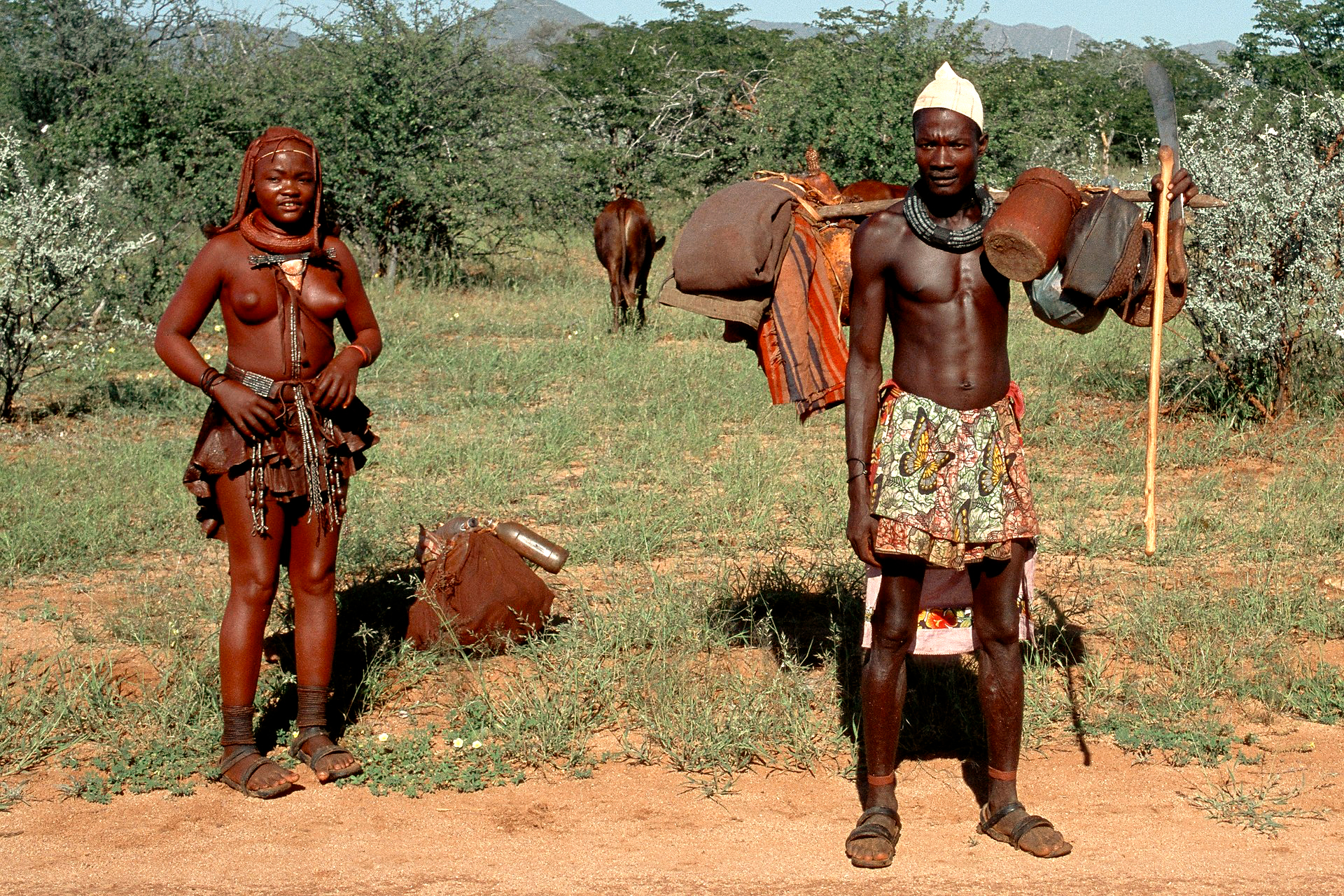
A Himba man and woman, wearing red otijze and herding in the Kunene region

Okujepisa omukazendu (lit. 'offering a wife to a guest') (Note: Also sometimes called oupanga, which means "demonstrating a true, deep friendship" and can be applied to any act or event evidencing friendship between two persons, not exclusively okujepisa omukazendu.) is the polyamorous sexual practice of hospitable "wife-sharing" among the nomadic OvaHimba and OvaZemba peoples of Namibia's Kunene and Omusati regions. According to the practice, a man welcomes a male guest (typically a family member or best friend, more rarely an important visitor, and never a stranger or tourist) to his home by allowing the visitor to sleep in the man's bed and have sex with his wife for the night, while the man sleeps in another hut or outside. The woman has little agency in the arrangement. The opposite arrangement, whereby a woman chooses a female friend for her husband to have sex with, exists, but is rare. Women surveyed in rural North Kunene reported that their husbands lend them to friends in hopes of later having sex with the friends' wives.

The practice has been described as "generations-old", "centuries-old", and "ancient". The practice's justifications include belief that it deepens friendship and prevents promiscuity and jealousy in both sexes. Okujepisa omukazendu was reported in 2002 to be dying out, and in 2005 to be "gradually fading away".

Namibian feminists assert that okujepisa omukazendu is rape, and that women who resist participation or refuse to have sex with guests face repercussions, including ostracism, beating, and harassment. Politician and activist Rosa Namises said that okujepisa omukazendu "is not benefiting women but men who want to control their partners". Rural women are identified as being particularly at risk of retaliatory violence. The practice has been identified as an aggravating factor in Namibia's HIV/AIDS crisis. A 2002 survey found that urban respondents in the Kunene region almost ubiquitously found the practice dangerous in terms of STDs and jealousy, while rural male respondents found no such problems with it.

In 2014, Kazeongere Tjeundo, a Himba lawmaker and the vice-president of the Democratic Turnhalle Alliance (DTA), proposed legislation to enshrine okujepisa omukazendu in law, fearing that concerns about HIV/AIDS would end the practice. He argued that okujepisa omukazendu mitigates domestic violence and claimed that women may decline to have sex with guests but should be compelled to share a bed with guests. His proposal generated controversy from activists and legal experts, and the DTA distanced itself from Tjeundo, calling okujepisa omukazendu "wrong" and promising to take steps against the legislator. Tjeundo responded saying that he had been misinterpreted, but refused the instruction from the DTA to clarify his position and apologize. Rhingo Mutambo, a public relations officer in the Office of the Prime Minister of Namibia, criticized what he perceived to be sensationalist Western media coverage for implying tourists receive "free sex" in Himba communities. He clarified that the practice of okujepisa omukazendu is restricted to community members, and defended its social functionality.

== See also ==
- Polygamy in Namibia
- Human rights in Namibia
- Droit du seigneur
- Infidelity
- Cuckoldry
- Swinging
- Women in Namibia
