= South West African Constitution of 1968 =

South-West Africa Constitution Act, 1968

Parliament of South Africa
- Long title: Act to consolidate the laws relating to the constitution of an executive committee and a legislative assembly for the territory of South-West Africa, the powers, authorities and functions severally of that committee and assembly and the administration of and legislation for that territory.
- Citation: Act No. 39 of 1968
- Territorial extent: South West Africa
- Enacted by: Parliament of South Africa
- Assented to: 29 March 1968
- Commenced: 5 April 1968
- Repealed: 21 March 1990

Repeals
- South-West Africa Constitution Act, 1925; South-West Africa Constitution Act, 1925, Amendment Act, 1927; South-West Africa Constitution Act, 1925, Further Amendment Act, 1931; Constitution (Prevention of Disabilities) Act, 1940; South-West Africa Affairs Amendment Act, 1949; South-West Africa Affairs Amendment Act, 1951; South-West Africa Bantu Affairs Administration Act, 1954; South-West Africa Constitution Amendment Act, 1955; South-West Africa Constitution Amendment Act, 1957; South-West Africa Constitution Amendment Act, 1966

Amended by
- South-West Africa Affairs Act, 1969 South-West Africa Constitution Amendment Act, 1970 South-West Africa Constitution Amendment Act, 1977

Repealed by
- Constitution of Namibia
- Status: Repealed

The South-West Africa Constitution Act, 1968, was a law enacted under the apartheid regime by the Parliament of South Africa that established a framework for the internal self-government of South West Africa (now Namibia). While it created a legislative assembly and executive body for the territory, it reserved ultimate power and control over key areas to the South African government. The act was a central instrument of South Africa's administration of the territory during a period of intense international dispute over its legal status and was repealed upon Namibia's independence in 1990.

== Background ==
South Africa had governed South West Africa since 1920 under a Class C Mandate from the League of Nations. After the dissolution of the League and the establishment of the United Nations, South Africa refused to place the territory under a UN Trusteeship Agreement, arguing that the mandate had lapsed. The International Court of Justice and the UN General Assembly repeatedly condemned South Africa's continued presence as illegal.

In response to mounting international pressure and to solidify its control, South Africa sought to integrate South West Africa more closely into its own political and administrative structure, underpinned by the policy of apartheid. The act was a consolidation and refinement of earlier, piecemeal legislation, intended to create a more formalized system of internal governance that remained entirely subordinate to Pretoria.

== Contents ==
The act had inherited the structure of government as it was established under the Constitution of 1925, its direct predecessor.

=== Administrator ===
The Administrator was appointed by the State President for a five-year term and served as the chief executive officer of the territory. The Administrator acted in most matters on the advice of the Executive Committee but was subject to the direction and control of the South African government.

=== Executive Committee ===
The Executive Committee was responsible for the administration of matters on which the Legislative Assembly could make laws. It consisted of the Administrator and four other members elected by the Assembly according to the principle of proportional representation.

=== Legislative Assembly ===
The Legislative Assembly was an 18-member body elected by registered voters in the territory from 18 delimited electoral divisions. These same divisions were grouped into six larger constituencies for electing white representatives to the House of Assembly, symbolizing the territory's integrated status.

The Assembly had the power to make laws, known as "ordinances," for the territory. However, its powers were severely circumscribed.

=== Limitations on legislative power ===
A key feature of the act was the extensive list of "reserved matters" on which the Legislative Assembly could not legislate without prior consent from the State President. These matters included:

- Bantu affairs
- Civil aviation
- Railways and harbours
- The public service
- The constitution and jurisdiction of courts
- Postal, telegraph, and telephone services
- Military and police forces
- Immigration
- Customs and excise
- Currency and banking

Furthermore, the Assembly could not impose taxes or appropriate funds from the territory's Revenue Fund unless the proposal was introduced or recommended by the Administrator, ensuring South African control over the territory's finances.

=== South African carte blanche ===
The Act explicitly reserved the "full powers of administration and legislation" over the territory to the State President and Parliament. It stated that only the Parliament could legislate on the reserved matters and that any ordinance passed by the Legislative Assembly could be overridden by an Act of Parliament. This made it clear that the self-government granted was not sovereignty.

=== Special provisions ===
The act declared that the enclave of Walvis Bay was to be considered part of South West Africa for the purposes of the act. It also contained special provisions for the Caprivi Strip (now the Zambezi Region), allowing the State President to legislate for it directly by proclamation, and no South African law or Assembly ordinance applied there unless expressly declared.

The official languages for government business were English and Afrikaans, though the use of German was permitted in the South-West Africa Division of the Supreme Court.

== 1977 amendment ==
South-West Africa Constitution Amendment Act, 1977

Parliament of South Africa
- Long title: Act to amend the South-West Africa Constitution Act, 1968, so as to extend, with a view to the regulation of additional matters, including the administration of Walvis Bay, and the eventual attainment of independence by the territory of South West Africa, the powers of the State President to make laws for the said territory; and to provide for matters connected therewith.
- Citation: Act No. 95 of 1977
- Territorial extent: South West Africa
- Enacted by: Parliament of South Africa
- Assented to: 20 June 1977
- Commenced: 1 July 1977
- Repealed: 21 March 1990

Amends
- South-West Africa Constitution Act, 1968
- Status: Abrogated

The South West Africa Constitution Amendment Act, 1977, enacted in the aftermath of the Turnhalle Constitutional Conference, it granted the State President sweeping powers to legislate for the territory by proclamation, effectively setting aside the 1968 constitutional structure. Its primary purpose was to provide the legal basis for the State President to manage the transition to an independence orchestrated by South Africa.

=== Provisions and implications ===
The act fundamentally amended Section 38 of the 1968 Constitution. It authorized the State President to make laws for the territory "with a view to the eventual attainment of independence", thus removing virtually all subject-matter restrictions that had constrained the Legislative Assembly. It granted the State President the power to repeal or amend any legal provision, including this Act and any other Act of Parliament, enabling him to override not only the territory's Constitution but also the Acts of Parliament.

=== Administrator-General ===
The most significant practical application of the 1977 amendment was the devolution of powers to a newly created office - the Administrator-General. Appointed by the State President, the Administrator-General became the supreme administrative authority in the territory, governing largely by proclamation.

== Reception and legacy ==
The Constitution Act of 1968 and its 1977 amendment were condemned by the United Nations and the international community, which viewed them as illegal attempts by South Africa to annex the territory and control its political future.

Internally, the 1968 act established a system of government that exclusively represented the white minority population. The 1977 amendment, while used to devolve powers to the territorial government, was designed to ensure South Africa retained ultimate control over the transition process, marginalizing the Soviet-backed South West African People's Organization.

The constitutional framework established by these acts was de facto repealed when Namibia achieved independence on 21 March 1990 and its own constitution, drafted by the Constituent Assembly, came into force.

== See also ==
- South West Africa
- 1978 South West African legislative election
- Apartheid
- Apartheid legislation
- Turnhalle Constitutional Conference

== Related statutes ==
- Text of the statute as originally enacted
- South-West Africa Affairs Act, 1969
- South West Africa Constitution Amendment Act, 1977
- Proclamations 180 and 181 of the State President, 1977
