= Dave Smuts =

Namibian lawyer

Dave Smuts (David Smuts) is as of 2023 one of the four judges on the Supreme Court of Namibia and the founder of the Legal Assistance Centre. He is a graduate of Harvard Law School.

Smuts began practising law in 1980. He assisted in founding Namibia's largest newspaper The Namibian in 1985. In 1988, Smuts founded Namibia's Legal Assistance Centre whose stated goal is to address human rights injustices perpetrated by apartheid era government in Namibia. In 1992, he left the Legal Assistance Centre and started his own private practice.

Prior to his appointment to the Supreme Court in 2015, Smuts was appointed a judge in Namibia's High Court in 2010.
