= Drag Night Namibia =

Drag show in Windhoek

Drag Night Namibia is a monthly drag show taking place in Windhoek, Namibia. It was started in March 2021 by drag queen Rodelio Lewis, also known as Mavis Dash, with help from pop singer Lize Ehlers, along with Gigi Has Arrived and Chaulken Alphonso McNab. Since then, they have hosted over 40 shows. The event was temporarily paused in June 2023 following an increase in anti-LGBTQ rhetoric after the Namibian Supreme Court's ruling recognizing same-sex marriage, returning the next month. They have since expanded to other events, such as Drag Night Unplugged and Drag Night Cabaret. The organization also participated in the international initiative "Drag & Vogue Beyond Borders". In 2024 Drag Night Namibia brought on their first transgender performer, Deyoncé Naris.
