= LGBTQ rights in Namibia =

- Namibia
- Legal status: Legal since 2024
- Gender identity: Sex reassignment surgery is required to change legal gender
- Military: No
- Discrimination protections: Limited protection against hate speech based on sexual orientation/preference.

Family rights
- Recognition of relationships: No
- Adoption: Ambiguous

Lesbian, gay, bisexual, transgender, and queer (LGBTQ) rights in Namibia have expanded in the 21st century, although LGBTQ people still have limited legal protections. Namibia's colonial-era laws criminalising male homosexuality were historically unenforced, and were overturned by the country's High Court in 2024.

The climate for LGBTQ people in Namibia has eased in recent years. The country's leading LGBTQ advocacy group is OutRight Namibia, formed in March 2010 and officially registered in November 2010. It has organised Namibia's first pride parades and seeks to be "a voice for lesbian women, gay men, bisexuals and transgender and intersex people in Namibia". Other LGBTQ groups include MPower Community Trust, which provides awareness of sexual health for gay and bisexual men, the Namibian Gays and Lesbian Movement, which provides counselling and advice to LGBTQ people and organises educational programs to raise awareness of LGBTQ Namibians, Tulinam, an LGBTQ faith-based group, and Wings to Transcend Namibia, a transgender group founded by Jholerina Brinnette Timbo.

In 2023, the Namibian supreme court ruled that Namibia must recognize same-sex marriages of Namibian citizens conducted abroad. However, in late 2024 parliament passed a law forbidding such recognition.

== History ==
Homosexuality and same-sex relations have been documented among various modern-day Namibian groups. In the 18th century, the Khoikhoi people recognised the terms koetsire which refers to a man who is sexually receptive to another man, and soregus, which refers to same-sex masturbation usually among friends. Anal intercourse and sexual relations between women also occurred, though more rarely.

In the 1920s, German anthropologist Kurt Falk reported homosexuality and same-sex marriage ceremonies among the Ovambo, Nama, Herero and Himba peoples. Ovambo men taking the passive role in sex with other men are called kimbanda or eshengi. Among the Herero, erotic friendships (known as oupanga) between two people regardless of sex were common, and typically included anal intercourse (okutunduka vanena). In the 1970s, Portuguese ethnographer Carlos Estermann observed an Ovambo tradition where men known as esenge would dress like women, do women's work and marry other men. Ovambo society believed they were possessed by female spirits.

== Legality of same-sex sexual activity ==
LGBTQ flag map of Namibia

The High Court of Namibia in Windhoek ruled that Namibia's common law crimes of “sodomy” and “unnatural sexual offences” were unconstitutional and invalid on 21 June 2024. The court also ruled on the same day that the inclusion of references to the crime of sodomy in the Criminal Procedure Act, Immigration Act, and Defense Act were similarly unconstitutional and invalid.

Prior to the decision, there was no codified sodomy provision, but sodomy and unnatural sexual offences were crimes under the Roman-Dutch common law in force. Sodomy had been defined as "unlawful and intentional sexual relations per anum between two human males." This therefore excluded sexual relations per anum by heterosexual couples or lesbians.

Section 299 of the Criminal Procedure Act of 2004 (Afrikaans: Strafproseswet van 2004) made reference to evidentiary issues on a charge of sodomy or attempted sodomy. Schedule 1 of the Act grouped sodomy together with a list of other crimes for which police are authorised to make an arrest without a warrant or to use of deadly force in the course of that arrest, among other aspects (Sections 38, 42, 44, 63 and 112). Public displays of affection between two men can be considered "immoral" behaviour, which is punishable under the Combating of Immoral Practices Act of 1980 (Afrikaans: Wet op die Bekamping van Onsedelike Praktyke, 1980).

In August 2016, the United Nations Human Rights Committee released a report in Windhoek, Namibia's capital city, calling on the country to abolish its sodomy ban. Reacting to the committee's call, John Walters, the Ombudsman of Namibia whose office is mandated to promote and protect human rights, said that people should be free to live their lives as they see fit. Walters said:

I think the old sodomy law has served its purpose. How many prosecutions have there been? I believe none over the past 20 years. If we don’t prosecute people, why do we have the act?

The Government of Namibia informed the United Nations that it has currently no intentions to repeal the sodomy law. Several lawmakers expressed different opinions, however, National Council Chairperson Margaret Mensah-Williams said, "irrespective of how uncomfortable it is, it is time that we should talk about the LGBTI community. They are part of our communities." Yvonne Dausab, chairperson of the Law Reform and Development Commission, said that the Constitution of Namibia lacks "sufficient language to describe and protect rights pertaining to the LGBTI plus community". At a roundtable hosted in 2019 by the ombudsman to address equal protection for Namibia's LGBTQ community, several lawmakers called for these issues to be tackled urgently.

In June 2019, following the repeal of Botswana's sodomy law by its High Court, First Lady Monica Geingos called for the repeal of Namibia's sodomy law, saying that the "sodomy law's days are numbered" and "Namibia will be next".

In June 2024, a Namibia's high court declared two laws from the country's colonial era unconstitutional. The government has appealed the ruling in July 2024.

== Recognition of same-sex relationships ==
In 2001, a Namibian woman and her German wife, Elisabeth Frank, sued to have their relationship recognised so that Frank could reside in Namibia. The Immigration Board granted the residence permit, and the State appealed to the Supreme Court. While the court ruled that Frank should be given a permanent residence permit, which she received a year later, it did not rule in favour of same-sex relationships.

The Ombudsman of Namibia spoke in August 2016 on the matter of same-sex marriage and said the following:

If people of the same sex would like to get married, it is their choice, whether the country, the community, churches and government acknowledge that [is something else].

In December 2017, a case was brought to the High Court by Namibian citizen Johann Potgieter who married his South African husband Daniel Digashu in South Africa in 2015. The couple filed a lawsuit against the Namibian Government to have their 2015 South African marriage recognised in Namibia. In January 2018, Digashu won a court petition to allow him to enter Namibia as the High Court continues to review their case. The ombudsman said that he is not opposed to the recognition of their marriage in Namibia.

In 2018, a second case was filed by Namibian-born lawyer Anita Grobler and her South African spouse, Susan Jacobs, who have been together in a relationship for over 25 years, in an attempt to have their 2009 South African marriage recognized in Namibia and to obtain residence rights for Jacobs. A third case was filed in 2018 by Anette Seiler-Lilles and her German wife Anita Seiler-Lilles, who have been together since 1998. The couple seeks to have their 2017 German marriage recognized in Namibia.

In June 2019, Judge President Petrus Damaseb directed that a full bench of three judges should be designated to hear all pending cases. Ombudsman John Walters argues that marriage should be opened to couples irrespective of gender. Walters is one of eight respondents cited in the case; the other seven respondents include the Minister of Home Affairs and Immigration and the Attorney General who have both filed notices against same-sex marriage.

On 16 May 2023, the Supreme Court of Namibia ruled that same-sex marriages legally performed abroad must be recognized by the government. The judgement gives non-Namibian spouses in same-sex marriages the same residence rights in Namibia that are accorded to spouses in opposite-sex marriages. This ruling was overturned in December 2024, when a new act was signed into law which explicitly forbid same-sex marriages and the recognition of those performed abroad.

== Discrimination protections ==
Discrimination on the basis of sexual orientation or gender identity is not outlawed in Namibia. The Namibian Constitution includes the category "social status", which could be interpreted as covering LGBTQ people.

Namibia is one of the rare cases in which a provision protecting people from discrimination based on sexual orientation was repealed by a legislative body. As early as 1992, local activists successfully lobbied to include "sexual orientation" among the prohibited grounds of discrimination in the Labour Act 1992. In 2004, a new labour law was discussed in Parliament and the inclusion of the term was a topic of heated debates, resulting in the exclusion of the term from the final text. However, this law never came into force. The Labour Act 2007 currently in force does not include sexual orientation among the prohibited grounds of discrimination.

In August 2016, the United Nations Human Rights Committee called on the Government of Namibia to adopt legislation explicitly prohibiting discrimination based on sexual orientation, including in the Labour Act (Act No. 11 of 2007). Following the committee's call, the Ombudsman of Namibia, argued that a measure prohibiting discrimination on the ground of sexual orientation needs to be in the Constitution.

In October 2021, a Namibian court found that the constitution bans discrimination against sexual orientation in the case of a gay couple's child citizenship case with one of the parent a foreigner. However, the Namibian Supreme Court overturned this specific case on technical grounds but did not address the larger issue of discrimination.

=== Health ===
The Ethical Guidelines for Health Professionals, issued in 2010 by The Health Professions Councils of Namibia, states that health professionals should:

- Section 2.1.5 "Make sure his or her personal beliefs of the profession do not prejudice care of the patients. Beliefs that might prejudice care relate to the patient’s race, culture, ethnicity, social status, lifestyle, perceived economic worth, age, gender, disability, communicable disease status, sexual orientation, religious or spiritual beliefs, or any other condition of vulnerability."
- Section 2.6 "Be aware of the rights and laws concerning unfair discrimination on the basis of race, culture, ethnicity, social status, lifestyle, perceived economic worth, age, gender, disability, communicable disease status, sexual orientation, religious or spiritual beliefs, or any condition of vulnerability in the management of patients or their families as is contained in health rights legislation."
- Section 3.2.2 "Not discriminate against colleagues, including professionals applying for posts, on the basis of the health professionals views of the patients race, culture, ethnicity, social status, lifestyle, perceived economic worth, age, gender, disability, communicable disease status, HIV/Aids status, sexual orientation, religious or spiritual beliefs, or any condition of vulnerability."

In addition, The Patient Charter, issued by the Ministry of Health and Social Services, states that one of the core values of the Charter is "Impartiality", which requires "Treat all patients/clients equally, irrespective of status, religion, political belief, race, colour, gender and sexuality."

==== Mental health ====
The Regulations relating to scope of practice of clinical psychologists and educational psychologists, issued in 2009 by the Ministry of Health and Social Services, considers "sexual and gender identity" as disorders.

=== Hate speech ===
The Broadcasting Code for Broadcasting Licensees 2018 (General Notice No. 602), issued by the Communications Regulatory Authority of Namibia, states the following:

- Section 5 states "A broadcasting licensee may not broadcast material which contains, or which judged within the context contains, a scene or scenes, simulated or real, of any of the following: (e) sexual conduct which degrades a person in the sense that it advocates a particular form of hatred based on gender or sexual orientation and which constitutes incitement to cause harm."
- Section 7(2) on "Violence and hate speech" states "A broadcasting licensee may not broadcast material which, judged within context, sanctions, promotes or glamorizes violence or unlawful conduct based on race, age, sex, sexual orientation, ethnicity, colour, nationality, religion, creed, gender, economic or social economic status, age or mental or physical disability."
- Section 7(3) states "A broadcasting licensee may not broadcast material which, judged within context, amounts to - (b) incitement of imminent violence; or (c) is likely to incite, in a reasonable audience, hatred against, or serious contempt for, or severe ridicule of, any person or group of persons because of race, colour, age, ethnicity, nationality, religion, disability, creed, sex, sexual orientation or preferences or gender and that constitutes incitement to cause harm."

=== Hate crime laws ===
LGBTQ people in Namibia face discrimination, harassment and violence. Additionally, similarly to neighbouring South Africa, lesbians are occasionally the victims of so-called corrective rape, where male rapists purport to raping the lesbian victim with the intent of 'curing' her of her sexual orientation.

In August 2016, the United Nations Human Rights Committee called on Namibia to adopt hate crime legislation punishing homophobic and transphobic violence, and vigorously enforce it.

== Gender identity and expression ==
The Births, Marriages and Deaths Registration Act 81 of 1963 (Afrikaans: Wet op die Registrasie van Geboortes, Huwelike en Sterfgevalle, 1963) states that: "The Secretary may on the recommendation of the Secretary of Health, alter in the birth register of any person who has undergone a change of sex, the description of the sex of such person and may for this purpose call for such medical reports and institute such investigations as he may deem necessary."

It was reported in 2015 that applications for change of sex are done on a case-by-case basis and are not problematic, as long as a person can provide medical reports of their sex change, which includes undergoing sex reassignment surgery. Once the application is granted, a transgender person can apply for a new identity document and passport.

In addition, a transgender person who has not had a "change of sex" could possibly use the Identification Act 2 of 1996. The act states that "if an identity document does not reflect correctly the particulars of the person to whom it was issued, or contains a photograph which is no longer a recognizable image of that person" the Minister shall cancel it and replace it with an improved identity document.

== Blood donation ==
Individuals seeking to donate blood in Namibia must not have had more than one sexual partner within the past six months, irrespective of sexual orientation and gender. People "suspect of having contracted a sexually-transmitted disease such as HIV or syphilis" are not allowed to donate.

== Public opinion ==
A 2016 Afrobarometer opinion poll found that 55% of Namibians would welcome, or would not be bothered by having, a homosexual neighbour. Namibia was one of only four countries in Africa polled with a majority in favour, the others being South Africa, Cape Verde and Mozambique.

A 2021 Afrobarometer opinion poll found that 64% of respondents from Namibia would welcome or would not be bothered by having a homosexual neighbour.

== Living conditions ==
In 2005, the Deputy Minister of Home Affairs and Immigration, Teopolina Mushelenga, claimed that lesbians and gay men betrayed the fight for Namibian freedom, were responsible for the HIV/AIDS pandemic, and were an insult to African culture. In 2001, President Sam Nujoma warned about forthcoming purges against gays and lesbians in Namibia, saying "the police must arrest, imprison and deport homosexuals and lesbians found in Namibia." Home Affairs Minister Jerry Ekandjo in 2000 urged 700 newly graduated police officers to "eliminate" gays and lesbians "from the face of Namibia".

Mr Gay Namibia 2011, Wendelinus Hamutenya, was the victim of a homophobic assault in December 2011 in Windhoek.

In November 2012, Ricardo Amunjera was crowned Mr Gay Namibia. The pageant took place at a theatre-restaurant in the capital city, Windhoek. Amunjera went on to later marry his Motswana life partner Marc Omphemetse Themba in South Africa in 2013.

In December 2013, McHenry Venaani, the president of the Popular Democratic Movement (formerly DTA), spoke out in favor of LGBTQ rights and said that people should be allowed to live their private lives without interference.

There are reports of a widespread use of religious gay conversion therapy practices in Namibia.

=== Activism ===
Namibia's first pride march took place in Windhoek in December 2013. It was attended by about 100 people. The city of Swakopmund held its first pride parade in June 2016. They both have continued annually since then and have not faced any impediments by the Namibian Government. In June 2017, around 200 people marched in a pride parade in Windhoek, and in December 2018, hundreds of people marched in parades in the cities of Windhoek and Swakopmund.

In 2017, the Diversity Alliance of Namibia (DAN) was formed. The DAN is a collective of organisations representing sexual and gender minorities in Namibia. It includes the following organisations: Rights not Rescue Trust (RnRT), Tulinam, Young Feminist Movement of Namibia (Y-FEM), OutRight Namibia (ORN), Wings to Transcend Namibia (WTTN), Transgender Intersex and Androgynous Movement of Namibia (TIAMON), Rights for all Movement (RAM), Rural Dialogue Namibia, MPower Community Trust, and Voice of Hope Trust (VHT). The Alliance has elected Tulinam and RnRT as chair and vice-chair, respectively, and ORN as a secretariat and coordinating mechanism.

On 17 May 2018, the International Day Against Homophobia, Transphobia and Biphobia, the Outreach Health drop-in-centre, which is Namibia's first LGBTQ health centre, was launched by OutRight Namibia in Windhoek.

In November 2017, the first Namibian Lesbian Festival was held in Windhoek. More than sixty young lesbians from eight regions came together for a week of public performances and creative expression, with poetry, stories, music, drama and dance. The second edition of the festival occurred in November 2018.

A few denominations, including the Evangelical Lutheran Church in the Republic of Namibia, tolerate LGBTQ Christians. Madelene Isaacks, a lesbian Christian, started the faith-based organisation Tulinam to help create safe spaces for sexual minorities in Namibian churches.

=== Sexual assault and rape ===
As in South Africa, corrective gang rape of lesbians is common, leading lesbian associations to organize and protest against such actions.

== Political support ==
Support for LGBTQ rights among Namibian political parties is divided.

Parties that support LGBTQ rights include the All People's Party and the Popular Democratic Movement. Parties that oppose LGBTQ rights include the Namibian Economic Freedom Fighters and the SWAPO Party Youth League. Other parties such as Affirmative Repositioning have no official stance on the issue.

== Summary table ==
Same-sex sexual activity legal	Yes (Since 2024)
Equal age of consent (16)	Yes (Since 2024)
Anti-discrimination laws in employment only	No
Anti-discrimination laws in the provision of goods and services	No
Anti-discrimination laws in all other areas (Incl. indirect discrimination, hate speech)	No / Yes (hate speech ban based on sexual orientation, only in broadcasting)
Same-sex marriages	No
Recognition of same-sex couples	No (Limited recognition for marriages performed abroad from 2023 to 2024)
Stepchild adoption by same-sex couples	No
Joint adoption by same-sex couples	No
LGBTQ people allowed to serve openly in the military	No
Right to change legal gender	Yes (Sex reassignment surgery required)
Access to IVF for lesbians	No
Commercial surrogacy for gay male couples	No
MSMs allowed to donate blood	Yes

== See also ==
- LGBTQ rights in Africa
- Human rights in Africa
- Same-sex union court cases
