= Jholerina Brinnette Timbo =

Namibian transgender activist (1985–2025)

- Born: 7 September 1985
- Died: October 9, 2025 (aged 40)
- Citizenship: Namibia
- Occupation: Human rights activist
- Years active: 2015–2025
- Organization: Wings to Transcend Namibia
- Known for: Campaigning for transgender rights in Namibia

Jholerina Brinnette Theodora Timbo (7 September 1985 – 9 October 2025), also known as Madam Jholerina, was a Namibian human rights activist. She was the founder of Wings to Transcend Namibia, a transgender advocacy and lobbying group, serving as its chairperson between 2015 and 2020.

== Biography ==
Timbo was born on 7 September 1985 into a Christian family. Her father died in a car crash in 1997, following which she was raised by her mother and stepfather. After finishing her schooling, Timbo trained as a chef.

Timbo came out as a trans woman in 2008. She was supported by her mother and stepfather, with her mother later leaving the church Timbo was raised in when members discussed arranging a "witch hunt" for LGBTQ people. Inspired by Namibian trans activists, including Deyoncé and Mama Africa, in October 2015 Timbo launched the non-governmental organisation Wings to Transcend Namibia, based in Windhoek. Timbo described the organisation's mission as a transgender equivalent to the Namibian LGBTQ organisation Outright Namibia that lobbied local government, civil society groups and policymakers on the rights and needs of transgender people, as well as educating Namibians about gender and sexual orientation. Wings to Transcend Namibia was officially registered as an NGO in 2018.

Timbo criticised the lack of gender affirming care available in Namibia, as well as the lack of legal recognition of transgender people. She described responses to transgender people by officials, medical staff and police as being influenced by the Namibian government and the church in Namibia and their "promotion" of homophobia and transphobia. Through her role with Wings to Transcend Namibia, she has spoken at standing committees in the Namibian parliament, and submitted shadow papers to the United Nations on the experiences of the transgender community in Namibia.

In 2016, Timbo was part of the Young African Leaders Initiative by the United States' Department of State. In 2018, she was named a Mandela Washington Fellow. Timbo served on the grant making panel of the International Trans Fund in 2023 and 2024.

In June 2016, Timbo spoke at the inaugural edition of Swakopmund Gay Pride. In August 2019, she spoke at the launch of the Proudly African and Transgender exhibition at the University of the Western Cape in South Africa. During the COVID-19 pandemic, Timbo worked with medical staff to support them in their understanding and treatment of transgender patients.

Timbo praised the "younger generation" of LGBTQ activists, including Kourtney Reinecke, Omar van Reenen and Arila Garaj, as being "more radical" than her own generation, whom she described as being "very diplomatic".

Timbo died on 9 October 2025 at the age of 40, of undisclosed causes. Her death was announced by Wings to Transcend Namibia, who described her as the "heartbeat" of the transgender community in Namibia, and a "guiding light" of the country's LGBTQ movement. Equal Namibia described Timbo as a "trailblazer", stating her legacy "lived on" in the generation of younger transgender people she inspired.

Regionally, Pan Africa ILGA paid tribute to Timbo's leadership, courage and "unwavering belief" in justice. The International Trans Fund released a statement saying it was "deeply saddened" to learn of Timbo's death, and described her as an "elder" of the Namibian transgender community.
