= Polygamy in Namibia =

While polygamous marriages are not legally recognized under the civil marriage laws of Namibia, a bill was successfully passed in 2003, based on the model in South Africa, which recognizes polygamous unions under customary law; affording a generous amount of benefits to polygamous unions, ranging from inheritance rights to child custody. It has been estimated that nearly one in seven women in Namibia live in polygamous relationships, which has resulted in large numbers of unmarried men.

Since May 2009, a debate concerning legalizing civil polygamous marriages has been ongoing throughout the parliament in Namibia. The bill has faced both praise and fierce opposition. There have also been past attempts to outlaw polygamous marriages (including under customary law), which have received about an equal reaction. A bill that would have provided pension benefits to the spouses of a deceased polygamous president was voted down in 2004.

== See also ==
- Okujepisa omukazendu
