= LM & Others v Government of Namibia =

Legal case regarding coerced sterilisation

LM and Others v Government of the Republic of Namibia
- Court: High Court of Namibia
- Full case name: LM, MI and NH v The Government of the Republic of Namibia
- Decided: July 30, 2012
- Citations: LM and Others v Government of the Republic of Namibia, 211 (NAHC July 30, 2012). Government of the Republic of Namibia v LM and Others, 19 (NASC November 3, 2014).

Case history
- Appealed to: Supreme Court of Namibia
- Subsequent actions: Dismissed and High Court judgement upheld

Case opinions
- Written consent does not automatically equate to informed consent; Women did not understand what they were signing; A consent form could not absolve the hospitals from responsibility; The women are entitled to damages

LM & Others v Government of Namibia is a legal case regarding coerced sterilisation of three women in Namibia in 2005 and 2007. The women argued they had not properly consented to sterilisation due to not being informed of the contents of the consent form, not understanding the medical staff, or coercion by being told their caesareans would not be performed unless they consented to the sterilisation. All the women were HIV-positive and believe they were targeted for sterilization based on this.

In 2012, the Namibian High Court held that the women had been coercively sterilised. On appeal, the Supreme Court of Namibia upheld the High Court decision on 3 November 2014.

== Background ==
The three women applicants, of whom only the initials LM, MI, and NH were given, had been sterilised at the public Oshakati State and Katutura State Hospitals when giving birth via caesarean section. The women argued that any purported consent to the sterilisation had been coerced as they had either not been told the contents of the consent forms they were signing, did not understand the medical staff, or had been told by doctors that their caesarean surgeries would only be performed if they agreed to be sterilised.

All the women are HIV-positive and believe that they were stigmatised and targeted for sterilisation on the basis of their HIV status.

== Litigation ==
In 2009 the women, assisted by the Southern Africa Litigation Centre, the Namibia Women's Health Network and the Legal Assistance Centre, sued the government for damages, claiming that sterilisation without informed consent violates a number of rights. The women argued that the sterilisation infringed their constitutional rights to life, liberty, dignity and to found a family, as well as various common law and personality rights as it diminished their marriage prospects and ability to bear children, impacted on their bodily and psychological integrity and caused shock, pain and suffering and emotional anguish.

The women also argued that their rights to equality and freedom from discrimination were violated because the sterilisation was as a result of their HIV status.

The Namibian government denied that there was a policy to sterilise HIV positive women, and denied that the applicants’ consent to sterilisation had been coerced. The government accepted that coerced sterilisation would be a violation of the constitutional rights invoked by the women, but argued that the hospitals had obtained the women's consent correctly.

== High Court judgment ==
On 30 July 2012, Judge Elton Hoff held that the evidence presented by the women demonstrated that they had not given informed consent to the sterilisations. The High Court found that obtaining consent from the women when they were in labour or in extreme pain could not constitute informed consent. For it to be valid, consent must be clear and unequivocal and be given freely and voluntarily and not induced by fear, fraud or force. The Court held that written consent does not automatically equate to informed consent as the women did not understand what they were signing, and so the fact that the women had signed a consent form could not absolve the hospitals from responsibility.

The Judge held that the women were entitled to damages which would be determined at a later date.

== Supreme Court judgment ==
The Namibian government appealed the High Court decision to the Supreme Court. On 3 November 2014, the Supreme Court dismissed the appeal and referred the case back to the High Court for the amount of damages to be calculated. Writing for the Court, Chief Justice Peter Shivute distinguished written consent from informed consent that is given freely and voluntarily. The Court held that all three women had not given their informed consent to be sterilised due to the circumstances in which their consent had been obtained, including that they were all in varying degrees of labour at the time. The Supreme Court ruled, however, that there was no evidence for the women's HIV status to be the underlying reason for the sterilisation, and that no rule or policy existed that discriminated against HIV-positive patients.
