= Petrus Damaseb =

Namibian judge

Judge President of the High Court of Namibia
- Incumbent
- Assumed office 12 July 2004

Deputy Chief Justice of Namibia
- Incumbent
- Assumed office 12 July 2004

Personal details
- Born: Petrus Tileinge Damaseb; 26 June 1962 (age 64) Tsumeb, Oshikoto Region, South West Africa
- Spouse: Ngarandue T. Kandjou
- Education: University of Warwick
- Profession: Judge

Petrus Tileinge Damaseb (born 26 June 1962 in Tsumeb, Oshikoto Region) is a Namibian judge serving as the Judge President of the High Court of Namibia as well as the Deputy Chief Justice of the Supreme Court of Namibia.

== Education ==
Damaseb studied at schools in Tsumeb, Grootfontein and Uis prior to joining the liberation struggle and going into exile in Zambia. In Zambia, he studied at the United Nations Institute for Namibia (UNIN) and obtained a Diploma in Development Studies and Management with a focus on law. In 1984, he qualified as a magistrate through Zambia's National Institute of Public Administration in conjunction with UNIN. He then received a United Nations scholarship to study at the University of Warwick in the United Kingdom, where he graduated with an LLB (honours) degree.

== Career ==
Damaseb returned to Namibia in 1989, as the country prepared for its first democratic elections. From independence in 1990 to 1997, he served as a senior government official. He worked in a private practice from 1997 to 2004. In 2004, Damaseb was appointed a permanent judge of the High Court of Namibia. He has also been a judge of the SADC Tribunal. He served on the FIFA Ethics Committee and was Vice Chairman of Confederation of African Football (CAF) Appeal Board. He has also served as head of the Namibia Football Association. Justice Damaseb entered the legal profession in Namibia in 1995, he had served as Permanent Secretary in the Office of the Prime Minister, Cabinet Secretary and Secretary to the President.

=== Notable cases ===
- Kareeboomvloer massacre: Brothers Sylvester and Gavin Beukes murder the owners' couple of farm Kareeboomvloer and execute all witnesses, including two children. The trial lasted from 2007 to 2011.
