= Constitution of Namibia =

Supreme and fundamental law of Namibia

Constitution of the Republic of Namibia
- Coat of arms of Namibia

Overview
- Jurisdiction: Namibia
- Ratified: 9 February 1990
- Date effective: 21 March 1990
- System: Unitary Republic

Government structure
- Branches: Three (executive, legislature and judiciary)
- Chambers: Bicameral (Parliament)
- Executive: President and Cabinet
- Judiciary: Supreme Court and others
- Authors: Constituent Assembly of Namibia
- Signatories: President Sam Nujoma
- Supersedes: South-West Africa Constitution Act, 1968

Full text
- Constitution of Namibia at Wikisource

The Constitution of Namibia is the supreme law of the Republic of Namibia. Adopted on the 9th of February 1990, a month prior to Namibia's independence from apartheid South Africa. The constitution was drafted by the Constituent Assembly, which had been chosen through the UN certified 1989 Namibian parliamentary election.

== The constitutional process ==
The 1990 Constituent Assembly consisted of seven parties: SWAPO (41 members), the DTA (21), the UDF (4), the ACN (3), and one member each from the NPF, FCN, and NNF. While SWAPO had a clear majority, it did not achieve the two-thirds majority required for adopt the Constitutional Principles the party had proposed in 1982.

Instead, the Assembly agreed to use the 1982 Constitutional Principles as a framework for the new constitution during its first meeting on 21 November 1989. Within just three months, the parties successfully drafted the Constitution that reflected a broad consensus of views and ideas. The final debate on the draft was held on 6 February 1990, and the Constitution was formally adopted on 9 February 1990.

== Preamble ==
"Whereas recognition of the inherent dignity and the equal and inalienable rights of all members of the human family is indispensable for freedom, justice and peace; Whereas the said rights include the right of the individual to life, liberty and the pursuit of happiness, regardless of race, colour, ethnic origin, sex, religion, creed or social or economic status; Whereas the said rights are most effectively maintained and protected in a democratic society, where the government is responsible to freely elected representatives of the people, operating under a sovereign constitution and a free and independent judiciary; Whereas these rights have for so long been denied to the people of Namibia by colonialism, racism and apartheid; Whereas we the people of Namibia - have finally emerged victorious in our struggle against colonialism, racism and apartheid; are determined to adopt a Constitution which expresses for ourselves and our children our resolve to cherish and to protect the gains of our long struggle; desire to promote amongst all of us the dignity of the individual and the unity and integrity of the Namibian nation among and in association with the nations of the world; will strive to achieve national reconciliation and to foster peace, unity and a common loyalty to a single state; committed to these principles, have resolved to constitute the Republic of Namibia as a sovereign, secular, democratic and unitary State securing to all our citizens justice, liberty, equality, and fraternity. Now therefore, we the people of Namibia accept and adopt this Constitution as the fundamental law of our Sovereign and Independent Republic."

== Chapters ==
The Constitution consists of 21 chapters totalling 148 articles.

Chapter I The Republic

Article 1 Establishment of the Republic of Namibia and Identification of its Territory

Article 2 National Symbols

Article 3 Language

Chapter II Citizenship

Article 4 Acquisition and loss of Citizenship

Chapter III Fundamental Human Rights and Freedoms

Article 5 Protection of Fundamental Rights and Freedoms

Article 6 Protection of Life

Article 7 Protection and Liberty

Article 8 Respect for Human Dignity

Chapter IV Public Emergency, State of National Defence and Martial Law

Chapter V The President

Chapter VI The Cabinet

Chapter VII The National Assembly

Chapter VIII The National Council

Chapter IX The Administration of Justice

Chapter X The Ombudsman

Chapter XI Principles of State Policy

Chapter XII Regional and Local Government

Chapter XIII The Public Service Commission

Chapter XIV The Security Commission

Chapter XV The Police and Defence Forces and the Prison Service

Chapter XVI Finance

Chapter XVII Central Bank and National Planning Commission

Chapter XVIII Coming into Force of the Constitution

Chapter XX The Law in Force and Transitional Provisions

Chapter XXI Final Provisions

Chapter 2, consisting of the single Article 4, is the major source of Namibian nationality law.

== Amendments ==
There have been three amendments as of 2026.

The First Amendment Act of 1998 allowing the first President, Dr. Sam Nujoma to run for a third term.

The Second Amendment Act of 2010 addressing residency requirements, establishing the Anti-Corruption Commission and redefining the prison service.

Prior to the 2014 general elections, the Constitution was amended a third time to increase the size of the Parliament. The amendment saw an increase in the National Assembly from 78 seats (72 elected, 6 appointed by the President) to 104 seats (96 elected, 8 appointed). The National Council increased from 26 seats (two representatives from 13 regions) to 42 seats (three representatives from 14 regions, Kavango was split into Kavango East and Kavango West). This expansion was introduced to allow for wider representation of the population, although the real reason behind it was the newly introduced gender equality system of the ruling party SWAPO. This system would have pushed several male members out of parliament. These changes were approved against the votes of opposition parties, as SWAPO had a two-thirds majority in Parliament.
