= Judiciary of Namibia =

The judiciary of Namibia consists of a three-tiered set of courts, the Lower, High and Supreme Courts. Parallel to this structure there are traditional courts dealing with minor matters and applying customary law.

== Lower Courts ==
The Lower Courts are established by an act of Parliament and are bound by the four corners of legislation. There are several lower courts in Namibia, the magistrates' courts, the (labour) arbitration tribunals and the customary courts.

Magistrates' courts deal with the most cases in the entire legal system. They are manned by magistrates who are employed by the Ministry of Justice. The decisions of magistrates' courts are written down; however, they are not recorded in any law report. The decisions have to be written in case either party to the proceedings feel prejudiced by the outcome and wants to go on appeal or review to the High Court. They are created by the Magistrates' Court Act no. 32 of 1944. The magistrates are governed by the Magistrates Act 3 of 2003.

Arbitration tribunals are established by section 85 of the Labour Act No. 11 of 2007. Arbitration tribunals operate under the auspices of the Labour Commissioner. They deal with labour disputes, mainly arising from alleged contraventions of the Labour Act.

The regional courts are the least used lower courts, and are slowly becoming obsolete.

== High Court ==
The High Court is situated in the capital Windhoek but may, at the discretion of the Judge President, hold its sessions elsewhere in the country. The High Court building in the Windhoek Central Business District was inaugurated in 1960.

The High Court exercises original jurisdiction. It can act both as a court of appeal and a court of first instance over civil and criminal prosecutions and in cases concerning the interpretation, implementation and preservation of the Constitution. The High Court is presided over by the Judge-President. A full sitting of the High Court consists of the Judge-President and 6 other judges. Its jurisdiction with regard to appeals shall be determined by Acts of Parliament. Decisions of the High Court, which bind lower courts, are recorded both in Namibian and South African law reports. The decisions are recorded and summarized in the same way as Supreme Court decisions.

The Labour Court is a division of the High Court. The Judge-President must assign suitable judges to the Labour Court, each of whom must be a judge or an acting judge of the High Court.

== Supreme Court ==
The Supreme Court is the highest national forum of appeal. It has inherent jurisdiction over all legal matters in Namibia. It adjudicates, according to article 79 of the Constitution, appeals emanating from the High Court, including appeals which involve the interpretation, implementation and upholding of the Constitution and the fundamental rights and freedoms guaranteed therein. It also hears matters referred to it by the Attorney General or authorized by an Act of Parliament. As Namibia has a system of stare decisis, all decisions emanating from the Supreme Court are binding on all other courts unless they are reversed by an Act of Parliament or the Supreme Court itself. Decisions of the Supreme Court of Namibia are all recorded in the Namibian law reports and some in South African law reports.

== Traditional courts ==
Community courts, which apply customary law, were created by the Community Courts Act 10 of 2003. Matters are decided by traditional leaders in the presence of the community. This road of dispute resolution has been formalised in acknowledgment of custom and culture, and to allow official access to some legal procedure for people who cannot afford to access the mainstream courts. Community courts may only adjudicate civil cases, and all parties must agree to be subject to it.

Prior to the official recognition of traditional law in Namibia, these courts operated informally without recognition as part of the legal system. These developments are an extension of art 66 of the Constitution which holds that both the customary law and the common law of Namibia in force on the date of Independence shall remain valid to the extent to which such customary or common law does not conflict with this Constitution or any other statutory law. The courts have no reporting system, as the laws that they apply are very dynamic and may not be applied the same in any number of cases heard before them.
