= Supreme Court of Namibia =

National supreme court

Coordinates: 22.5689°S 17.0861°E

Supreme Court
- Established: 21 March 1990
- Location: Windhoek, Khomas Region, Namibia
- Composition method: Presidential appointment after consultation with the Judicial Service Commission
- Authorised by: Constitution of Namibia
- Judge term length: May serve until the age of 65 (extendable to the age of 70 by the President)
- Number of positions: 5
- Website: ejustice.jud.na

Chief Justice of Namibia
- Currently: Peter Shivute
- Since: 1 December 2004

Deputy Chief Justice of Namibia
- Currently: Petrus Damaseb
- Since: 12 July 2004

The Supreme Court of Namibia is the highest court in the judicial system of Namibia. It is the court of last resort and the highest appellate court in the country. It is located in the city centre of Namibia's capital city, Windhoek. A Supreme Court decision is supreme in that it can only be reversed by an Act of Parliament that contradicts it, or by another ruling of the Supreme Court itself.

== History ==
Namibia's Supreme Court was founded on 21 March 1990, the day of Namibian Independence. Although it has the Supreme Court of South West Africa as its predecessor, the latter was not a supreme court in the sense that appeals against its rulings would be allowed; the Appellate Division of the Supreme Court of South Africa would hear those, and they would be prosecuted by the Supreme Court of South-West Africa.

== Court building ==
At its inception in 1990, the Supreme Court did not have its own building. The Supreme Court building, situated in Michael Scott Street on Eliakim Namundjebo Plaza in central Windhoek, was built between 1994 and 1996 as an "imposing and functional building" to represent "the integrity and soul of the [...] Constitution". It was designed in a north African style in order to avoid resemblance of European colonial buildings, and it is Windhoek's only building erected post-independence in an African style of architecture. The building was constructed to contain two court rooms, four offices for justices, and a law library on the first floor. Erection and design of the building involved extensive geotechnical investigations because it is situated on top of a geological fault.

== Mandate and power ==
The mandate and powers of the Supreme Court are regulated by Articles 78, 79 and 138 of the Namibian Constitution. It hears appeals against High Court decisions and matters referred from the Attorney General, particularly those that concern constitutional matters. It can also hear matters referred to it by parliamentary authorisation. The Supreme Court regulates its own procedures and makes Rules of Court.

A Supreme Court decision can only be reversed by an Act of Parliament that contradicts it, or by another ruling of the Supreme Court itself.

== Structure and appointment ==
The Chief Justice of Namibia presides over the Supreme Court. They are supported by Judges of Appeal. All Supreme Court judges are appointed by the president on recommendation by the Judicial Service Commission. The current Chief Justice is His Lordship Peter Shivute.

== Notable cases ==
- In 1991, the court confirmed the prohibition of corporal punishment at state schools. It also clarified that this prohibition applies independent of parent's approval or disapproval of the measurement, and even if the pupil themselves agree to be punished in this way.
- In 2001, when deciding a state appeal on a granted residence permit (Chairperson of the Immigration Selection Board v Frank and Another), the court noted: "The homosexual relationship, whether between men and men and women and women, clearly fall outside the scope and intent of Article 14" of the Constitution of Namibia (protection of the family).
- In a civil matter spinning off from the Caprivi treason trial the Supreme Court of Namibia ordered government in 2002 (Government of Namibia and Others v Mwilima and Others) to provide the treason suspects with legal representation. In 2010, the court was again involved in this trial, ruling (State vs. Malumo and 24 Others) that confessions from 25 accused are inadmissible before the High Court in Windhoek due to the occurrence of "coercive actions" at the hands of Police or military to obtain the testimonies.
- In 2009, the Supreme Court found that a 2000 agreement on the expansion of the coastal holiday settlement of Wlotzkasbaken (Erongo Regional Council and Others v Wlotzkasbaken Home Owners Association and Another) was unilaterally and unlawfully changed by the Erongo Regional Council, and decided in favour of the home owners.
- In November 2014, the court upheld a decision by the High Court in LM & Others v Government of Namibia that three women had been coercively sterilised in state hospitals.
- In February 2018, the court ruled that it is unconstitutional to sentence offenders for so long that there is "no realistic prospect of release in the sense of fully engaging in society again—if at all—during their life times". In 2012, in the amended Correctional Service Act, the provisions of life sentences had been changed such that a person becomes eligible for parole only after 25 years and not after 10 years as previously administered. The Supreme Court ruled that, if a court chooses not to hand out a life sentence, it cannot use this mechanism to impose a longer effective sentence. The longest prison sentence that henceforth may be given in Namibia is 37.5 years, which will make a prisoner eligible for parole after two thirds (25 years) as in a life sentence.
- In February 2020, the court ruled on a case emanating from the 2019 Namibian general election. It resolved that the use of electronic voting machines (EVMs) without a Verifiable Paper Trail (VPPT) contravenes the Electoral Act of 2014, and that the decision to use EVMs without providing the paper trail as required by the act, is unconstitutional because it violates the separation of powers. The court, however, declined to set aside the elections carried out using such failed process, as there were no indications the devices were tampered with. This has attracted some controversy.
- In May 2023, the court directed that same-sex marriages concluded outside Namibia must be recognised due to constitutional rights to equality and dignity. It also commented on its 2001 decision, stating that the remarks on the protection of the family not including homosexual relationships were "peripheral and subsidiary remarks not necessary for that decision and thus [...] not binding". The decision, marked as "historic", "groundbreaking", and a "landmark judgment" was celebrated by Namibia's LGBT community but attacked by religious and political leaders.
