= Squatting in Namibia =

Occupation of unused land or derelict buildings without the permission of the owner

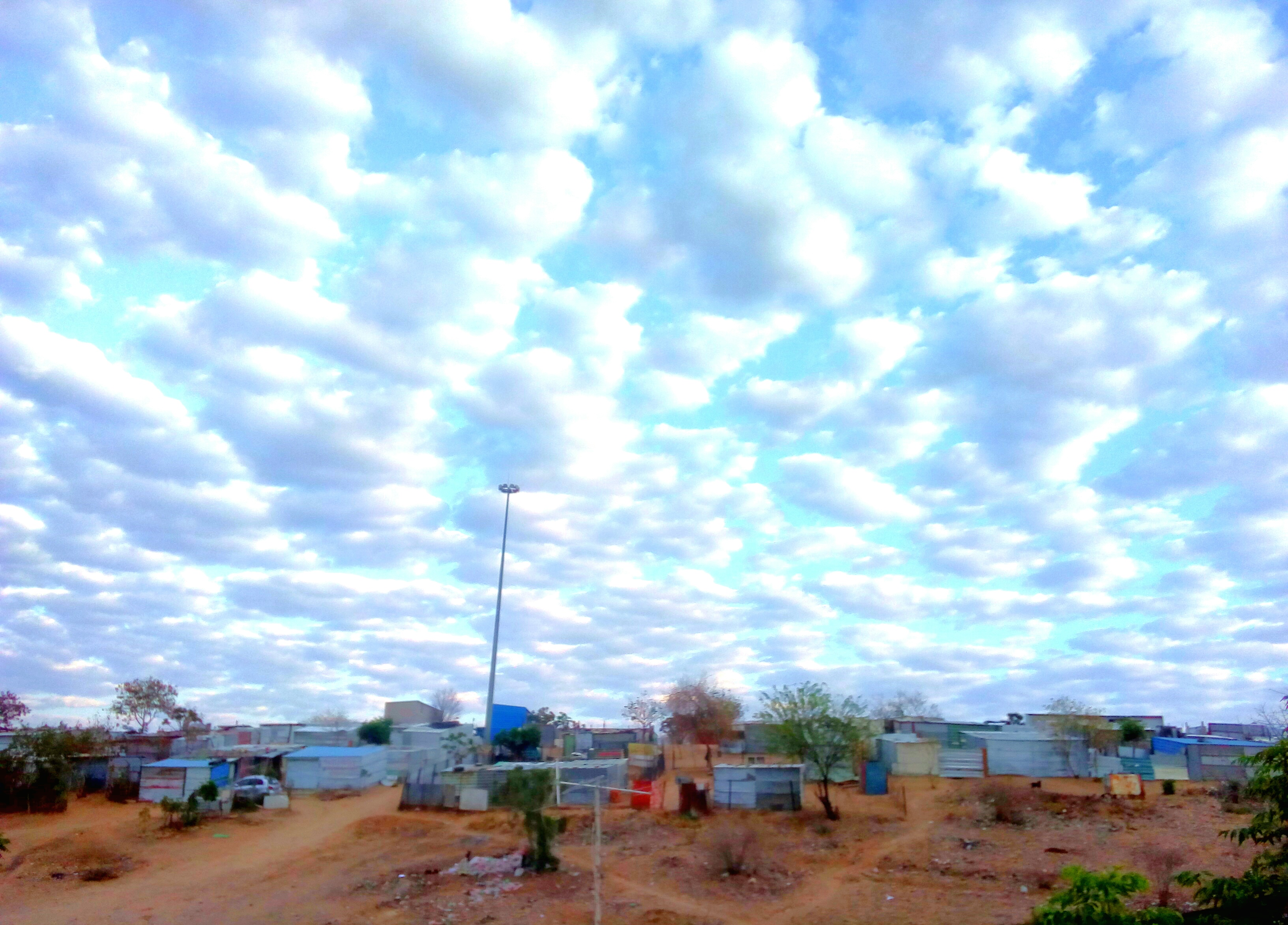
Shacks in Katatura, Windhoek

Squatting in Namibia is the occupation of unused land or derelict buildings without the permission of the owner. European settlers arrived in the nineteenth century and acquired land, leaving only 38 per cent of land in indigenous hands by 1902. This led to squatting and the Herero Wars, which ended with the Herero and Namaqua genocide. After Namibian independence in 1990, squatting increased as people migrated to the cities and land reform became a goal for those who had participated in the liberation struggle. By 2020, 401,748 people were living in 113 informal settlements across the country. Squatting continues to be regulated by the Squatters Proclamation of 1985; a challenge to this law was dismissed by the High Court in 2023.

== History ==
=== Colonial times ===
In pre-colonial times there was no notion of formal land ownership in South West Africa, and thus the concept of squatting did not apply. The dispossession of land from Africans by European settlers began in the nineteenth century with the coming of the German Empire and the area was incorporated as German South West Africa. The colonialists made deals with indigenous peoples for land ownership so that by 1902, only 38 per cent of the total land still belonged to the indigenous community. Tensions over land caused the Herero Wars, which ended with the Herero and Namaqua genocide. In 1915, South Africa occupied the colony (ruling it until 1990 as South West Africa) and imposed the apartheid system, which gave land to white farmers and dispossessed black Namibians of their ancestral lands. The Native Administrations Proclamation of 1922, set repressive measures for workers and also criminalised the squatting of privately owned land and by 1926, 7.5 million hectares had been allotted to 1,106 white farmers. The 1962 Commission of Enquiry into South West Africa Affairs continuing to enforce apartheid. Namibia was divided along ethnic lines: ten bantustans were established, the remaining territory, including much of the agriculturally viable land, was reserved for Whites.

=== Post-independence ===
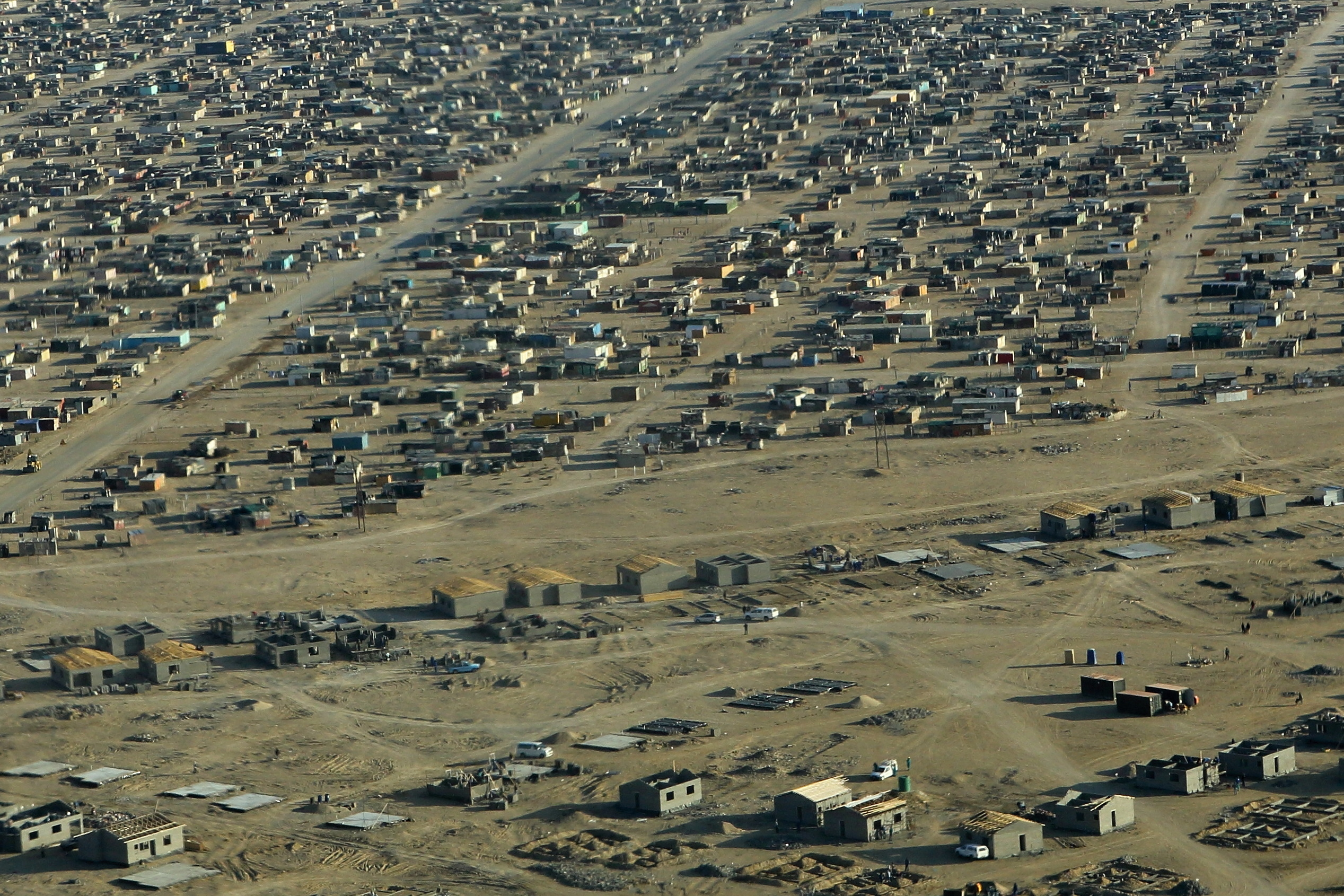
An informal settlement in Swakopmund

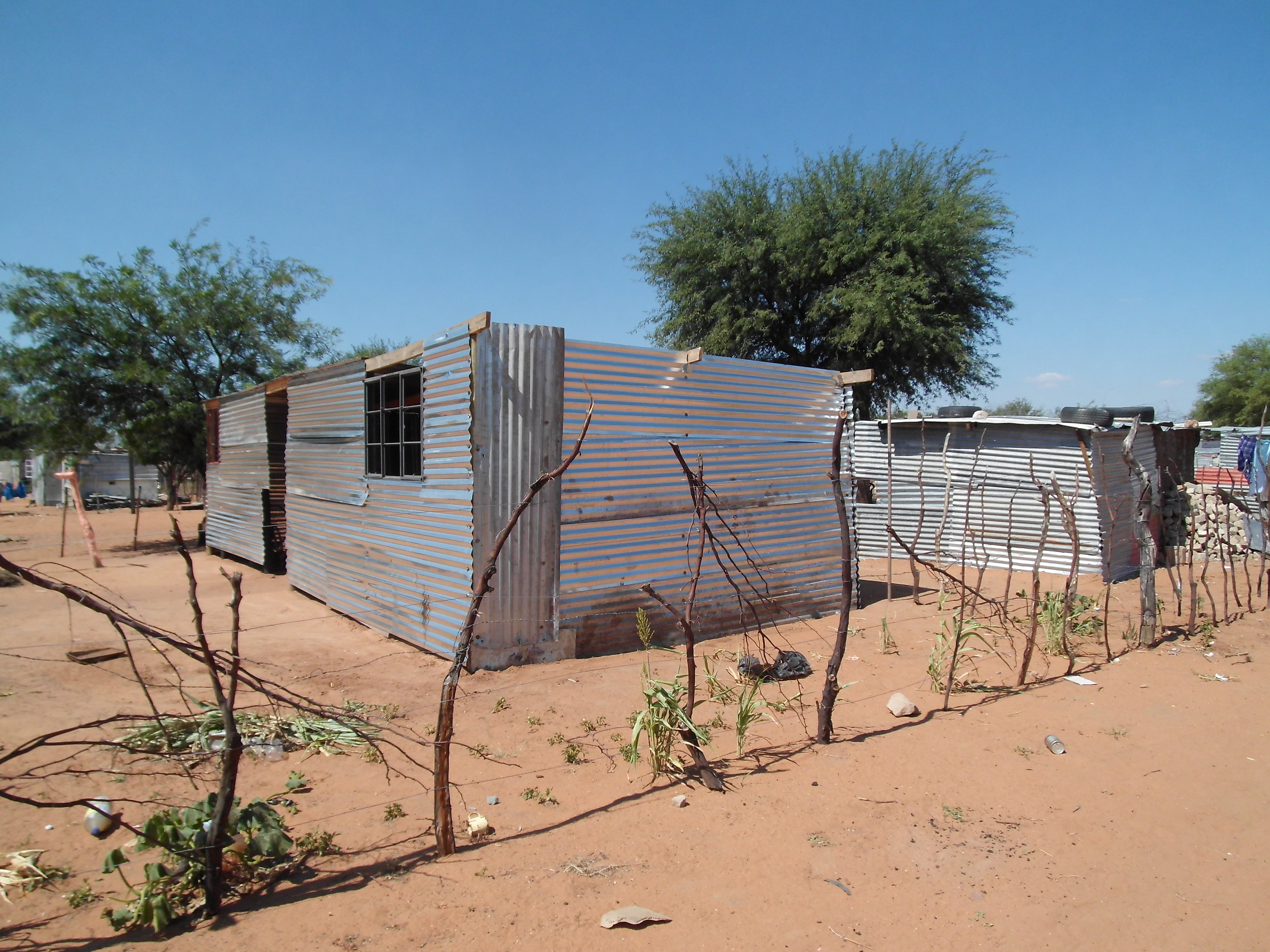
A shack in Gobabis

When Namibia gained independence in March 1990, the country inherited a division of land in which 3,500 farmers, who were almost entirely Whites, owned approximately 50 per cent of the country's agricultural land. These farmers constituted 0.2 per cent of the total national population. Land reform became one of the largest goals for many who participated in Namibia's liberation struggle. At the same time the informal settlements began to grow; in the twenty-first century, squatting in Namibia most often occurs when poor migrants from the rural north move to the capital Windhoek and live in such settlements. Squatters in the Vergenoeg shanty town on the edge of Okahandja were told in 2019 they had to make way for a new highway between Okahandja and Windhoek; five thousand people were affected.

Government plans to upgrade settlements have been criticised by squatters who either have been moved to a temporary site then not resettled or have not received promised improvements. In Havana in Windhoek, there were many cases of Hepatitis E in 2018. During the COVID-19 pandemic, squatters in Outjo voiced concern about finding food and firewood during lockdown.

In 2020, the Harambee Prosperity Plan 2 was released. It declared that 401,748 people were living in 113 informal settlements across the country. Almost 100,000 of these people lived in Windhoek, 76,068 in Rundu, 52,870 in Otjiwarongo, 35,452 in Oshakati, over 24,000 in Swakopmund and Walvis Bay, over 13,000 in Rehoboth, 11,400 in Tsumeb, 8,670 in Nkurenkuru and 8,090 in Gobabis.

== Legality ==
Squatting is regulated by the Squatters Proclamation, AG 21 of 1985, although certain sections were struck out as unconstitutional following Shaanika and Others v Windhoek City Police and Others in 2013. Dimbulukeni Nauyoma, a land activist, launched a challenge to the proclamation in 2020, claiming it was entirely unconstitutional. Nauyoma had been arrested the previous year for resisting an eviction in Windhoek. In 2023, the High Court dismissed the challenge, saying it had not specified which parts of the proclamation were violating human rights. Nauyoma's lawyers said they would appeal to the Supreme Court.

== See also ==
- Flexible Land Tenure System (Namibia)
- Poverty in Namibia
