= Apertura feudi =

Loss of a feudal land tenure

Apertura feudi, in ancient law books, denotes the loss of a feudal land tenure, by default of issue to him, to whom the feud or fee was first granted.
