= Land tenure =

Legal regime in which area owned by an individual is held by another person

In common law systems, land tenure, from the French verb "tenir" meaning "to hold", is the legal regime in which land "owned" by an individual is possessed by someone else who is said to "hold" the land, based on an agreement between both individuals. It determines who can use land, for how long and under what conditions. Tenure may be based both on official laws and policies, and on informal local customs (insofar higher law allows it). In other words, land tenure implies a system according to which land is held by an individual or the actual tiller of the land but this person does not have legal ownership. It determines the holder's rights and responsibilities in connection with their holding. The sovereign monarch, known in the United Kingdom as the Crown, held land in its own right. All land holders are either its tenants or sub-tenants. Tenure signifies a legal relationship between tenant and lord, arranging the duties and rights of tenant and lord in relationship to the land. Over history, many different forms of land tenure, i.e., ways of holding land, have been established.

A land claim is "the pursuit of recognized territorial ownership by a group or individual", usually only used with respect to disputed or unresolved ownership cases. A landowner is the holder of the estate in land with the most extensive and exclusive rights of ownership over the territory; simply put, the owner of land.

== Feudal tenure ==
The legal concept of land tenure in the Middle Ages has become known as the feudal system that has been widely used throughout Europe, the Middle East and Asia Minor. The lords who received land directly from the Crown, or another landowner, in exchange for certain rights and obligations were called tenants-in-chief.

They doled out portions of their land to lesser tenants who in turn divided it among even lesser tenants. This process—that of granting subordinate tenancies—is known as subinfeudation. In this way, all individuals except the monarch did hold the land "of" someone else because legal ownership was with the (superior) monarch, also known as overlord or suzerain.

Historically, it was usual for there to be reciprocal duties and rights between lord and tenant. There were different kinds of tenure to fit various kinds of need. For instance, a military tenure might be by knight-service, requiring the tenant to supply the lord with a number of armed horsemen and ground troops.

The fees were often lands, land revenue or revenue-producing real property, typically known as fiefs or fiefdoms. Over the ages, and depending on the region, a broad variety of customs developed based on the same legal principle. The famous Magna Carta for instance was a legal contract based on the medieval system of land tenure.

The concept of tenure has since evolved into other forms, such as leases and estates.

== Modes of ownership and tenure ==
There is a great variety of modes of land ownership and tenure.

=== Traditional land tenure ===
Most of the indigenous nations or tribes of North America had differing notions of land ownership. Whereas European land ownership centered around control, Indigenous notions were based on stewardship. When Europeans first came to North America, they sometimes disregarded traditional land tenure and simply seized land, or they accommodated traditional land tenure by recognizing it as aboriginal title. This theory formed the basis for treaties with indigenous peoples.

=== Ownership of land by swearing to make productive use of it ===
In several developing countries, such as Egypt and Senegal, this method is still presently in use. In Senegal, it is mentioned as "mise en valeur des zones du terroir" and in Egypt, it is called Wadaa al-yad.

=== Allodial title ===
Allodial title is a system in which real property is owned absolutely free and clear of any superior landlord or sovereign. True allodial title is rare, with most property ownership in the common law world (Australia, Canada, Ireland, New Zealand, United Kingdom, United States) being in fee simple. Allodial title is inalienable, in that it may be conveyed, devised, gifted, or mortgaged by the owner, but it may not be distressed and restrained for collection of taxes or private debts, or condemned (eminent domain) by the government.

=== Feudal land tenure ===
Feudal land tenure is a system of mutual obligations under which a royal or noble personage granted a fiefdom — some degree of interest in the use or revenues of a given parcel of land — in exchange for a claim on services such as military service or simply maintenance of the land in which the lord continued to have an interest. This pattern obtained from the level of high nobility as vassals of a monarch down to lesser nobility whose only vassals were their serfs.

=== Fee simple ===
Under common law, Fee simple is the most complete ownership interest one can have in real property, other than the rare Allodial title. The holder can typically freely sell or otherwise transfer that interest or use it to secure a mortgage loan. This picture of "complete ownership" is, of course, complicated by the obligation in most places to pay a property tax and by the fact that if the land is mortgaged, there will be a claim on it in the form of a lien. In modern societies, this is the most common form of land ownership. Land can also be owned by more than one party and there are various concurrent estate rules.

=== Native title ===
In Australia, native title is a common law concept that recognizes that some indigenous people have certain land rights that derive from their traditional laws and customs. Native title can co-exist with non-indigenous proprietary rights and in some cases different indigenous groups can exercise their native title over the same land. There are approximately 160 registered determinations of native title, spanning some 16% of Australia's land mass. The case of Mabo overturned the decision in Milirrpum and repudiated the notion of terra nullius. Subsequent Parliamentary Acts passed recognised the existence of this common law doctrine.

=== Life estate ===
Under common law, Life estate is an interest in real property that ends at death. The holder has the use of the land for life, but typically no ability to transfer that interest or to use it to secure a mortgage loan.

=== Fee tail ===
Under common law, fee tail is hereditary, non-transferable ownership of real property. A similar concept, the legitime, exists in civil and Roman law; the legitime limits the extent to which one may disinherit an heir.

=== Leasehold ===
Under both common law and civil law, land may be leased or rented by its owner to another party. A wide range of arrangements are possible, ranging from very short terms to the 99-year leases common in the United Kingdom for flats, and allowing various degrees of freedom in the use of the property.

=== Common land ===
Rights to use a common may include such rights as the use of a road or the right to graze one's animals on commonly owned land.

Today, groups of people who practice communal land use include, for example, the traditional peoples and communities in Brazil such as fundos de pasto and faxinais.

=== Sharecropping ===
When sharecropping, one has use of agricultural land owned by another person in exchange for a share of the resulting crop or livestock.

=== Easement ===
Easements allow one to make certain specific uses of land owned by someone else. The most classic easement is right-of-way (right to cross), but it could also include (for example) the right – known as a wayleave – to run an electrical power line across someone else's land.

=== Other ===
In addition, there are various forms of collective ownership, which typically take either the form of membership in a cooperative, or shares in a corporation, which owns the land (typically by fee simple, but possibly under other arrangements). There are also various hybrids; in many communist states, government ownership of most agricultural land has combined in various ways with tenure for farming collectives.

== In archaeology ==
In archaeology, traditions of land tenure can be studied according to territoriality and through the ways in which people create and utilize landscape boundaries, both natural and constructed. Less tangible aspects of tenure are harder to qualify, and study of these relies heavily on either the anthropological record (in the case of pre-literate societies) or textual evidence (in the case of literate societies).

In archaeology, land tenure traditions can be studied across the longue durée, for example land tenure based on kinship and collective property management. This makes it possible to study the long-term consequences of change and development in land tenure systems and agricultural productivity.

Moreover, an archaeological approach to land tenure arrangements studies the temporal aspects of land governance, including their sometimes temporary, impermanent and negotiable aspects as well as uses of past forms of tenure. For example, people can lay claim to, or profess to own resources, through reference to ancestral memory within society. In these cases, the nature of and relationships with aspects of the past, both tangible (e.g. monuments) and intangible (e.g. concepts of history through story telling) are used to legitimize the present.

== By country ==
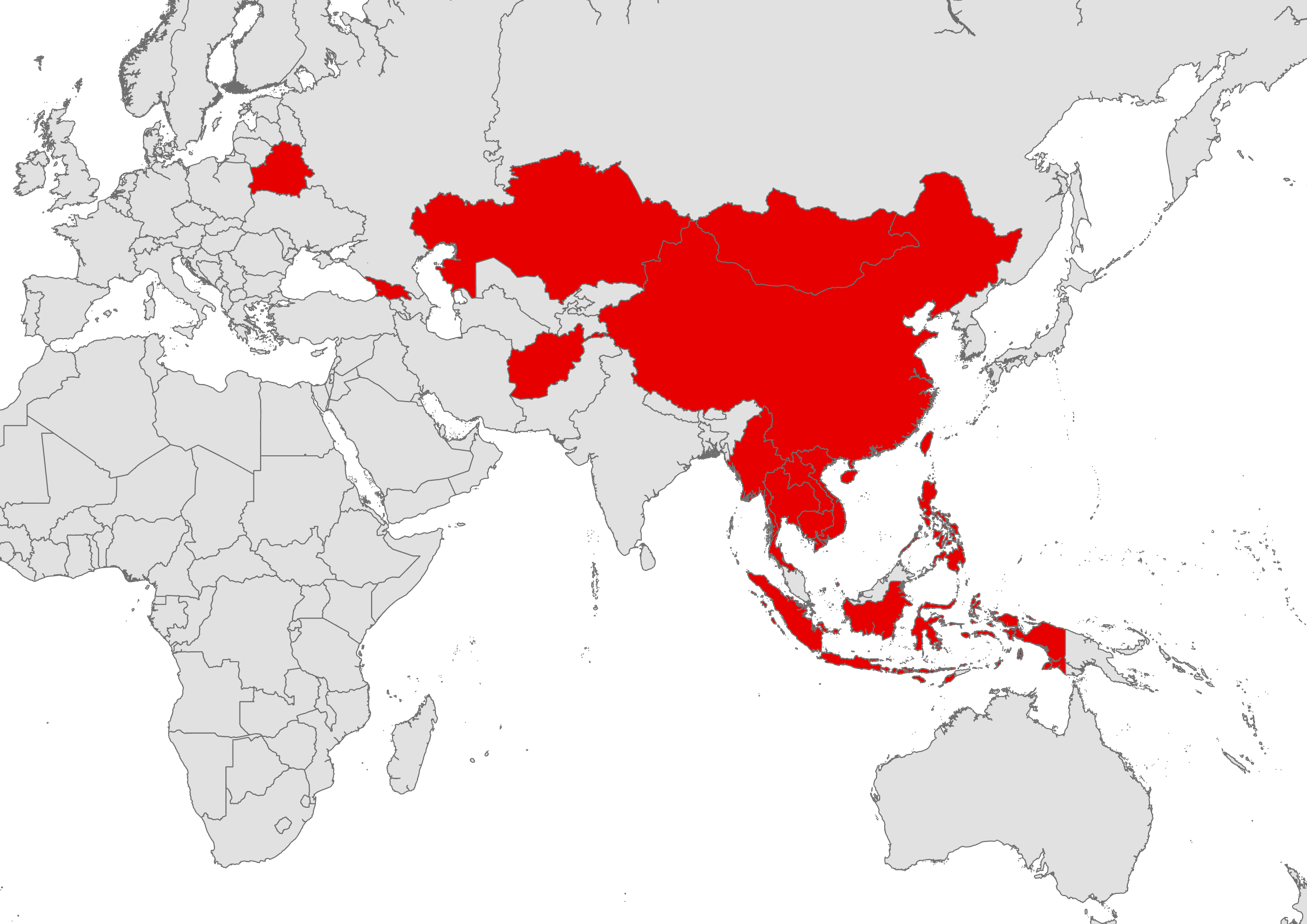
Map of countries where foreign land ownership is banned as of 2023

=== Afghanistan ===
41 of the Constitution of Afghanistan, foreigners are not allowed to own land. Foreign individuals shall not have the right to own immovable property in Afghanistan

=== China ===
Land in China is state-owned or collectively owned. Enterprises, farmers, and householders lease land from the state using long-term leases of 20 to 70 years. Foreign investors are not allowed to buy or own land in China.

=== Thailand ===
In Thailand foreigners are normally prohibited to own or possess land in Thailand. These restrictions are covered in the land code, articles 96 and following.

=== Cambodia ===
Under Article 44 of the Cambodian Constitution, "only natural persons or legal entities of Khmer nationality shall have the right to land ownership." foreigners are prohibited to own or possess land in Cambodia.

=== Philippines ===
Foreigners are prohibited owning land in the Philippines under the 1987 Constitution.

=== Indonesia ===
Foreigners are not allowed to own freehold land in Indonesia.

=== Vietnam ===
Foreigners cannot buy and own land, like in many other Southeast Asian countries. Instead, the land is collectively owned by all Vietnamese people, but governed by the state. As written in the national Land Law, foreigners and foreign organizations are allowed to lease land. The leasehold period is up to 50 years.

=== Burma ===
Though purchase of land is not permitted to foreigners, a real estate investor may apply for a 70-year leasehold with a Myanmar Investment Commission (MIC) permit.

=== Belarus ===
According to the legislation of Belarus, a foreign citizen cannot own land and only has the right to rent it.

=== Laos ===
As foreigners are prohibited from permanent ownership of land. Foreigners can only lease land for a period of up to 30 year.

=== Mongolia ===
Only Mongolian citizens can own the land within the territory of Mongolia. foreign citizens can only lease the land.

=== Maldives ===
Foreigners are not allowed to own freehold land in Maldives. the land can only be leased to foreigners for 99 years.

=== Sri Lanka ===
In 2014, the Sri Lankan parliament passed a law banning land purchases by foreigners. The new act will allow foreigners to acquire land only on a lease basis of up to 99 years with an annual 15 percent tax on the total rental paid upfront.

=== Georgia ===
Since 2017, A ban on foreigners owning farmland was introduced in the Georgia's new constitution. The new constitution states that, with a small number of exceptions, agricultural land can only be owned by the state, a Georgian citizen or a Georgian-owned entity.

=== Kazakhstan ===
In 2021, President Kassym-Jomart Tokayev signed into law a bill that bans the selling and leasing of agricultural land to foreigners.

=== Israel ===
Approximately 7% of the allocated land in Israel is privately owned. The rest, i.e. 93%, is owned by the State and is known as "Israeli Land". Israel's Basic Law on real estate states that Israel's Land is jointly owned by the State (69%), the Development Authority (12%), and the Jewish National Fund (12%).

=== Ireland ===
- Land and Conveyancing Law Reform Bill, 2006

=== United Kingdom ===
==== England and Wales ====
- Land tenure in England
- English land law
- History of English land law

==== Scotland ====
- Crofting
- Aoghairean
- Half-foot

== Importance of modern tenure ==
With homelessness and wealth inequality on the rise, land tenure in the developed world has become a point of issue. Market-based economies which treat housing as a commodity and not a right allow for laws such as California Proposition 13 (1978) that incentivize treating housing as an investment. Due to inelastic demand of the human need for shelter, housing prices can therefore be raised above universally-affordable rates. This complicates tenure by limiting supply and exacerbating homelessness and informal housing arrangements. For instance, in the United States, minimal regulation on house flipping and rent-seeking behavior allows for gentrification, pricing out half a million Americans and leaving them homeless.

At the same time, severe weather events caused by climate-change have become more frequent, affecting property values.

In the developing world, catastrophes are impacting greater numbers of people due to urbanization, crowding, and weak tenure and legal systems.

Colonial land-tenure systems have led to issues in post-colonial societies.

The concepts of "landlord" and "tenant" have been recycled to refer to the modern relationship of the parties to land which is held under a lease. Professor F.H. Lawson in Introduction to the Laws of Property (1958) has pointed out, however, that the landlord-tenant relationship never really fitted in the feudal system and was rather an "alien commercial element".

The doctrine of tenure did not apply to personalty (personal property). However, the relationship of bailment in the case of chattels closely resembles the landlord-tenant relationship that can be created in land.

Secure land-tenure also recognizes one's legal residential status in urban areas and it is a key characteristic in slums. Slum-dwellers do not have legal title to the land and thus local governments usually marginalize and ignored them.

In 2012, the Committee on World Food Security based at the Food and Agriculture Organization (FAO) of the United Nations, endorsed the Voluntary Guidelines on the Responsible Governance of Tenure as the global norm, as the problem of poor and politically marginalized especially likely to suffer from insecure tenure, however, this is merely work in progress. The United Nations Sustainable Development Goal 5 also advocates for reforms to give women access to ownership and control over land in recognition of the importance of tenure to resource distribution.

== See also ==
- Alienated land – Legal terminology
- Allodial title – Ownership independent of a superior
- Apertura feudi – Loss of a feudal land tenure
- Concentration of land ownership – Ownership of land in a particular area by a small number of people or organizations
- Development easement
- Eminent domain – Legal power of a government to take private property for public use
- Feudalism – Legal and military structure in medieval Europe
- Fiefdom – Right granted by overlord to vassal, central element of feudalism
- Flexible Land Tenure System (Namibia)
- History of English land law – Law of real property in England
- Homestead principle – Legal principle regarding unclaimed natural resources
- Land (economics) – Use of land as capital for production
- Land administration
- Land grabbing – Large-scale acquisition of land
- Landed gentry – British and Irish social class of wealthy land owners
- Landed nobility – Nobility privileged with landownership
- Landed property – Income-generating land owned by gentry
- Land reform – Changing of laws, regulations, or customs regarding land ownership
- Land titling – Assignment of land ownership to its occupants
- Land trust – Conservation organization
- Lord paramount – Feudal overlord: a lord with no obligations to a higher lord
- Manorialism – Economic, political, and judicial institution during the Middle Ages in Europe
- Mesne lord – Type of lord in the feudal system
- Open field system – Prevalent ownership and land use structure in medieval agriculture
- Possession (law) – Control a person intentionally exercises towards a thing
- Precaria – Form of land tenure
- Quia Emptores – English statute of 1290
- Rights and Resources Initiative – International non-governmental organization focused on land and forest rights
- Squatting – Unauthorized occupation of property
- Tenement (law) – Holder of a legal interest in real estate
- Title (property) – Bundle of rights to a property
- Usucaption – Acquisition of property
