= Poverty in Namibia =

Poverty in Namibia is common with an unemployment rate of 29.9%, poverty incidence of 26.9% and HIV prevalence of 16.9%. Namibia has an economic growth rates averaging 4.3% according to the World Bank, and is one of nine nations in Africa classified by the World Bank as upper center pay. However, income disparity in the country is one of the world's highest with a Gini coefficient of 59.1 in 2015 (2017: 61.3), and there were 3,300 US$ millionaires in 2017.

In a 2021 report by the governmental Namibia Statistics Agency, multidimensional poverty was determined to affect 43% of the population, 59% in rural and 25% in urban areas. The poorest regions per this measure were Kavango West (80%), Kavango East (70%) and Kunene Region (64%), while the lowest rates of poverty were found in Erongo (16%) and ǁKaras (21%).

More than 400,000 people live in informal housing, with Windhoek (100,000 shack dwellers), Rundu (76,000) and Otjiwarongo (53,000) accommodating the largest number.

== See also ==
- Squatting in Namibia
