= Flexible Land Tenure System (Namibia) =

Informal settlements in Namibia

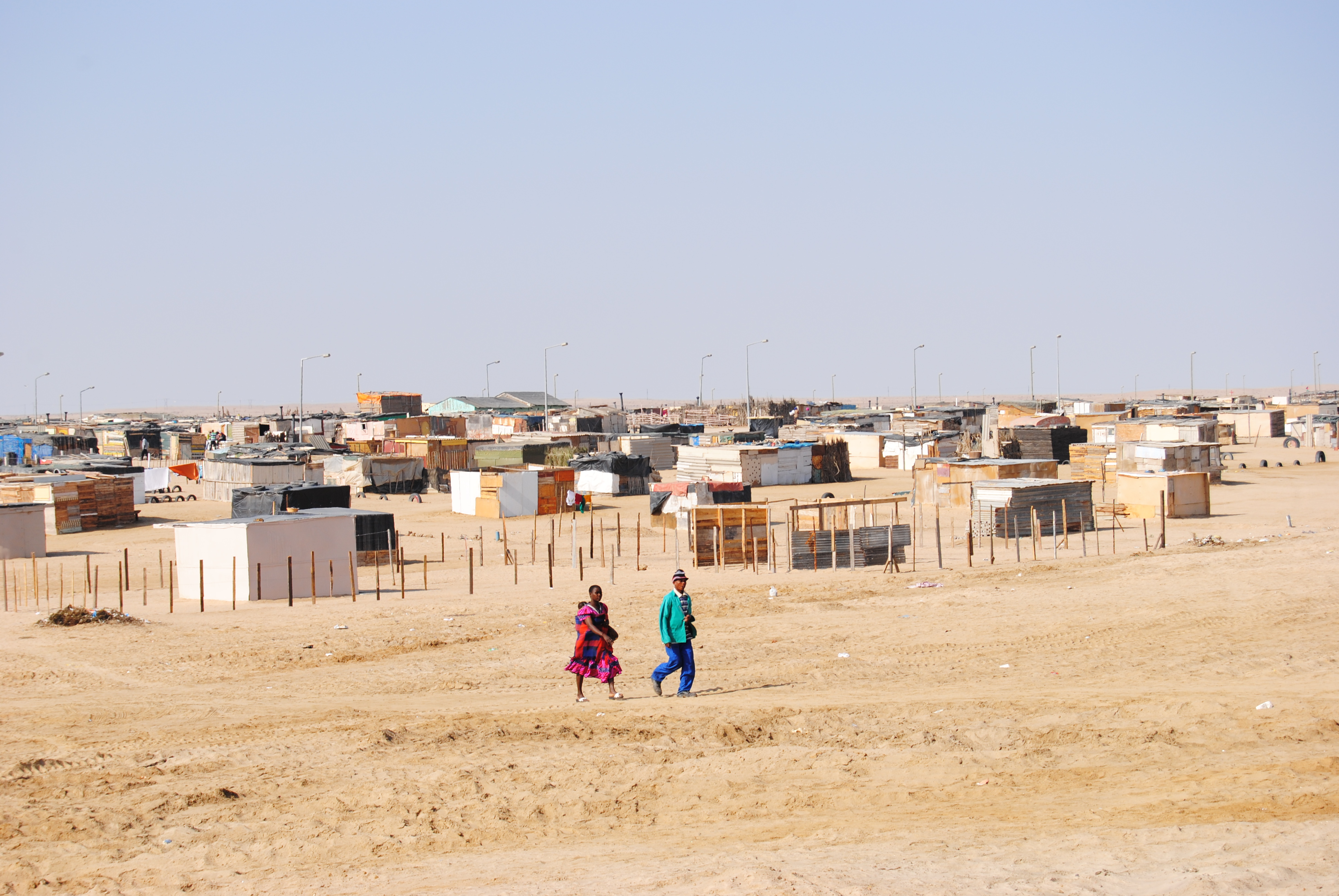
Namibia

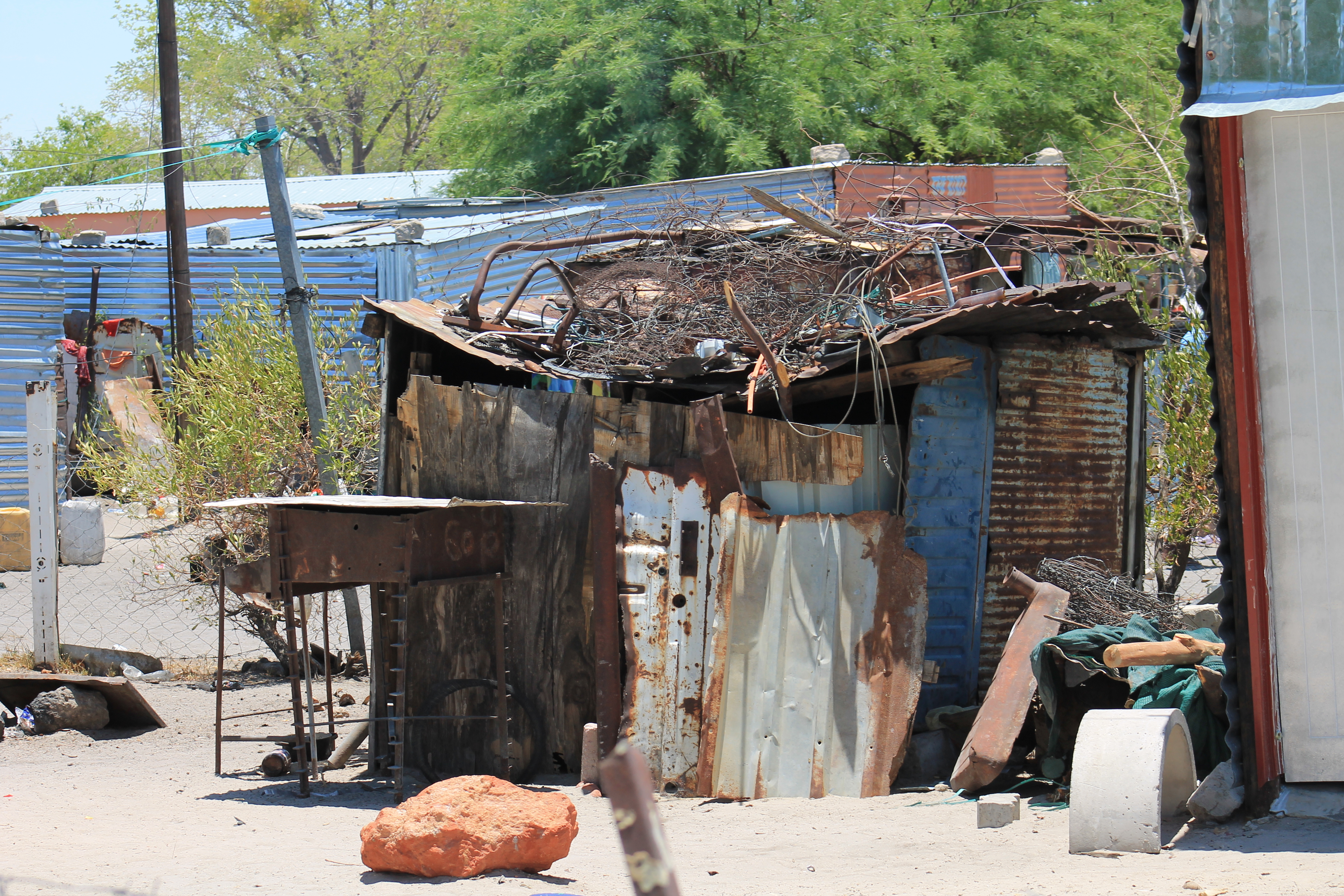
Oshakati, Namibia

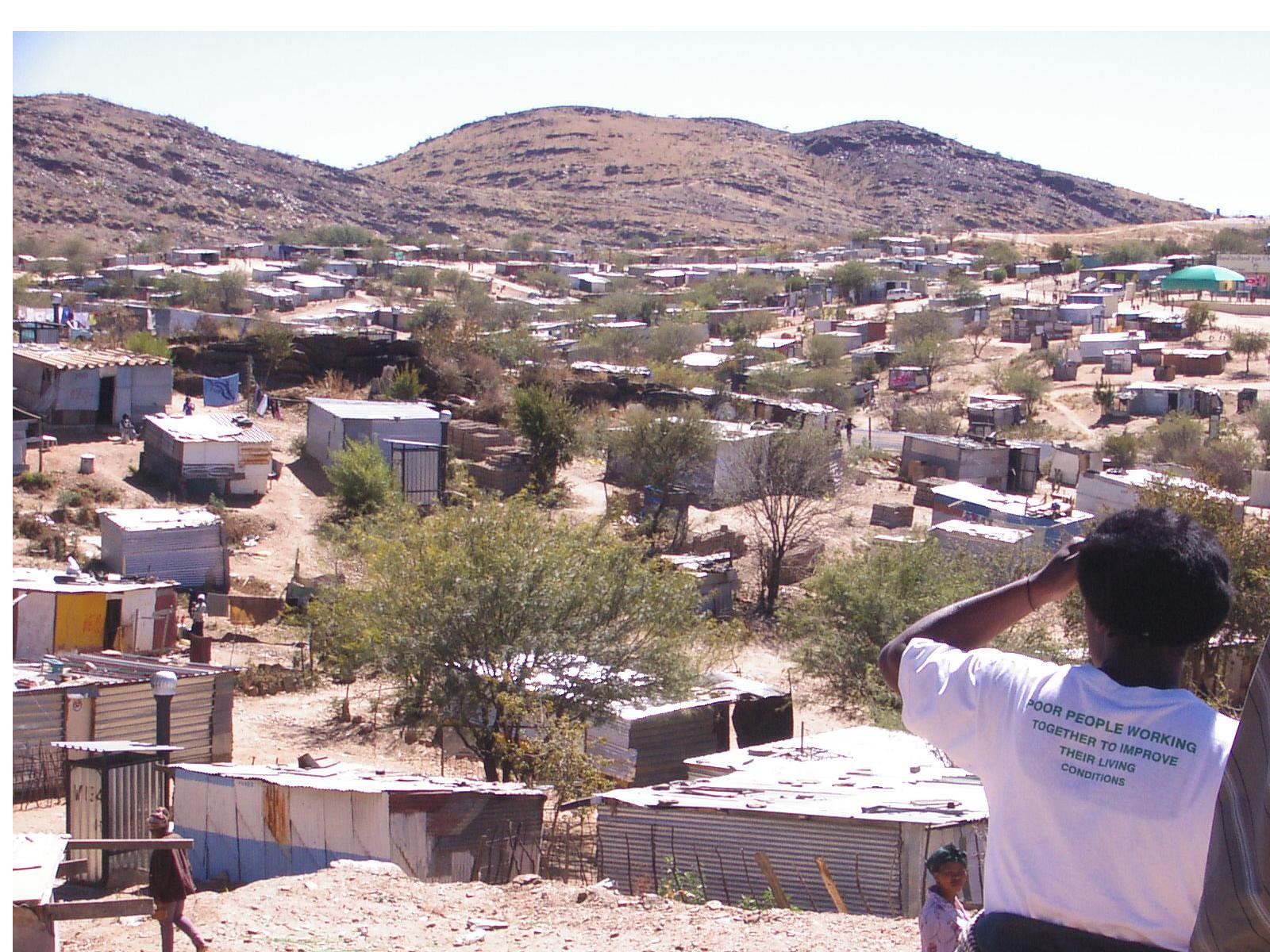
Windhoek, Namibia

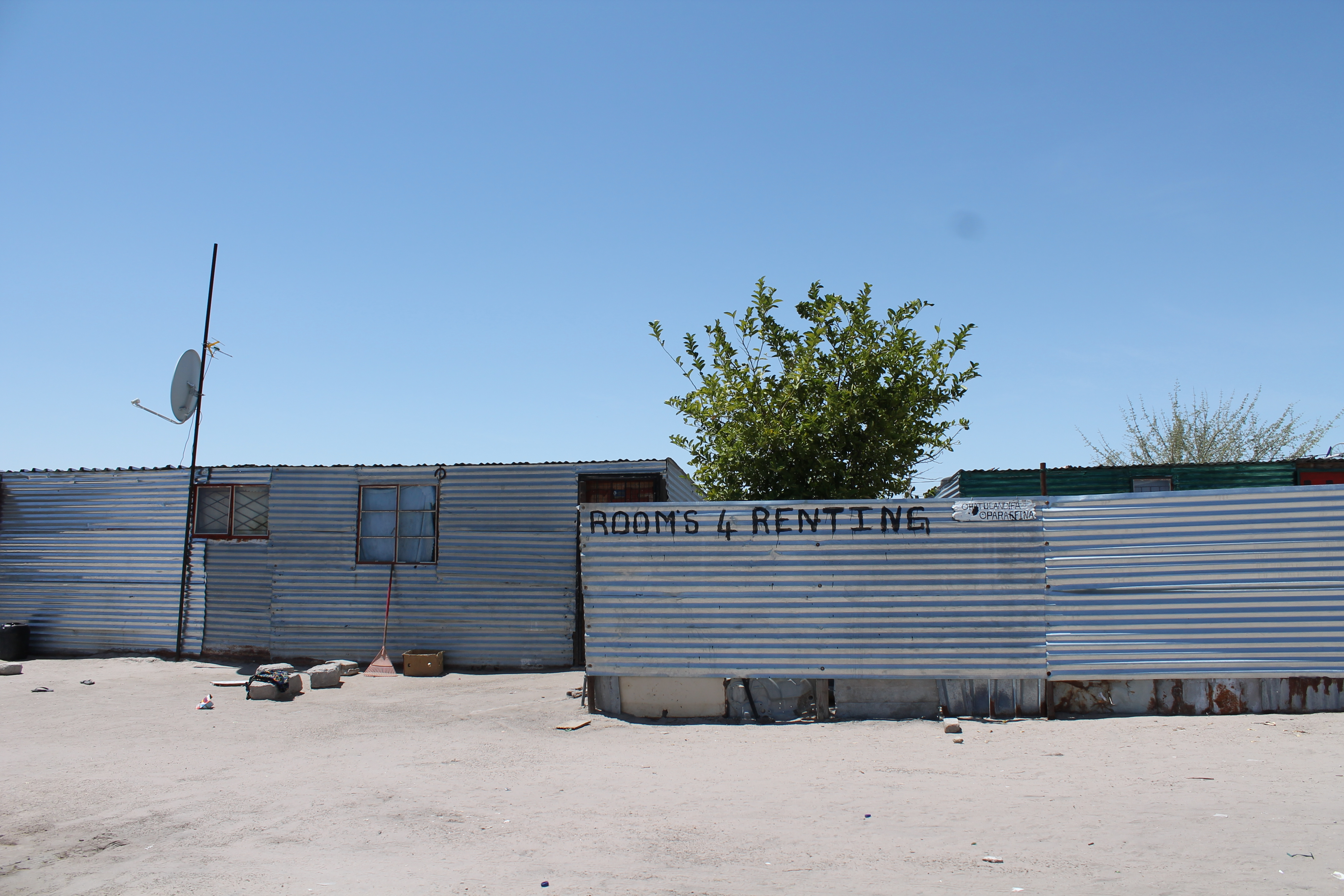
Oshakati, Namibia

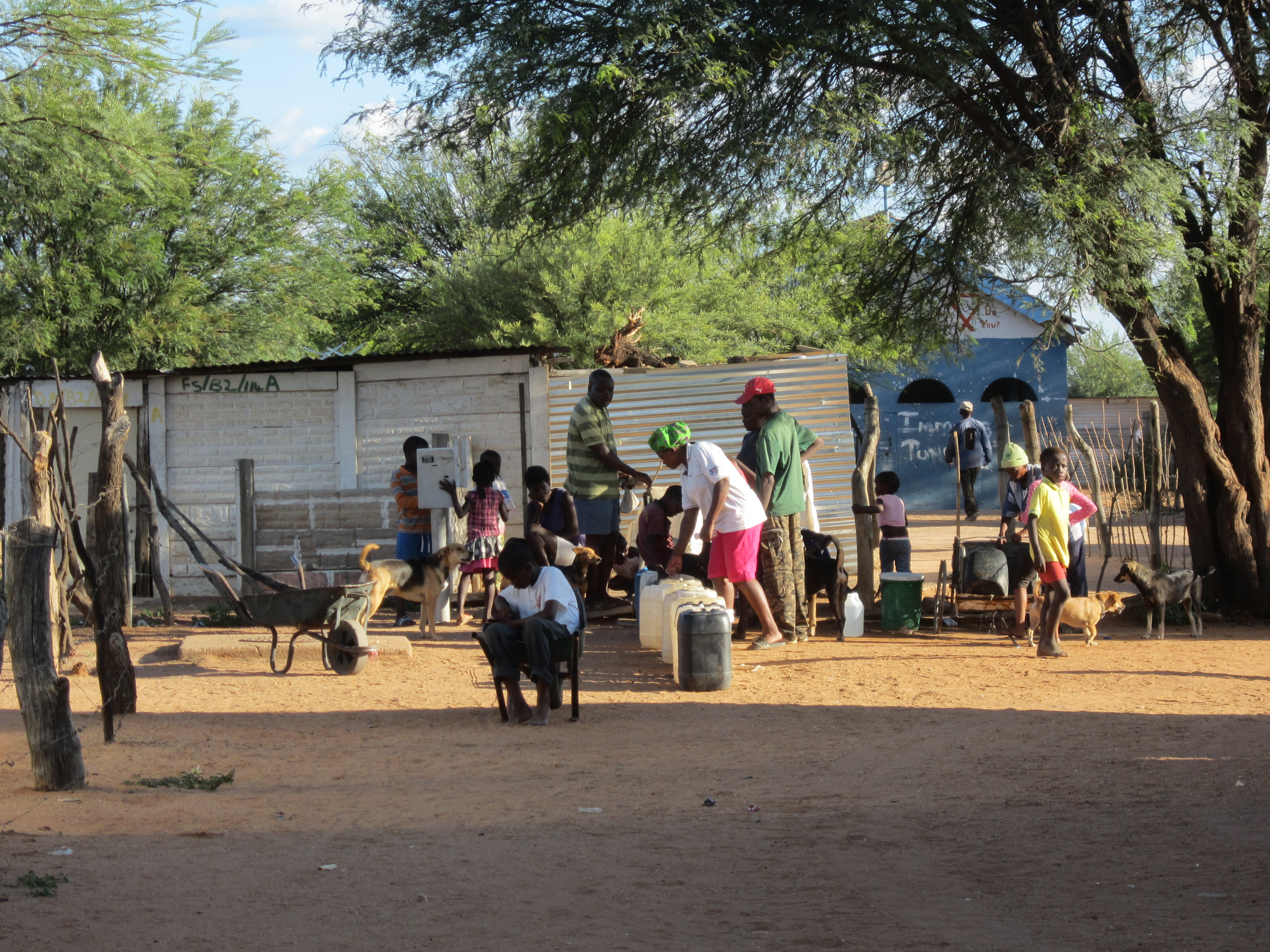
Gobabis, Namibia

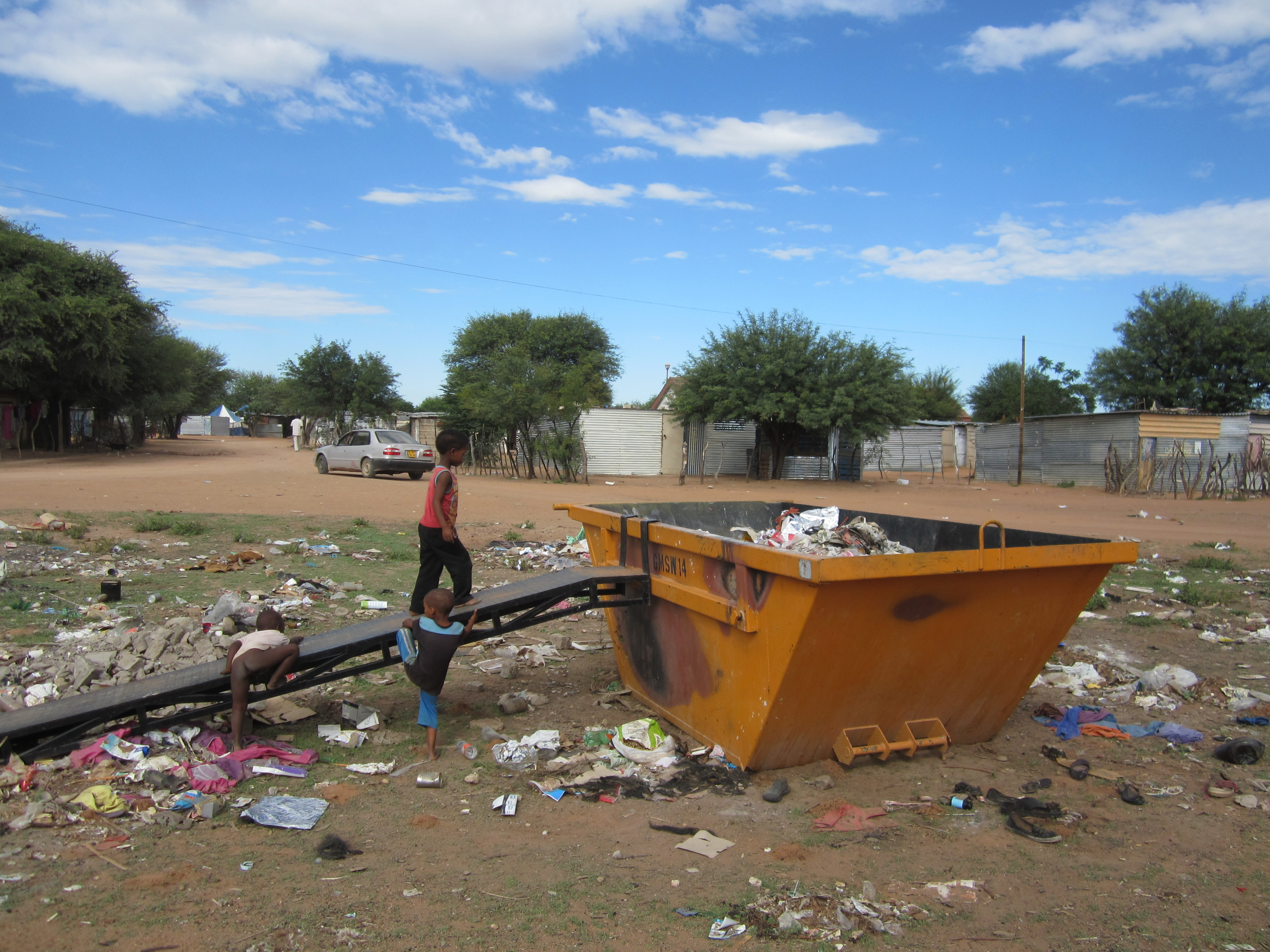
Gobabis, Namibia

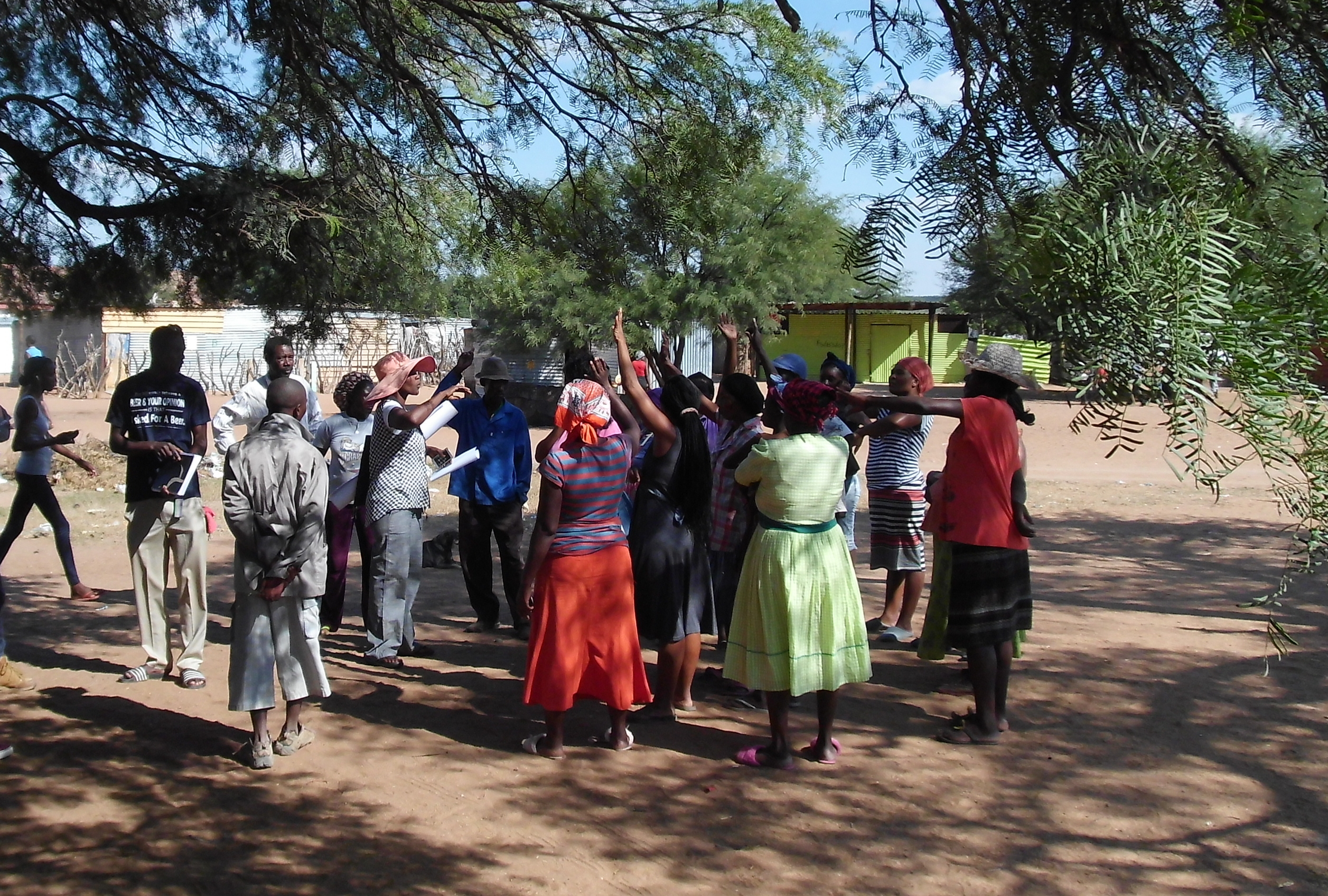
Gobabis, Namibia

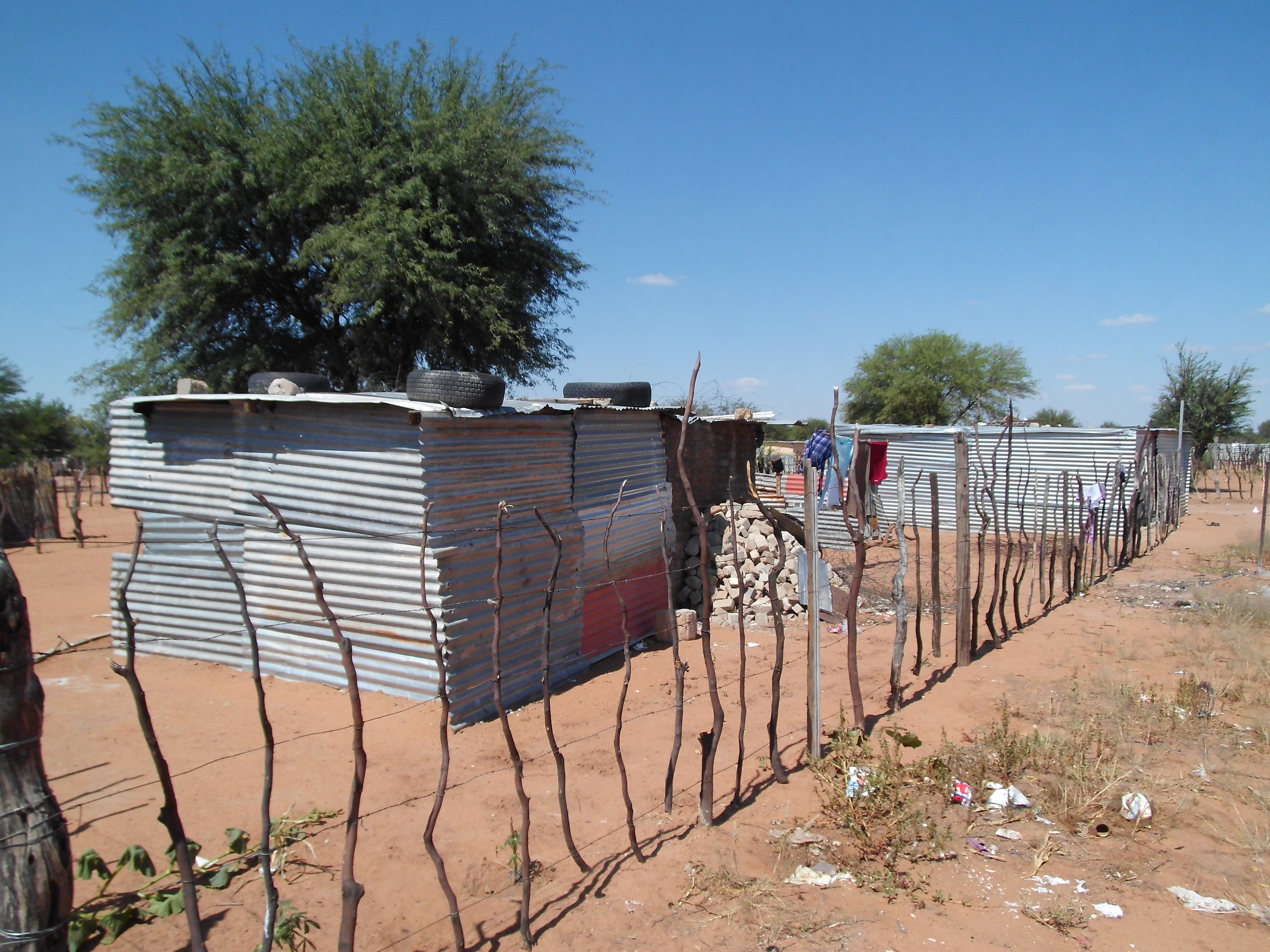
Gobabis, Namibia

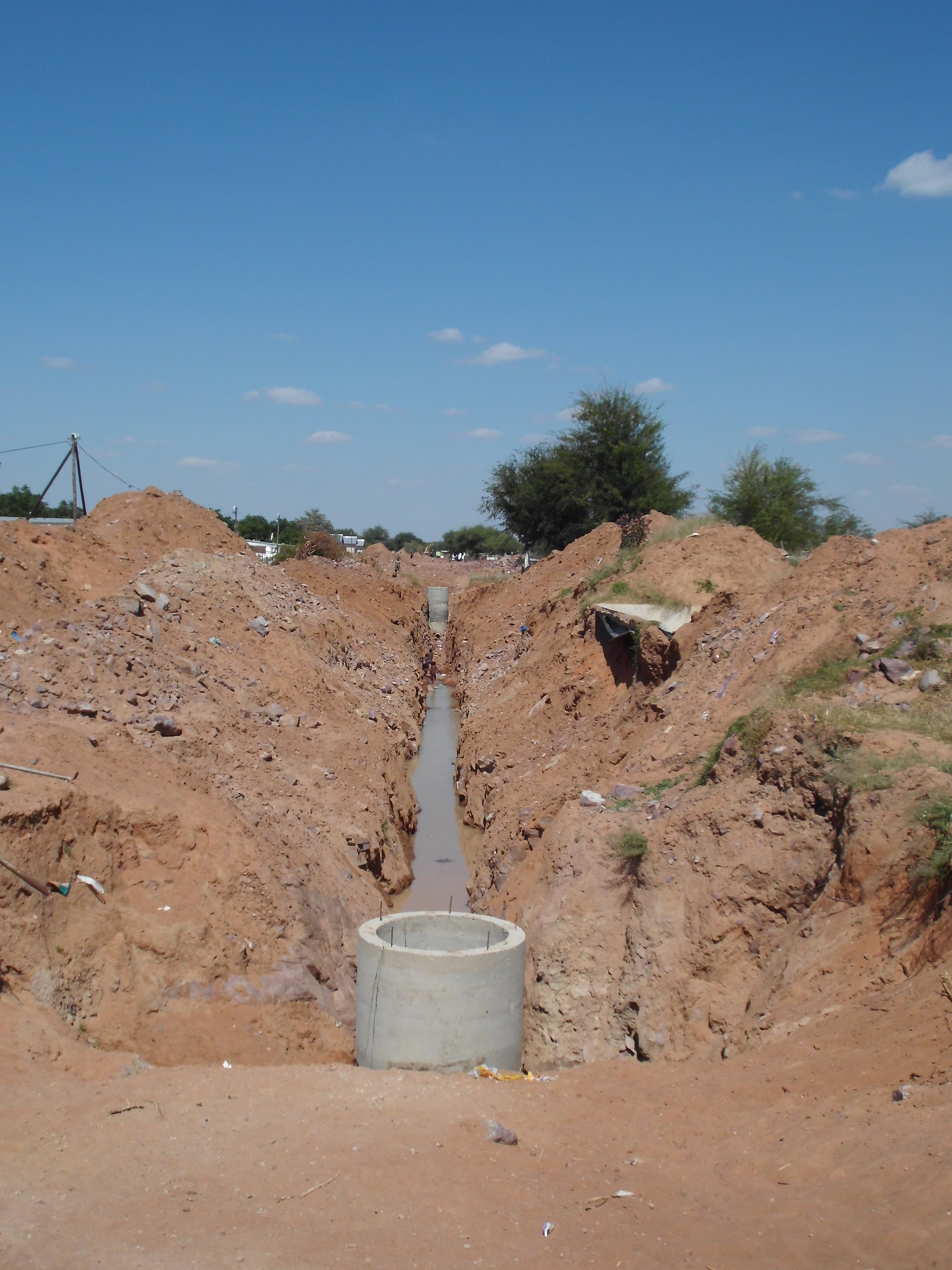
Gobabis, Namibia

The Flexible Land Tenure System (FLTS) is an innovative concept to provide affordable security of tenure to inhabitants in informal settlements in Namibia.

The basic idea of the Flexible Land Tenure System is to establish an interchangeable tenure registration system parallel and complementary to the current formal system of freehold tenure. The concept is derived from the need by the Government to create upgradable alternative land tenure options to informal settlements, which complements the current formal system of freehold tenure.

The system was formally introduced through the Flexible Land Tenure Act, 2012 (Act No. 4 of 2012) and tasks the Namibian Ministry of Land Reform with its implementation.

== Historical background ==
Urban policy of both the German and South African colonial administrations was to create town centres as exclusive white residential, recreational and business areas. Throughout the colonial era, both public and private investment was concentrated in these town centres. The black population was allowed to move in mainly as contract labourers who lived in separate areas (townships) with housing and other social services inferior to those of “white areas”. Permanent black urbanisation was discouraged, while a number of laws, such as pass laws and prohibition of urban land ownership, controlled most aspects of black residents’ lives. Black people (mostly men) were recruited mainly from communal areas in the north to work as contract labourers in factories and service industries in commercial areas south of the red line. The apartheid policy in South West Africa under South African rule did not allow for black urban migrants to bring their families to live with them in towns in commercial areas. Most men recruited from communal areas lived in single-quarter accommodation in the commercial areas. The development of informal settlements was also strictly regulated by apartheid policy.

At independence, apartheid policy was abolished and the new Constitution introduced the right of all Namibians to reside and settle in any part of the country. This provoked a dramatic increase of informal settlement in Windhoek and other urban areas.

== Urbanization in Namibia ==
Population density in Namibia by regions (census 2011)

Urban areas in Namibia are declared as city /municipality, town, village or settlement area, under the jurisdiction of the respective local authority. As of 2015, Namibia had 13 municipalities, 26 towns, 19 villages and more than 60 settlement areas. Due to the small population size (about two million people live on 825.000 km2), Namibia has not developed large urban centres. However, calculated on World Bank population estimates and urban ratios from the United Nations World Urbanization Prospects, Namibia's current urban population is about 46% with an urban growth rate of 4.6% per annum (growth rate of rural population: 0.6%). The major factor promoting the urbanization in the country is rural-to-urban migration, mainly by young people in search of better social and economic opportunities.

Rapid urbanization processes and socio-economic changes take place specifically along the major routes and in the northern communal areas, where the majority of Namibia's people live. The four north-central regions (Omusati, Oshana, Ohangwena and Oshikoto) alone occupy about 10% of the country's surface but host 40% of the population. The expanding road network that has roots in the historic trade and migratory routes opens up new areas for settlement.

Urban expansion in these areas triggers specific problems. Informal settlements around urban centres and traditional settlement patterns, combined with the annual floods during the wet season in the Oshana network (shallow water courses and ponds, which run through the flat alluvial floodplain of the regions) pose unique challenges to the extension of towns as well as to the provision of public services to the urban areas. This is further compounded by a conflict between urban and rural development resulting from traditional settlement administration alongside urban centres.

The rapid increase in the development of informal settlements around urban areas resulted in mostly unplanned development with a minimum of public services. Undeveloped land within a local authority's area belongs to the local authority. Local authorities develop land on cost recovery basis. Due to high development costs, local authorities are unable to develop sufficient and affordable plots for low income groups, which turn to informal settling as an alternative. In 2009, the number of informal settlements was counted and found to be 232 (with an estimated population of 595,000 inhabitants), in 2016 it was estimated to be almost 280. Thus, urban expansion, where strict zoning of towns is intended, has to address existing settlements that are administered according to the customary land tenure system. The affected households are either compensated or integrated into the urban centres.

== The Flexible Land Tenure System ==
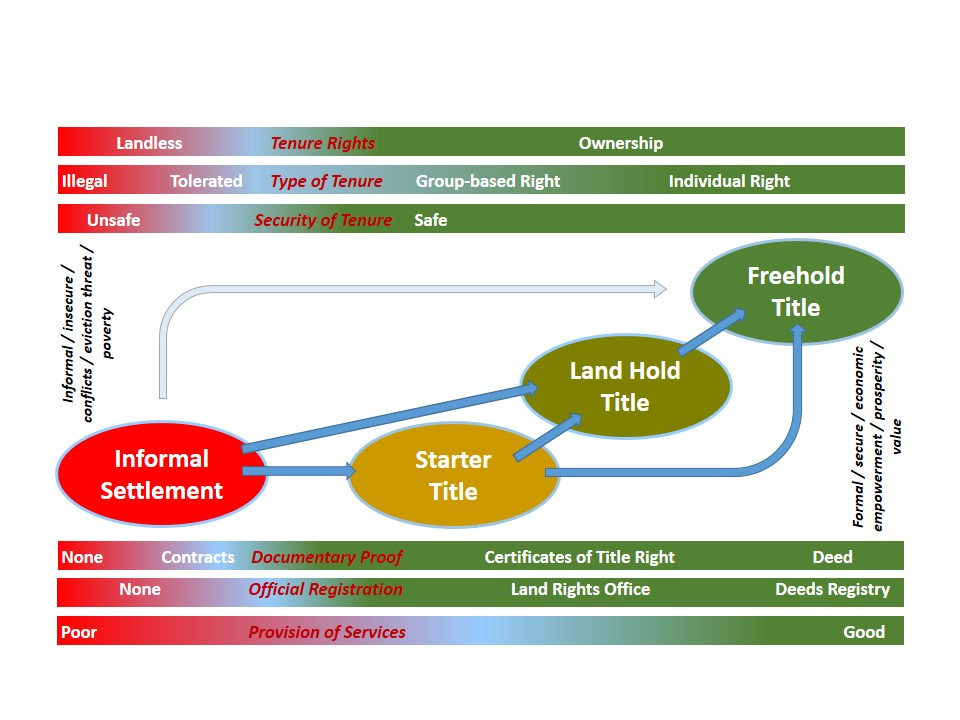
The evolution of tenureship under the Flexible Land Tenure System

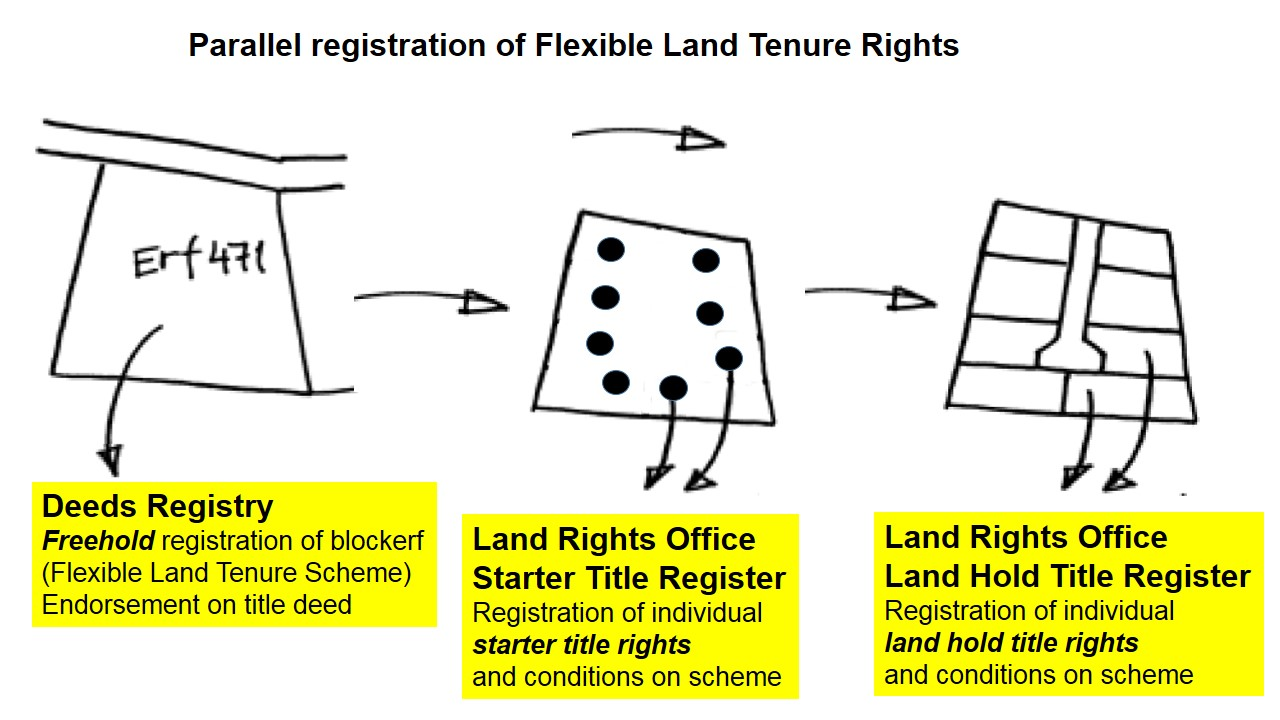
Parallel registration of Flexible Land Tenure Rights

A joint project of the Ministry of Lands, Resettlements and Rehabilitation (now: Ministry of Land Reform) and the Danish organization Ibis, the Lands Project, aimed to approach the urban challenge by searching for innovative solutions to provide affordable access to security of tenure for informal urban settlers shortly after independence. The outcome of the project was the Flexible Land Tenure System (FLTS), manifested in a comprehensive report on the FLTS in 1997. It was developed in close consultation with stakeholders and included three pilot studies and three pilot projects. Since 1997 some amendments have been made, but the basics of the concept remain and were translated into the Flexible Land Tenure Bill (2004) which was then enacted in 2012.

The basic idea of the FLTS concept is to establish a flexible, interchangeable system parallel and complementary to the current formal system of freehold tenure. These attributes can be explained as follows:

- flexible - in the sense that it is at the discretion of the local authorities to choose the appropriate type of tenure for the formalisation of an informal settlement.
- interchangeable - in the sense that the different tenure types catered for in the parallel registries can be upgraded, and
- parallel - parallel to the existing freehold registration system in the sense that parallel institutions will be responsible for the registration of different tenure types.

Two new types of tenures will be introduced within the system and additional to the existing freehold tenure, namely the starter title and the land hold title. Both titles are individual types of tenure but group based, in that the outside boundary of a block earmarked for titling under the FLTS (blockerf) is professionally surveyed and registered under the freehold tenure system at the Deeds Registry while individual tenure rights are subsequently registered in the newly established Land Rights Offices. Ownership of the block can be with the local authority, a private owner or a community-based organisation (CBO).

=== Blockerf ===
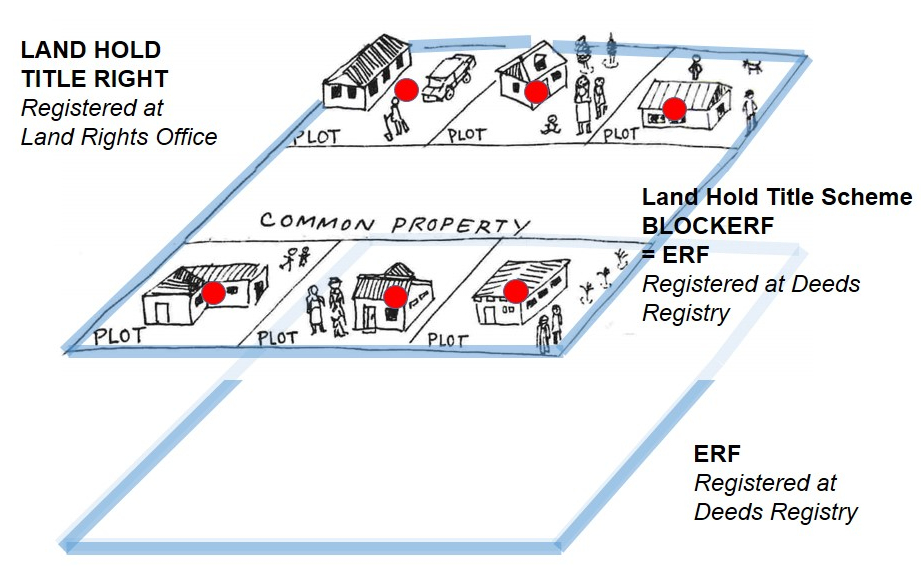
Flexible Land Tenure System - Land Hold Title Rights on a blockerf

The blockerf (pl. blockerven) is defined as a piece of land on which a starter title scheme or a land hold title scheme is established. The term is derived from erf (pl. erven), the legal expression (Afrikaans) defined in Namibia's Deeds Registries Act to describe "a piece of land registered in a deeds registry as an erf, lot, plot or stand".

Before the establishment of a starter title scheme or a land hold title scheme is finally considered, the land concerned must be subdivided or consolidated by means of cadastral survey in such a manner that the flexible land tenure scheme concerned would be situated on one portion of land (blockerf) registered as such in the deeds registry and any mortgage, usufruct, fideicommissum or similar right on that piece of land must be cancelled. Any survey of blockerven has to be carried out by professional land surveyors.

=== Land Rights Offices ===
The Land Rights Office (LRO) registers the starter and land hold titles in separate registers. There may be only a single national Land Rights Office, or there may be several regional Land Rights Offices. The Land Rights Office is established by the Minister of Land Reform and the area served must be announced in a notice in the Government Gazette, and likewise any changes to Land Rights Offices.

Every Land Rights Office is managed by a Land Rights Registrar appointed by the Minister of Land Reform. The Registrar may be assisted by registration officers and land measurers who are also appointed by the Minister of Land Reform. These persons are all employees in the public service. They need to ensure that all necessary information is recorded in the starter and land hold title registers. They also help set up new schemes and inspect existing ones to make sure that the information recorded is correct. They also help if people want to transfer their titles to someone else. A Land Rights Office may charge fees for its services. These fees must be set by the Minister of Land Reform in Regulations published in the Government Gazette.

According to section 6 of the Flexible Land Tenure Act, the Registrar of Deeds who is responsible for the national system of deeds registration is the supervisory authority of the Land Rights Offices. The Registrar of Deeds is entitled to issue directives and perform inspections or cause such inspections as deemed necessary. The Registrar of Deeds must also establish the starter title and land hold title registers.

=== Two types of tenure ===
==== Starter Title Right ====
The starter title right is the more simple level of tenure security. It provides the holder with the right to occupy an undefined site within a blockerf in perpetuity and to erect a dwelling at this location. In consent with the community, sites may be identified by the relevant authority informally without proper surveying. Therefore, the starter title right cannot be mortgaged and cannot be subject to a right of way or servitudes.

The holder of a starter title right is allowed to transfer, to bequeath or to lease the right. However these rights may be subject to restrictions by the group’s constitution or conditions imposed by the local authority. Except for persons who are married in community of property, a starter title right may not be held by more than one person jointly and no juristic person may hold any starter title right. The persons who are entitled to be registered as the initial holders of rights in a starter title scheme are the heads of the households. No person may hold more than one starter title right and no person may acquire a starter title right if he or she is the owner of any immovable property or a land hold title right in Namibia. There is no restriction on tenure by foreigners.

==== Land Hold Title Right ====
The land hold title right provides the owner with the right to occupy a defined and demarcated site (plot) within a blockerf in perpetuity. The holder of a land hold title right has all the rights to the plot concerned that an owner has in respect of his or her erf under the common law and may perform all the juristic acts in respect of the plot concerned that an owner may perform in respect of his or her erf under Namibia’s common law (freehold). The holder has also an undivided share in the common property which is those parts of the blockerf concerned that do not form part of any plot.

Land hold title right holders are allowed to transfer, to bequeath or to lease the right. However these rights may be subject to restrictions by the group’s constitution or conditions imposed by the local authority. The land hold title right may also be used as a collateral for a mortgage or any other form of security for a debt. It can also be subject to a right of way or servitudes relating to the provision of public services.

The plots will be surveyed and demarcated on the ground by a land measurer of the Land Rights Office who has to establish a land hold plan to be filed as record in the respective Land Rights Office.

Unlike the starter title right, there is no restrictions on tenureship.

=== The Process of Establishment of Schemes ===
Before titles can be granted the desirability and suitability of the informal settlement has to be determined. Therefore, the local authority must conduct a feasibility study of the area earmarked for formalisation under the flexible land tenure system. A professional land surveyor needs to survey the outer boundaries of the blockerf and subdivide it from the surroundings for registration as an individual freehold title deed.

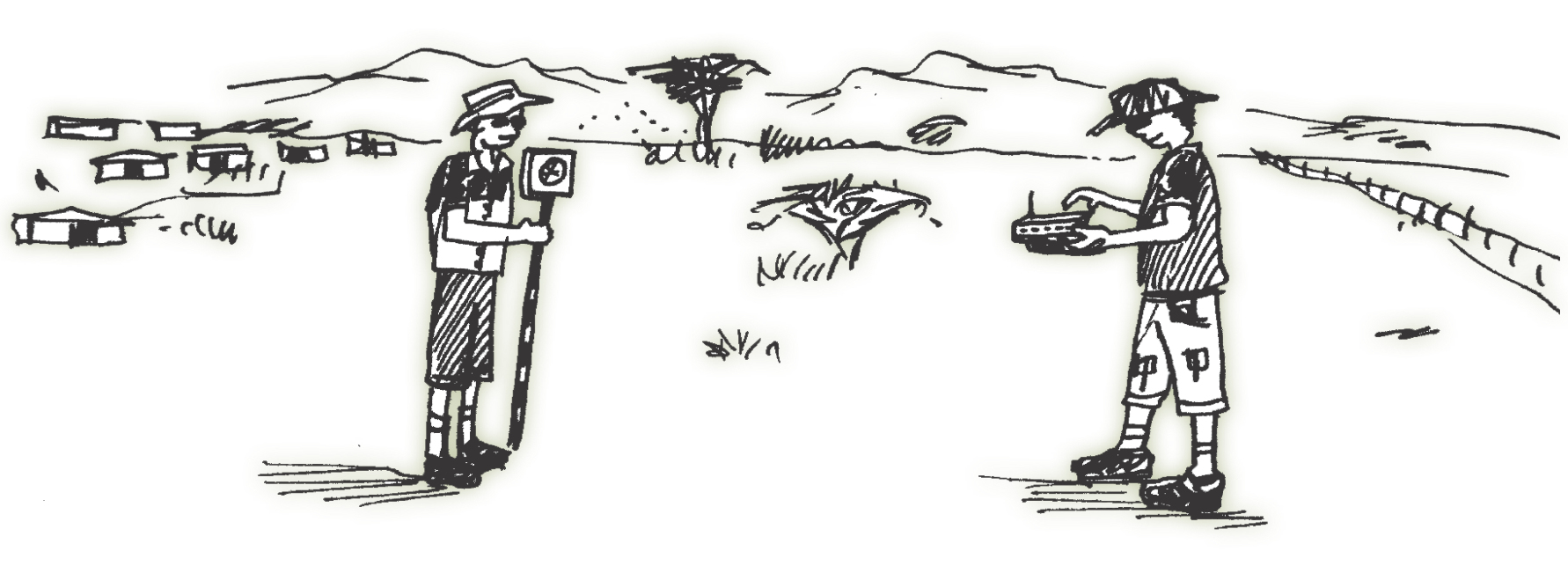
The Flexible Land Tenure Land Measurer

No inner subdivision is required for starter title schemes. In the case of a land hold title scheme a layout plan has to be established and the setting out incl. demarcation must be carried out by the land measurer.

Following these preliminary steps for establishment of starter title or land hold title scheme and if the relevant authority is satisfied that the establishment of the title scheme is desirable and has approved it, a flexible land tenure scheme is deemed to be established after the Registrar of Deeds has made an endorsement on the title deed of the blockerf concerned. The individual titles will then be registered at the Land Rights Office.

=== Associations ===
Every starter title or land hold title scheme must have an association consisting only of the holders of title rights in the scheme. In order for these associations to function correctly membership is mandatory.

According to the Flexible Land Tenure Act, the functions of the associations are

- to represent the holders of rights in the scheme concerned in negotiations with the relevant authority;
- to manage the common property of the scheme concerned (land hold title schemes only);
- to mediate disputes between members of the scheme concerned (starter title schemes only).

Each association will be governed by a constitution and managed by a committee.

=== Upgrading of Title Rights ===
The starter title right is upgradeable to the land hold title right. Upgrading of starter title rights is only possible if at least 75% of the holders of rights in a starter title scheme have consented to the upgrade. The layout planning has to be finalised and approved in order for individual plots to be defined and allocated under the land hold title.

Starter title schemes and land hold title schemes can be upgraded to freehold title if at least 75% of the holders of rights in a scheme have consented. In the case of upgrading to freehold the title holders will have to pay for the subdivision of his/her plot and the subsequent registration in the Deeds Registry.

== Pilot Areas ==
In 2016, the Ministry of Land Reform decided to pilot the new tenure registration system in different pilot areas, namely in Gobabis, Oshakati, Outapi and Windhoek.

== See also ==
- Informal settlement
- Land Reform
- Land registration
- Shanty town
- Slum
- Title (property)
- Urbanization
