= Field (agriculture) =

Area of land used for agricultural purposes

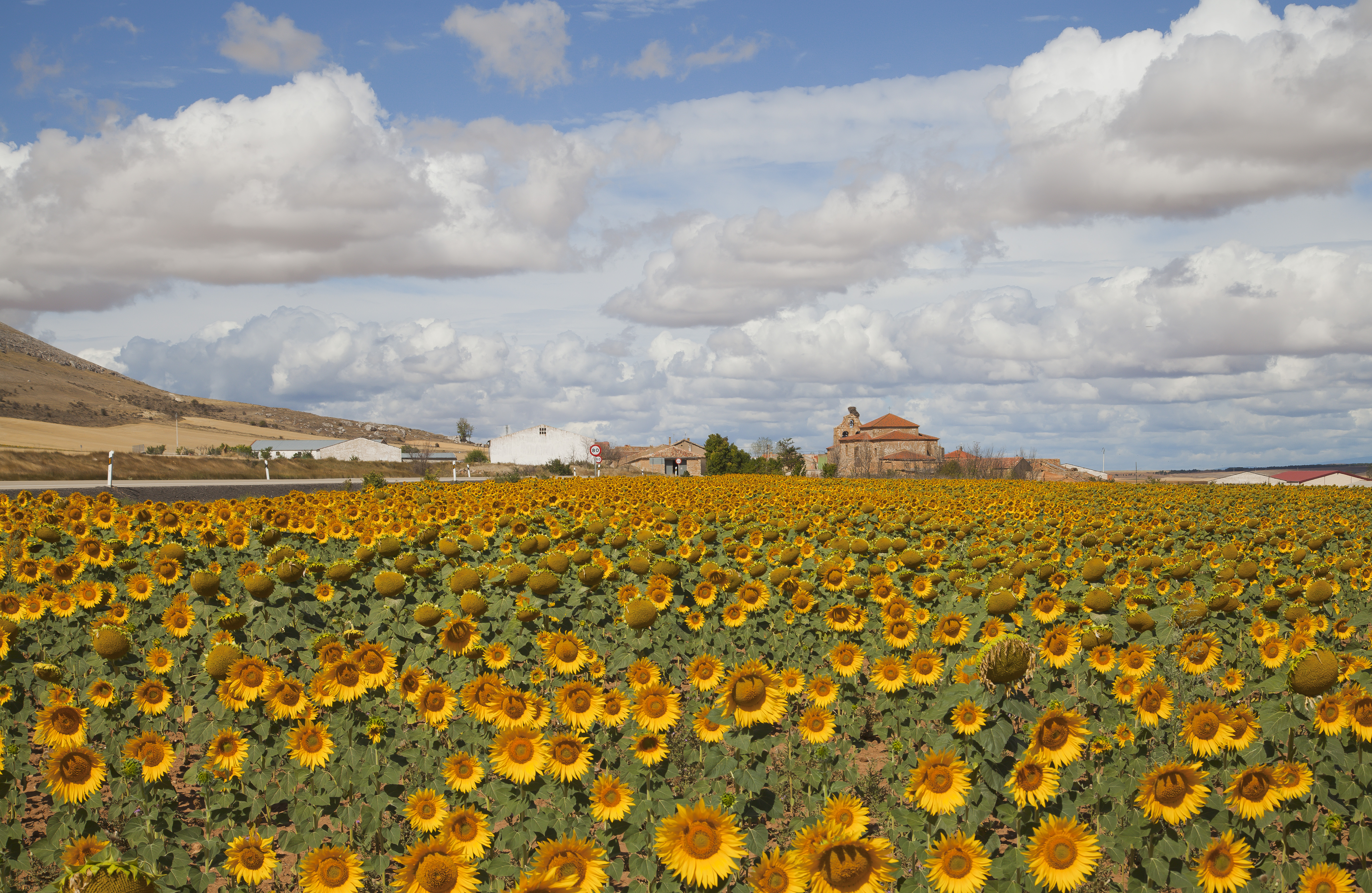
A field of sunflowers in Cardejón, Spain (2012)

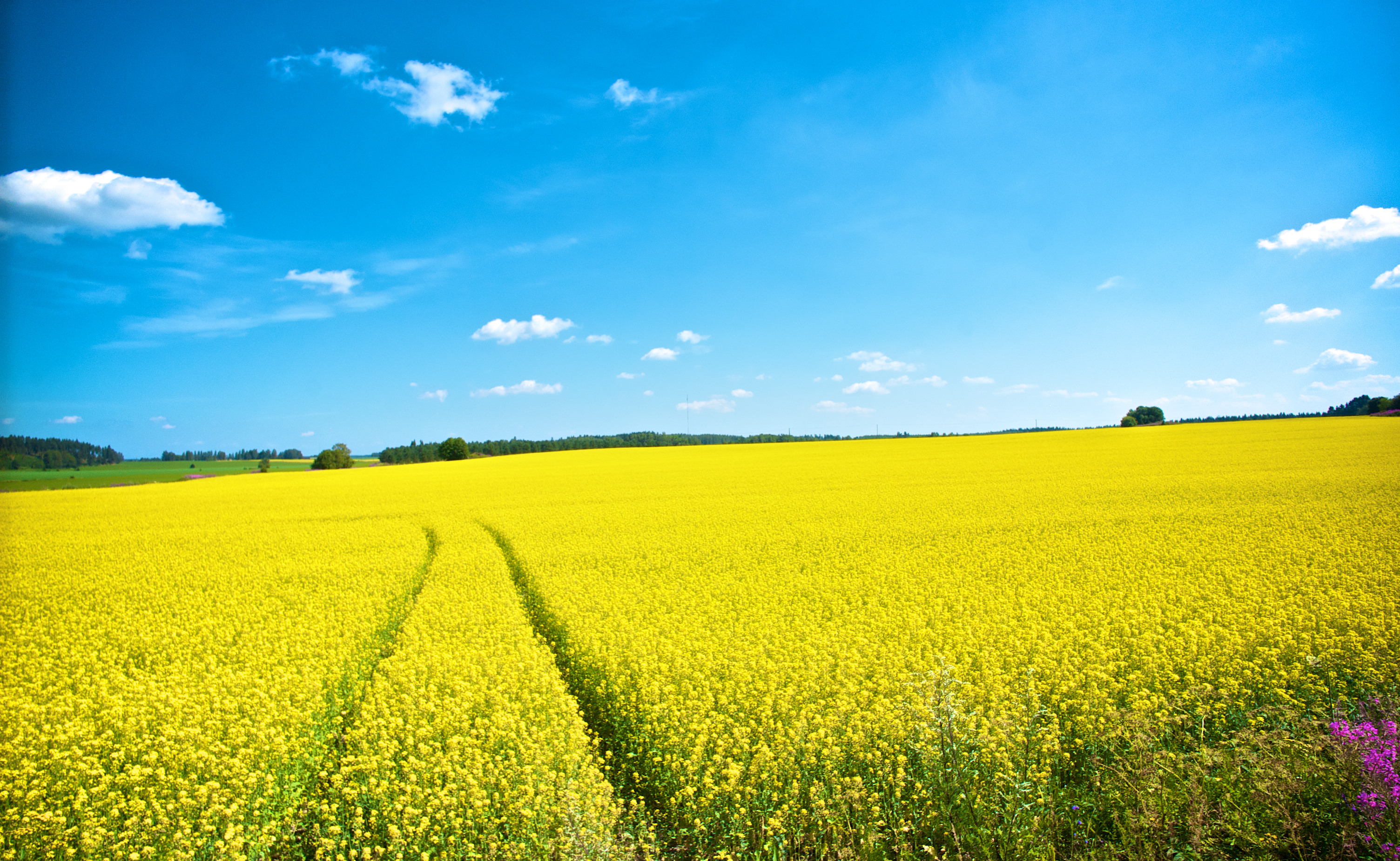
A field of rapeseeds in Kärkölä, Finland (2010)

In agriculture, a field is an area of land, enclosed or otherwise, used for agricultural purposes such as cultivating crops or as a paddock or enclosure for livestock. A field may also be an area left to lie fallow or as arable land.

Many farms have a field border, usually composed of a strip of shrubs and vegetation, used to provide food and cover necessary for the survival of wildlife. It has been found that these borders may lead to an increased variety of animals and plants in the area, but also in some cases a decreased yield of crops.

== Paddock ==
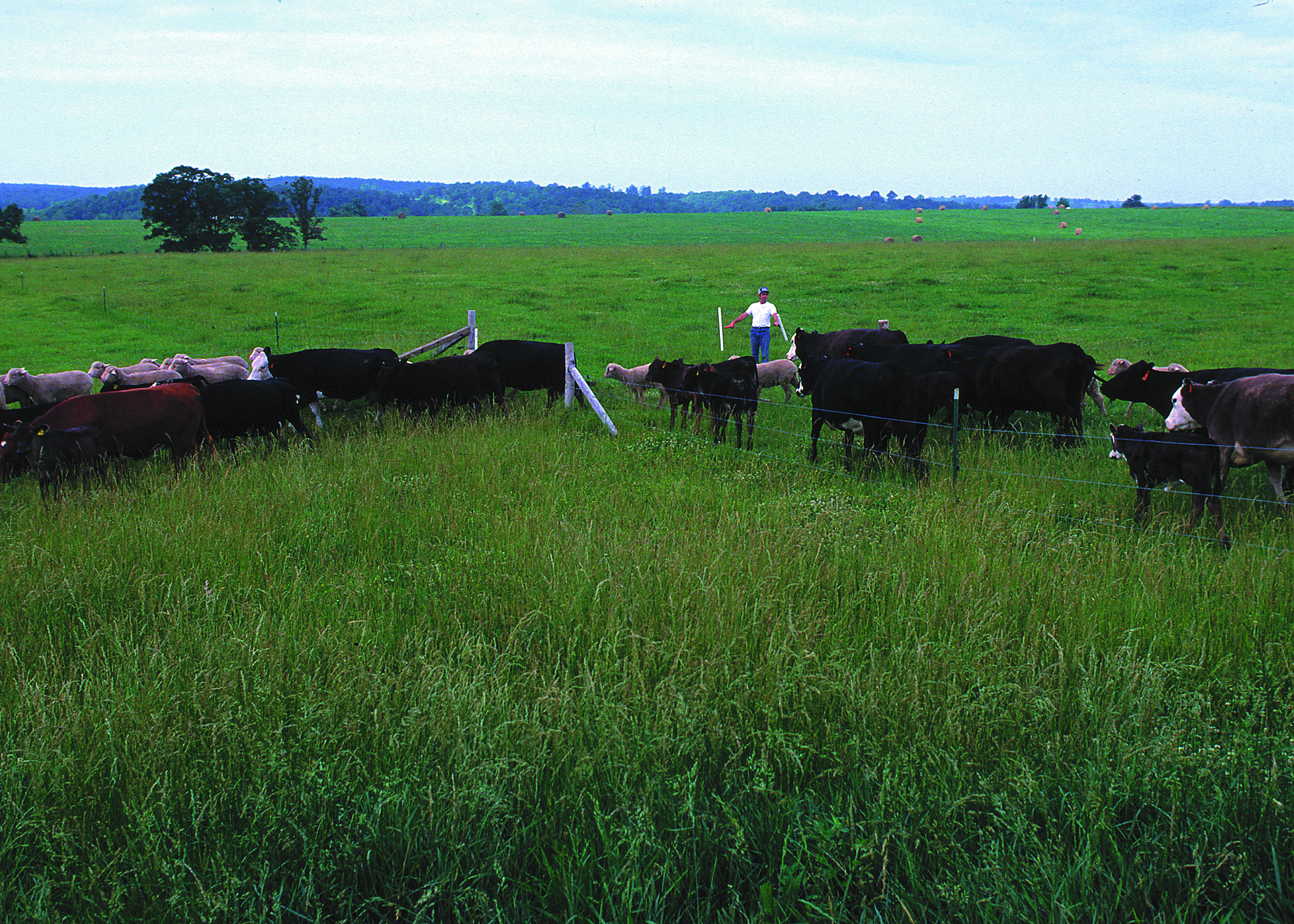
Rotational grazing with pasture divided into paddocks, each grazed in turn for a short period

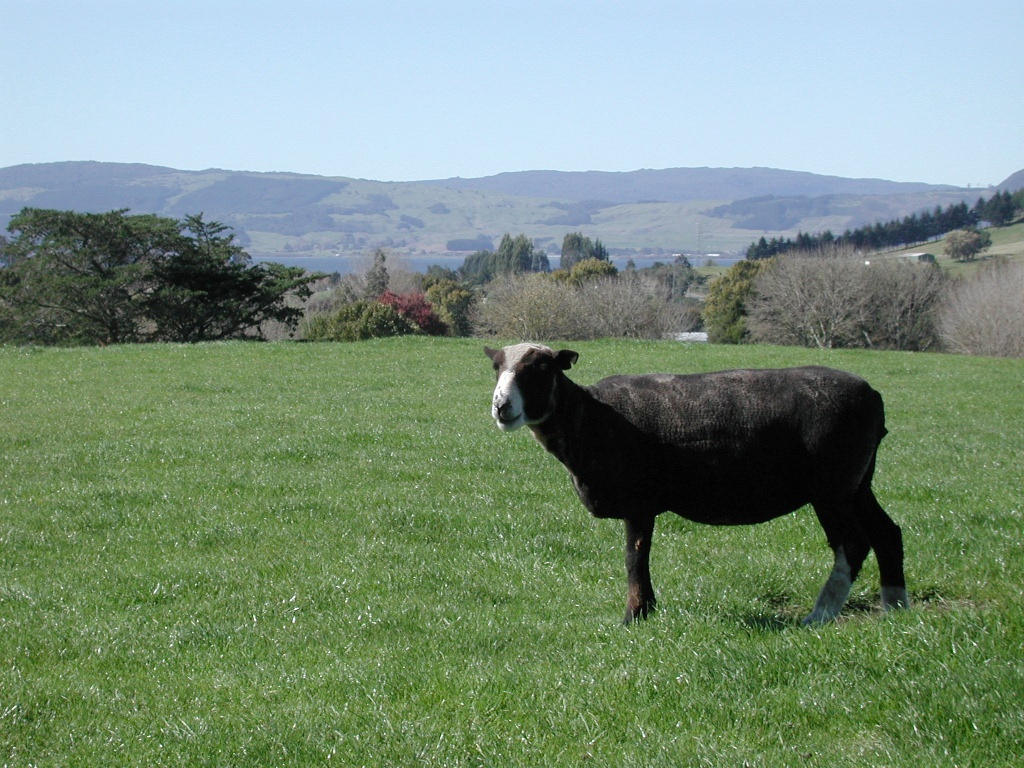
A Black sheep on a New Zealand paddock with Lake Rotorua in the background

In Australian and New Zealand English, any agricultural field may be called a paddock, especially if for keeping sheep or cattle. If stock are grazed there, the space may be called a run, e.g. sheep run; cattle run. The term paddock is used more specifically in animal husbandry for a system in which grazing land is divided into small areas, paddocks, and the stock graze each paddock in turn for a short period. Paddock grazing systems may be designed with, for example, 6 or 11 paddocks used in rotation.

A paddock is normally fenced, usually by wire, and often defined by its natural boundaries, or is otherwise considered distinct. A back paddock is a smaller field that is situated away from the farm house; possibly land of lesser quality. The equivalent concept in North America and the UK is a pasture.

In Australia, the word seems to have had its current meaning since at least 1807 and in New Zealand since at least 1842. However, the English meaning of "field" was used earlier in Australia and is still occasionally used. Similarly, meadow was in early use and has appeared later, for example, in 2004. Field remains in regular use in Australasia in expressions such as football field, Field Day and field trip.

In a new style of intensive farming developed in North America, a paddock is a small (perhaps 1 acre) temporary subdivision of a pasture made with electric fencing, which is intensely grazed for a day and then left to rest for perhaps 80 days or more.

== Gallery ==
A newly plowed field in Ystad in 2026.

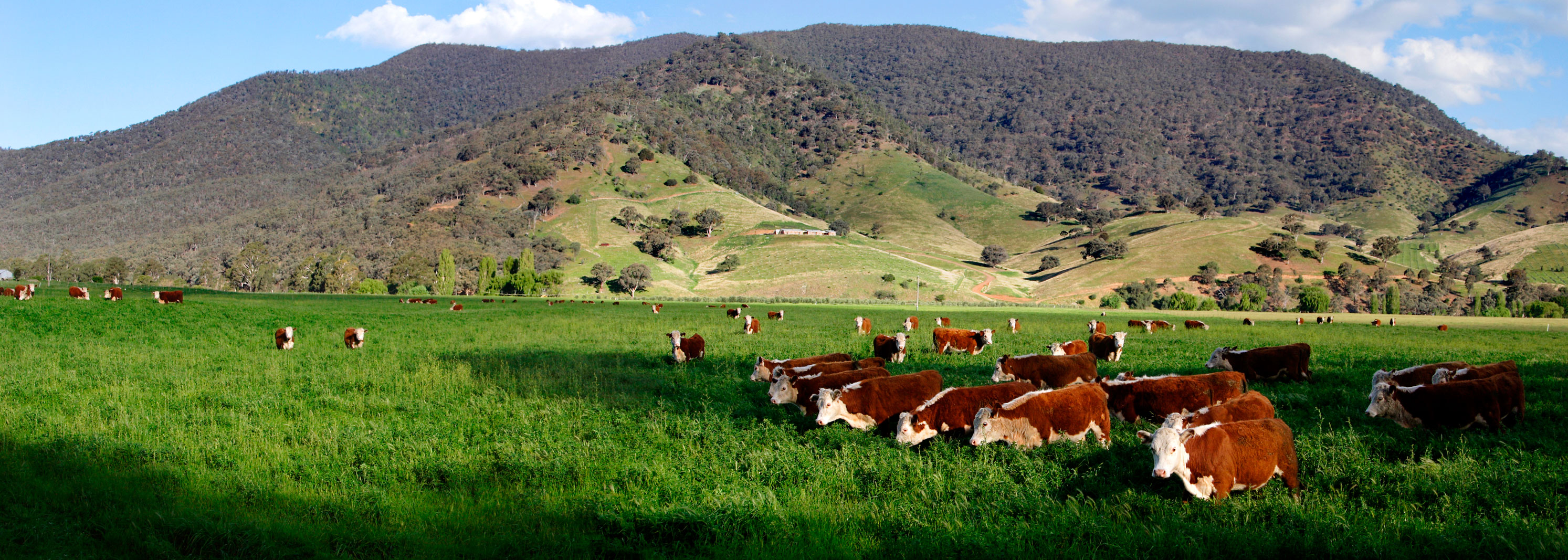
A green field or paddock with Hereford cattle

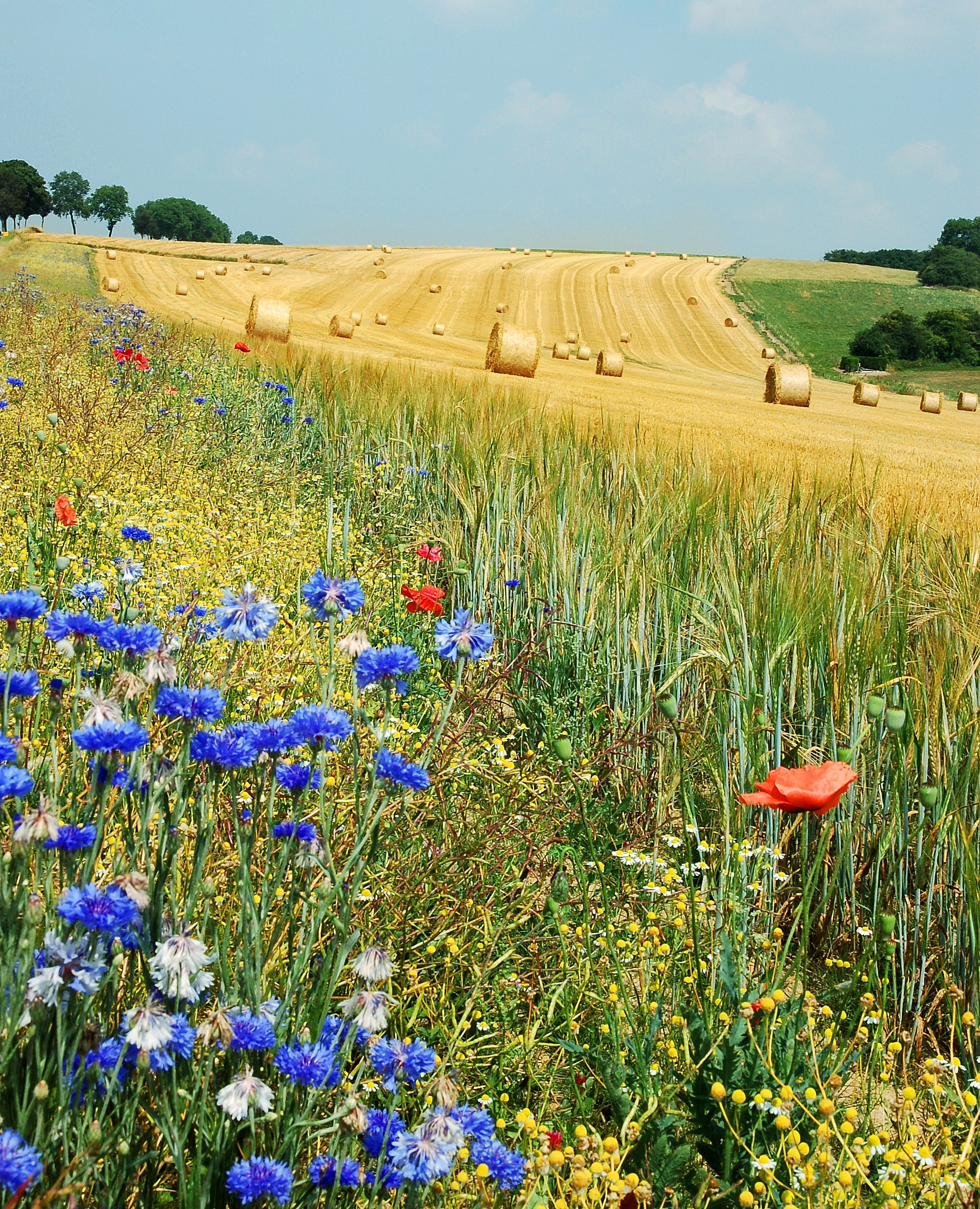
A summer field

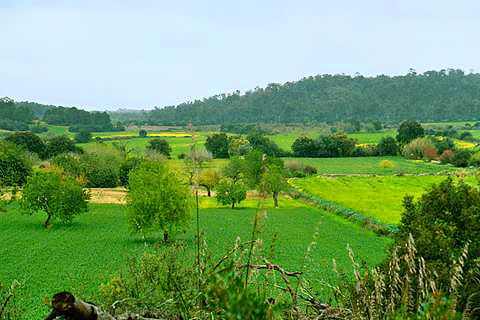
Spring fields with trees, Mallorca, Spain, 2004

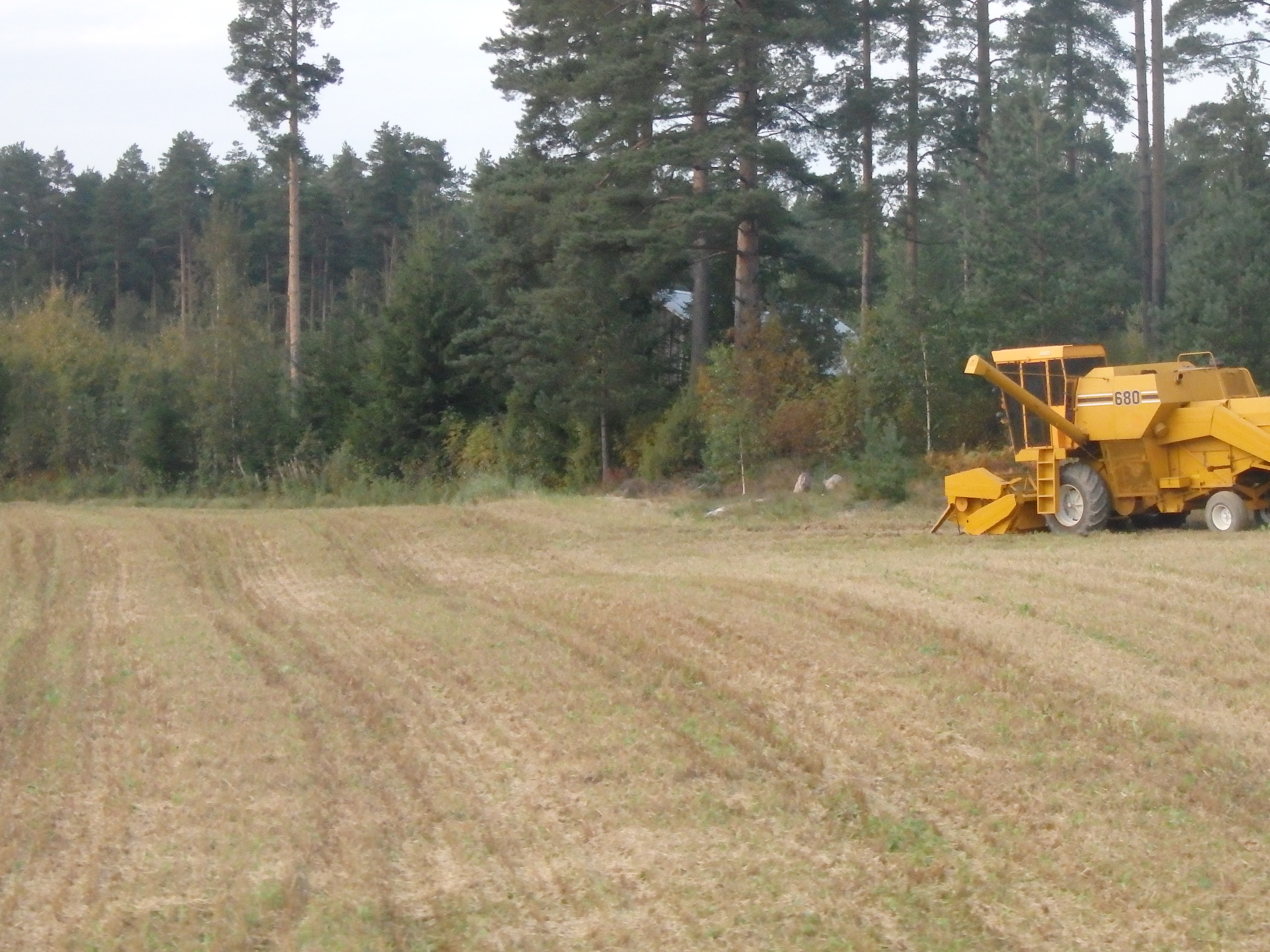
A combine harvester on the field, Pornainen, Finland, 2016

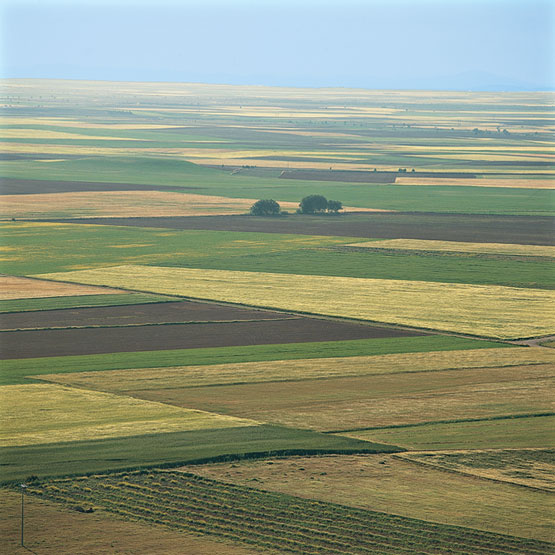
Sown fields in an open field system of farming

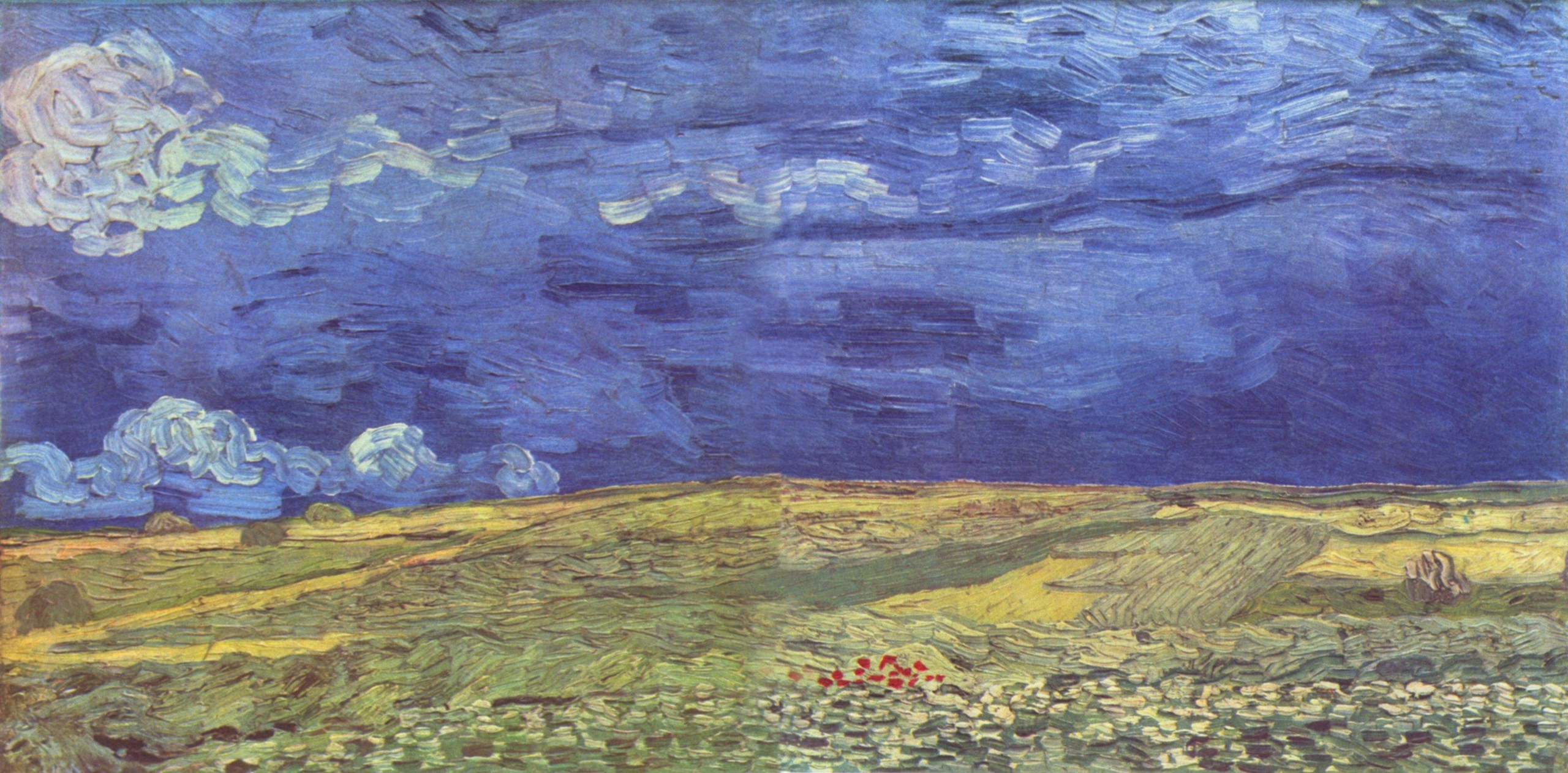
Wheat Field Under Clouded Sky by Vincent van Gogh, July 1890

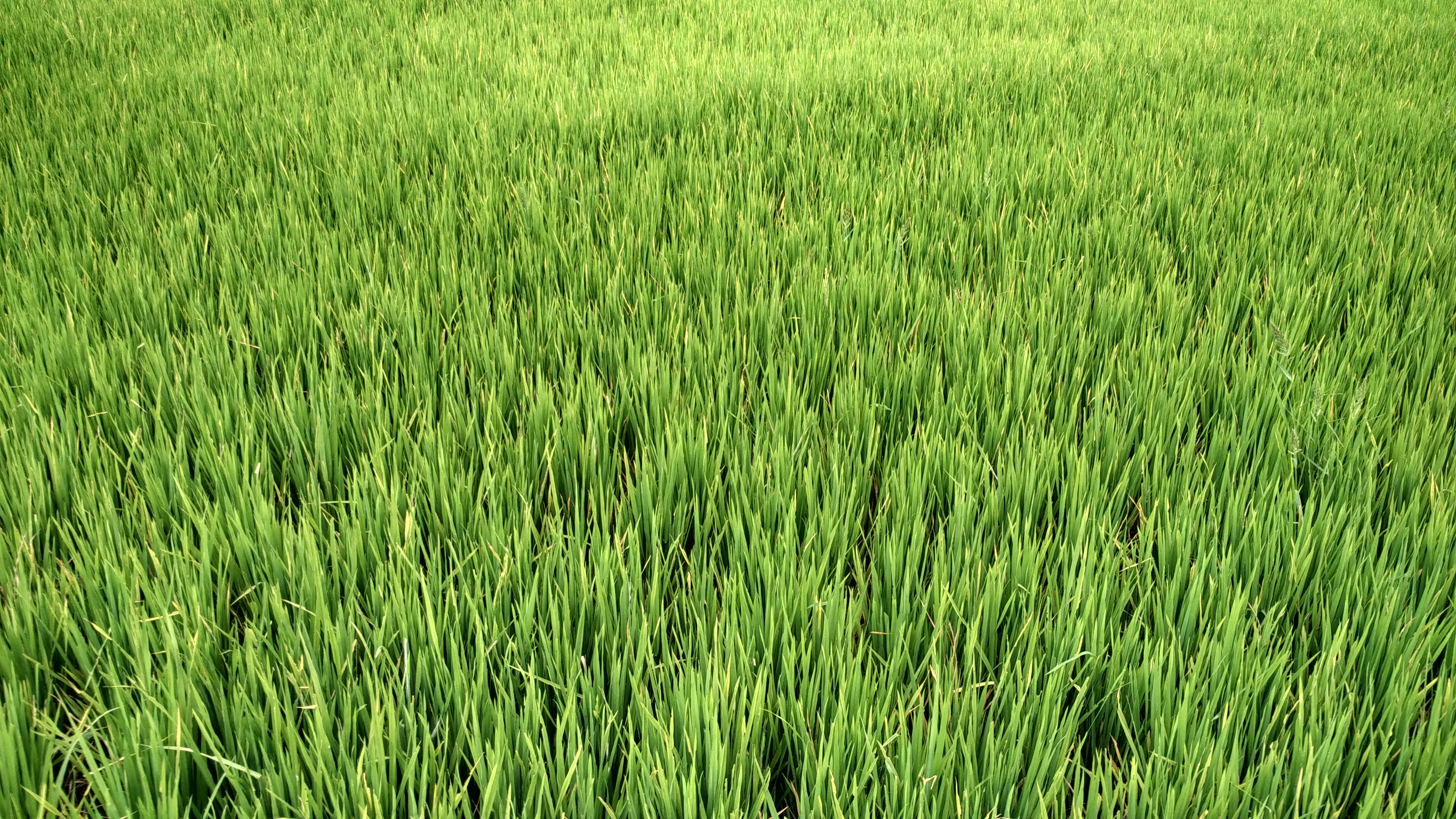
Paddy field

== See also ==
- Acre
- Coastal plain
- Flooded grasslands and savannas
- Flood-meadow
- Grassland
- Hectare
- Meadow
- Morgen
- Paddy field
- Pasture
- Plain
- Plateau
- Prairie
- Savanna
- Steppe
- Veld
- Vineyard
- Water-meadow
- Wet meadow
