= Arable land =

Land capable of being ploughed and used to grow crops

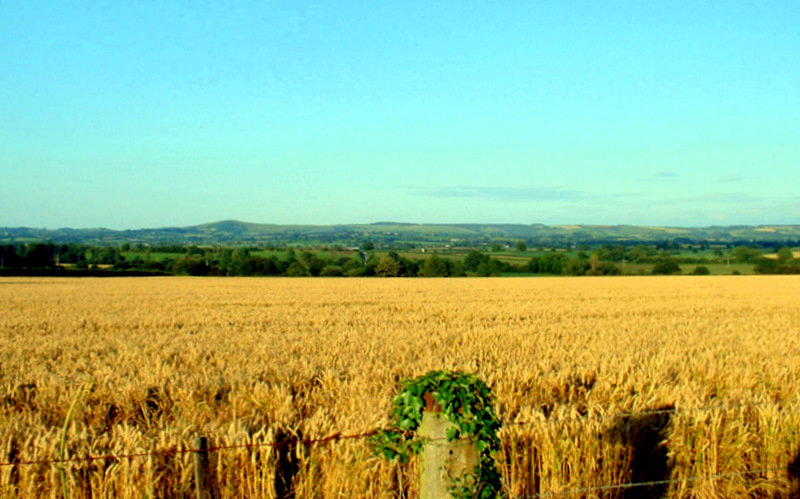
Modern mechanised agriculture permits large fields like this one in Dorset, England

Arable land (from Latin arābilis 'able to be ploughed or farmed') is any land capable of being ploughed and used to grow crops. Alternatively, for the purposes of agricultural statistics, the term often has a more precise definition:

Arable land is the land under temporary agricultural crops (multiple-cropped areas are counted only once), temporary meadows for mowing or pasture, land under market and kitchen gardens and land temporarily fallow (less than five years). The abandoned land resulting from shifting cultivation is not included in this category. Data for 'Arable land' are not meant to indicate the amount of land that is potentially cultivable.

A more concise definition appearing in the Eurostat glossary similarly refers to actual rather than potential uses: "land worked (ploughed or tilled) regularly, generally under a system of crop rotation". In Britain, arable land has traditionally been contrasted with pasturable land such as heaths, which could be used for sheep-rearing but not as farmland.

Arable land is vulnerable to land degradation and some types of un-arable land can be enriched to create useful land. Climate change and biodiversity loss are driving pressure on arable land.

== By country ==
According to the Food and Agriculture Organization of the United Nations, in 2013, the world's arable land amounted to 1.407 billion hectares, out of a total of 4.924 billion hectares of land used for agriculture.

Arable land area (1000 ha)
Rank	Country or region	2015	2016	2017	2018	2019
1	United States	156,645	157,191	157,737	157,737	157,737
2	India	156,413	156,317	156,317	156,317	156,067
3	Russia	121,649	121,649	121,649	121,649	121,649
4	China	119,593	119,512	119,477	119,475	119,474
5	Brazil	54,518	55,140	55,762	55,762	55,762
6	Canada	38,282	38,530	38,509	38,690	38,648
7	Nigeria	34,000	34,000	34,000	34,000	34,000
8	Ukraine	32,775	32,776	32,773	32,889	32,924
9	Argentina	36,688	35,337	33,985	32,633	32,633
10	Australia	31,090	30,057	30,752	30,974	30,573

Share of land area used for arable agriculture

Share of arable land which is organic

Fertilizer use in kg per hectare of arable land

Arable land use per person

=== Arable land (hectares per person) ===
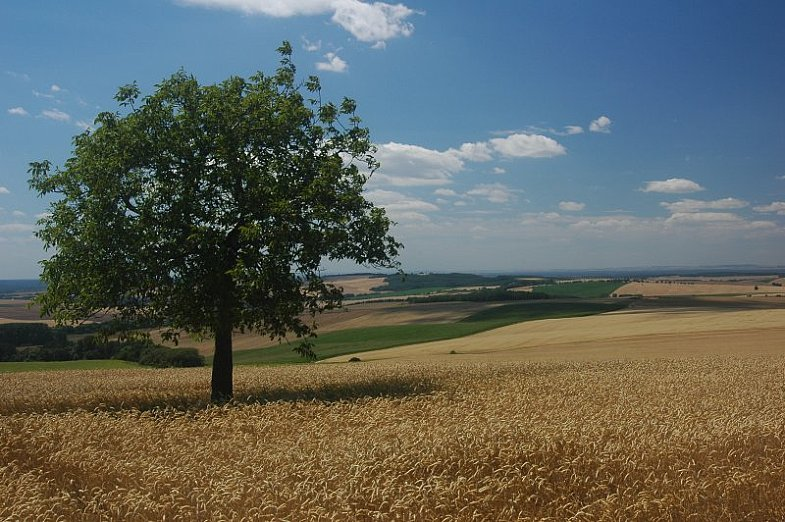
Fields in the region of Záhorie in Western Slovakia

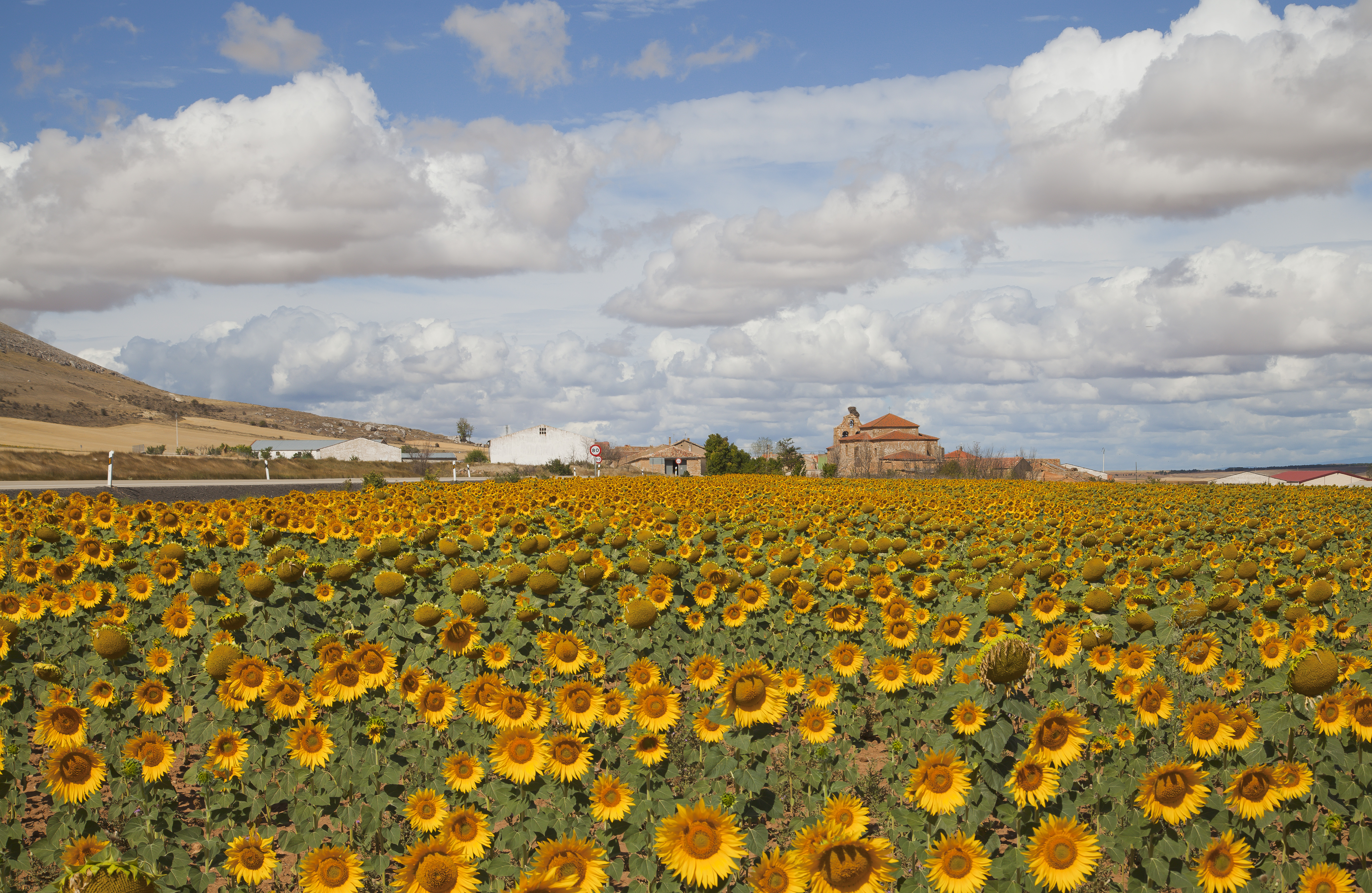
A field of sunflowers in Cardejón, Spain

Arable land (hectares per person)
Country Name	2013
Afghanistan	0.254
Albania	0.213
Algeria	0.196
American Samoa	0.054
Andorra	0.038
Angola	0.209
Antigua and Barbuda	0.044
Argentina	0.933
Armenia	0.150
Aruba	0.019
Australia	1.999
Austria	0.160
Azerbaijan	0.204
Bahamas, The	0.021
Bahrain	0.001
Bangladesh	0.049
Barbados	0.039
Belarus	0.589
Belgium	0.073
Belize	0.227
Benin	0.262
Bermuda	0.005
Bhutan	0.133
Bolivia	0.427
Bosnia and Herzegovina	0.264
Botswana	0.125
Brazil	0.372
British Virgin Islands	0.034
Brunei Darussalam	0.012
Bulgaria	0.479
Burkina Faso	0.363
Burundi	0.115
Cabo Verde	0.108
Cambodia	0.275
Cameroon	0.279
Canada	1.306
Cayman Islands	0.003
Central African Republic	0.382
Chad	0.373
Channel Islands	0.026
Chile	0.074
China	0.078
Colombia	0.036
Comoros	0.086
Congo, Dem. Rep.	0.098
Congo, Rep.	0.125
Costa Rica	0.049
Côte d'Ivoire	0.134
Croatia	0.206
Cuba	0.278
Curaçao	
Cyprus	0.070
Czech Republic	0.299
Denmark	0.429
Djibouti	0.002
Dominica	0.083
Dominican Republic	0.078
Ecuador	0.076
Egypt, Arab Rep.	0.031
El Salvador	0.120
Equatorial Guinea	0.151
Eritrea	
Estonia	0.480
Ethiopia	0.160
Faroe Islands	0.062
Fiji	0.187
Finland	0.409
France	0.277
French Polynesia	0.009
Gabon	0.197
Gambia, The	0.236
Georgia	0.119
Germany	0.145
Ghana	0.180
Gibraltar	
Greece	0.232
Greenland	0.016
Grenada	0.028
Guam	0.006
Guatemala	0.064
Guinea	0.259
Guinea-Bissau	0.171
Guyana	0.552
Haiti	0.103
Honduras	0.130
Hong Kong SAR, China	0.000
Hungary	0.445
Iceland	0.374
India	0.123
Indonesia	0.094
Iran, Islamic Rep.	0.193
Iraq	0.147
Ireland	0.242
Isle of Man	0.253
Israel	0.035
Italy	0.113
Jamaica	0.044
Japan	0.033
Jordan	0.032
Kazakhstan	1.726
Kenya	0.133
Kiribati	0.018
Korea, Dem. People's Rep.	0.094
Korea, Rep.	0.030
Kosovo	
Kuwait	0.003
Kyrgyz Republic	0.223
Lao PDR	0.226
Latvia	0.600
Lebanon	0.025
Lesotho	0.119
Liberia	0.116
Libya	0.274
Liechtenstein	0.070
Lithuania	0.774
Luxembourg	0.115
Macao SAR, China	
Macedonia, FYR	0.199
Madagascar	0.153
Malawi	0.235
Malaysia	0.032
Maldives	0.010
Mali	0.386
Malta	0.021
Marshall Islands	0.038
Mauritania	0.116
Mauritius	0.060
Mexico	0.186
Micronesia, Fed. Sts.	0.019
Moldova	0.510
Monaco	
Mongolia	0.198
Montenegro	0.013
Morocco	0.240
Mozambique	0.213
Myanmar	0.203
Namibia	0.341
Nauru	
Nepal	0.076
Netherlands	0.062
New Caledonia	0.024
New Zealand	0.123
Nicaragua	0.253
Niger	0.866
Nigeria	0.197
Northern Mariana Islands	0.019
Norway	0.159
Oman	0.010
Pakistan	0.168
Palau	0.048
Panama	0.148
Papua New Guinea	0.041
Paraguay	0.696
Peru	0.136
Philippines	0.057
Poland	0.284
Portugal	0.107
Puerto Rico	0.017
Qatar	0.007
Romania	0.438
Russian Federation	0.852
Rwanda	0.107
Samoa	0.042
San Marino	0.032
São Tomé and Príncipe	0.048
Saudi Arabia	0.102
Senegal	0.229
Serbia	0.460
Seychelles	0.001
Sierra Leone	0.256
Singapore	0.000
Sint Maarten (Dutch part)	
Slovak Republic	0.258
Slovenia	0.085
Solomon Islands	0.036
Somalia	0.107
South Africa	0.235
South Sudan	
Spain	0.270
Sri Lanka	0.063
St. Kitts and Nevis	0.092
St. Lucia	0.016
St. Martin (French part)	
St. Vincent and the Grenadines	0.046
Sudan	0.345
Suriname	0.112
Swaziland	0.140
Sweden	0.270
Switzerland	0.050
Syrian Arab Republic	0.241
Tajikistan	0.106
Tanzania	0.269
Thailand	0.249
Timor-Leste	0.131
Togo	0.382
Tonga	0.152
Trinidad and Tobago	0.019
Tunisia	0.262
Turkey	0.270
Turkmenistan	0.370
Turks and Caicos Islands	0.030
Tuvalu	
Uganda	0.189
Ukraine	0.715
United Arab Emirates	0.004
United Kingdom	0.098
United States	0.480
Uruguay	0.682
Uzbekistan	0.145
Vanuatu	0.079
Venezuela, RB	0.089
Vietnam	0.071
Virgin Islands (US)	0.010
West Bank and Gaza	0.011
Yemen, Rep.	0.049
Zambia	0.243
Zimbabwe	0.268

== Non-arable land ==
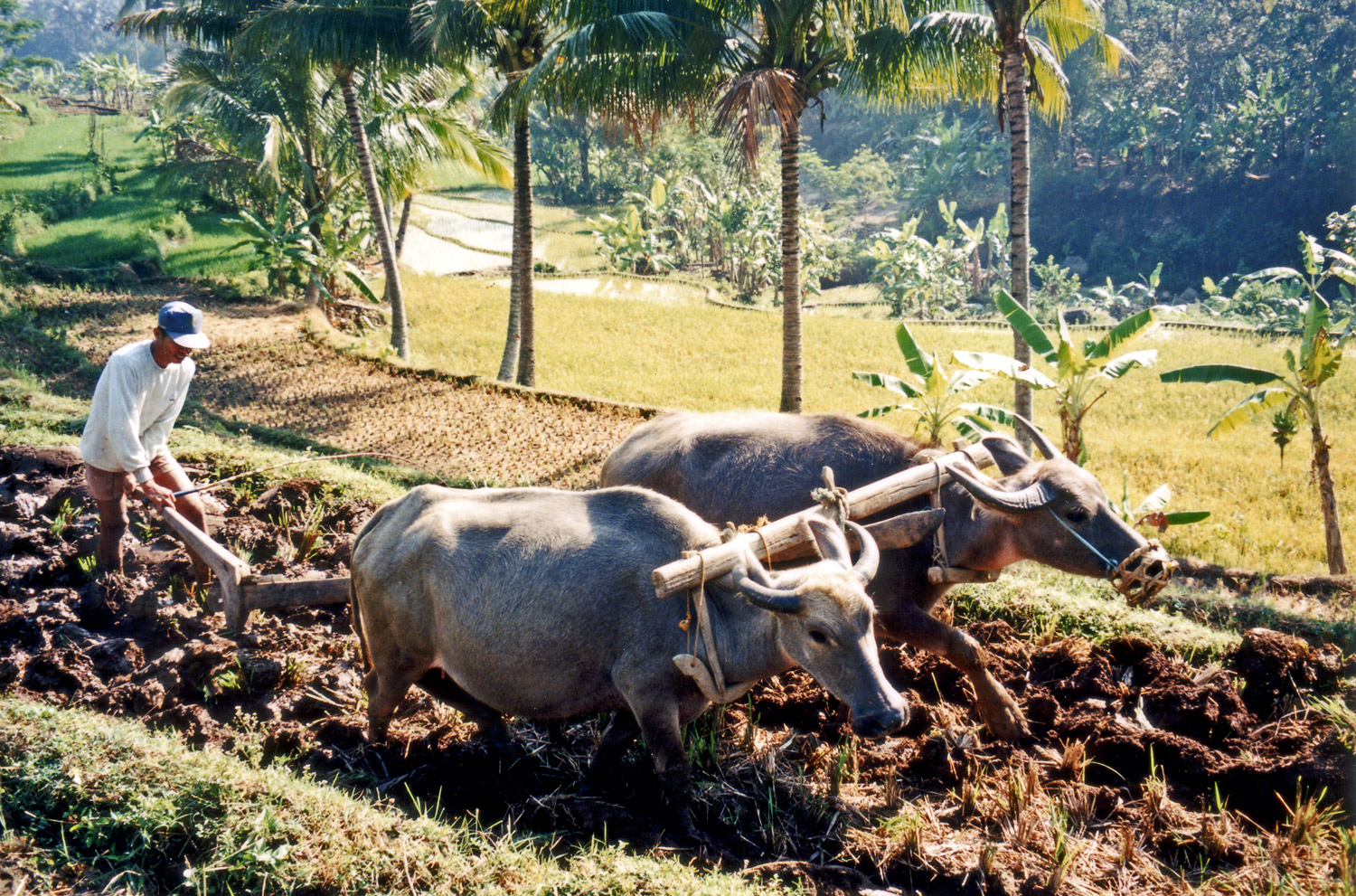
Water buffalo ploughing rice fields near Salatiga, Central Java, Indonesia

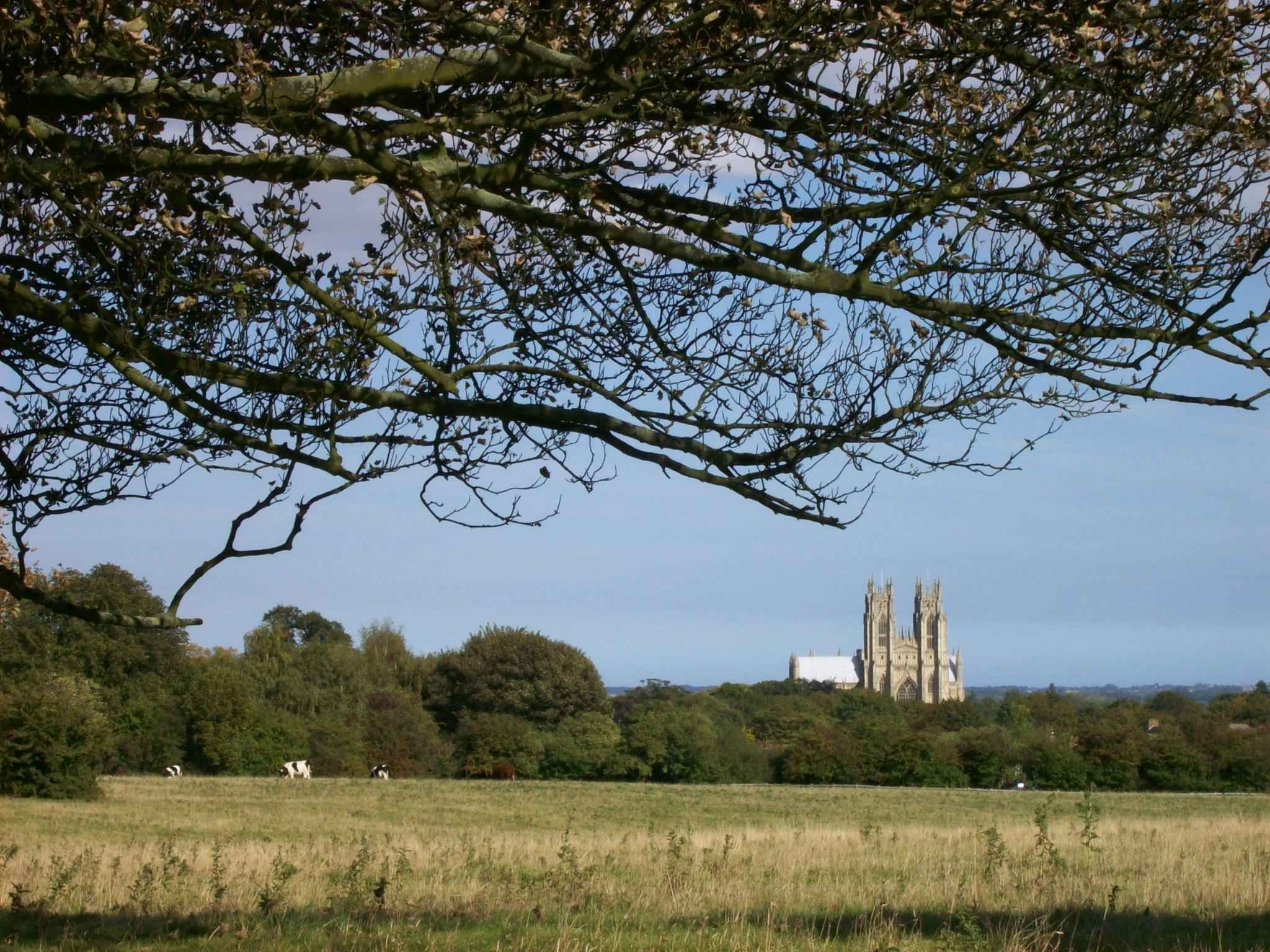
A pasture in the East Riding of Yorkshire in England

Agricultural land that is not arable according to the FAO definition above includes:

- Meadows and pastures – land used as pasture and grazed range, and those natural grasslands and sedge meadows that are used for hay production in some regions.
- Permanent crop – land that produces crops from woody vegetation, e.g. orchard land, vineyards, coffee plantations, rubber plantations, and land producing nut trees;

Other non-arable land includes land that is not suitable for any agricultural use. Land that is not arable, in the sense of lacking capability or suitability for cultivation for crop production, has one or more limitations – a lack of sufficient freshwater for irrigation, stoniness, steepness, adverse climate, excessive wetness with the impracticality of drainage, excessive salts, or a combination of these, among others. Although such limitations may preclude cultivation, and some will in some cases preclude any agricultural use, large areas unsuitable for cultivation may still be agriculturally productive. For example, United States NRCS statistics indicate that about 59 percent of US non-federal pasture and unforested rangeland is unsuitable for cultivation, yet such land has value for grazing of livestock. In British Columbia, Canada, 41 percent of the provincial Agricultural Land Reserve area is unsuitable for the production of cultivated crops, but is suitable for uncultivated production of forage usable by grazing livestock. Similar examples can be found in many rangeland areas elsewhere.

== Changes in arability ==
=== Land conversion ===
Land incapable of being cultivated for the production of crops can sometimes be converted to arable land. New arable land makes more food and can reduce starvation. This outcome also makes a country more self-sufficient and politically independent, because food importation is reduced. Making non-arable land arable often involves digging new irrigation canals and new wells, aqueducts, desalination plants, planting trees for shade in the desert, hydroponics, fertilizer, nitrogen fertilizer, pesticides, reverse osmosis water processors, PET film insulation or other insulation against heat and cold, digging ditches and hills for protection against the wind, and installing greenhouses with internal light and heat for protection against the cold outside and to provide light in cloudy areas. Such modifications are often prohibitively expensive. An alternative is the seawater greenhouse, which desalinates water through evaporation and condensation using solar energy as the only energy input. This technology is optimized to grow crops on desert land close to the sea.

The use of artifices does not make the land arable. Rock still remains rock, and shallow – less than 6 feet (1.8 metres) – turnable soil is still not considered toilable. The use of artifice is an open-air non-recycled water hydroponics relationship. The below described circumstances are not in perspective, have limited duration, and have a tendency to accumulate trace materials in soil that either there or elsewhere cause deoxygenation. The use of vast amounts of fertilizer may have unintended consequences for the environment by devastating rivers, waterways, and river endings through the accumulation of non-degradable toxins and nitrogen-bearing molecules that remove oxygen and cause non-aerobic processes to form.

Examples of infertile non-arable land being turned into fertile arable land include:

- Aran Islands: These islands off the west coast of Ireland (not to be confused with the Isle of Arran in Scotland's Firth of Clyde) were unsuitable for arable farming because they were too rocky. The people covered the islands with a shallow layer of seaweed and sand from the ocean. Today, crops are grown there, even though the islands are still considered non-arable.
- Israel: The construction of desalination plants along Israel's coast allowed agriculture in some areas that were formerly desert. The desalination plants, which remove the salt from ocean water, have produced a new source of water for farming, drinking, and washing.
- Slash and burn agriculture uses nutrients from the wood ash, but these are exhausted within a few years.
- Terra preta, fertile tropical soils produced by adding charcoal.

=== Land degradation ===
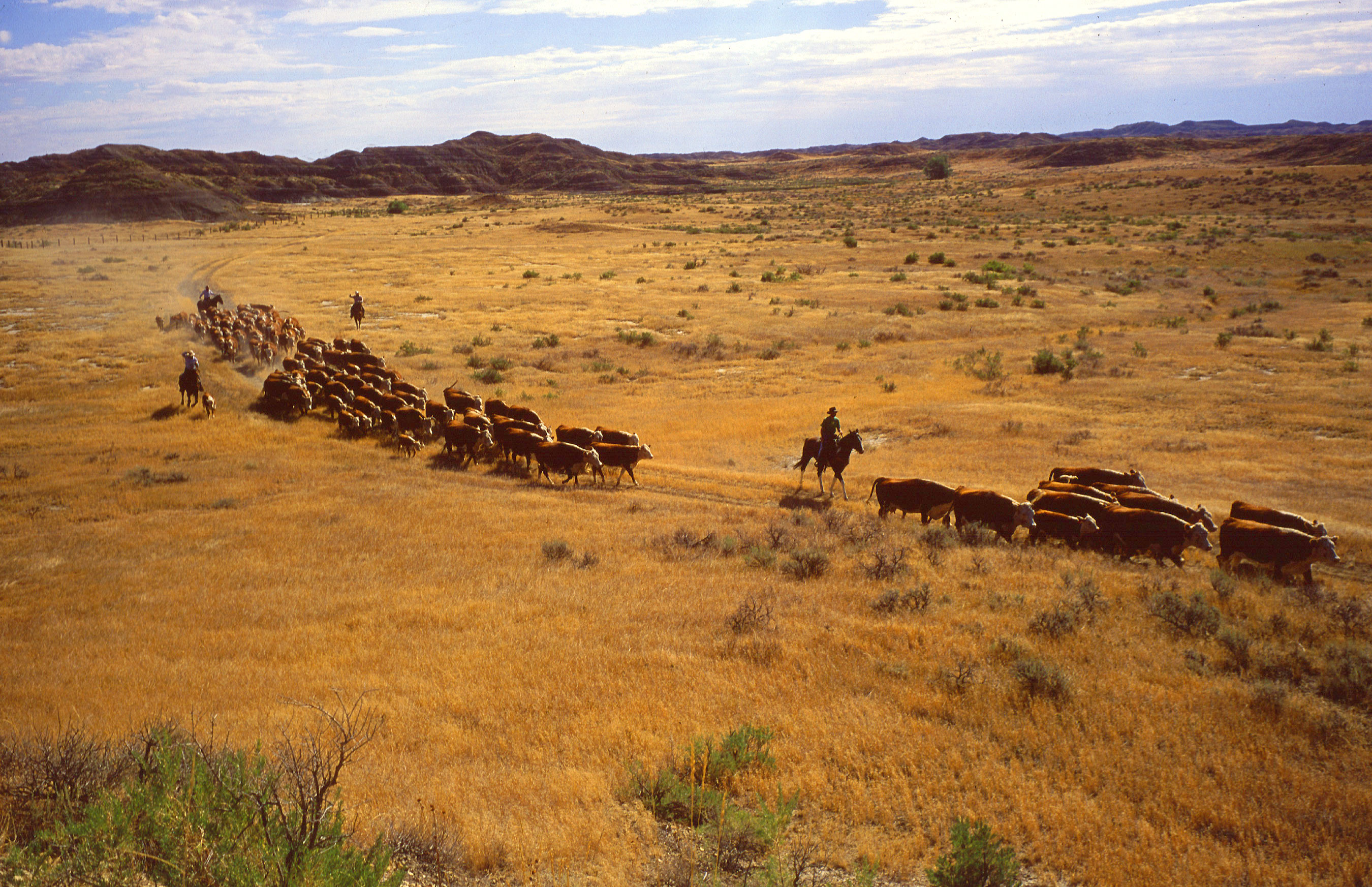
Overgrazing by livestock can lead to land degradation.

Land degradation is a process where land becomes less healthy and productive due to a combination of human activities or natural conditions. The causes for land degradation are numerous and complex. Human activities are often the main cause, such as unsustainable land management practices. Natural hazards are excluded as a cause; however human activities can indirectly affect phenomena such as floods and wildfires.

By 2025 unsustainable farming and management practices led to the degradation of 996 Mha of agricultural lands; this accounts for over 60% of human-induced land degradation, which affects a total area of more than 1660 million hectares.

One of the impacts of land degradation is that it can diminish the natural capacity of the land to store and filter water leading to water scarcity. Human-induced land degradation and water scarcity are increasing the levels of risk for agricultural production and ecosystem services.

The United Nations estimate that about 30% of land is degraded worldwide, and about 3.2 billion people reside in these degrading areas, giving a high rate of environmental pollution. Land degradation reduces agricultural productivity, leads to biodiversity loss, and can reduce food security as well as water security. It was estimated in 2007 that up to 40% of the world's agricultural land is seriously degraded, with the United Nations estimating that the global economy could lose $23 trillion by 2050 through degradation.

==== Examples ====
Examples of fertile arable land being turned into infertile land include:

- Droughts such as the "Dust Bowl" of the Great Depression in the US turned farmland into desert.
- Each year, arable land is lost due to desertification and human-induced erosion. Improper irrigation of farmland can wick the sodium, calcium, and magnesium from the soil and water to the surface. This process steadily concentrates salt in the root zone, decreasing productivity for crops that are not salt-tolerant.
- Rainforest deforestation: The fertile tropical forests are converted into infertile desert land. For example, Madagascar's central highland plateau has become virtually totally barren (about ten percent of the country) as a result of slash-and-burn deforestation, an element of shifting cultivation practiced by many natives.
- According to a study published in the journal, Science, toxic heavy metals can contaminate arable land.

== See also ==
- Development easement
- Land use statistics by country
- List of environment topics
- Soil fertility
