= Development easement =

A development easement is a legal agreement by which a landowner surrenders the right to develop a designated parcel of property. Some local and state governments have programs to acquire development easements from private landowners to prevent conversion of farmland to other uses.
