= Jaray (village) =

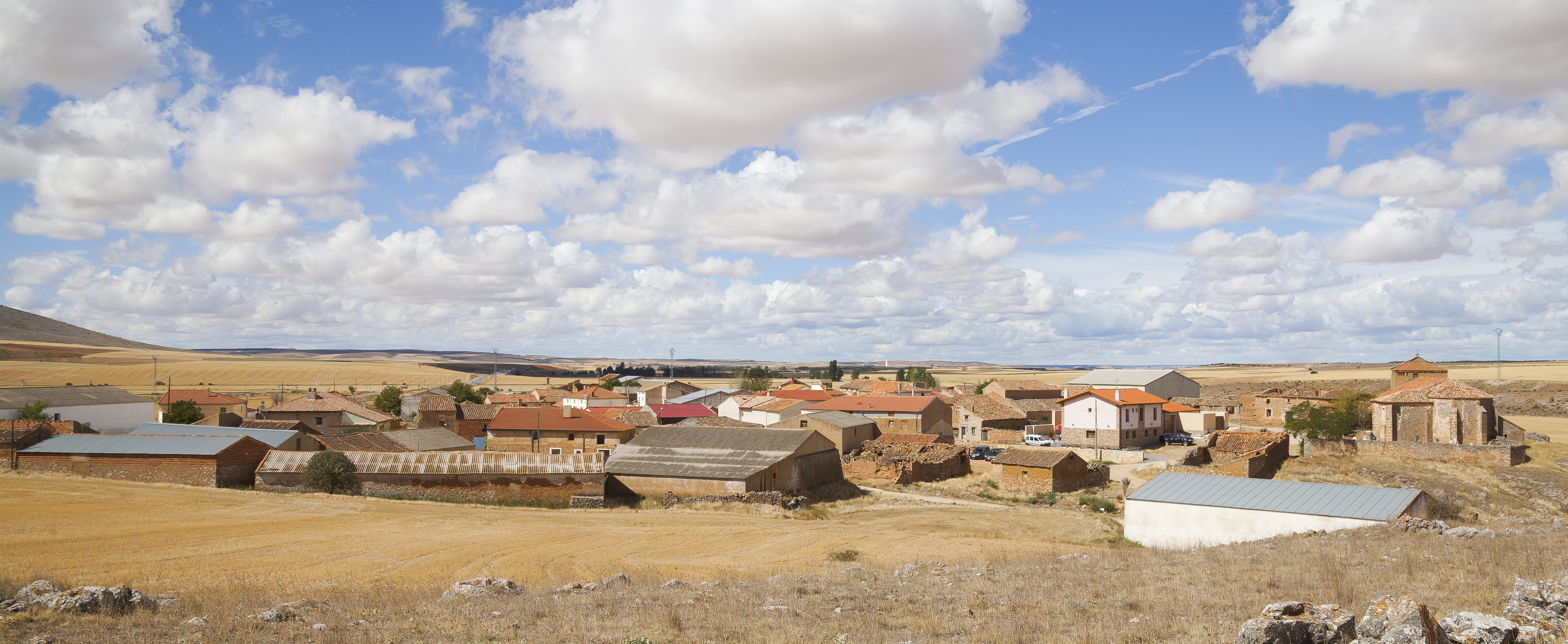

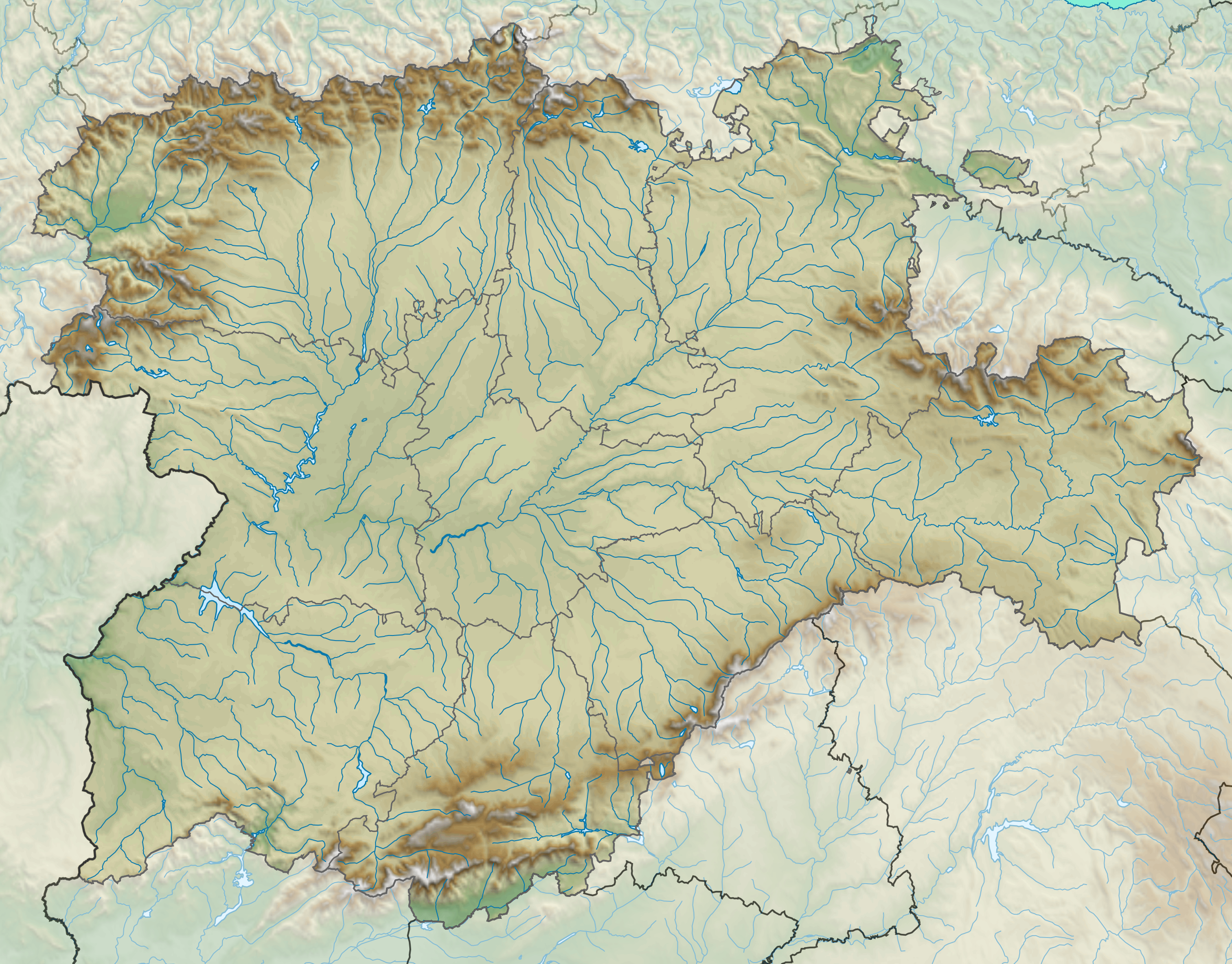
- Location within Castile and León Location within Spain
- Coordinates: 41°41′N 2°7′W
- Country: Spain
- Autonomous community: Castile and León
- Province: Soria
- Municipality: Almenar de Soria

Population (2024)
  - Total: 18
- Time zone: UTC+1 (CET)
  - Summer (DST): UTC+2 (CEST)

Jaray is a village belonging to the Spanish municipality of Almenar de Soria, province of Soria, Castile and León. It is located 7 kilometers from the municipal capital. It is served by the CL-101 road, in the route from Ágreda to Almazán. The Rituerto river passes nearby.

The placename comes from vulgar Arabic (sa harig), referencing a body of water (a 'raft', 'pond' or 'well'). After the conquest of the area by Alfonso I of Aragon, Jaray (cited as Xarahe) became a hamlet of the land of Soria within the sexmo of Arciel. In 2007, it had a population of 28 inhabitants.
