= Almenar de Soria =

- Municipality
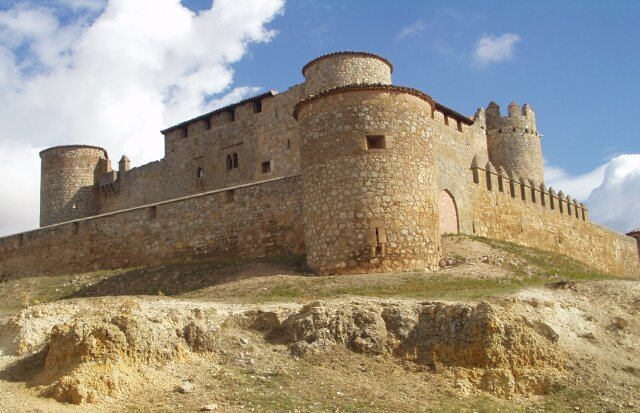
- Castle of Almenar

- Flag Coat of arms

- Location in Spain. Almenar de Soria (Spain)
- Country: Spain
- Autonomous community: Castile and León
- Province: Soria
- Municipality: Almenar de Soria

Area
  - Total: 106 km^{2} (41 sq mi)
- Elevation: 1,007 m (3,304 ft)

Population (2025-01-01)
  - Total: 233
  - Density: 2.20/km^{2} (5.69/sq mi)
- Time zone: UTC+1 (CET)
  - Summer (DST): UTC+2 (CEST)
- Website: Official website

Almenar de Soria is a municipality located in the province of Soria, Castile and León, Spain.

According to the 2004 census (INE), the municipality had a population of 342 inhabitants. The village of Jaray belongs to the municipality.

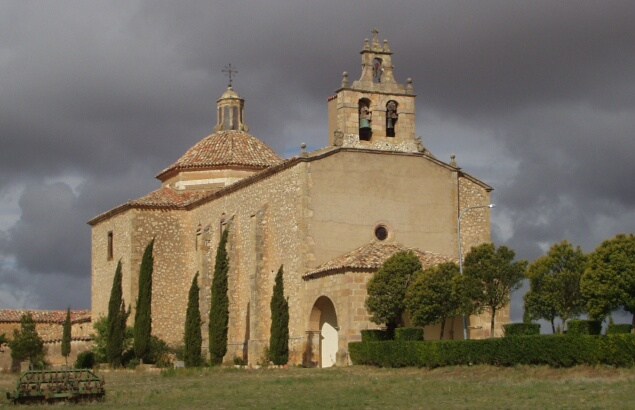
Church of Almenar.
