= Cardejón =

- Town
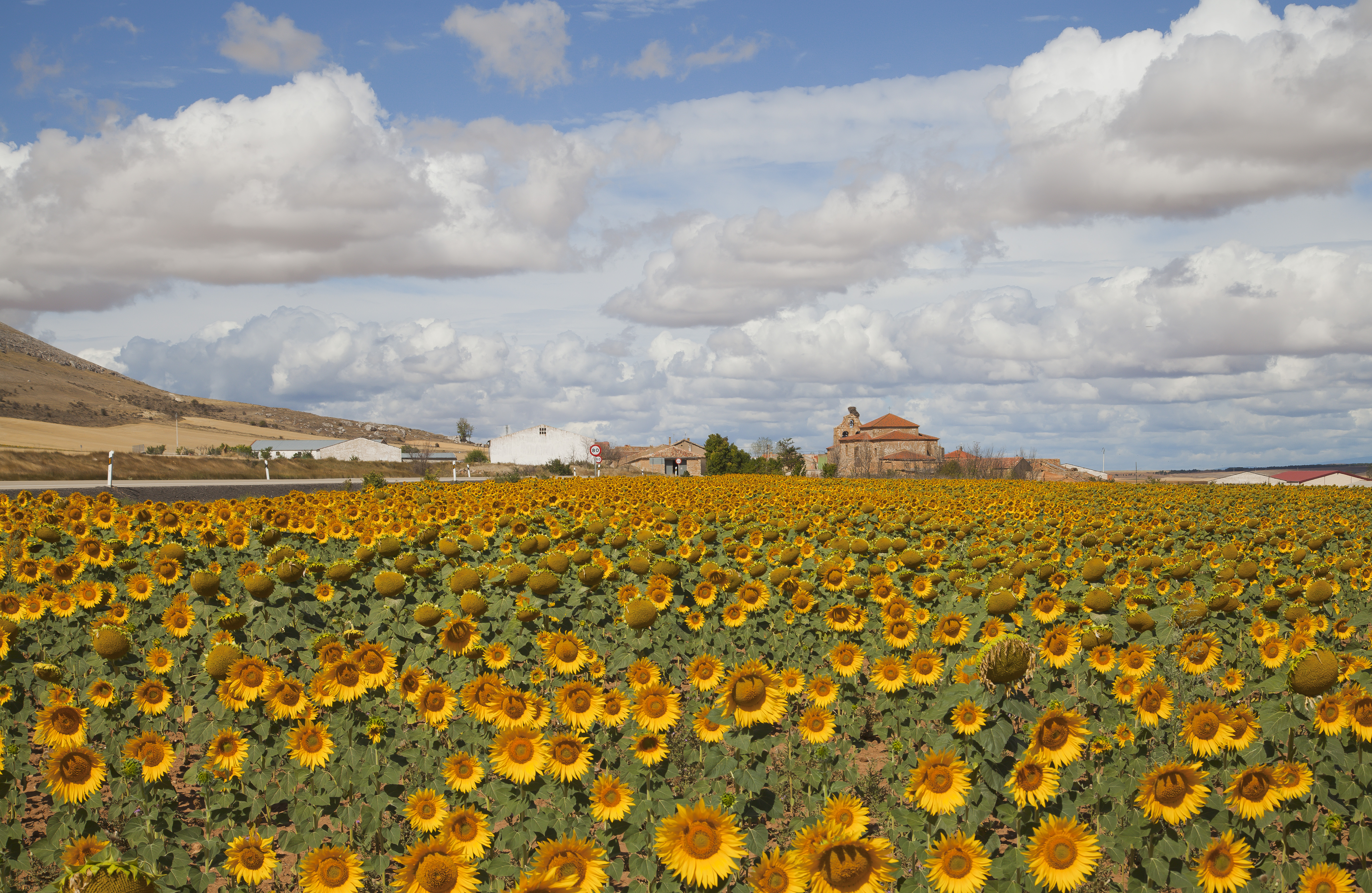
- Iglesia de Nuestra Señora de La Blanca, Cardejón, España
- Interactive map of Cardejón
- Country: Spain
- Autonomous community: Castile and León
- Province: Soria
- Municipality: Almenar de Soria

Population (2010)
  - Total: 32

Cardejón is a town in the province of Soria, judicial district of Soria, Castile and León, Spain . Belonging to the municipality of Almenar de Soria.

From a hierarchical point of view of the Catholic Church is part of the Diocese of Osma which, in turn, belongs to the Archdiocese of Burgos.

In 1981 it had 64 inhabitants concentrated in the core, from 32 in 2010, 18 men and 14 women.
