= Lena Braun =

German contemporary artist

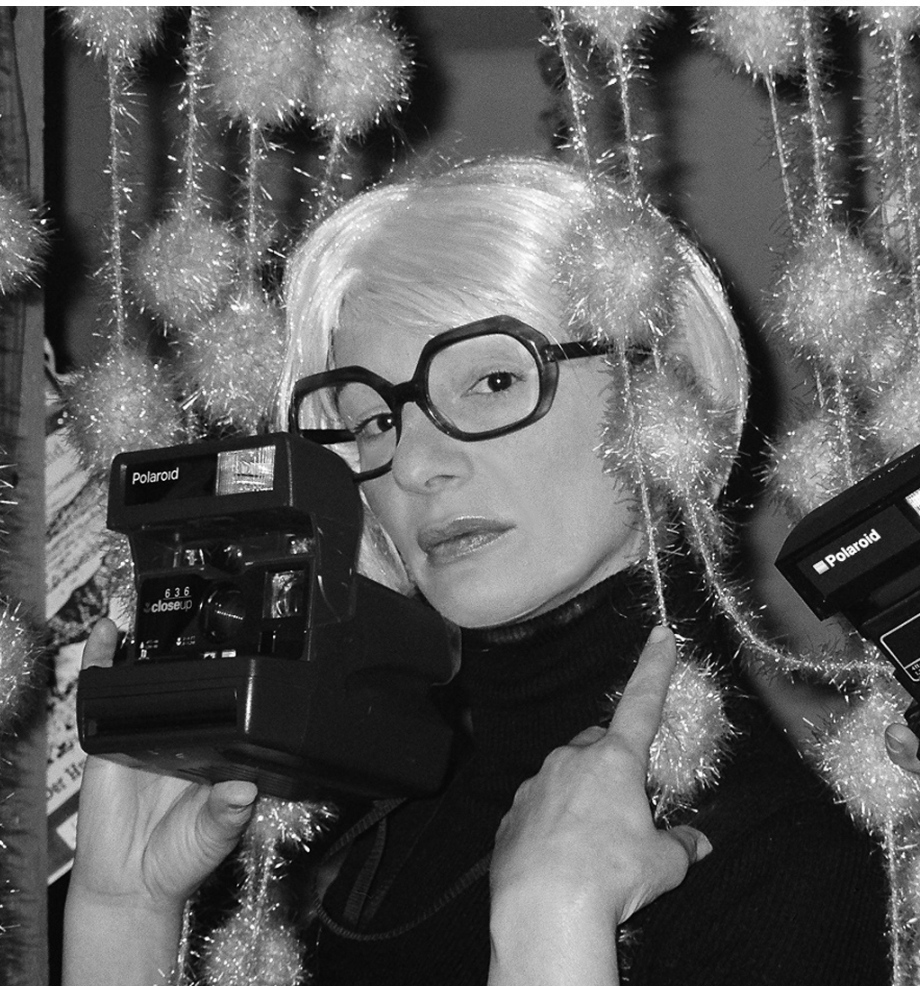
- Lena Braun as Andy Warhol
- Born: 4 April 1961 (age 65); Wuppertal, Germany
- Education: FU Berlin
- Known for: Performance art, Visual arts, Curatorial projects

Lena Braun (born April 4, 1961, in Wuppertal, Germany) is a Berlin-based artist, curator and author. She works as a cross-genre artist in the fields of performance and visual arts, often addressing non-normative femininity and gender expression. The art spaces that she has curated since 1988 have earned her the reputation of being a "Grand Dame" of Berlin's art scene.

== Life and career ==
Braun grew up in western Germany and came to Berlin in 1981 to study at FU Free University. In 1987, she wrote her master's thesis on the novel "The Tigress: A Strange Love Story" by Walter Serner. In 1988, she opened the first of her – to this day - 9 art spaces in Berlin. The art magazine Kunstforum International called it a "meeting place for the young, experimental art scene" and Braun soon made a name for herself as "a real diva of Berlin's cultural scene". One of her art spaces, the Boudoir in Berlin-Mitte (1991 – 1995), was honored by the Museum of Modern Art (MoMA) in New York with the exhibition “Boudoir in Exile and is now considered the “First Queer Art Salon” in Berlin.

In 1993, she founded the Queen Barbie Lodge, defined as an “underground organization” for women artists. The lodge, which Braun chaired until 2009, was the female counterpart to an all-male association called Lord Jim Lodge, operated by artists like Martin Kippenberger and Albert Oehlen (among others). The Queen Barbie Lodge regularly organized exhibitions and performances ironizing sexism and championing female empowerment. The Berlin city magazine Tip wrote: “Lena Braun aka Queen Barbie is not only a curator, but also a visual artist and above all an intrepid performer. As a curator, she … mainly promotes and exhibits female artists, without being dogmatic about it.”

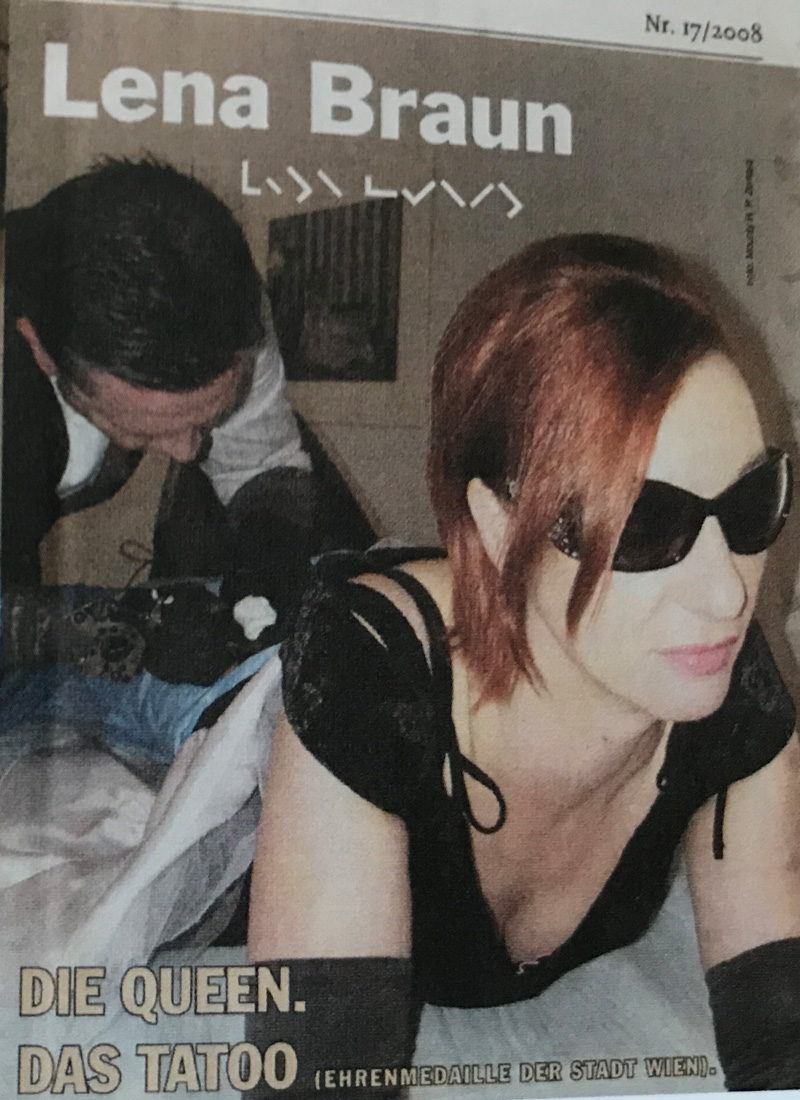
Viennese magazine ST/A/R about a life tattoo session with Lena Braun aka Queen Barbie

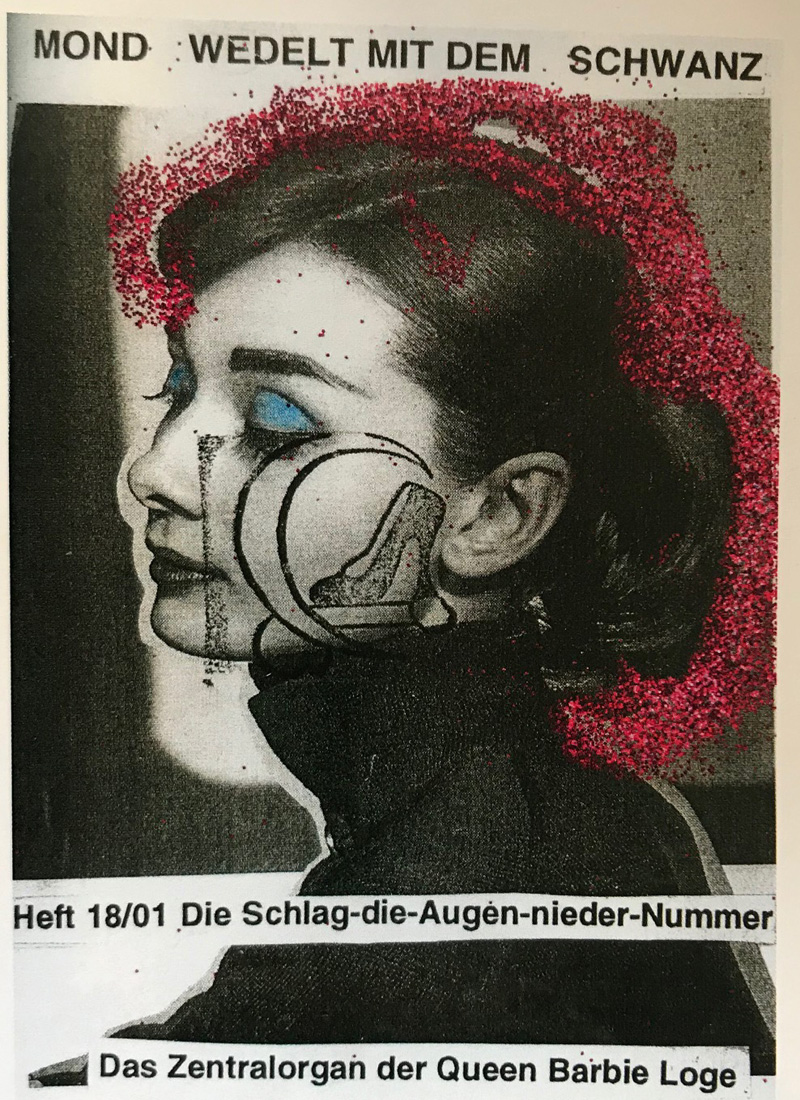
Periodical of the Queen Barbie Lodge. Braun published 36 issues between 1993 and 2008

Alongside her curatorial projects, Lena Braun also works as a freelance author and artist. In the 1990s and 2000s, she wrote plays, acted in films and published a periodical for the Queen Barbie Lodge (36 issues, Xerox art). In 2013 she founded a literary label called Edition Fortyfour, where she publishes her novels. Braun's artistic oeuvre includes performances, collages and installations. She exhibits both in Germany and internationally.

== Art Spaces ==
Lena Braun has been initiating and curating art spaces in Berlin since 1988. She sees her spaces as installations, i.e. artificial environments that stage art (as opposed to showing it in a white cube). For an exhibition on "Today's Avant-Garde" at the Kindl Center for Contemporary Art in Berlin (2017) Braun created an installation that reflects her point of view: "My art spaces are campy environments that shape alternative queer lifestyles and suspend classic markers of social exclusion such as age, origin, or saleability."

=== Braun's art spaces in Berlin (selection) ===
- 2017 – 2019 BARBICHE, Potsdamerstraße, Schöneberg, Berlin
- 2009 – 2014 SU DE COUCOU, Weserstraße, Neukölln, Berlin
- 2003 – 2007 BARBIE DEINHOFF's, Schlesische Straße, Kreuzberg, Berlin
- 1991 – 1995 BOUDOIR, Brunnenstraße, Berlin-Mitte
- 1989 LOULOU LASARD, Crellestraße, Schöneberg, Berlin
- 1988 BICHETTE, Fürbringerstraße, Kreuzberg, Berlin

The press often focuses on the ambience in which Braun presents art. The British Guardian, for example, listed her art space Barbie Deinhoff's as one of the ten best bars in Berlin. The German national weekly Die Zeit described another of her art spaces, the BOUDOIR, as a mixture of "club, gallery and art happening".

Similar comments were made by media such as Die Welt, Die tageszeitung and Tagesspiegel.

In a recent interview with the Berlin-based radio station RBB, Braun described this very mix as intentional: Her art spaces, says Braun, are social spaces meant to transcend art world elitism.

== Film ==
Braun appeared in several films, among them Gender X, which premiered at the Berlin International Film Festival in 2005 and B-Movie: Lust & Sound in West-Berlin 1979-1989, which was released in 2015.

Braun was a voice actress in Nekromantik 2, and she co-wrote and co-directed a film for German television (“Der hellblaue Engel”, The Light-Blue Angel, 1996).

In 2007, she wrote and directed the video “Hairspray II", based on the Film Hairspray by John Waters (director). Braun also played the role of "Mom". The video was shown in Amsterdam in 2010 and in Berlin in 2021

== Stage: plays and performances ==
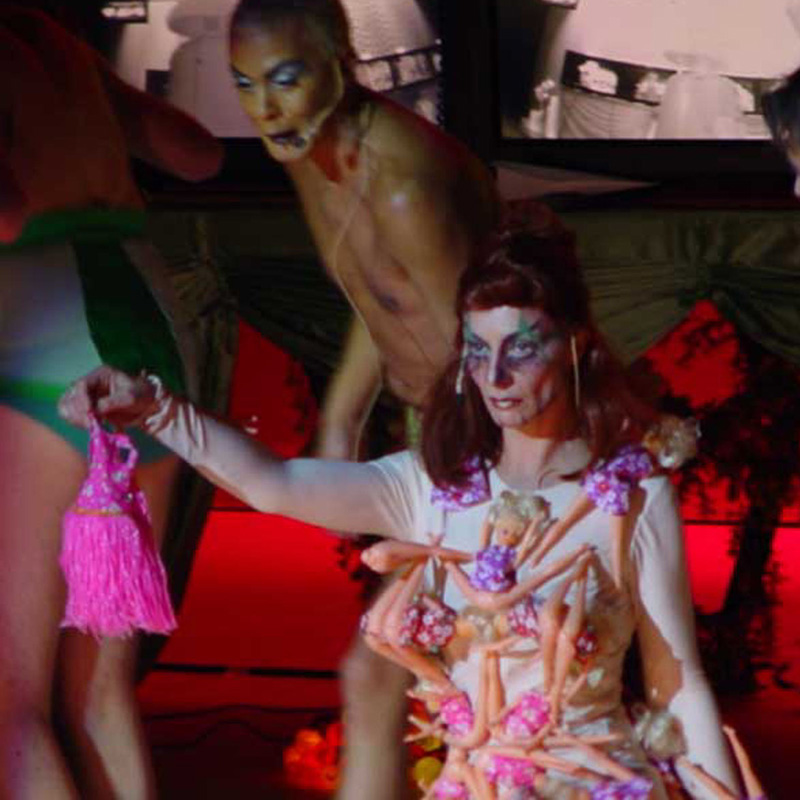
Lena Braun performing in "Ski-fi Jenni" in Paris, a play by Robyn Orlin

Braun performed in Robyn Orlin's play “Ski-fi-Jenni”, with performances in Montpellier, Paris and Berlin (2002).

Braun also wrote, produced and directed own plays, among them:

- The Queer Version of Nibelungen. A revue for 36 performers queering the historic saga of the Germanic Nibelung clan (premiered 2000 in Berlin, BKA-Theater).
- Die Hassfabrik (The Hate Factory). A one-act play on female rampage killers (premiered 2003 in Wels, Austria.
- All About Eve II. A performance with 4 actresses undoing Eve's expulsion from paradise (premiered 2009 in Berlin).

== Literature ==
In 2013, Lena Braun published three novels in homage to Djuna Barnes: Ladies Almanach, Nachtschatten, Tyler. The titles echo those chosen by Barnes: Ladies Almanack, Nightwood, Ryder. Braun's novels tell stories that reflect and rewrite the ones Barnes told: For example, Braun's Ladies Almanach transposes the lesbian circle in Paris that Barnes portrayed in 1928 to Berlin in the 1990s. Braun's homage also simulates the editorial gesture: Like Barnes, who published her Almanack as a private print, Braun self-published her novels, founding the literary label EDITION FortyFour for this purpose.

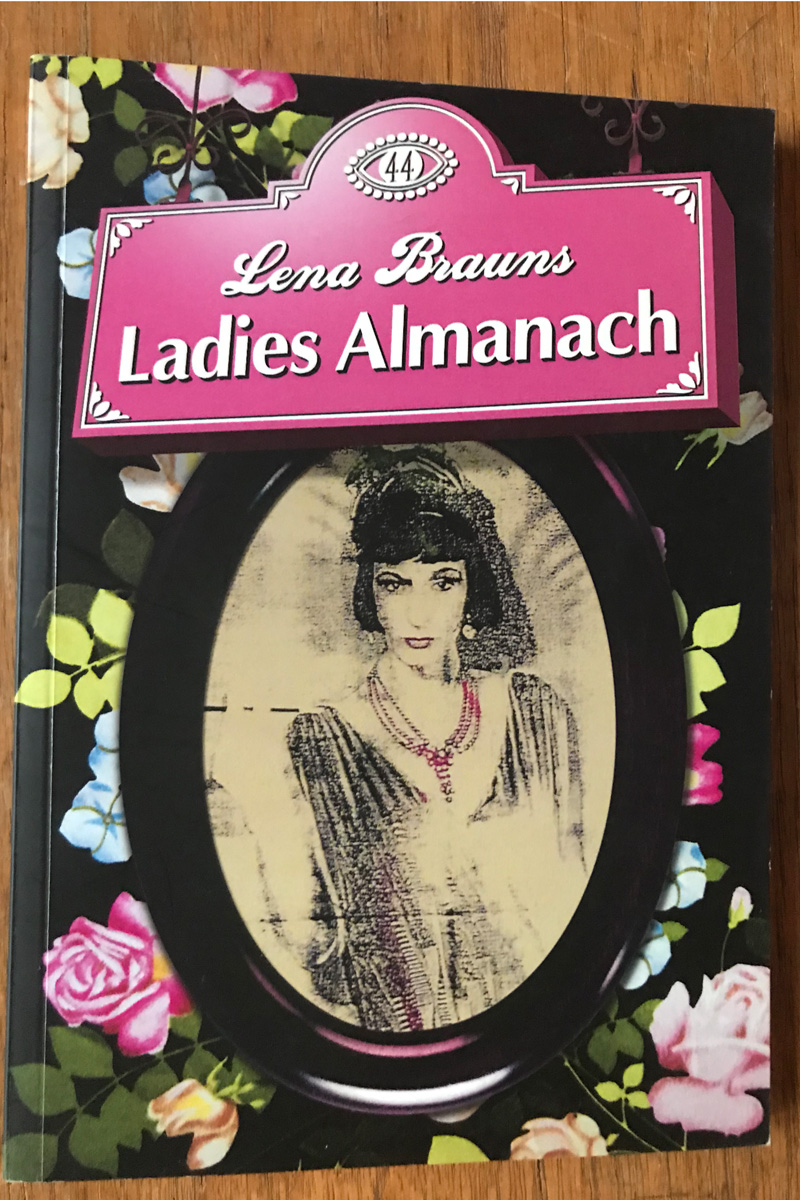
Braun's novel "Ladies Almanach", a tribute to Djuna Barnes and her book "Ladies Almanack"

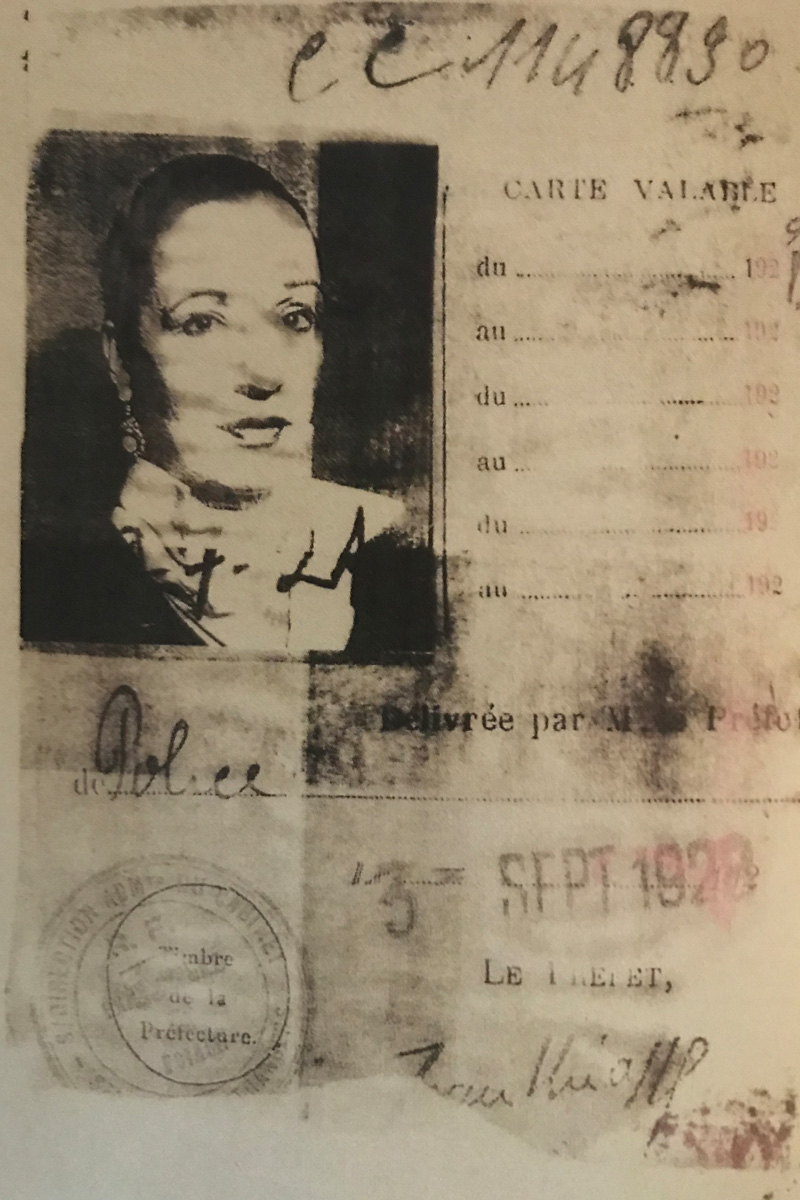
Lena Braun staging herself as Djuna Barnes

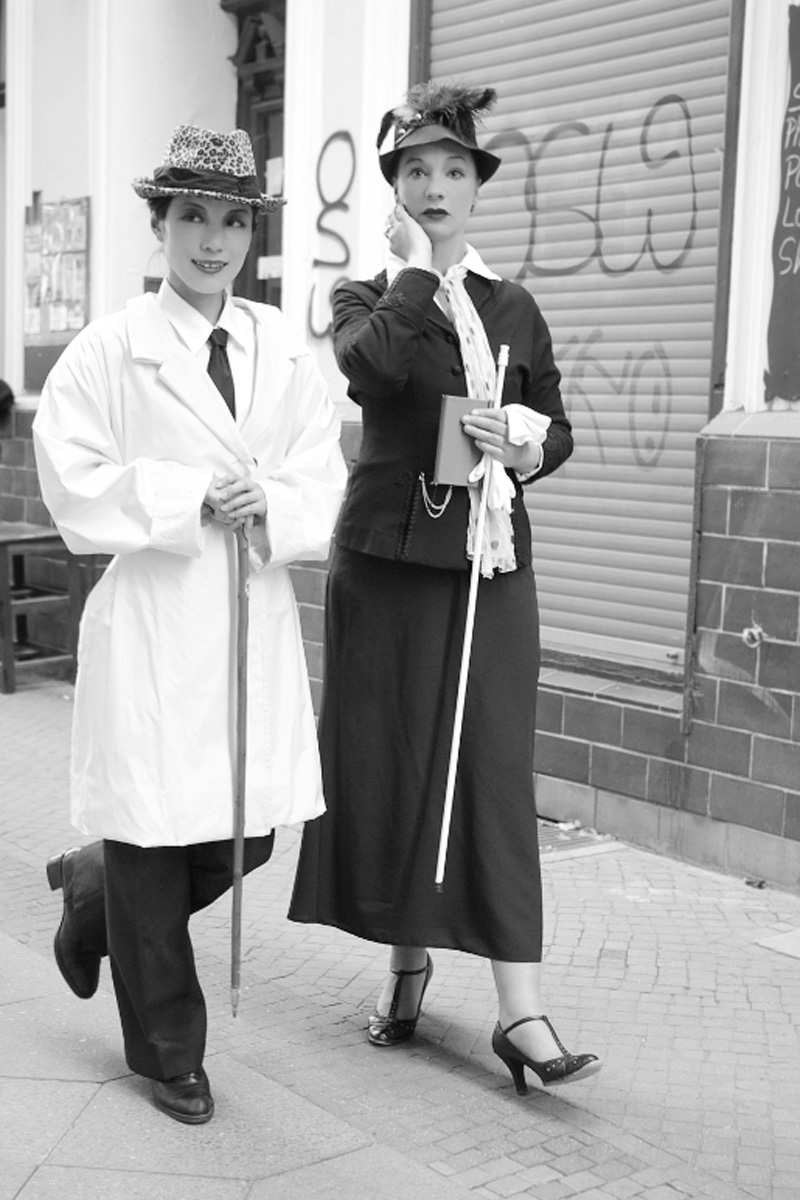
Lena Braun performing as Djuna Barnes, with Charlie Chaplin (aka artist Shou). Photo: Iris Weirich

=== Texts (selected) ===
All texts & publications are in German:

- Braun, Lena (2017 – 2021). Hinterzimmer in Heaven I und II (novel, still unpublished)
- Braun, Lena (2013). Ladies Almanack. Berlin: Edition Fourtyfour. ISBN 978-3-944865-00-3
- Braun, Lena (2013). Nachtschatten/Tyler. Berlin: Edition Fourtyfour. ISBN 978-3-944865-01-0
- Braun, Lena (2013). Ladies Almanack. Berlin: Edition Fourtyfour. ISBN 978-3-944865-00-3
- Braun, Lena (1999 – 2009). 36 issues of a periodical published for the Queen Barbie Lodge
- Braun, Lena. Plays: The Queer Version of Nibelungen, The Hate Factory, All About Eve II (manuscripts)

== Prints, collages, installations ==
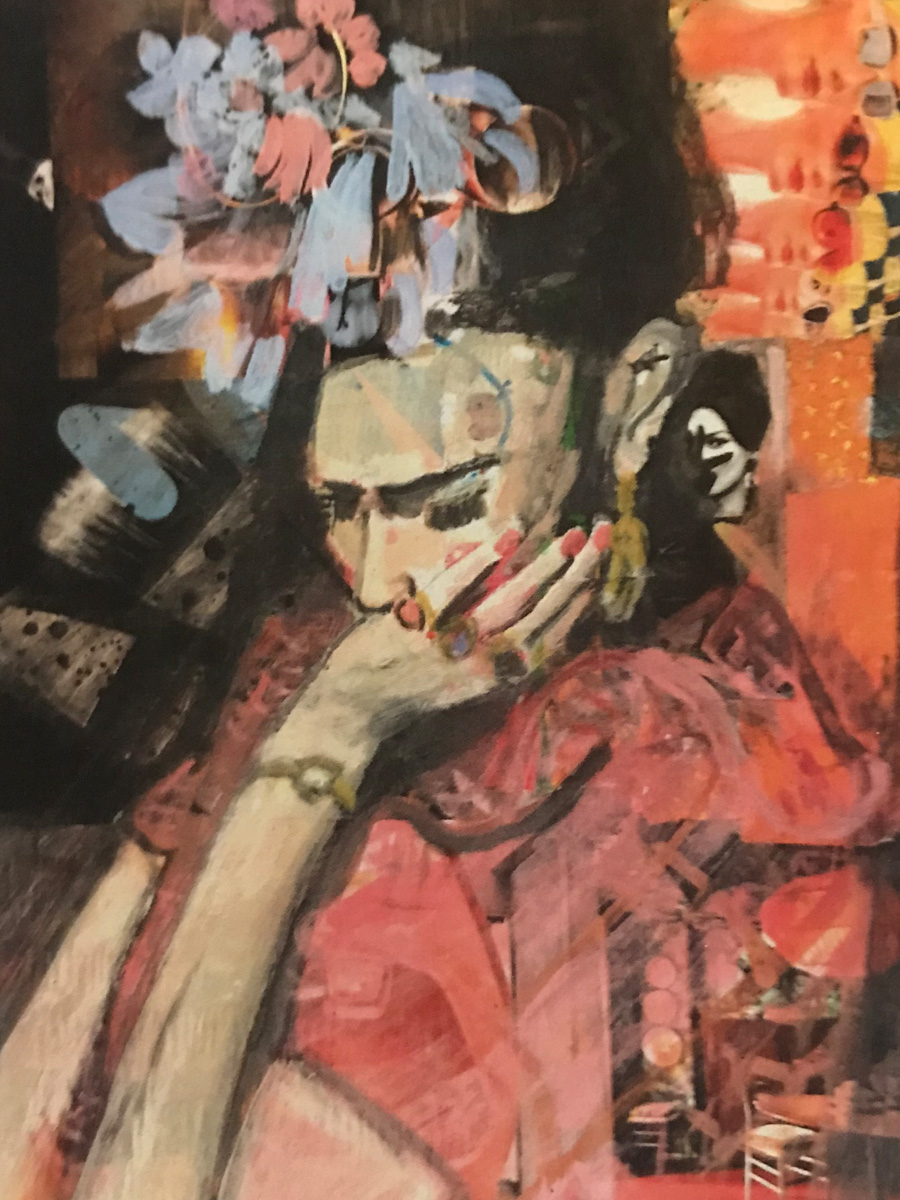
Lena Braun, Hommage to Frida Kahlo. Mixed Media.2016

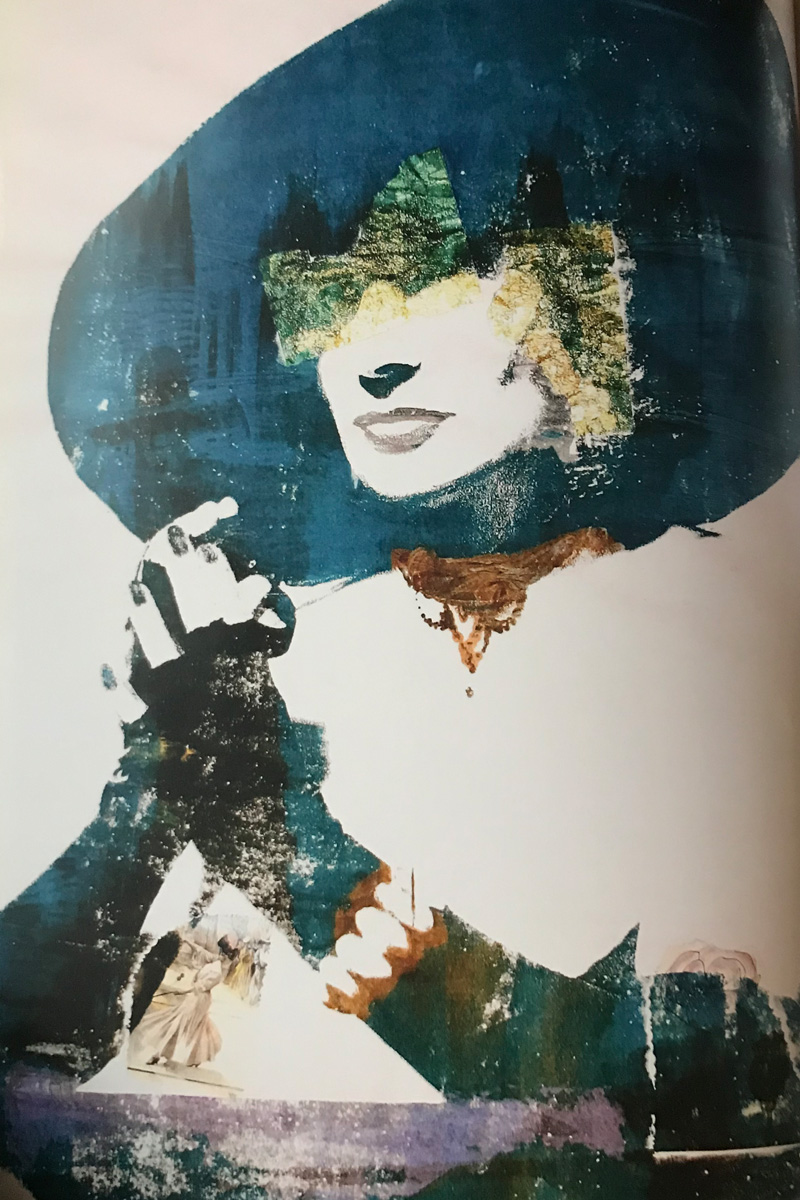
Lena Braun as Hedy Lamarr in a hat. Series: Divamania, 2012

Braun is a multi-genre artist in the fields of visual and performance art. In her performances, Braun often puts herself in the roles of famous women artists, reenacting scenes from their lives. The reenactments are captured in photos. Braun is present in the images as an art director and performer:

"As a performer I often slip into the skin of others, Djuna Barnes, for example, or Peggy Guggenheim, Anita Berber or Hedy Lamarr. I incorporate biographical scraps, and gradually this creates a kind of rage - a rage that suspects the truth but can't grasp it. I always do long research for these performances. They are an attempt to revive history, or rather, repressed and misrepresented history.”

Braun processes the photos taken during performances into prints and collages. Her works have been exhibited both in Germany and abroad. In 2020, they were shown in the U.S., alongside works by Elsa von Freytag-Loringhoven and as part of the exhibition "The Art of Djuna Barnes." The genres of collage and installation remain central to Braun's work today, with a wide range of materials including found objects of all kinds.

"I find materials everywhere, in the street, in the garden, and while travelling. I immortalize the carelessly discarded and give it a new meaning."

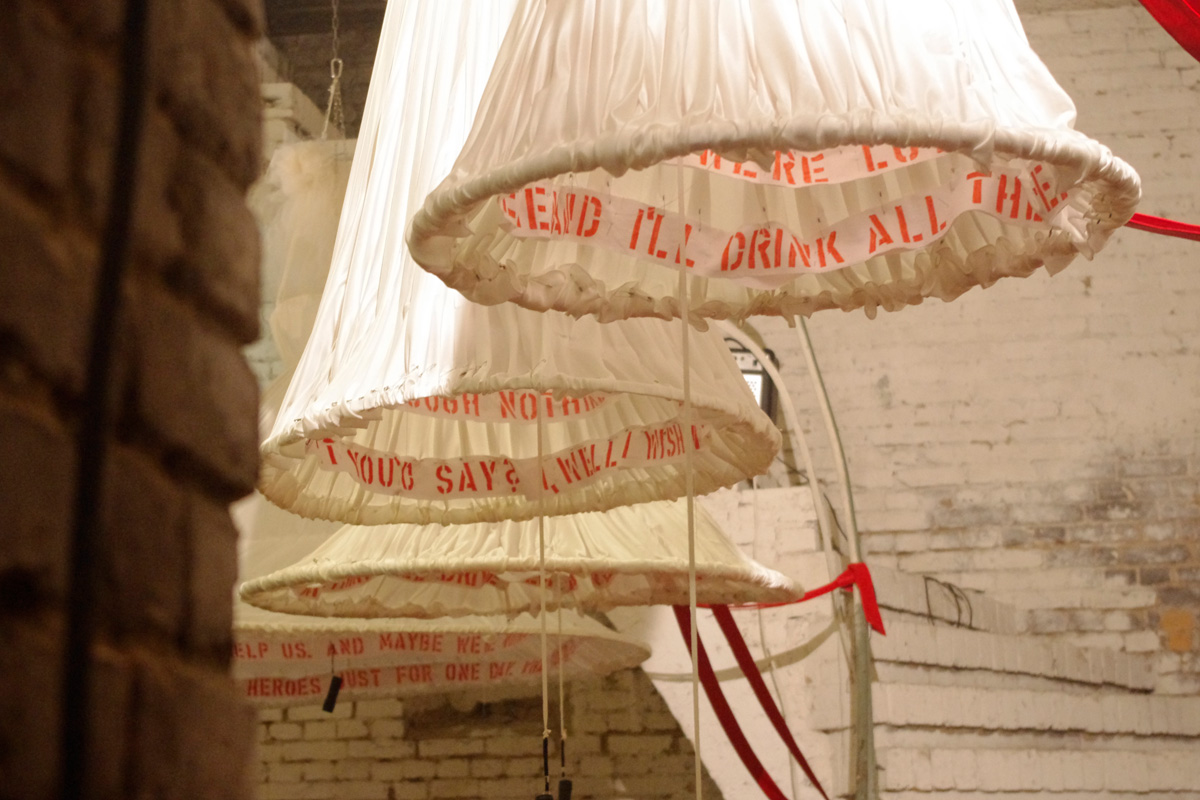
Lena Braun. Installation for the exhibition Super Power Women Show No.2, Berlin 2017

In 2017, she created an installation of discarded ball gowns from the Vienna Opera Ball, that was shown in Berlin in 2017 and at the art festival open art Lausitz in South Brandenburg in 2021.

Since 2019, Lena Braun has been producing woven objects and concrete sculptures. For her, the 100th anniversary of the German art school Bauhaus was an invitation to suspend its gender code - concrete for men, weaving for women – by working in both media. The genre of collage also plays a central role here: Braun's woven objects often collage textile with non-textile materials. Her concrete casts immortalize found objects in sculptural works that turn into a kind of time capsule.

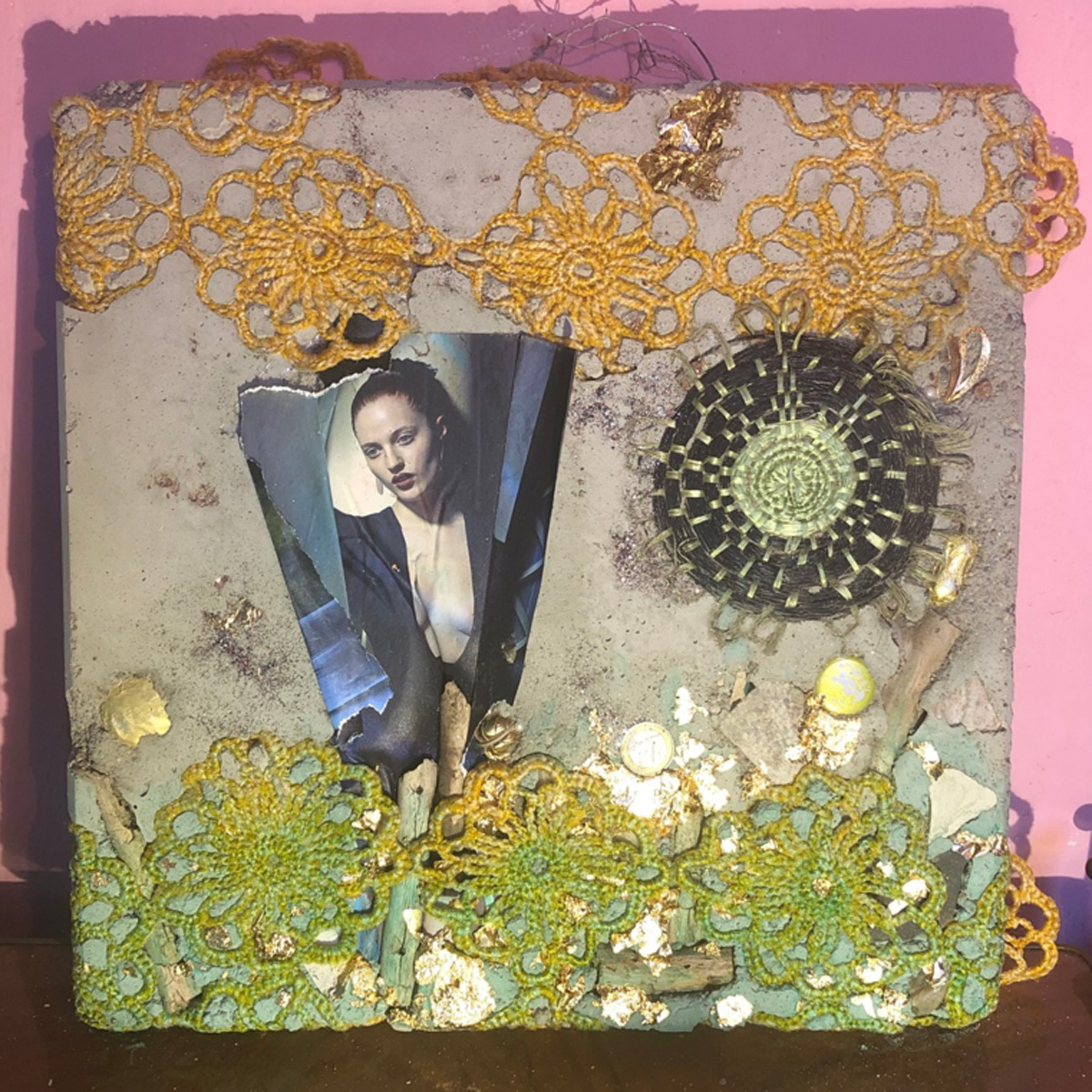
Lena Braun. Concrete sculpture. Untitled, 2021

== Exhibitions ==
=== Solo exhibitions (selected) ===
- 2019 The Women of Bauhaus, Galerie Walden, Berlin, Germany
- 2017 Homage to Frida Kahlo and other women artists, Galerie Woyy, Berlin, Germany
- 2015 Homage to Peggy Guggenheim, Kunstraum Gerry Wruss, Venice, Italy
- 2013 Divamania, Galerie „Reinraum“, Düsseldorf, Germany
- 2012 Retrospective 2007 – 2012, Galerii Fotografi, Rzeszow, Poland
- 2010 Retrospective 1999 – 2009, Gallery Su de Coucou, Berlin, Germany
- 2007 Zuchthausköder, Black Box Theater, Oslo, Norway

=== Group shows (selected) ===
- 2020 Open Studios, Atelierhof Werenzhain, Werenzhain, Germany[43].
- 2020 Across the Pane: The Art of Djuna Barnes, University of Maryland Art Gallery, USA
- 2019 CROSS-OVER-ME, art space BARBICHE, Berlin, Germany
- 2018 Hommage á Palomo Spain, art space BARBICHE, Berlin, Germany
- 2017 Up and Down, KINDL Center for Contemporary Art, Berlin, Germany
- 2016 GOLDTRAIN, Gallery K-Salon, Berlin, Germany
- 2014 Winter Art Fair, Gallery The Ballery, Berlin, Germany
- 2012 Divamania, GRID Photofestival, Amsterdam, Netherlands

== Art projects (selected) ==
- 2020 Opening “Effis Haus” in Brandenburg, Germany (a studio house named after Effi Briest)
- 2009 Curating “Stigma”, a performance festival, SO36, Berlin, Germany
- 2008 Curating the group exhibition “Rotes Haus”, Kunstraum Bethanien, Berlin, Germany
- 2006 Scenic reading of the play „Melancholie ist Luxus“ at Salon Noir, Neue Nationalglerie, Berlin, Germany
- 2004 Participating in an art festival hosted by Forum Stadtpark, Graz, Austria
- 1994 Curating the exhibition „Boudoir in Exile“ at MoMa P.S.1, New York, USA
- 1993 Founding of the Queen Barbie Lodge, an underground organization for women artists
