= John Ferrar Holms =

British literary critic (1897–1934)

John Ferrar Holms MC (1897–1934) was a British literary critic.

== Early life ==
He was born in India to a British civil servant and an Irish mother. Holms was educated at Rugby School and Sandhurst. During the First World War he was commissioned in 1915 as a second lieutenant in the Highland Light Infantry, and awarded the Military Cross in 1917. In March 1918 he was captured and was held as a prisoner of war at Mainz Citadel with, among others, Hugh Kingsmill, J. Milton Hayes and Alec Waugh.

== Career ==
He published literary criticism in the Calendar of Modern Letters between 1925 and 1927 and one short story titled "A Death." He was associated with Djuna Barnes, Edwin Muir, Emily Coleman, Antonia White, and Peggy Guggenheim. Holms was Peggy Guggenheim's lover from 1928 to his sudden death in 1934. Djuna Barnes dedicated her novel Nightwood to Holms and Guggenheim. His time spent at the 14th-Century manor Hayford Hall in Devon, in 1932 and 1933 with Djuna Barnes and Emily Coleman had a profound effect on Barnes and Nightwood.
