= The Antiphon =

Play by Djuna Barnes

- Author: Djuna Barnes
- Language: English
- Genre: Modernist Verse Drama
- Publisher: Faber and Faber
- Publication date: 1958
- Media type: Print (hardcover, paperback)

The Antiphon (1958) is a three-act verse tragedy by Djuna Barnes. Set in England in 1939 after the beginning of World War Two, the drama presents the Hobbs family reunion in the family's ancestral home, Burley Hall. The play features many of the themes or motifs that run through Barnes's work, including betrayal, familial relations, regression and transgression. The dialogue is highly stylized and poetic.

The play premiered in 1961 in Stockholm in a Swedish translation by Karl Ragnar Gierow and U.N. Secretary-General Dag Hammarskjöld. Despite the fact that Barnes continued to write until her death in 1983, it was the last of her major works to be published. Although it was not as successful as Nightwood, Barnes considered it her most important work.

== Synopsis ==
The play tells the story of the reunion of Augusta Hobbs, her brother, Jonathan Burley, and her four estranged adult children: Dudley, Elisha, Miranda and Jeremy. The play begins with the arrival at Burley Hall of Miranda, a 'tall woman in her late fifties', and a coachman, Jack Blow, that she has met in Dover during her journey to England from France. She reveals that, along with her sibling, uncle and mother, she has been summoned by her youngest brother Jeremy to the family's ancestral home. However, Jeremy is nowhere to be found upon their arrival. The building has not been occupied for some time and is in a state of dilapidation thanks to German bombing campaigns; the house's former contents are sprawled all over the set.

Miranda is shortly joined by her uncle, Jonathan Burley, as well as her two brothers, Dudley, a manufacturer of watches and Elisha, a publicist, and later by her mother, Augusta. As they wait for Jeremy, they discuss family history and air old grievances, many of them about the family's deceased patriarch, Titus Hobbs. Dudley and Elisha exhibit a strong dislike for Miranda and their mother, playing a number of increasingly cruel and violent tricks upon them. Miranda starts to suspect that the invitation might have been a trap set by Dudley and Elisha to lure them to the home and murder them. Augusta, however, remains oblivious to her sons' behavior. Miranda and Augusta argue, with Miranda suggesting that just as Augusta was blind to the sexual and physical abuse she suffered at the hands of her father, she is also blind to the murderous intent that her sons present towards her.

The final act begins with all the characters asleep on stage. Jeremy has still not arrived. Augusta, unable to sleep, begins to playact as if she was a young woman once again and that the traumatic events she has lived through have not happened. Miranda silently watches with horror and empathy. She tries to warn Augusta again of the violent dangers posed by Dudley and Elisha. However, Augusta, believing Miranda to be betraying her own family, smashes her skull with a curfew bell and kills her. Jack then reveals that he is, in fact, Jeremy and that he invited them to the house with the intent that the family would implode as they have. When he is asked why he did it by his uncle, he responds that 'This is the hour of the uncreate; | The season of the sorrowless lamenting'. The play ends with Jonathan Burley watching his nephew, Jeremy, silently and 'with what appears to be indifference' leave the stage.

== Publication history ==
Barnes started writing the play in the early 1950s, and unlike her other major works, many of the early manuscript drafts still exist. They can be consulted in her archives at The University of Maryland. In 1954, once Barnes had completed writing the play, she sent it to T.S. Eliot at Faber & Faber, who previously published Nightwood and with whom she had developed a strong friendship. Eliot was initially uncertain of the play's merits, indeed in a letter responding to it he explained that he had struggled to fully comprehend it. Nonetheless, he enlisted the poet and critic Edwin Muir to read the manuscript, who claimed the play "a work of genius and utterly absurd." Muir did, however, suggest some editorial changes, especially to the first act, and Barnes produced a new draft of the play. In November 1956, with Muir and Eliot's recommendation, Faber & Faber agreed to publish the play, and Eliot agreed to write the preface for it as he had done for Nightwood. However, the draft preface he sent to Barnes ahead of the publication described the play as quixotic and Barnes as a writer with too much genius and not enough talent. Barnes was hurt, and Eliot withdrew the preface, but their friendship had been soured.

The editing process was extensive and intensive, with Eliot's working closely with Barnes on numerous drafts. Robert Giroux, her American publisher, recalled being sent 1,500 manuscript sheets from Faber & Faber when they published the play in the U.S.

== Performances ==
In 1956, Edwin Muir organised for the New York Poets Theatre to give a reading performance of an early draft of the play at Harvard Yard. Muir, Eliot and Barnes were present as well as a number of other literary figures, including Robert Lowell. In his biography of Barnes, Phillip Herring suggests that the performance was so bad that "Eliot's head sank into his hand; Muir became rigid [and] Barnes was furious".

The play received its first public performance in 1962 in Stockholm. It was translated into Swedish by Karl Ragnar Gierow and U.N. Secretary-General Dag Hammarskjöld, with the latter of whom Barnes became close friends. The play was directed by Gierow.

The Swedish performance remains the only major production of The Antiphon, and indeed, perhaps the only public performance of the play. Barnes's correspondence in her archive at the University of Maryland reveals that she often was contacted with requests to stage the play, but she invariably turned them down.

== Critical reception ==
In The New York Times Book Review, Dudley Fitts described the Antiphon as "dramatic poetry of a curious and high order' and highlighted that the pleasure of the play was to be found in 'the pleasure of language. Not spoken language; Miss Barnes has no ear for the stage, but the intricate, rich, almost viciously brilliant discourse, modeled more or less on the murkier post-Elizabethans." In the Times Literary Supplement, the anonymous reviewer suggested that "[t]here will always be one or two eccentrics who think 'The Antiphon' gives its author first place among women who have written verse in the English language."

In recent years, the play has been re-examined by literary critics. Daniela Casselli has argued that the play is an important work of modernist drama and 'stages the moment when drama collapses'.

The play was translated into French and set at the Odeon Theater in Paris by the “Comedie Française” in March 1990.
