= J. Milton Hayes =

English actor and poet

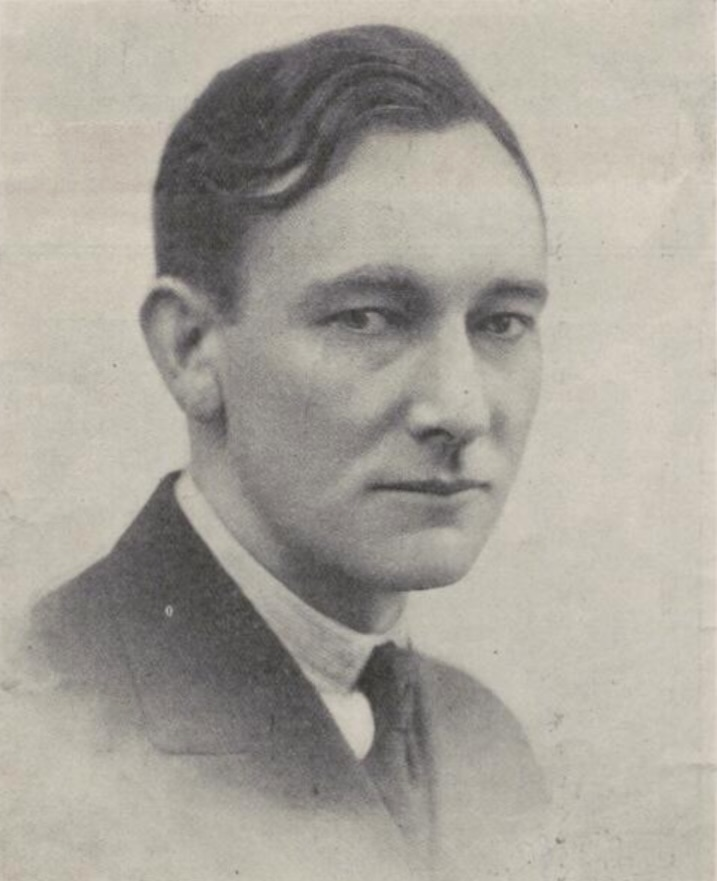
J. Milton Hayes in Australia in 1925

James Milton Hayes MC (1884, in Ardwick – 1940, in Nice), known as J. Milton Hayes, was an English actor and poet, best known for his 1911 dramatic monologue "The Green Eye of the Yellow God", much parodied by his contemporary Stanley Holloway and later by The Goon Show. He also wrote and performed many other monologues.

During the First World War he was commissioned in the Manchester Regiment, 31 December 1915 and awarded the Military Cross in November 1917. In 1918 he was captured and was held as a prisoner of war at Mainz Citadel with, among others, John Ferrar Holms, Hugh Kingsmill and Alec Waugh.

In his book My Brother Evelyn and Other Profiles Waugh describes Hayes as "A North Country man; he was nearly forty; he was brisk, assured, purposeful, with his eye on the main chance. He was the first person I heard analyse success." He gives Hayes's account of the writing of the poem:

I wrote The Green Eye of the Little Yellow God in five hours, but I had it all planned out. It isn't poetry and it does not pretend to be, but it does what it sets out to do. It appeals to the imagination from the start: those colours, green and yellow, create an atmosphere. Then India, everyone has his own idea of India. Don't tell the public too much. Strike chords. It is no use describing a house; the reader will fix the scene in some spot he knows himself. All you've got to say is 'India' and a man sees something. Then play on his susceptibilities.

His name was Mad Carew. You've got the whole man there. The public will fill in the picture for you. And then the mystery. Leave enough unsaid to make paterfamilias pat himself on the back. 'I've spotted it, he can't fool me. I'm up to that dodge. I know where he went.' No need to explain. Then that final ending where you began. It carries people back. You've got a compact whole. 'A broken-hearted woman tends the grave of Mad Carew' They'll weave a whole story round that woman's life. Every man's a novelist at heart. We all tell ourselves stories. That's what you've got to play on.

In John Lennon's posthumously released track "Nobody Told Me", the mention of a "little yellow idol to the north of Katmandu" in Lennon's song alludes to the first stanza from the Hayes poem, which reads: "There's a one-eyed yellow idol to the north of Kathmandu."
