= Ryder (novel) =

1928 novel by Djuna Barnes

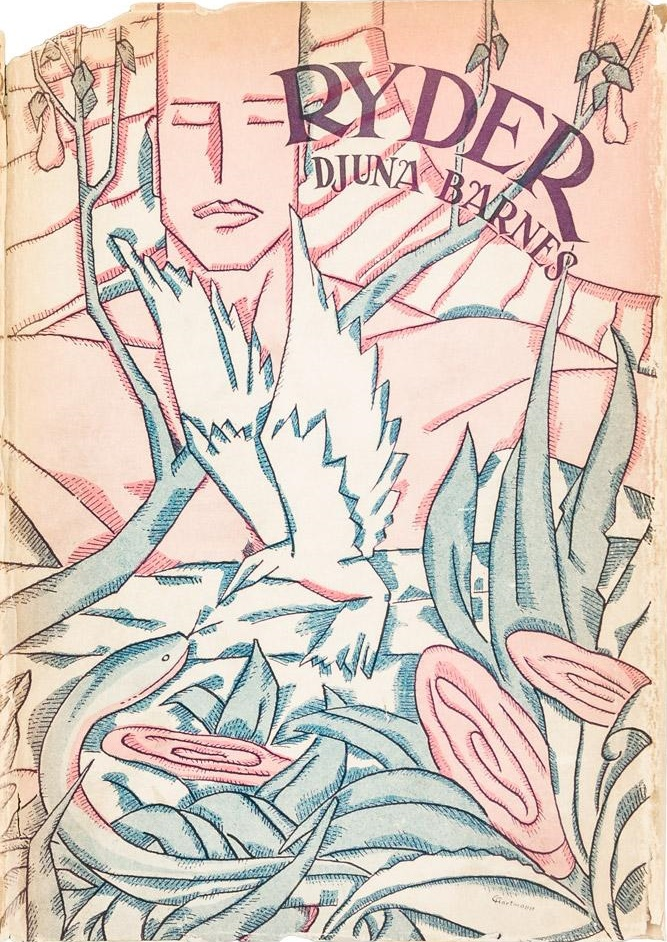
- Cover of first edition of the novel Ryder (1928) by Djuna Barnes
- Author: Djuna Barnes
- Language: English
- Genre: Modernist Novel
- Publisher: Boni & Liveright
- Publication date: 1928
- Media type: Print (hardcover, paperback)

Ryder (1928) is the first novel by Djuna Barnes. A composite of different literary styles, from lyrical poetry to sentimental fiction, it is an example of a modernist novel in the Rabelaisian tradition of bawdy and parodic fiction. Nearly every chapter is written in a different style. The novel is thought to draw on elements of Barnes's own life.

== Synopsis ==
Ryder is an experimental novel and does not follow a linear narrative. The opening chapter, written in the style of the King James Bible, introduces the reader to Jesus Mundane, who is revealed later to be Wendell Ryder. This is followed by a description of the birth of Sophia Grieve Ryder, her marriages and infamy in nineteenth century American, and then the birth of her son, Wendell. Wendell and Sophia visit England, where Wendell meets Amelia, who returns with Wendell to America and marries him. Wendell invites another woman into the family house, a cabin on a farm. This woman, Kate, becomes Wendell's lover and his second (common) wife. Both Amelia and Kate bear Wendell children, and often fight and argue with one another. In one chapter Julie, eldest daughter of Amelia, is implied to have been raped. Doctor Matthew O'Connor (who also appears in Nightwood) is the family doctor. The novel features many digressions, often written in very stylised prose.

== Major Themes ==
One of the novel's central themes is that of sexuality and polygamy. Deborah Parsons describes how the character of Wendell is presented as having an 'idealistic vision of himself as a natural beast with a spiritual purpose to deliver women from the asexual state of virginity'.

== Illustrations ==
The novel is accompanied by Barnes' own illustrations, which feature images of characters and themes from the novel. In Ryder Barnes abandons the Beardsleyesque style of her drawings for The Book of Repulsive Women in favor of a visual vocabulary borrowed from French folk art. Several illustrations are closely based on the engravings and woodcuts collected by Pierre Louis Duchartre and René Saulnier in the 1926 book L'Imagerie Populaire—images that had been copied with variations since medieval times. The bawdiness of Ryder's illustrations led the U.S. Postal Service to refuse to ship it, and several had to be left out of the first edition, including an image in which a giant Sophia is seen urinating into a chamberpot and one in which Amelia and Kate-Careless sit by the fire knitting codpieces. Parts of the text were also expurgated. In an acerbic introduction, Barnes explained that the missing words and passages had been replaced with asterisks so that readers could see the "havoc" wreaked by censorship. A 1990 Dalkey Archive edition restored the missing drawings, but the original text was lost with the destruction of the manuscript in World War II.

== Censorship ==
On publication in 1928, the novel was heavily censored. Barnes writes in her foreword to the novel that since censorship 'has a vogue in America' certain sections of the novel have been 'expurgated' and asterisks have been put in place so as to make it 'matter for no speculation where sense, continuity, and beauty have been damaged'.

In 1979, Barnes declined the opportunity to restore the censored passages for the reissue of the novel by publisher St. Martin's Press.

== Manuscript and Publication History ==
The original manuscript was destroyed during the Second World War and Barnes declined to restore the censored passages for the 1979 reprint. Hence only the censored version exists.

The novel has been reprinted three times since the Second World War. In 1979 by St Martin's Press, and in 1990 and 2024 by the Dalkey Archive Press, which featured an afterword by Paul West.

== Publication history ==
- 1928, USA, Boni & Liveright
- 1979, USA, St Martin's Press
- 1990, UK & USA, Dalkey Archive Press, Paperback
- 2024, UK & USA, Dalkey Archive Press, Paperback
