= Henriette Alice McCrea Metcalf =

American and French translator and collector (1888–1981)

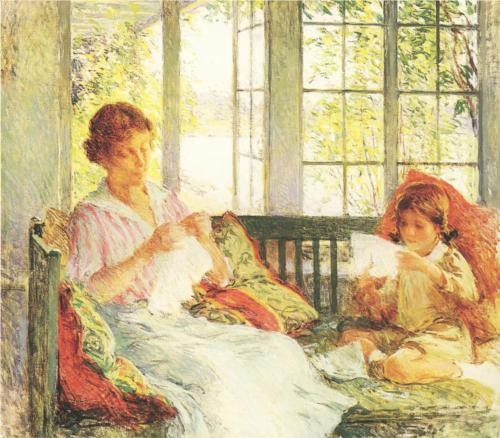
- Willard Metcalf (1917) My Wife and Daughter
- Born: Henrietta Alice McCrea; January 4, 1888; Chicago, Illinois, US
- Died: May 27, 1981 (aged 93); Danbury, Connecticut, US
- Occupation: Translator
- Spouses: Willard Metcalf (m. 1911; div. 1921); Marcus Goodrich (divorced)
- Partner: Thelma Wood 1928–1943
- Children: 2

Henrietta Alice "Henriette" McCrea Metcalf (Note: McCrea often francized her first name as "Henriette". Throughout her life McCrea used the names "Henrietta Alice Metcalf", "Henriette Alice Metcalf", "Henriette McCrea Metcalf", "Henrietta McCrea Metcalf", "Henrietta Metcalf", and "Henriette Metcalf".) (née McCrea; January 4, 1888 – May 27, 1981) was an American and French translator, theatre collector and philanthropist. The partner of Thelma Wood from 1928 to 1943, McCrea inspired the character of "Jenny" in the 1936 book Nightwood by Wood's former partner Djuna Barnes.

== Early life ==
McCrea was born Henrietta Alice McCrea on January 4, 1888 in Chicago to a wealthy Chicagoan family. McCrea's father, Wylie Solon McCrea, was a public utilities executive and the treasurer of Peoples Energy, and her mother, Alice E. McCrea (née Snell), was the daughter of the millionaire Amos J. Snell. The youngest of two siblings, McCrea's mother filed for divorce on charges of cruelty in October 1888.

McCrea subsequently moved to Paris with her mother, and her first language was French. Initially attended a Catholic convent in Paris, and then, when McCrea was 10 years old, after her mother's death, her father took her back to Chicago where she attended other public schools. Later she attended Mlle. Bouligny's School in Chevy Chase, Maryland. By 1906 she had returned to Europe to attend a girls' school. In Paris she became friends with actress Jane Peyton and her husband Guy Bates Post. By the end of 1910 she was back in Chicago, living at 720 Lincoln Park Boulevard.

== Career ==
A fan of theater and actors her collection of autographed photographs and other memorabilia is at the University of Kentucky. She was the dramatic editor for Vanity Fair. Metcalf was a translator from French into English, among her works: Alexandre Dumas' Camille and Anatole France's Our Lady's Juggler. She was a friend of Colette and translated La Dame aux Camélias in 1931 for Eva Le Gallienne and her Civic Repertory Theater.

In 1926 she was the executive secretary of the Education Committee of the Roosevelt Memorial Association for Women. In the 1950s McCrea lived at 86 1/2 Main Street, Newtown. She was member of the Board of Directors for the Planned Parenthood League of Connecticut. In the 1970s McCrea let people farm four acres of her land in a project to have young people work together with their fathers in a rewarding activity.

She was interested in animal welfare and was an activist of Pet Animal Welfare Service (PAWS), Friends of Animals and Humane Society. With other activists she opened "Ye Kit and Kaboodle" at 7 Liberty Street, Bridgeport, CT; the proceedings from the selling of antiques, clothing and paintings, displayed in a colonial-motif, were to go to the care of stray animals in the area.

== Personal life ==
Before her marriage to Willard Metcalf, McCrea was in a sentimental relationship with Ned Sheldon, a leading Broadway's playwright. In 1911, McCrea married the painter Willard Metcalf in Chicago. The couple had two children before divorcing in 1921. By the time of Metcalf's death in 1925, McCrea was married to the screenwriter and novelist Marcus Goodrich. McCrea and Goodrich later divorced. In 1952, Metcalf became the guardian of Jacobus Arnoldus.

On May 27, 1981 McCrea died in Danbury, Connecticut aged 93.

=== Relationship with Thelma Wood ===
McCrea met Thelma Wood in 1928, when the latter was still in a relationship with Djuna Barnes. Wood left Barnes to live with McCrea. In Nightwood by Barnes, modeled the character Jenny Petherbridge on McCrea. The relationship was acknowledged by McCrea's family to the point that her son, Addison Metcalf, included references to Wood in letters to his mother. McCrea and Wood moved first to Greenwich Village and then in 1932 to Florence, where Wood studied art supported by McCrea. In 1934 they moved to Sandy Hook, Connecticut, where Wood launched a gourmet catering service, always supported by McCrea's money. McCrea remained with Wood until 1943 and the relationship ended in a bad way, so much that McCrea rejected the death bed request of Wood to see her.

== Legacy ==
Addison Metcalf founded The Henrietta Alice Metcalf Memorial Scholarship at The American Academy of Dramatic Arts to honor his mother love of the theater.

The Henrietta Alice Metcalf Performing Arts Photographic Collection, dated from 1880 to 1955, is hosted at the University of Kentucky Libraries Special Collections Research Center.
