= Thelma Wood =

American sculptor

- Born: Thelma Ellen Wood; July 3, 1901; Kansas, United States
- Died: December 10, 1970 (aged 69); Danbury, Connecticut, United States
- Known for: Sculpture, drawings

Thelma Ellen Wood (July 3, 1901 – December 10, 1970) was an American artist, specialising in the traditional fine line drawing technique known as Silverpoint. She was noted for her hectic private life, and her lesbian relationship with Djuna Barnes was fictionalized in Barnes' novel Nightwood.

== Early life ==
Wood was born in Mankato, Kansas, the second of four children. Her father later moved the family to St. Louis, Missouri. In 1918 her mother and younger brother succumbed to the influenza epidemic of 1918. Two months prior to their deaths, Wood enrolled at the St. Louis School of Fine Arts (now known as the Sam Fox School of Design & Visual Arts) at Washington University in St. Louis. It is likely there that she learned the technique of silverpoint drawing, for which she is best known. In 1920, Wood and a fellow art student, Myra Marglous, applied for passports and left for Paris to continue studying art.

== Relationships ==
While in Paris, Wood frequented Berlin and was said to have enjoyed excessive alcohol consumption, and being involved in casual sexual relationships. Accounts have described her as "boyish-looking", standing almost 6 feet tall, and "sexually magnetic".

In the fall of 1921, Wood and photographer Berenice Abbott met. They were briefly lovers and remained close friends for life. Abbott later introduced Wood to poet Djuna Barnes, and made photographic portraits of both of them. Wood also had a brief relationship with the poet Edna St. Vincent Millay during the early 1920s.

Wood's relationship with Djuna Barnes lasted 8 years and was deemed the "great love" of each of their lives. From 1921 to 1929 their relationship was fueled by sex and alcohol, and marred by infidelities, jealousy, and violence. Barnes was known for her jealousy with her lovers; Wood was known to be promiscuous with many women. Although Barnes wanted their relationship to be monogamous, Wood regularly sought out casual sexual partners of both sexes. Barnes was also unfaithful.

Wood became involved in an affair with a wealthy woman named Henriette Alice McCrea-Metcalf, leading to the end of her relationship with Barnes. When Wood moved to Greenwich Village in New York City in 1928, Metcalf followed. Wood continued to write and visit Barnes, to whom Wood still professed her love, but Barnes refused to become involved with Wood on a regular basis. By 1932, Wood was more of an unofficial courtesan to Metcalf, and Metcalf supported Wood's art studies in Florence. In 1934, they moved to Sandy Hook, Connecticut. In Westport, Connecticut, Wood began a gourmet catering business that ultimately failed. Her relationship with Metcalf was complicated by Wood continuing to seek out drinking and sexual companions of both sexes, and Wood became increasingly unfaithful.

Nightwood, Barnes' best-known novel, was published in 1936, with the character "Robin Vote" heavily inspired by Wood. Wood was outraged, believing Barnes' portrayal was a misrepresentation, and claimed that the publication of the book ruined her life.

== Career ==
Although very little of her work survives, many of her drawings accompany collections of Djuna Barnes. Wood's sketchbook from a trip to Berlin remains in the Barnes Papers at the University of Maryland, College Park. Her work drew strongly on images from nature. Wood's silverpoint drawings were exhibited at least once, at Milch Galleries in New York City in 1931 where Mary Fanton Roberts reviewed her work favorably.

== Later life ==
Around 1942 or 1943, her relationship with Metcalf had deteriorated to a breaking point due to Wood's unfaithful sexual activities and lack of any gainful employment. Metcalf offered Wood money to move out of their shared house and effectively ended their sixteen-year relationship. Once the separation was complete, Metcalf reportedly never spoke to Wood again, even when Wood, dying, is said to have requested to see her. Wood became involved with Margaret Behrens, a realtor and antique dealer, and she moved into Behrens' home in Monroe, Connecticut. They were together until Wood's death.

== Death ==
Wood died of metastasized breast cancer in Danbury Hospital in 1970. Her ashes were interred in the Behrens family plot in Bridgeport, Connecticut.

== Legacy ==
Author Sarah Schulman dedicated her 2018 novel Maggie Terry, to Thelma Wood. In an interview she stated Wood was, "historically, one of the world’s worst girlfriends who ever lived. She was the bad girlfriend of Djuna Barnes and she drove Djuna Barnes so crazy that she was the muse for Djuna Barnes’s work. So the book is dedicated to bad girlfriends."
