= Djuna Barnes =

American Modernist writer, poet and artist (1892–1982)

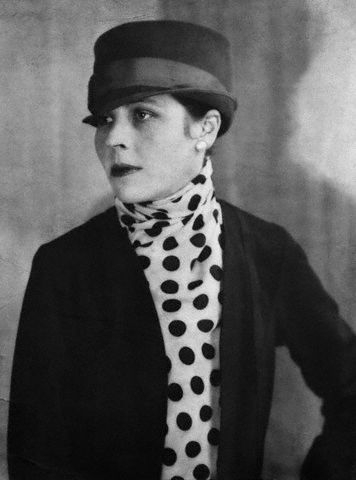
- Barnes, c. 1921
- Born: June 12, 1892; Storm King Mountain, New York, U.S.
- Died: June 18, 1982 (aged 90); New York City, U.S.
- Occupations: Novelist; poet; journalist; artist
- Relatives: Zadel Barnes (paternal grandmother)
- Writing career
- Pen name: Lydia Steptoe; A Lady of Fashion; Gunga Duhl, the Pen Performer
- Notable works: Ladies Almanack (1928); Nightwood (1936)
- Movement: Modernism

Djuna Barnes (/ˈdʒuːnɑː/ JOO-nah; June 12, 1892 – June 18, 1982) was an American artist, illustrator, journalist, and writer who is best known for her novel Nightwood (1936), a cult classic of lesbian fiction and an important work of modernist literature.

In 1913, Barnes began her career as a freelance journalist and illustrator for the Brooklyn Daily Eagle. By early 1914, Barnes was a highly sought feature reporter, interviewer, and illustrator whose work appeared in the city's leading newspapers and periodicals. Later, Barnes's talent and connections with prominent Greenwich Village bohemians afforded her the opportunity to publish her prose, poems, illustrations, and one-act plays in both avant-garde literary journals and popular magazines, and publish an illustrated volume of poetry, The Book of Repulsive Women (1915).

In 1921, a lucrative commission with McCall's took Barnes to Paris, where she lived for the next 10 years. In this period she published A Book (1923), a collection of poetry, plays, and short stories, which was later reissued, with the addition of three stories, as A Night Among the Horses (1929), Ladies Almanack (1928), and Ryder (1928).

During the 1930s, Barnes spent time in England, Paris, New York, and North Africa. It was during this restless time that she wrote and published Nightwood. In October 1939, after nearly two decades living mostly in Europe, Barnes returned to New York. She published her last major work, the verse play The Antiphon, in 1958, and she died in her apartment at Patchin Place, Greenwich Village, in June 1982.

== Life and writing ==
=== Early life (1892–1912) ===
Barnes was born in a log cabin on Storm King Mountain, near Cornwall-on-Hudson, New York. Her paternal grandmother Zadel Barnes was a writer, journalist, and Women's Suffrage activist who had once hosted an influential literary salon. Her father, Wald Barnes (born Henry Aaron Budington), was an unsuccessful composer, musician, and painter. An advocate of polygamy, he married Barnes's mother Elizabeth J. Barnes (née Chappell) in 1889; his mistress Frances "Fanny" Clark moved in with them in 1897, when Barnes was five years old. They had nine children (five from Elizabeth: sons Thurn, Zendon, Saxon and Shangar and daughter Djuna; four from Fanny: sons Duane and Brian and daughters Muriel and Sheila), whom Wald made little effort to support financially. One half-sibling died in childhood. Zadel, who believed her son was a misunderstood artistic genius, struggled to provide for the entire family, supplementing her diminishing income by writing begging letters to friends and acquaintances.

As the second oldest child, Barnes spent much of her childhood helping care for siblings and half-siblings. She received her early education at home, mostly from her father and grandmother, who taught her writing, art, and music but neglected subjects such as math and spelling. She claimed to have had no formal schooling at all; some evidence suggests that she was enrolled in public school for a time after age ten, though her attendance was inconsistent.

It is possible that at the age of 16 she was raped, either by a neighbor with the knowledge and consent of her father, or possibly by her father. However, these are rumors and unconfirmed by Barnes, who never completed her autobiography. What is known is that Barnes and her father continued to write warm letters to each other until his death in 1934. Barnes does refer to a rape obliquely in her first novel Ryder and more directly in her furious final play The Antiphon. Sexually explicit references in correspondence from her grandmother, with whom she shared a bed for years, suggest incest, or overly familiar teasing, but Zadel—dead for 40 years by the time The Antiphon was written—was left out of its indictments. Shortly before her 18th birthday she reluctantly "married" Fanny Clark's brother Percy Faulkner in a private ceremony without benefit of clergy. He was 52. The match had been strongly promoted by her father, grandmother, mother, and brother, but she stayed with him for no more than two months.

=== New York City (1912–1921) ===
In 1912, Barnes's family, facing financial ruin, split up. Elizabeth moved to New York City with Barnes and three of her brothers, then filed for divorce, freeing Wald to marry Fanny Clark. The move gave Barnes an opportunity to study art formally for the first time; she attended the Pratt Institute for about six months from 1912 to 1913 and at the Art Student's League of New York from 1915 to 1916, but the need to support herself and her family—a burden that fell largely on her—soon drove her to leave school and take a job as a reporter at the Brooklyn Daily Eagle. Upon arriving at the Daily Eagle, Barnes declared, "I can draw and write, and you'd be a fool not to hire me", words that were inscribed inside the Brooklyn Museum.

Over the next few years her work appeared in almost every newspaper in New York, including the New York Press, The World and McCall's; she wrote interviews, features, theatre reviews, and a variety of news stories, often illustrating them with her own drawings. She also published short fiction in the New York Morning Telegraph's Sunday supplement and in the pulp magazine All-Story Cavalier Weekly.

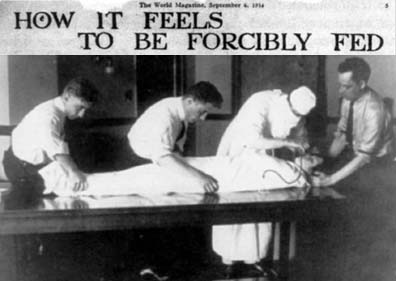
Clipping from World Magazine, September 6, 1914

Much of Barnes's journalism foregrounds the subjective and experiential view. Writing about a conversation with James Joyce, she admitted to missing part of what he said because her attention had wandered, though she revered Joyce's writing. Interviewing the successful playwright Donald Ogden Stewart, she shouted at him for "roll[ing] over and find[ing] yourself famous" while other writers continued to struggle, then said she wouldn't mind dying; as her biographer Phillip Herring points out, this is "a depressing and perhaps unprecedented note on which to end an interview." For "The Girl and the Gorilla", published by New York World Magazine in October 1914 she has a conversation with Dinah, a female gorilla at the Bronx Zoo.

For another article in New York World in 1914, she submitted to force-feeding, a technique then being used on hunger-striking suffragists. Barnes wrote "If I, play acting, felt my being burning with revolt at this brutal usurpation of my own functions, how they who actually suffered the ordeal in its acutest horror must have flamed at the violation of the sanctuaries of their spirits." She concluded "I had shared the greatest experience of the bravest of my sex."

While she mocked conservative suffrage activist Carrie Chapman Catt when Catt admonished would-be suffrage orators never to "hold a militant pose", or wear "a dress that shows your feet in front", Barnes was supportive of progressive suffragists. Barnes suggested that Catt's conservatism was an obstacle to the suffrage movement when Catt tried to ostracize fellow suffragists Alice Paul and Lucy Burns, who sought the vote for women through media attention directed at their strikes and non-violent protesting. It was their mistreatment that motivated Barnes to experience for herself the torture of being force-fed.

Barnes immersed herself in risky situations in order to access experiences that a previous generation of homebound women had been denied. Writing about the traditionally masculine domain of boxing from the ringside, Barnes explored boxing as a window into women's modern identities. In 1914, she first posed the question "What do women want at a fight?" in an article titled "My Sisters and I at a New York Prizefight" published in New York World magazine. According to Irene Gammel, "Barnes' essay effectively begins to unravel an entire cultural history of repression for women". Barnes's interest in boxing continued into 1915 when she interviewed heavyweight champion Jess Willard.

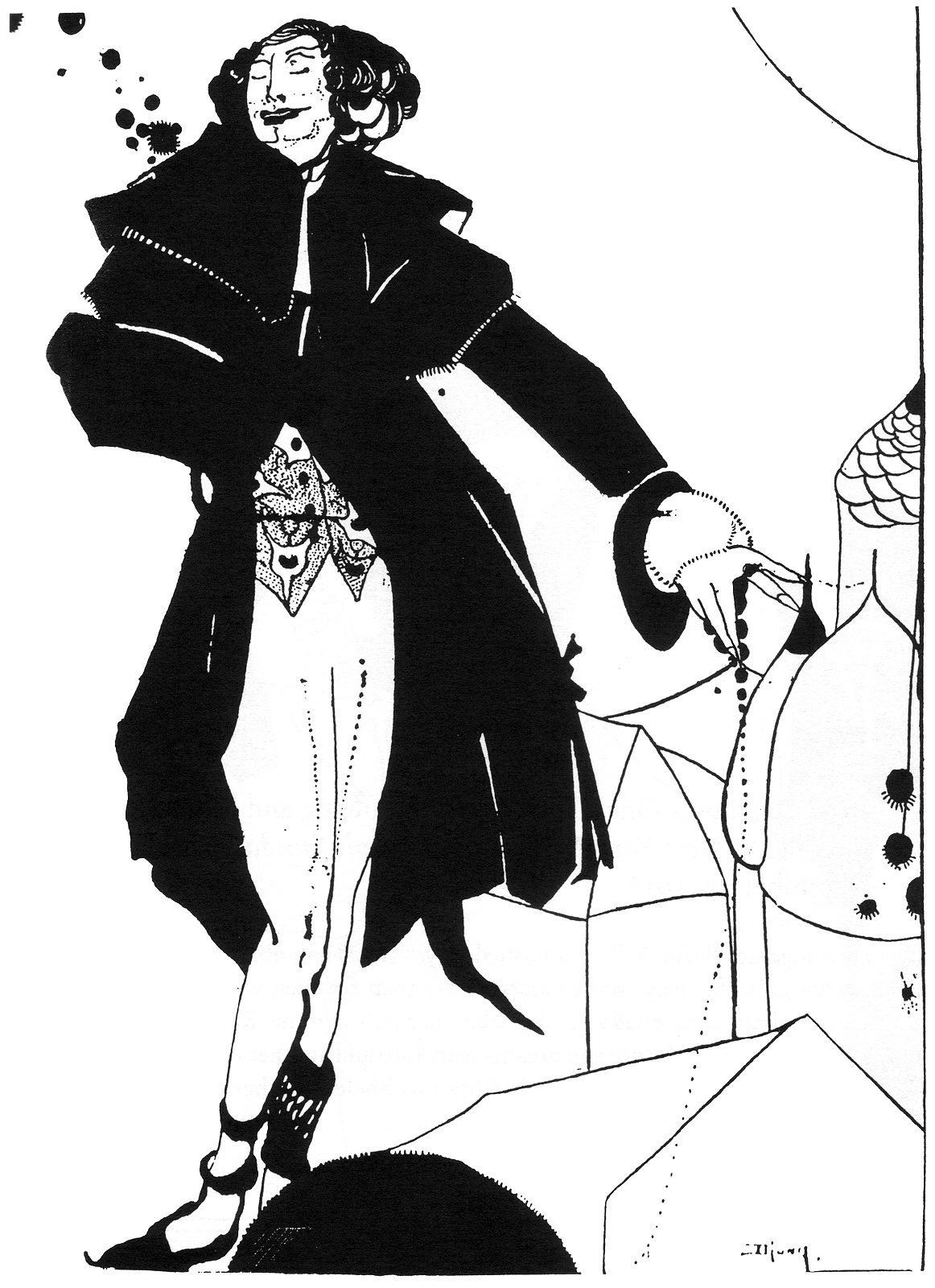
This satirical drawing of a dandyish Greenwich Village resident accompanied Barnes's 1916 article "How the Villagers Amuse Themselves".

In 1915, Barnes moved out of her family's flat to an apartment in Greenwich Village, where she entered a thriving Bohemian community of artists and writers. Among her social circle were Edmund Wilson, Berenice Abbott, and the Dadaist artist and poet Elsa von Freytag-Loringhoven, whose biography Barnes tried to write but never finished. She came into contact with Guido Bruno, an entrepreneur and promoter who published magazines and chapbooks from his garret on Washington Square. Bruno had a reputation for unscrupulousness, and was often accused of exploiting Greenwich Village residents for profit—he used to charge tourists admission to watch Bohemians paint—but he was a strong opponent of censorship and was willing to risk prosecution by publishing Barnes's 1915 collection of "rhythms and drawings"

Despite a description of sex between women in the first poem, the book was never legally challenged; the passage seems explicit now, but at a time when lesbianism was virtually invisible in American culture, the New York Society for the Suppression of Vice may not have understood its imagery. Others were not as naïve, and Bruno was able to cash in on the book's reputation by raising the price from fifteen to fifty cents and pocketing the difference. Twenty years later Barnes used Bruno as one of the models for Felix Volkbein in Nightwood, caricaturing his pretensions to nobility and his habit of bowing down before anyone titled or important.

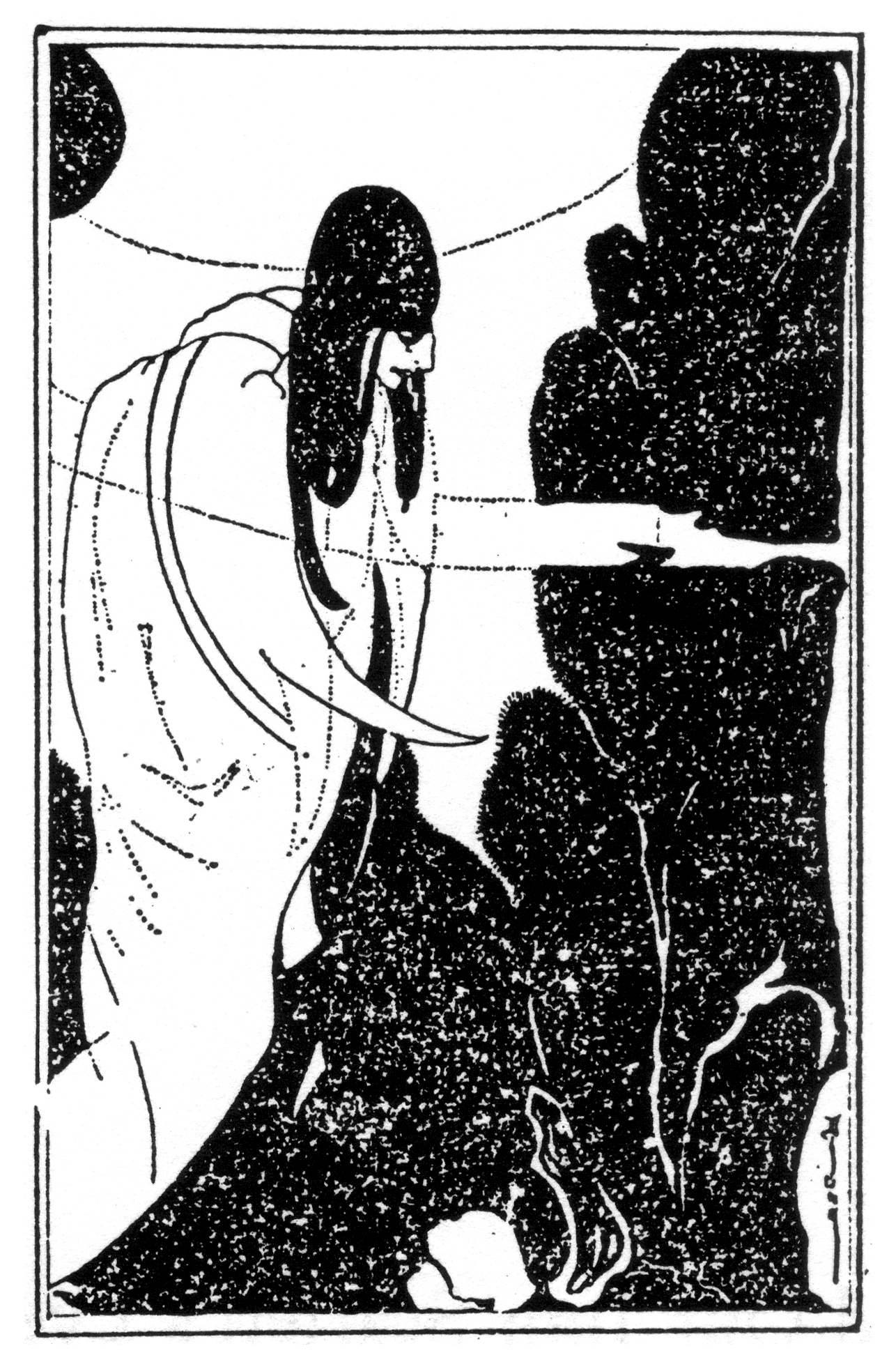
Illustration by Barnes of a scene from J. M. Synge's play The Well of the Saints

Barnes was a member of the Provincetown Players, an amateur theatrical collective whose emphasis on artistic rather than commercial success meshed well with her own values. The Players' Greenwich Village theater was a converted stable with bench seating and a tiny stage; according to Barnes it was "always just about to be given back to the horses." Yet it played a significant role in the development of American drama, featuring works by Susan Glaspell, Edna St. Vincent Millay, Wallace Stevens, and Theodore Dreiser, as well as launching the career of Eugene O'Neill. Three one-act plays by Barnes were produced there in 1919 and 1920; a fourth, The Dove, premiered at Smith College in 1925, and a series of short closet dramas were published in magazines, some under Barnes's pseudonym Lydia Steptoe.

These plays show the strong influence of the Irish playwright J. M. Synge; she was drawn to both the poetic quality of Synge's language and the pessimism of his vision. Critics have found them derivative, particularly those in which she tried to imitate Synge's Irish dialect, and Barnes may have agreed, since in later years she dismissed them as mere juvenilia. Yet in their content, these stylized and enigmatic early plays are more experimental than those of her fellow playwrights at Provincetown. A New York Times review by Alexander Woollcott of her play Three From the Earth called it a demonstration of "how absorbing and essentially dramatic a play can be without the audience ever knowing what, if anything, the author is driving at ... The spectators sit with bated breath listening to each word of a playlet of which the darkly suggested clues leave the mystery unsolved."

Greenwich Village in the 1910s was known for its atmosphere of sexual as well as intellectual freedom. Barnes was unusual among Villagers in having been raised with a philosophy of free love, espoused both by her grandmother and her father. Her father's idiosyncratic vision had included a commitment to unlimited procreation, which she strongly rejected; criticism of childbearing would become a major theme in her work. She did, however, retain sexual freedom as a value. In the 1930s she told Antonia White that "she had no feeling of guilt whatever about sex, about going to bed with any man or woman she wanted"; correspondence indicates that by the time she was 21 her family was well aware of her bisexuality, and she had a number of affairs with both men and women during her Greenwich Village years.

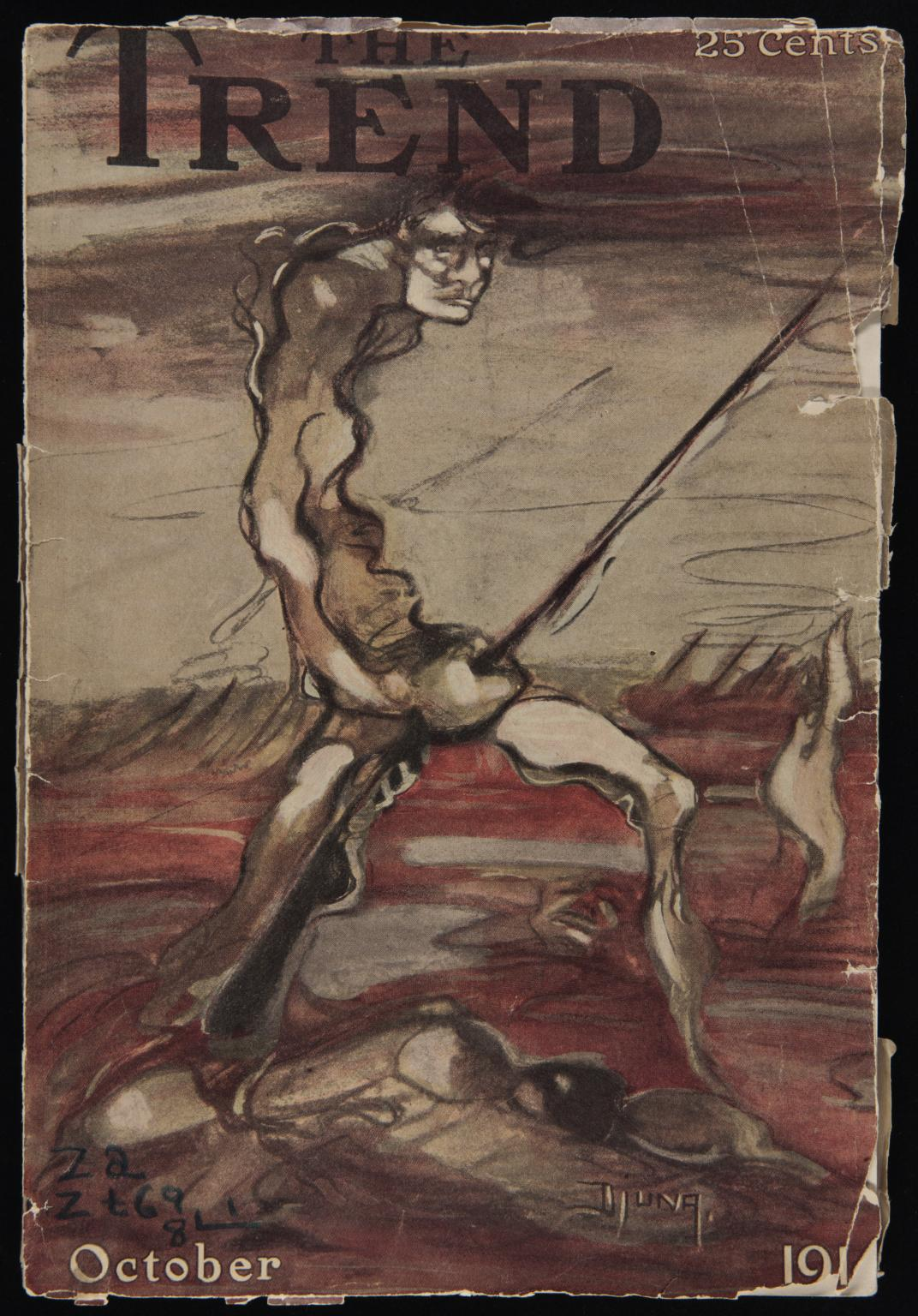
Cover illustration, The Trend, by Djuna Barnes, issue of October 1914

Of these, the most important was probably her engagement to Ernst Hanfstaengl, a Harvard graduate who ran the American branch of his family's art publishing house. Hanfstaengl had once given a piano concert at the White House and was a friend of then-New York State Senator Franklin Delano Roosevelt, but he became increasingly angered by anti-German sentiment in the United States during World War I. In 1916, he told Barnes he wanted a German wife; the painful breakup became the basis of a deleted scene in Nightwood. He later returned to Germany and became a close associate of Adolf Hitler. Starting in 1916 or 1917, she lived with a socialist philosopher and critic named Courtenay Lemon, whom she referred to as her common-law husband, but this too ended, for reasons that are unclear. She also had a passionate romantic relationship with Mary Pyne, a reporter for the New York Press and fellow member of the Provincetown Players. Pyne died of tuberculosis in 1919, attended by Barnes until the end.

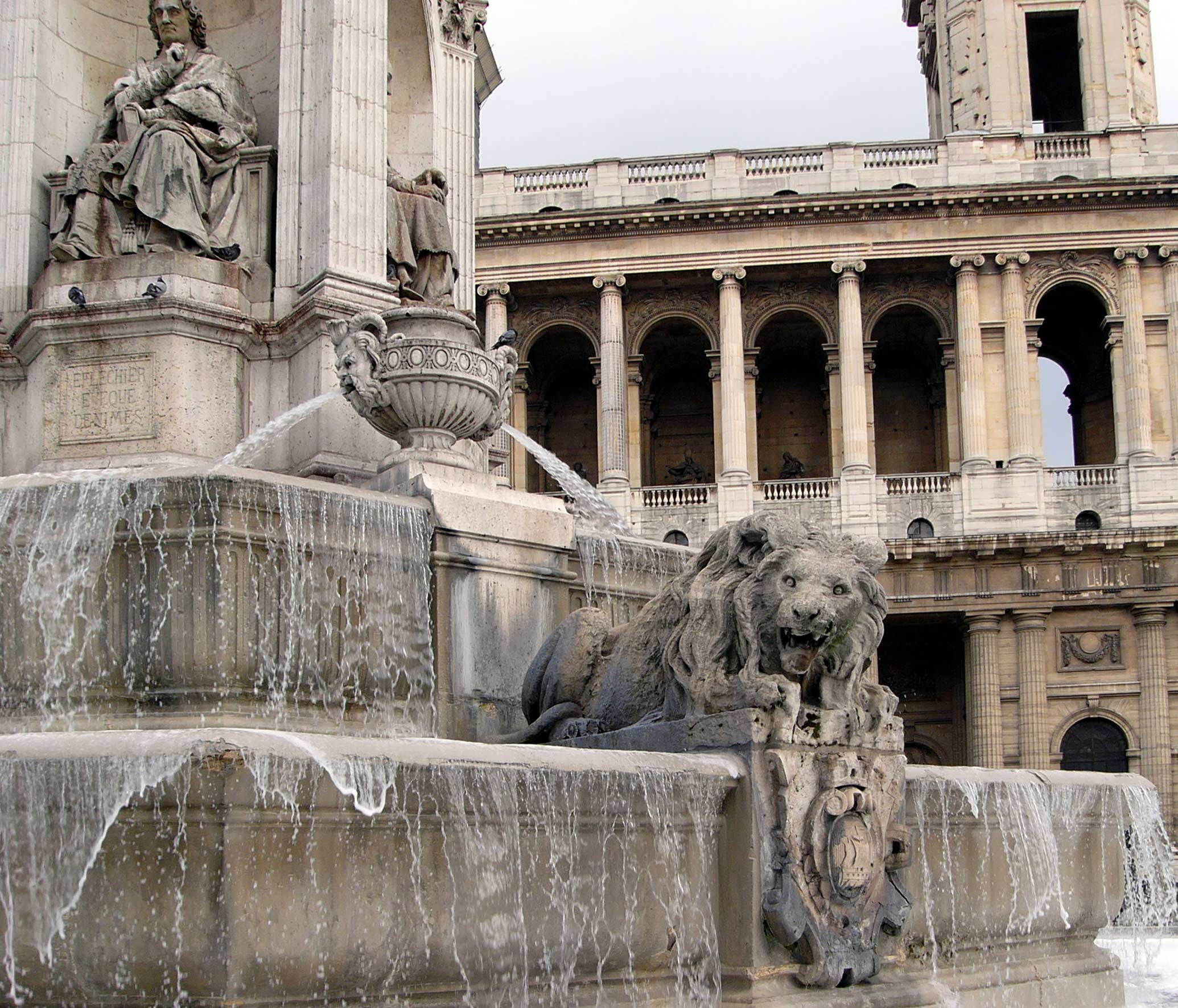
The Fountain of the Four Bishops in Paris's Place Saint-Sulpice, an important location in Nightwood

=== Paris (1921–1930) ===
In the 1920s, Paris was the center of modernism in art and literature. Barnes first traveled there in 1921 on an assignment for McCall's. She interviewed her fellow expatriate writers and artists for U.S. periodicals and soon became a well-known figure on the local scene; her black cloak and her acerbic wit are remembered in many memoirs of the time. Even before her first novel was published, her literary reputation was already high, largely on the strength of her story "A Night Among the Horses", which was published in The Little Review and reprinted in her 1923 collection A Book. She was part of the inner circle of the influential salon hostess Natalie Barney, who became a lifelong friend and patron, as well as the central figure in Barnes's satiric chronicle of Paris lesbian life, Ladies Almanack. The most important relationship of Barnes's Paris years was with the artist Thelma Wood. Wood was a Kansas native who had come to Paris to become a sculptor, but at Barnes's suggestion took up silverpoint instead, producing drawings of animals and plants that one critic compared to Henri Rousseau. By the winter of 1922 they had set up housekeeping together in a flat on the Boulevard Saint-Germain. Another close friendship that developed during this time was with the Dada artist Baroness Elsa von Freytag-Loringhoven, with whom Barnes began an intensive correspondence in 1923. "Where Wood gave Barnes a doll as a gift to represent their symbolic love child, the Baroness proposed an erotic marriage whose love-child would be their book." From Paris, Barnes supported the Baroness in Berlin with money, clothing, and magazines. She also collected the Baroness's poems and letters.

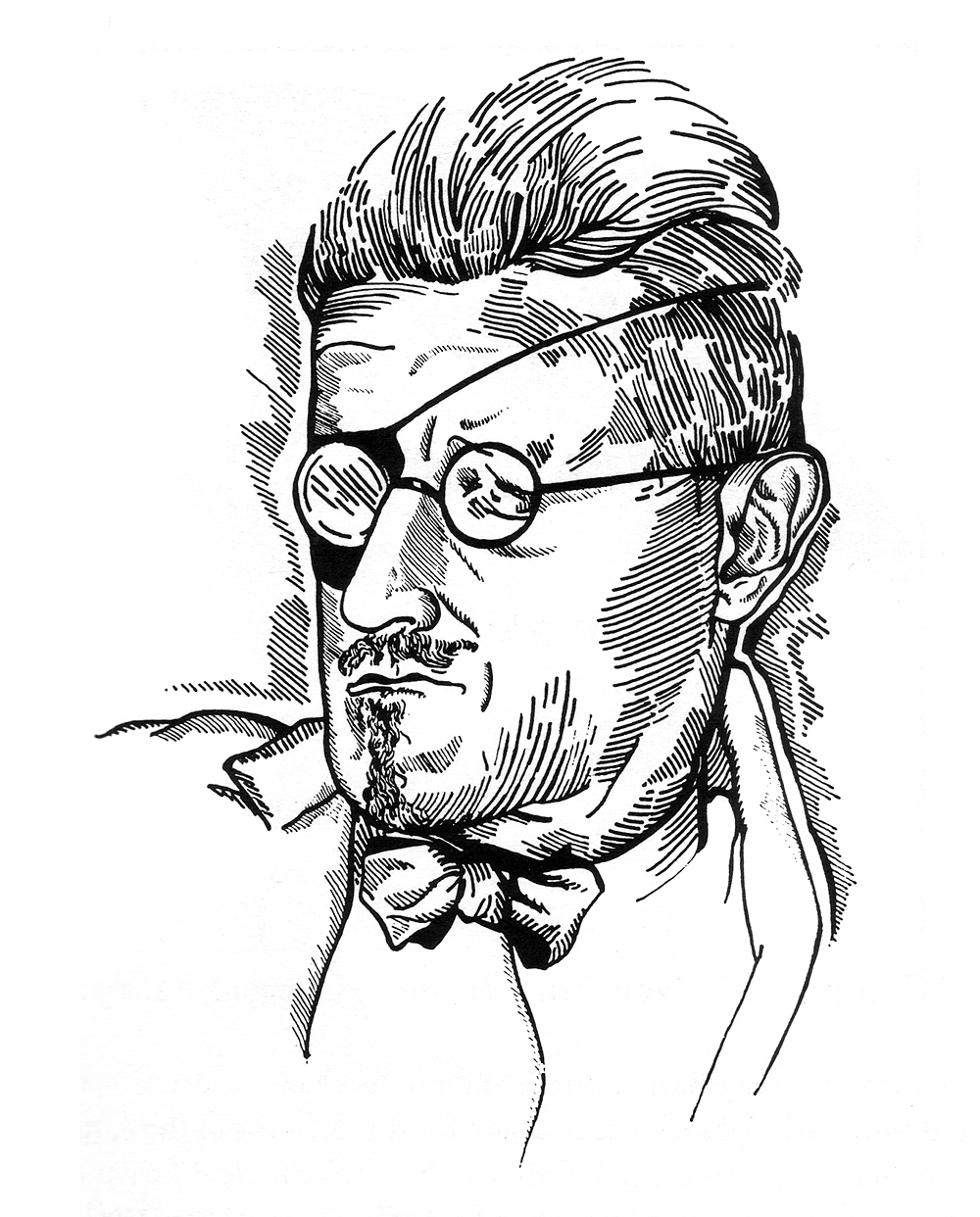
Barnes's drawing of James Joyce illustrated her 1922 interview with him in Vanity Fair.

Barnes arrived in Paris with a letter of introduction to James Joyce, whom she interviewed for Vanity Fair and who became a friend. The headline of her Vanity Fair interview billed him as "the man who is, at present, one of the more significant figures in literature," but her personal reaction to Ulysses was less guarded: "I shall never write another line ... Who has the nerve to after that?" It may have been reading Joyce that led Barnes to turn away from the late 19th century Decadent and Aesthetic influences of The Book of Repulsive Women toward the modernist experimentation of her later work. They differed, however, on the proper subject of literature; Joyce thought writers should focus on commonplace subjects and make them extraordinary, while Barnes was always drawn to the unusual, even the grotesque. Then, too, her own life was an extraordinary subject. Her autobiographical first novel Ryder would not only present readers with the difficulty of deciphering its shifting literary styles—a technique inspired by Ulysses—but also with the challenge of piecing together the history of an unconventional polygamous household, far removed from most readers' expectations and experience.

Despite the difficulties of the text, Ryder's bawdiness drew attention, and it briefly became a New York Times bestseller. Its popularity caught the publisher unprepared; a first edition of 3,000 sold out quickly, but by the time more copies made it into bookstores, public interest in the book had died down. Still, the advance allowed Barnes to buy a new apartment on Rue Saint-Romain, where she lived with Thelma Wood starting in September 1927. The move made them neighbors of Mina Loy, a friend of Barnes's since Greenwich Village days, who appeared in Ladies Almanack as Patience Scalpel, the sole heterosexual character, who "could not understand Women and their Ways."

Due to its subject matter, Ladies Almanack was published in a small, privately printed edition under the pseudonym "A Lady of Fashion". Copies were sold on the streets of Paris by Barnes and her friends, and Barnes managed to smuggle a few into the United States to sell. A bookseller, Edward Titus, offered to carry Ladies Almanack in his store in exchange for being mentioned on the title page, but when he demanded a share of the royalties on the entire print run, Barnes was furious. She later gave the name Titus to the abusive father in The Antiphon.

Barnes dedicated Ryder and Ladies Almanack to Thelma Wood, but the year both books were published—1928—was also the year that she and Wood separated. Barnes had wanted their relationship to be monogamous, but had discovered that Wood wanted her "along with the rest of the world." Wood had a worsening dependency on alcohol, and she spent her nights drinking and seeking out casual sex partners; Barnes would search the cafés for her, often winding up equally drunk. Barnes broke up with Wood over her involvement with heiress Henriette McCrea Metcalf (1888–1981), who would be scathingly portrayed in Nightwood as Jenny Petherbridge.

=== 1930s ===
Much of Nightwood was written during the summers of 1932 and 1933, while Barnes was staying at Hayford Hall, a country manor in Devon rented by the art patron Peggy Guggenheim. Fellow guests included Antonia White, John Ferrar Holms, and the novelist and poet Emily Coleman. Evenings at the manor—nicknamed "Hangover Hall" by its residents—often featured a party game called Truth that encouraged brutal frankness, creating a tense emotional atmosphere. Barnes was afraid to leave her work in progress unattended because the volatile Coleman, having told Barnes one of her secrets, had threatened to burn the manuscript if Barnes revealed it. But once she had read the book, Coleman became its champion. Her critiques of successive drafts led Barnes to make major structural changes, and when publisher after publisher rejected the manuscript, it was Coleman who pressed T. S. Eliot, then an editor at Faber and Faber, to read it.

Faber published the book in 1936. Though reviews treated it as a major work of art, the book did not sell well. Barnes received no advance from Faber and the first royalty statement was for only £43; the U.S. edition published by Harcourt, Brace the following year fared no better. Barnes had published little journalism in the 1930s and was largely dependent on Peggy Guggenheim's financial support. She was constantly ill and drank more and more heavily—according to Guggenheim, she accounted for a bottle of whiskey per day. In February 1939 she checked into a hotel in London and attempted suicide. Guggenheim funded hospital visits and doctors, but finally lost patience and sent her back to New York. There she shared a single room with her mother, who coughed all night and who kept reading her passages from Mary Baker Eddy, having converted to Christian Science. In March 1940, her family sent her to a sanatorium in upstate New York to dry out. Furious, Barnes began to plan a biography of her family, writing to Emily Coleman that "there is no reason any longer why I should feel for them in any way but hate." This idea would eventually come to fruition in her play The Antiphon. After she returned to New York City, she quarreled bitterly with her mother and was thrown out on the street.

=== Return to Greenwich Village (1940–1982) ===
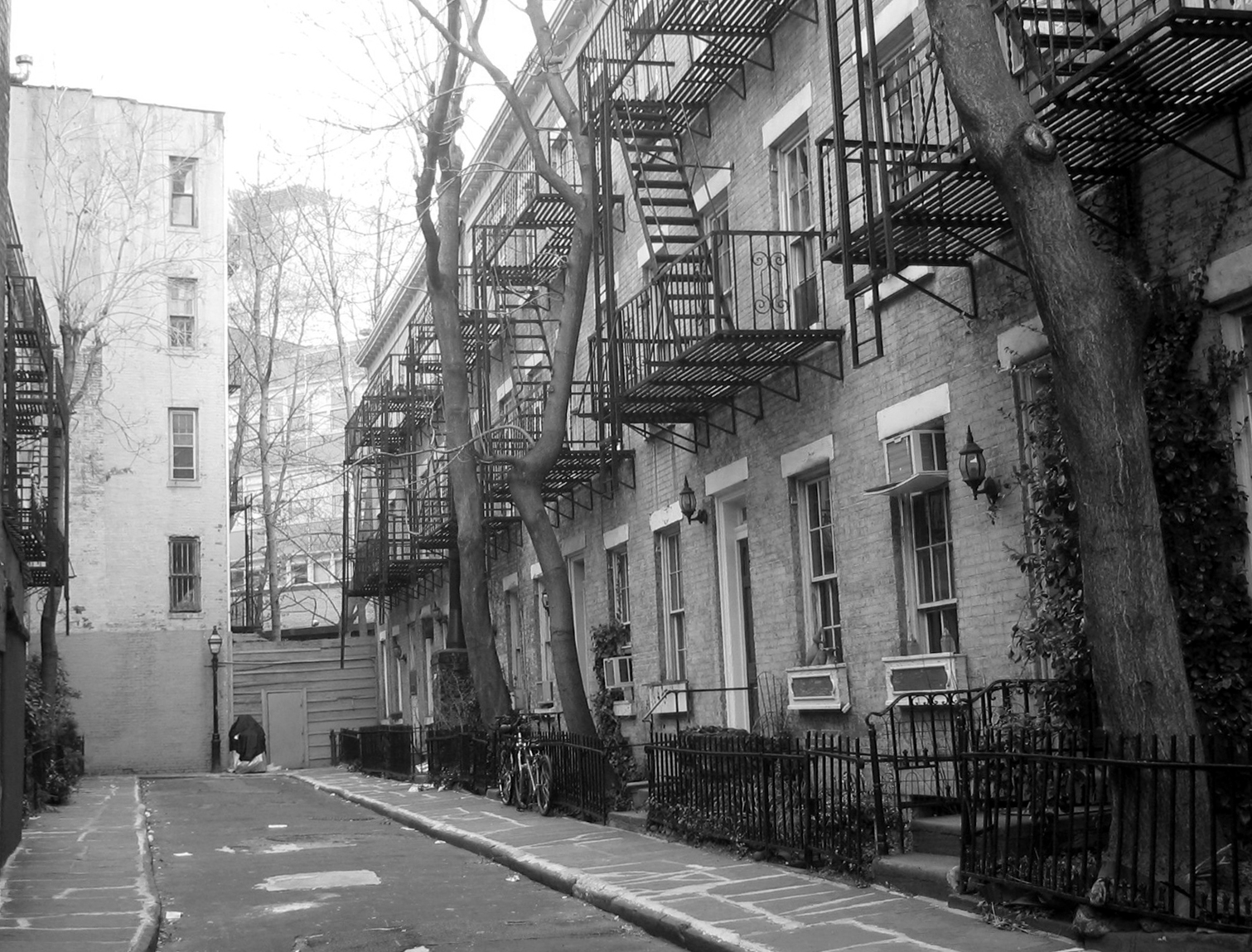
Patchin Place, where Barnes lived for 42 years

Left with nowhere else to go, Barnes stayed at Thelma Wood's apartment while Wood was out of town, then spent two months on a working ranch in Arizona with Emily Coleman and Coleman's lover Jake Scarborough. She returned to New York and, in September, moved into the small apartment at 5 Patchin Place in Greenwich Village where she would spend the last 41 years of her life. Throughout the 1940s, she continued to drink and wrote virtually nothing. Guggenheim, despite misgivings, provided her with a small stipend, and Coleman, who could ill afford it, sent US$20 per month (about $350 in 2025). In 1943, Barnes was included in Peggy Guggenheim's show Exhibition by 31 Women at the Art of This Century gallery in New York. In 1946, she worked for Henry Holt as a manuscript reader, but her reports were invariably caustic, and she was fired.

In 1950, realizing that alcoholism had made it impossible for her to function as an artist, Barnes stopped drinking in order to begin work on her verse play The Antiphon. The play drew heavily on her own family history, and the writing was fueled by anger; she said "I wrote The Antiphon with clenched teeth, and I noted that my handwriting was as savage as a dagger." When he read the play, her brother Thurn accused her of wanting "revenge for something long dead and to be forgotten". Barnes, in the margin of his letter, described her motive as "justice", and next to "dead" she inscribed, "not dead".

After The Antiphon, Barnes returned to writing poetry, which she worked and reworked, producing as many as 500 drafts. She wrote eight hours per day despite a growing list of health problems, including arthritis so severe that she had difficulty even sitting at her typewriter or turning on her desk lamp. Many of these poems never were finalized, and only a few were published in her lifetime.

During her Patchin Place years, Barnes became a notorious recluse, intensely suspicious of anyone she did not know well. E.E. Cummings, who lived across the street, checked on her periodically by shouting out his window "Are you still alive, Djuna?" Bertha Harris put roses in her mailbox, but never succeeded in meeting her; Carson McCullers camped on her doorstep, but Barnes only called down "Whoever is ringing this bell, please go the hell away." Anaïs Nin was an ardent fan of her work, especially Nightwood. She wrote to Barnes several times, inviting her to participate in a journal on women's writing, but received no reply. Barnes remained contemptuous of Nin and would cross the street to avoid her. Barnes was angry that Nin had named a character Djuna, and when the feminist bookstore Djuna Books opened in Greenwich Village, Barnes called to demand that the name be changed. Barnes had a lifelong affection for poet Marianne Moore since she and Moore were young in the 1920s.

Although Barnes had other female lovers, in her later years she was known to claim "I am not a lesbian; I just loved Thelma."

Barnes was elected to the National Institute of Arts and Letters in 1961 and was awarded a senior fellowship by the National Endowment for the Arts in 1981.

Barnes was the last surviving member of the first generation of English-language modernists when she died in her home in New York on June 18, 1982, six days after her 90th birthday.

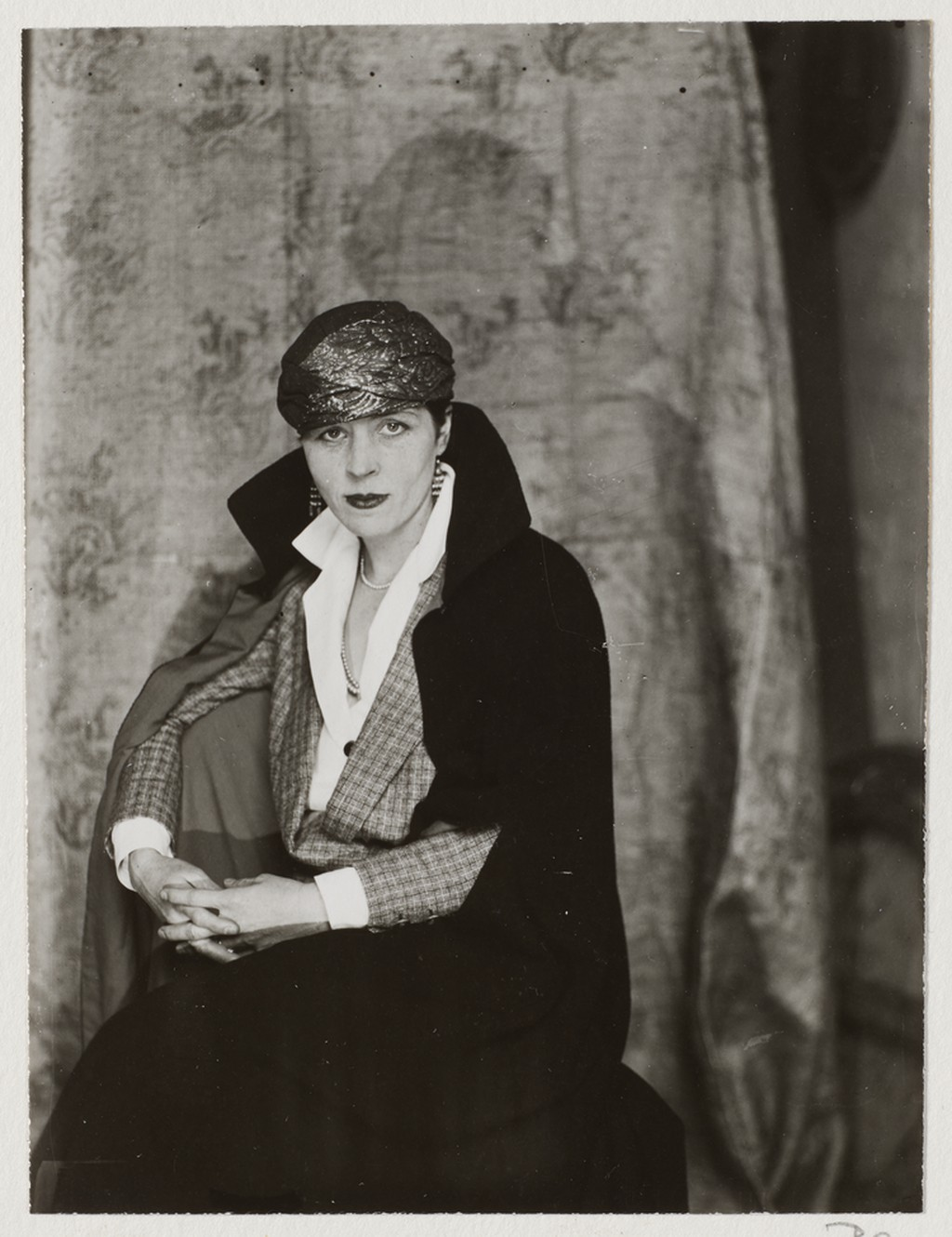
Portrait of Djuna Barnes by Berenice Abbott, 1926

== Works ==
=== The Book of Repulsive Women ===
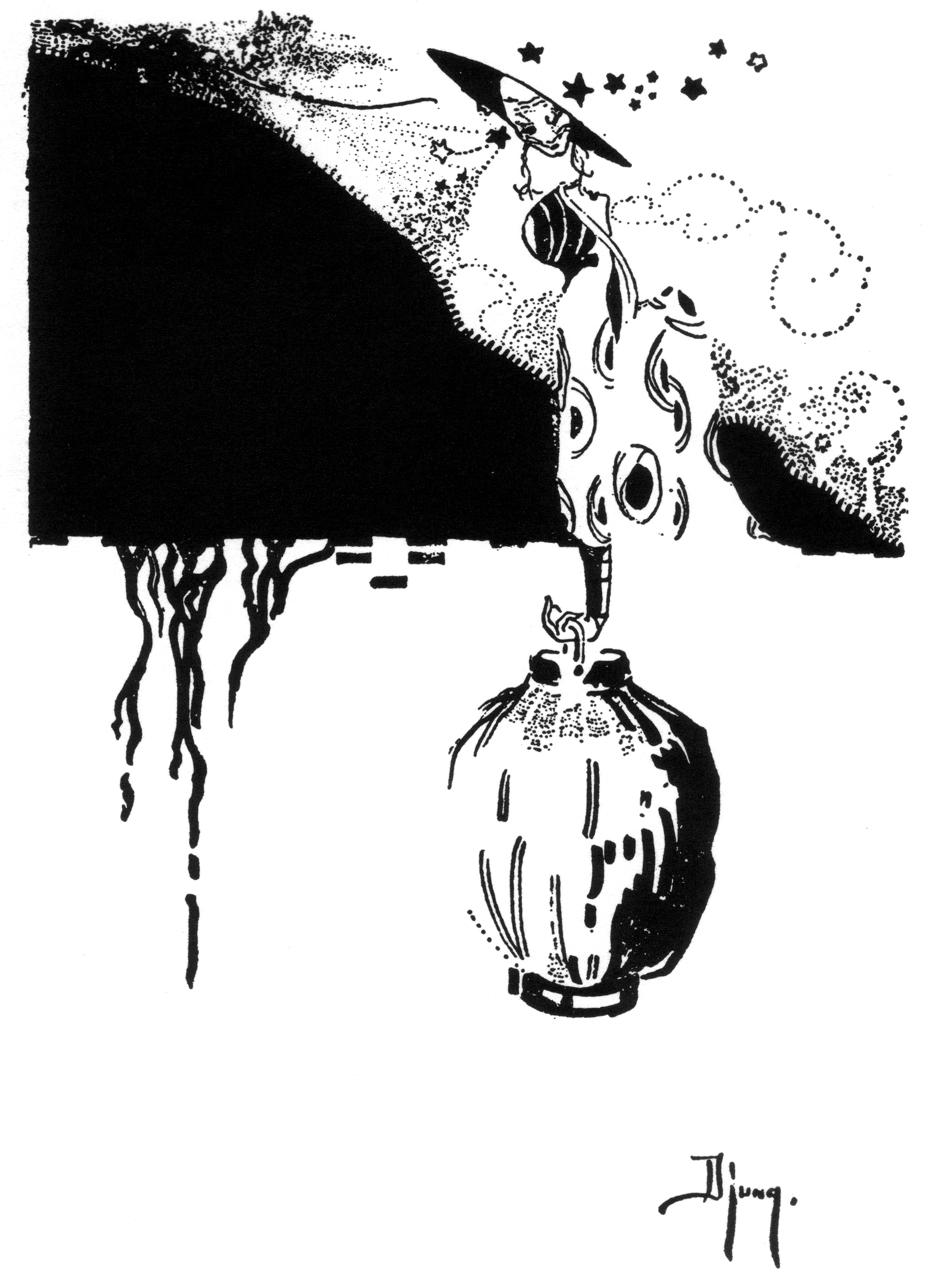
Illustration from The Book of Repulsive Women

Barnes's chapbook The Book of Repulsive Women (1915) collects eight "rhythms" and five drawings. The poems show the strong influence of late 19th century Decadence, and the style of the illustrations resembles Aubrey Beardsley's. The setting is New York City, and the subjects are all women: a cabaret singer, a woman seen through an open window from the elevated train, and, in the last poem, the corpses of two suicides in the morgue. The book describes women's bodies and sexuality in terms that have indeed struck many readers as repulsive, but, as with much of Barnes's work, the author's stance is ambiguous. Some critics read the poems as exposing and satirizing cultural attitudes toward women.

Barnes came to regard The Book of Repulsive Women as an embarrassment; she called the title "idiotic", left it out of her curriculum vitae, and even burned copies. But because the copyright had never been registered, she was unable to prevent it from being republished, and it became one of her most reprinted works.

=== Ryder ===
Barnes's novel Ryder (1928) draws heavily on her childhood experiences in Cornwall-on-Hudson. It covers 50 years of history of the Ryder family: Sophia Grieve Ryder, like Zadel a former salon hostess fallen into poverty; her idle son Wendell; his wife Amelia; his resident mistress Kate-Careless; and their children. Barnes appears as Wendell and Amelia's daughter Julie. The story has a large cast and is told from a variety of points of view; some characters appear as the protagonist of a single chapter only to disappear from the text entirely. Fragments of the Ryder family chronicle are interspersed with children's stories, songs, letters, poems, parables, and dreams. The book changes style from chapter to chapter, parodying writers from Chaucer to Dante Gabriel Rossetti.

Both Ryder and Ladies Almanack abandon the Beardsleyesque style of her drawings for The Book of Repulsive Women in favor of a visual vocabulary borrowed from French folk art. Several illustrations are closely based on the engravings and woodcuts collected by Pierre Louis Duchartre and René Saulnier in the 1926 book L'Imagerie Populaire—images that had been copied with variations since medieval times. The bawdiness of Ryder's illustrations led the U.S. Postal Service to refuse to ship it, and several had to be left out of the first edition, including an image in which Sophia is seen urinating into a chamberpot and one in which Amelia and Kate-Careless sit by the fire knitting codpieces. Parts of the text were also expurgated. In an acerbic introduction, Barnes explained that the missing words and passages had been replaced with asterisks so that readers could see the "havoc" wreaked by censorship. A 1990 Dalkey Archive edition restored the missing drawings, but the original text was lost with the destruction of the manuscript in World War II.

=== Ladies Almanack ===
Cover of Ladies Almanack

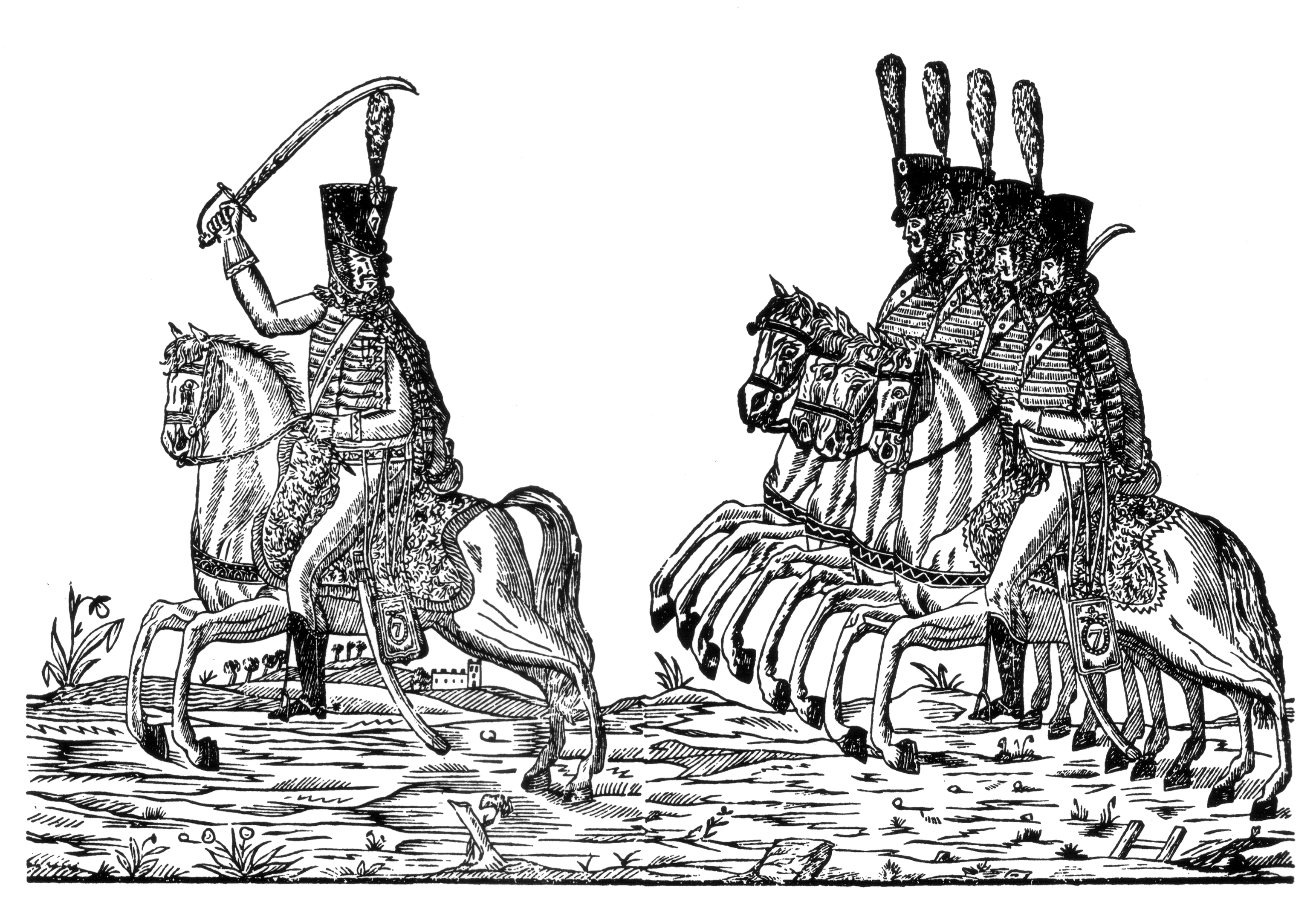
H U S, from L'Imagerie Populaire

Ladies Almanack (1928) is a roman à clef about a predominantly lesbian social circle centering on Natalie Clifford Barney's salon in Paris. It is written in an archaic, Rabelaisian style, with Barnes's own illustrations in the style of Elizabethan woodcuts.

Clifford Barney appears as Dame Evangeline Musset, "who was in her Heart one Grand Red Cross for the Pursuance, the Relief and the Distraction, of such Girls as in their Hinder Parts, and their Fore Parts, and in whatsoever Parts did suffer them most, lament Cruelly." "[A] Pioneer and a Menace" in her youth, Dame Musset has reached "a witty and learned Fifty"; she rescues women in distress, dispenses wisdom, and upon her death is elevated to sainthood. Also appearing pseudonymously are Élisabeth de Gramont, Romaine Brooks, Dolly Wilde, Radclyffe Hall and her partner Una Troubridge, Janet Flanner and Solita Solano, and Mina Loy.

The obscure language, inside jokes, and ambiguity of Ladies Almanack have kept critics arguing about whether it is an affectionate satire or a bitter attack, but Barnes loved the book and reread it throughout her life.

=== Nightwood ===
Barnes's reputation as a writer was made when Nightwood was published in England in 1936 in an expensive edition by Faber and Faber, and in the United States in 1937 by Harcourt, Brace and Company, with an added introduction by T.S. Eliot, Barnes's editor. The avant-garde novel, written under the patronage of Peggy Guggenheim, made Barnes famous in feminist circles.

The novel, set in Paris in the 1920s, revolves around the lives of five characters, two of whom are based on Barnes and Wood, and it reflects the circumstances surrounding the ending of their relationship. In his introduction, Eliot praises Barnes's style, which, while having "prose rhythm ... and the musical pattern which is not that of verse, is so good a novel that only sensibilities trained on poetry can wholly appreciate it."

Due to concerns about censorship, Eliot edited Nightwood to soften some language relating to sexuality and religion. An edition restoring these changes, edited by Cheryl J. Plumb, was published by Dalkey Archive Press in 1995.

Dylan Thomas described Nightwood as "one of the three great prose books ever written by a woman," and William Burroughs called it "one of the great books of the twentieth century." It was number 12 on a list of the top 100 gay books compiled by The Publishing Triangle in 1999.

=== The Antiphon ===
Barnes's verse play The Antiphon (1958) is set in England in 1939. Jeremy Hobbs, in disguise as Jack Blow, has brought his family together at their ruined ancestral home, Burley Hall. His motive is never explicitly stated, but he seems to want to provoke a confrontation among the members of his family and force them to confront the truth about their past. His sister Miranda is a stage actress, now "out of patron and of money"; her materialistic brothers, Elisha and Dudley, see her as a threat to their financial well-being. Elisha and Dudley accuse their mother Augusta of complicity with their abusive father Titus Hobbs. They take advantage of Jeremy's absence to don animal masks and assault both women, making cruel and sexually suggestive remarks; Augusta treats this attack as a game. Jeremy returns with a doll house, a miniature version of the house in America where the children grew up. As she examines it, he charges her with making herself "a madam by submission" because she failed to prevent Titus from orchestrating Miranda's rape by "a travelling Cockney thrice [her] age." The last act finds Miranda and Augusta alone together. Augusta, at once disapproving and envious of her daughter's more liberated life, exchanges clothes with her daughter and wants to pretend she is young again, but Miranda refuses to enter into this play. When Augusta hears Elisha and Dudley driving away, she blames Miranda for their abandonment and beats her to death with a curfew bell, falling dead at her side from the exertion.

The play premiered in 1961 in Stockholm in a Swedish translation by Karl Ragnar Gierow and U.N. Secretary-General Dag Hammarskjöld.

The play was translated into French and set at the Odeon Theater in Paris by the Comédie-Française in March 1990.

=== Creatures in an Alphabet ===
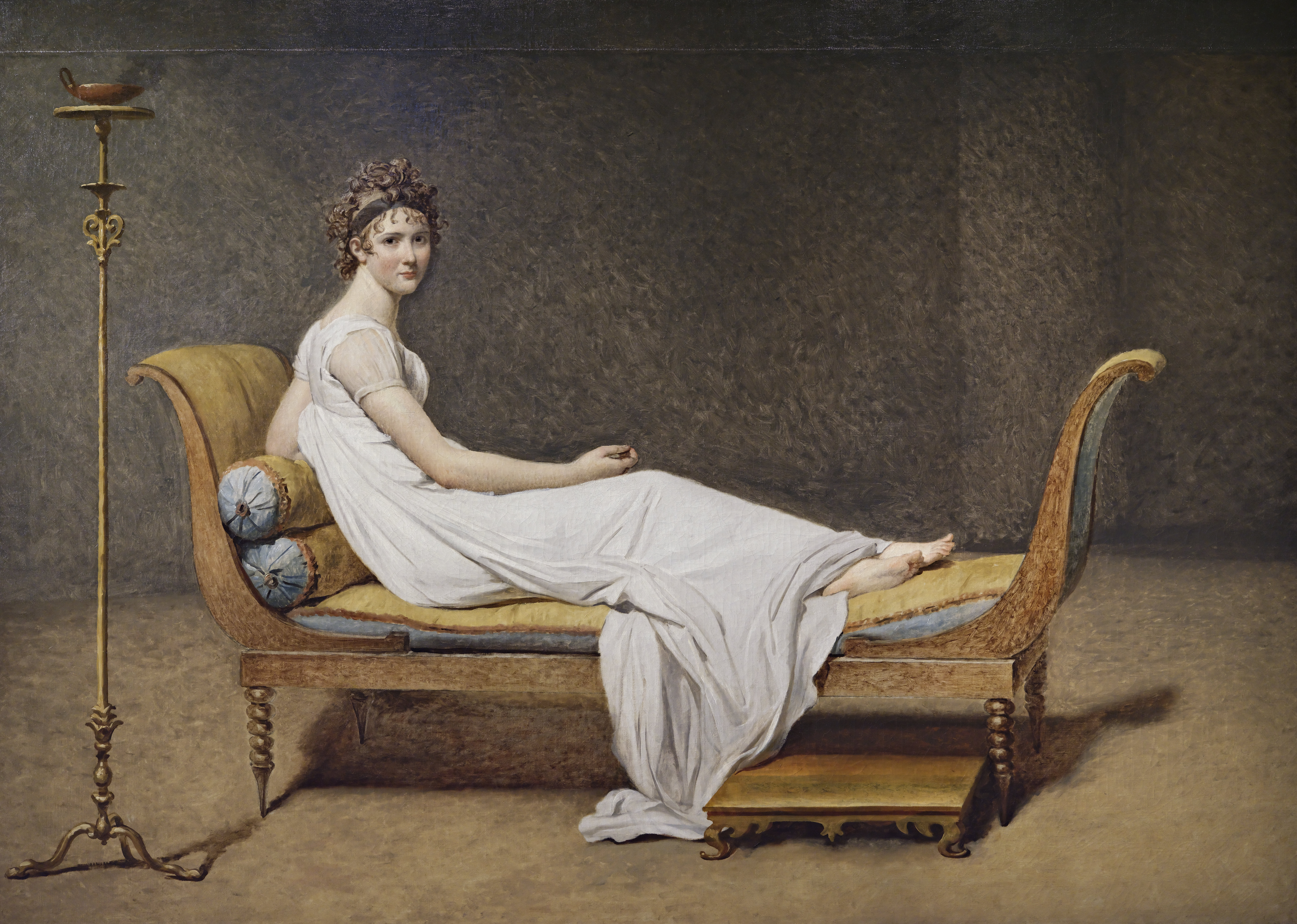
Jacques-Louis David's portrait of Madame Récamier. In Creatures in an Alphabet, Barnes wrote: The Seal, she lounges like a bride, Much too docile, there's no doubt; Madame Récamier, on side, (if such she has), and bottom out.

Barnes's last book, Creatures in an Alphabet (1982), is a collection of short rhyming poems. The format suggests a children's book, but it contains enough allusiveness and advanced vocabulary to make it an unlikely read for a child: the entry for T quotes Blake's "The Tyger", a seal is compared to Jacques-Louis David's portrait of Madame Récamier, and a braying donkey is described as "practicing solfeggio". Creatures continues the themes of nature and culture found in Barnes's earlier work, and their arrangement as a bestiary reflects her longstanding interest in systems for organizing knowledge, such as encyclopedias and almanacs.

=== Unpublished non-fiction ===
During the 1920s and 1930s, Barnes made an effort to write a biography of Elsa von Freytag-Loringhoven and edited her poems for publication. Unsuccessful in finding a publisher for the Baroness's poetry, Barnes abandoned the project. After writing a number of chapter drafts of the biography, she abandoned that project, too, after submitting the first chapter to Emily Coleman in 1939, whose response was not encouraging. Barnes's efforts at writing the biography are detailed in Irene Gammel's Baroness Elsa biography.

== Legacy ==
Barnes has been cited as an influence by writers as diverse as Truman Capote, William Goyen, Karen Blixen, John Hawkes, Bertha Harris, Dylan Thomas, David Foster Wallace, and Anaïs Nin. Writer Bertha Harris described her work as "practically the only available expression of lesbian culture we have in the modern western world" since Sappho.

Barnes's biographical notes and collection of manuscripts have been a major source for scholars who have brought the Baroness Elsa von Freytag-Loringhoven forth from the margins of Dada history. They were key in producing Body Sweats: The Uncensored Writings of Elsa von Freytag-Loringhoven (2011), the first major English collection of the baroness's poems, and a biography titled Baroness Elsa: Gender, Dada and Everyday Modernity (2002).

== Fictional portrayals ==
Cynthia Grant and Svetlana Zylin co-wrote the play Djuna: What of the Night based on Barnes's life and works. The play premiered in 1991.

Emmanuelle Uzan played Barnes in a brief cameo role with no dialogue in Woody Allen's 2011 film Midnight in Paris.

In 2024, a graphic novel biography titled DJUNA: The Extraordinary Life of Djuna Barnes was written by Jon Macy and published by Street Noise Books.

== Bibliography ==
- The Book of Repulsive Women: 8 Rhythms and 5 Drawings. Guido Bruno. 1915.
- A Book (1923) – revised versions published as:
  - A Night Among the Horses (1929)
  - Spillway (1962)
- Ryder (1928)
- Ladies Almanack (1928)
- Nightwood (1936)
- The Antiphon (1958)
- Selected Works (1962) – Spillway, Nightwood, and a revised version of The Antiphon
- Vagaries Malicieux: Two Stories (1974) – unauthorized publication
- Creatures in an Alphabet (1982)
- Smoke and Other Early Stories (1982)
- I Could Never Be Lonely without a Husband: Interviews by Djuna Barnes (1987) – ed. A. Barry
- New York (1989) – journalism
- At the Roots of the Stars: The Short Plays (1995)
- Collected Stories of Djuna Barnes (1996)
- Poe's Mother: Selected Drawings (1996) – ed. and with an introduction by Douglas Messerli
- Collected Poems: With Notes Toward the Memoirs (2005) – ed. Phillip Herring and Osias Stutman
- Vivid and Repulsive as the Truth: The Early Works of Djuna Barnes (2016) - ed. Katharine Maller
- The Lydia Steptoe Stories (2019)
- Biography of Julie von Bartmann (2020) - with an introduction by Douglas Messerli
- I Am Alien to Life: Selected Stories - ed. Merve Emre. New York: McNally Editions (2024)
