= Emily Coleman =

American writer (1899–1974)

- Born: 1899
- Died: 1974 (aged 74–75)
- Occupation: Writer

Emily Holmes Coleman (1899–1974) was an American-born writer and a lifelong compulsive diary keeper. She also wrote a single novel, The Shutter of Snow (1930). This novel, about a woman who spends time in a mental hospital after the birth of her baby, was based on Coleman's own experience of spending time in an insane asylum after contracting puerperal fever and suffering a nervous breakdown.

== Biography ==
Coleman was born in Oakland, California, on January 22, 1899. Graduating from Wellesley College in 1920, she married psychologist Loyd Ring Coleman the next year. In 1926 Coleman and her son John arrived in Paris, where she worked as the society editor for the Paris Tribune, a European edition of the Chicago Tribune. While working for the magazine, she contributed articles, stories, and poems. In the process, she became better acquainted with the magazine's writers. Coleman also worked as a secretary to Emma Goldman for a year, while Goldman was writing her autobiography Living My Life (1931). Coleman continued to live in Europe during the 1930s and 1940s.

In 1940, Coleman married the Arizona rancher Jake Scarborough. The marriage lasted only four years, dissolving following her conversion to Catholicism. From 1944 until her death in 1974, Coleman devoted herself to religious life. At the time of her death, she was being cared for by Catholic nuns at The Farm in Tivoli, New York.

== Writings ==
Coleman's personal papers reveal her to be a prolific writer. However, her only published works were in the form of contributions to minor magazines such as Transition (literary journal) and New Review. Coleman published her only book, The Shutter of Snow in 1930, which fictionalized her experiences as a patient in a mental hospital. Reviewers praised the novel as authentic and vivid.

The diaries Coleman kept as an American expatriate in Paris in the 1920s and 1930s, and in England in the 1940s through the 1960s, are valuable for chronicling her relationships with literary friends such as Djuna Barnes, who wrote much of her novel Nightwood while staying with Coleman and others at Peggy Guggenheim's country manor, Hayford Hall. She also wrote about John Ferrar Holms, Antonia White, Dylan Thomas, Phyllis Jones, George Barker (with whom she had a sexual relationship), Gay Taylor, and a number of others.

But Coleman's diaries and other writings are also psychological revelations of her "passionate," "impatiently earnest" self on an anxious life quest. Coleman was always striving for something in her diaries, for effectiveness as a writer, for a lucid mind, for passion in love, for a seemingly spiritual grace. On her thirty-first birthday in 1930, she reflected on the "conscious effect" of Dante's simple ending to the Inferno and Goethe's words on putting his life in order, comparing her efforts to write and to live with self-control.

Coleman's "spiritual odyssey" led her to the Catholic church. In her "efforts to discover God" she struck up a correspondence and later a personal acquaintance with French philosopher and theologian Jacques Maritain and his wife Raissa. She converted in 1944, and all of her writing afterwards was focused on her Catholic faith, which has been described as "mystical" and "fanatical."

== Diary example ==
May 5, 1947: "But have I given Him my heart? There must be some holding back, or my difficulties with people wouldn't be as they are. Through long habit & also because of native ego (that is --a desire rampant in me from birth to impress & dominate people) I am weak and unconsciously become of the devil's party by thinking of myself instead of Him."
