= Ladies Almanack =

1928 novel

Ladies Almanac
- Author: Djuna Barnes
- Language: English
- Publication date: 1928
- Media type: Print

Ladies Almanack, its complete title being Ladies Almanack: showing their Signs and their Tides; their Moons and their Changes; the Seasons as it is with them; their Eclipses and Equinoxes; as well as a full Record of diurnal and nocturnal Distempers, written & illustrated by a lady of fashion, was written by Djuna Barnes in 1928. This roman à clef catalogues the amorous intrigues of Barnes' lesbian network centered in Natalie Clifford Barney's salon in Paris. Written as a winking pastiche of Restoration wit, the slender volume is illustrated by Barnes's Elizabethan-inspired woodcuts.

Natalie Barney appears as Dame Evangeline Musset, "who was in her Heart one Grand Red Cross for the Pursuance, the Relief and the Distraction, of such Girls as in their Hinder Parts, and their Fore Parts, and in whatsoever Parts did suffer them most, lament Cruelly". "[A] Pioneer and a Menace" in her youth, Dame Musset has reached "a witty and learned Fifty"; she rescues women in distress, dispenses wisdom, and upon her death is elevated to sainthood. Also appearing pseudonymously are Élisabeth de Gramont, Romaine Brooks, Dolly Wilde, Radclyffe Hall and her partner Una, Lady Troubridge, Janet Flanner and Solita Solano, and Mina Loy.

The obscure language, inside jokes and ambiguity of Ladies Almanac have kept critics arguing about whether it is an affectionate satire or a bitter attack, but Barnes herself loved the book and re-read it throughout her life.

== Adaptations and tributes ==
The Ladies Almanack is also an independent feature film (2017) based on the novel by Djuna Barnes and directed by Daviel Shy.

In 2013 the Berlin artist Lena Braun published a novel called "Ladies Almanach" in homage to Djuna Barnes. Braun's Almanach mirrors that of Barnes and updates it by portraying a similar circle of ladies in Berlin in the 1990s.
