= Nightwood =

1936 novel by Djuna Barnes

- Cover of the 2006 edition
- Author: Djuna Barnes
- Cover artist: Sigrid Rothe
- Language: English
- Genre: Modernist; Lesbian literature
- Publisher: Faber and Faber (UK); Harcourt, Brace and Company (US)
- Publication date: 1936 (UK); 1937 (US)
- Publication place: London, England, United Kingdom; New York City, New York, United States
- Media type: Print (hardback & paperback)
- Pages: 180
- ISBN: 978-0-8112-1671-5 (New Directions Publishing Paperback Reprint)
- OCLC: 1713097
- Dewey Decimal: 813/.52 22
- LC Class: PS3503.A614 N5 2006
- Preceded by: Ladies Almanack
- Followed by: The Antiphon

Nightwood is a 1936 novel by American author Djuna Barnes that was first published in the United Kingdom by publishing house Faber and Faber. It is one of the early prominent novels to portray explicit homosexuality between women, and as such can be considered lesbian literature.

It is also notable for its intense, gothic prose style. The novel employs modernist techniques such as its unusual form or narrative and can be considered metafiction, and it was praised by other modernist authors including T. S. Eliot, who edited the novel, helped publish it, and wrote an introduction included in the 1937 edition published by Harcourt, Brace. As a roman à clef, the novel features a thinly veiled portrait of Barnes in the character of Nora Flood, whereas Nora's lover Robin Vote is a composite of Thelma Wood and the Baroness Elsa von Freytag-Loringhoven, Jenny Petherbridge is Henriette Alice McCrea-Metcalf, and Felix Volkbein is derived from Frederick Philip Grove.

== Synopsis ==
=== Bow Down ===
Felix Volkbein is born in early 1880 to Guido and Hedvig Volkbein. Guido had died before the birth and Hedvig shortly thereafter. Guido had pretended to be of noble descent and shirks from his Jewish origins. Thirty years later, Felix turns up from nowhere with the paintings of Guido's "parents", which bear an accidental resemblance to the man. His aunt informs him of his presumed heritage, and Felix takes it up readily. He comes by good money, masters seven languages, and though well-known, is unpopular.

In 1920, Felix lives in Paris, socializing with performers, one of whom is Frau Mann, a trapeze artist. One night in Berlin, Mann intends to introduce Felix to a Count Onatorio Altamonte, but they walk in on Dr. Matthew O'Connor, an Irishman from San Francisco. They speak on a litany of subjects, among them religion, marks and stories; much of the speaking is done by Matthew. A young woman comes over; she is Nora Flood.

=== La Somnambule ===
A few weeks after the Berlin encounter, Matthew brings Felix to a café. An employee from a local hotel approaches the doctor regarding a lady who has fainted. They go upstairs to a room full of a variety of plants surrounding a bed, upon which lies a young woman.

The woman is disheveled and of abnormal appearance. Felix retreats for propriety and Matthew, who happens to be an unlicensed doctor, rouses the woman, whose name is Robin Vote. Felix then sees Matthew embellish his face with perfume, powder, and rouge.

Felix calls for the next four days on Robin to find that she is not in her room. On the fifth, he runs into her on the street, and they walk towards the Jardin du Luxembourg, Felix talking about himself, Robin silent. They spend much time in museums in the days following, and Felix is surprised to learn that Robin has a taste not just for the excellent but also for the debased and decadent. He falls for her and she agrees to marry him.

Robin becomes pregnant and takes to wandering to other cities alone for long lengths of time. Eventually, Robin gives birth to a boy. One night, they have a confrontation about how Robin did not want their son, and Robin leaves Paris for a few months, reappearing later with Nora Flood, and unwilling to explain what she has been up to. Matthew says that she has been in America.

=== Night Watch ===
Nora Flood is introduced as a native of western America. In the fall of 1923, she meets Robin at a circus in New York. They begin a relationship then, living together then traveling across Europe to Paris, where Nora buys an apartment on the rue du Cherche-Midi. Nora begins to dream of Robin in danger and of taking Robin's body down into the earth with her. SHE comes to the conclusion that the only way to keep Robin for herself is through death. They stay together for years, and as time goes on, Robin's leaves her more often. At first, Nora goes with Robin, but later stays home, where she goes out where she might not see Robin.

One night, Nora dreams herself in her grandmother's room. Looking down, she sees Robin lying on the floor far below, and calls to her, but the louder she calls, the farther away the floor goes. She remembers happening upon her cross-dressed grandmother as a child, which now indicates to Nora some sort of disfigurement and eternalization of Robin. Nora wakes sees that Robin is with another woman in the garden.

=== "The Squatter" ===
The other woman is Jenny Petherbridge, a middle-aged widow married four times. She and Robin later run into Matthew at the opera; while leaving, their conversation grows heated. Jenny strikes Robin repeatedly, drawing blood. Shortly afterwards, Nora and Robin separate; after that, Robin and Jenny leave for America.

=== Watchman, What of the Night? ===
Nora seeks Matthew in his apartment to talk about the night. He is rouged, in a women's nightgown, and otherwise made up; upon realizing Nora’s presence, the doctor takes off his wig and hides most of himself under the sheets.

The doctor rants about life for a bit, then discusses cultural separations of nights from days. He then implies that Robin and Nora will be bound forever. He states that Jenny, Robin, and Nora will be entangled forever.

=== Where the Tree Falls ===
Felix's son Guido is deficient, clumsy, and wishes to enter the church. Felix and Matthew meet; Matthew says that Guido is really what Felix has been looking for.

=== Go Down, Matthew ===
Matthew comes into Nora's apartment late one afternoon to find her writing a letter. Nora is anxious; they proceed to talk at each other for a long time.

Matthew speaks of Jenny and the self-destructive effects of Nora's idolization of Robin. Nora remains adamant that she must continue writing to Robin. Realizing her conflation of identity with Robin's, Nora grows despondent. Matthew says that she has erred in attempting to know the unknowable Robin. They talk more of Robin, sexuality, gender identity, and unhealthy love.

After Robin had left with Jenny for America, Nora, through soul-searching realized that that was all she had been to Robin—a dismay. Matthew leaves for his usual café, where, drunk, he complains about Nora, Jenny, Felix, and his own sad state.

=== The Possessed ===
The book circles back to when Robin and Jenny left for America. When they arrived in New York together, Robin seemed distracted, wandering about the country, entering many churches. Jenny follows close behind, noticing Robin's approaches to animalism.

Now, Robin begins to circle closer to Nora's country—the west—sleeping in the woods, until she reaches the chapel on Nora's grounds, where she brings some of her things. She goes no further, and one night she wakes up to hear Nora's dog barking.

Nora, having since returned, lets out the dog, and follows him until she sees the chapel, when she begins to run to it.

Inside, Robin stands before a contrived altar, and when Nora hits the jamb, she goes down before the dog, dragging her knees and swinging her head against the dog's. The dog, frightened, tries to escape, but is cornered. He grows more and more agitated, biting at Robin, and then Robin begins to bark too, to which the dog cries, and their affects decrease in intensity until Robin lies out, weeping, and the dog too lies down, head on Robin's knees.

== Conception ==
Barnes worked on Nightwood, then known as Bow Down, in the summer of 1932, while at Peggy Guggenheim's country manor, Hayford Hall, in Devonshire. Author Charles Henri Ford also typed part of an early version of the manuscript for Barnes while she was in Tangiers with him in 1932. Emily Coleman heard Barnes read portions of the draft at Hayford Hall that summer and became deeply involved in helping Barnes make major revisions to the manuscript in 1934–1935, as she struggled to find a publisher. In 1935–1936, Coleman persistently contacted T. S. Eliot, then an editor at Faber and Faber, to get his support to publish the novel. It was published later in 1936, after Barnes and Coleman accepted Eliot's further suggested revisions.

== Reception and critical analysis ==
Roger Austen notes that "the best known, most deeply felt, and generally best written expatriate novel of the 1930s dealing with gay themes was Djuna Barnes' Nightwood". Austen goes on to advance the notion that Barnes's depiction of Dr. O'Connor probably confounded a number of American readers because he was neither a "scamp or a monster" nor does he pay a "suitable penalty" for leading a "life of depravity".

Because of concerns about censorship, Eliot edited Nightwood to soften some language relating to sexuality and religion. An edition restoring these changes, edited by Cheryl J. Plumb, was published by Dalkey Archive Press in 1995. Catherine Hollis also argues that Barnes originally intended that the chapter "Night Watch" should be immediately followed by "Watchman, What of the Night?", and then "The Squatter".

Dylan Thomas described Nightwood as "one of the three great prose books ever written by a woman", while William S. Burroughs called it "one of the great books of the twentieth century". It was number 12 on a list of the top 100 gay and lesbian novels compiled by The Publishing Triangle in 1999.

Anthony Slide, a modern scholar, lists Nightwood as an example of one of the best-known gay novels of the first half of the 20th century in the English language, alongside Gore Vidal's The City and the Pillar, Carson McCullers' Reflections in a Golden Eye, and Truman Capote's Other Voices, Other Rooms.

== Works cited ==
- Austen, Roger (1977). Playing the Game: The Homosexual Novel in America (1st ed.). Indianapolis: The Bobbs-Merrill Company. ISBN 978-0-672-52287-1.
- Gammel, Irene (2002). Gender, Dada and Everyday Modernity: A Cultural Biography. Cambridge, Massachusetts: MIT Press. ISBN 978-0-262-07231-1.
- Slide, Anthony (2003). Lost Gay Novels: A Reference Guide to Fifty Works from the First Half of the Twentieth Century (1st ed.). Binghamton, New York: Harrington Park Press. ISBN 978-1-56023-413-5.
- Young, Ian (1975). The Male Homosexual in Literature: A Bibliography (1st ed.). Metuchen, New Jersey: The Scarecrow Press. ISBN 978-0-8108-0861-4.
