= Ernest J. Wilson III =

American scholar (born c. 1948)

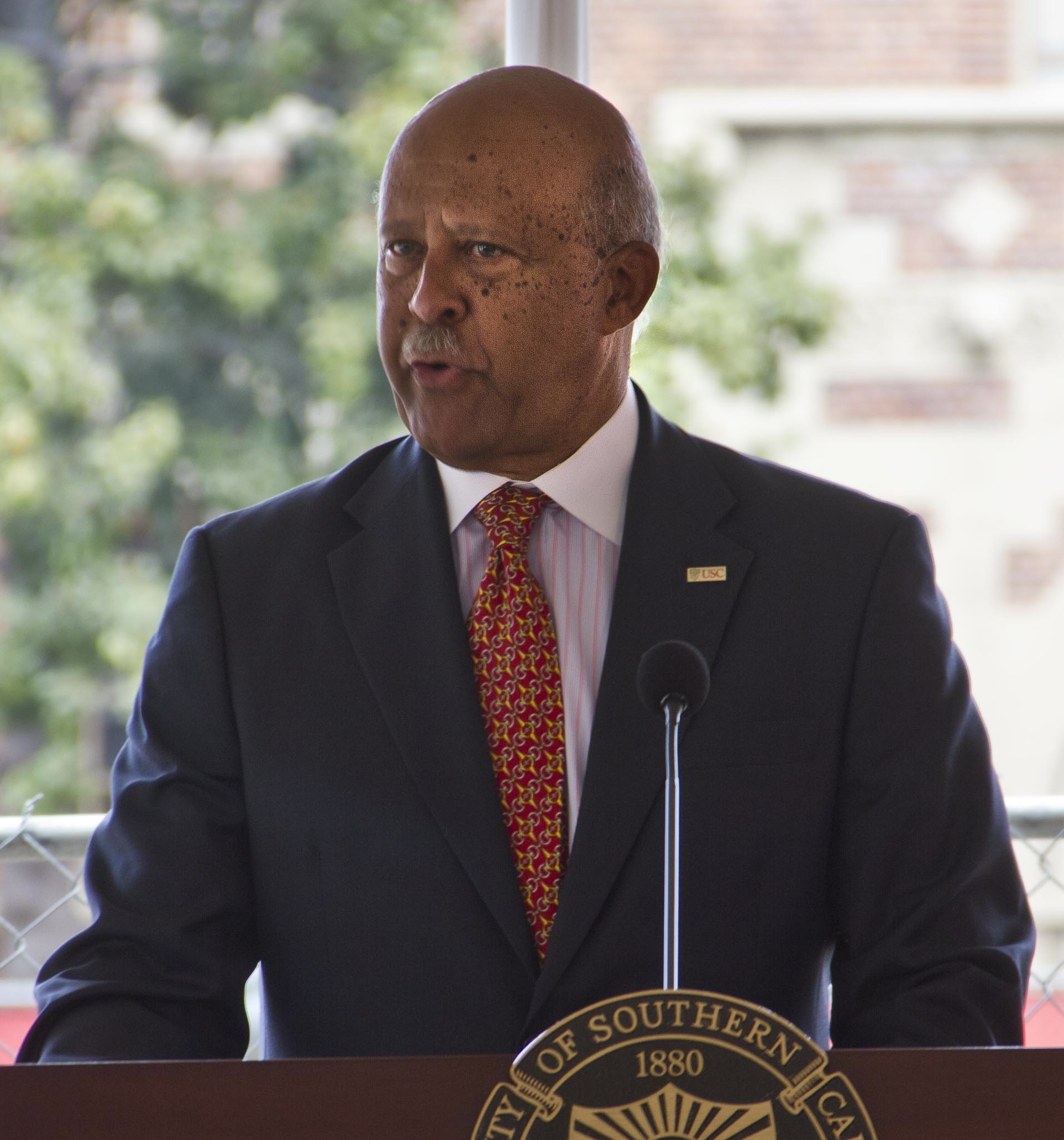
Wilson in 2012

Ernest James Wilson III (born c. 1948) is an American scholar. Wilson was the Walter Annenberg Chair in Communication, and Dean of the Annenberg School for Communication (USC Annenberg) at the University of Southern California (USC), Los Angeles, California from 2007 to 2017. He stepped down as dean in June 2017 and was succeeded by Willow Bay. Dr. Wilson is the founder of USC Annenberg's Center for Third Space Thinking, which is devoted to research, teaching and executive education on soft skills in the digital age. Through the center, Dr. Wilson's most recent research focuses on critical workforce competencies and talent and skills development in the 21st century. As a fellow at the Center for Advanced Study in the Behavioral Sciences at Stanford University, he currently is writing a book on utilizing competencies via the framework of Third Space Thinking.

== Early life and education ==
Originally from Washington, D.C., Wilson obtained a B.A. from Harvard College in Cambridge, Massachusetts, in 1970. He obtained a MA from the University of California, Berkeley (UC Berkeley) in 1973 and a Ph.D. in 1978.

== Career ==
Wilson began his academic career at University of Michigan in Ann Arbor, Michigan and the University of Pennsylvania in Philadelphia. At Michigan, he was director of the Center for Research on Economic Development and an associate research scientist at the Institute for Public Policy Studies.

In 1992, he joined the University of Maryland, College Park, where he was a professor and senior research scholar, holding a joint appointment in the Department of Government and Politics and in the Department of African-American Studies. From 1995 to 2002, Wilson was director of the Center for International Development and Conflict Management at the university, and he remains a senior fellow of the center today.

In 2002, he received an appointment to USC Annenberg, where he is also a senior fellow at the USC Center on Public Diplomacy, a joint project of USC Annenberg and the USC College's School of International Relations, and an adjunct fellow at the Pacific Council on International Policy.

From 1993 to 1994, he was director of international programs and resources on the White House National Security Council. In 1994, he was the director of the Policy and Planning Unit, Office of the Director, U.S. Information Agency, and from 1994 to 1995, he was the deputy director of the Global Information Infrastructure Commission.

In 2010, he was appointed to the editorial advisory board of Demand Media, a U.S. Internet company that focuses on generating large amounts of low-cost content that is highly search engine optimized, and is often described as a content farm. In 2017, he joined the board of The Conversation US, a non-profit news site.

He is the recipient of several research fellowships and awards, including an international affairs fellowship from the Council on Foreign Relations and a post-doctoral fellowship from Harvard Kennedy School at Harvard University.

== Personal life ==
He is married to Francille Rusan Wilson, a labor and intellectual historian, and they have two sons.

== Work ==
Wilson's scholarship focuses on the convergence of communication and information technology, public policy, and the public interest. He is a student of the “information champions,” the leaders of the information revolution around the world. His current work concentrates on China-Africa relations, global sustainable innovation in high-technology industries, and the role of politics in the diffusion of information and communication technologies.

=== Books ===
Wilson has published two books, The Information Revolution in Developing Countries and Negotiating the Net in Africa.

He co-edits the MIT Press series, The Information Revolution and Global Politics, and is a founding editor of the journal entitled, Information Technologies and International Development.

=== CPB ===
Nominated by President Bill Clinton, Wilson served on the board of directors of the Corporation for Public Broadcasting from 2000 to 2010, and as chairman in the last year. He was reappointed to the CPB board by President George W. Bush in 2004.

== Selected publications ==
- Rodriguez, Francisco, and Ernest J. Wilson III. Are poor countries losing the information revolution?. (2000).
- Wilson, Ernest J. The information revolution and developing countries. MIT Press, 2004.

Articles, a selection:

- Patterson, Rubin, and Ernest J. Wilson III. "New IT and Social Inequality: Resetting the Research and Policy Agenda." The Information Society 16.1 (2000): 77–86.
- Wilson Iii, Ernest J., and Kelvin Wong. "African Information Revolution: A Balance Sheet." Telecommunications Policy 27.1 (2003): 155–177.
