= Jerrold D. Green =

Dr. Jerrold D. Green
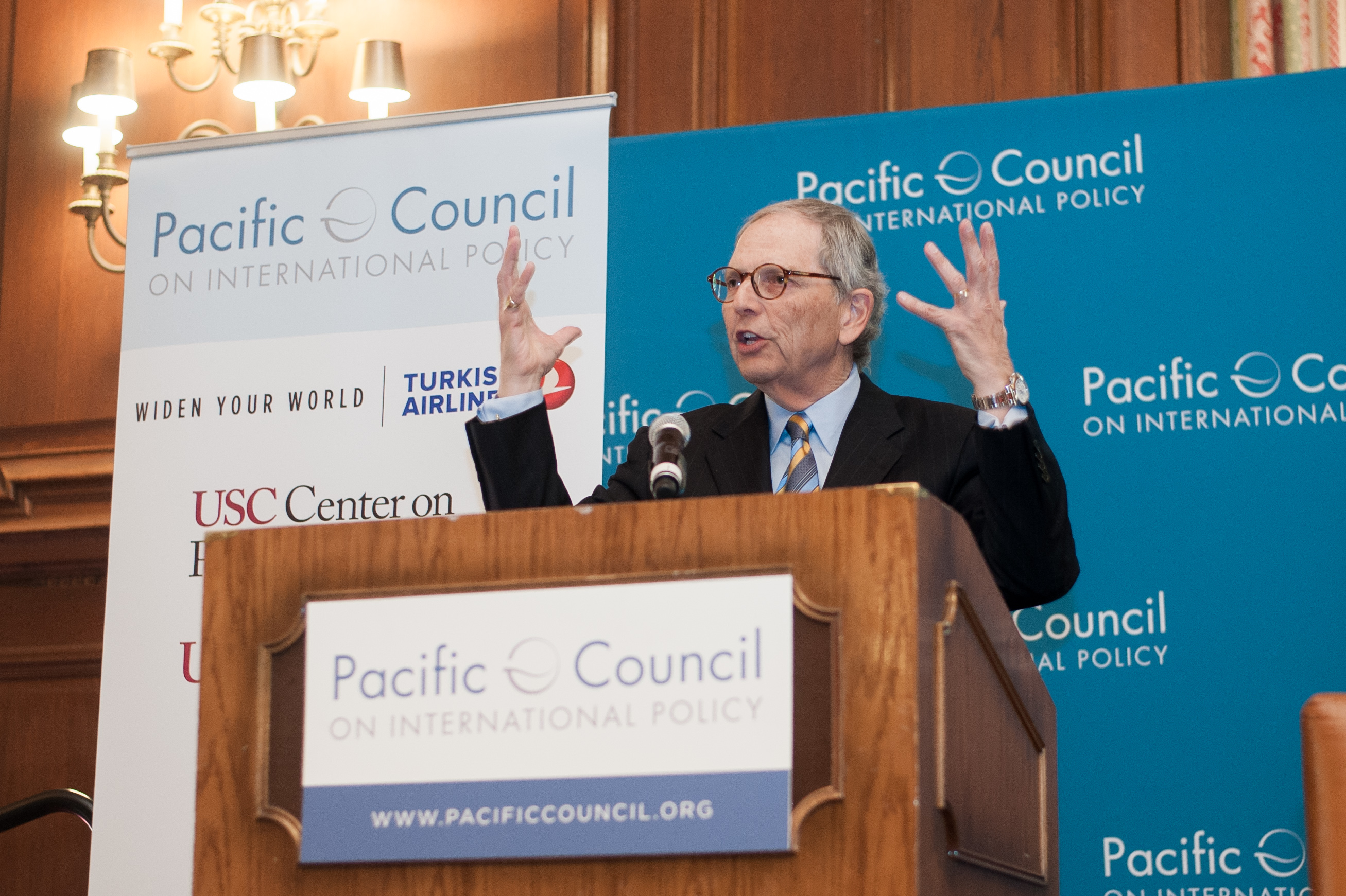
- Born: Boston, Massachusetts, U.S.
- Education: B.A. summa cum laude, University of Massachusetts Boston; M.A., Ph.D., University of Chicago
- Employer(s): Cedars-Sinai Medical Center; UCLA Burkle Center for International Relations
- Known for: Middle East policy and politics
- Title: Global Advisor, Cedars-Sinai Medical Center; Senior Fellow, UCLA Burkle Center for International Relations; President Emeritus, Pacific Council on International Policy

Dr. Jerrold David Green is an American academic and policy professional who serves as global advisor to Cedars-Sinai Medical Center, a Los Angeles-based healthcare organization, and as a senior fellow at the UCLA Burkle Center for International Relations. He is president emeritus of the Pacific Council on International Policy, where he also serves as senior fellow for the Middle East and South Asia and as a member of the board of directors. From 2008 to 2024, he served as president and chief executive officer of the Pacific Council while concurrently serving as a research professor of communication, business, and international relations at the University of Southern California. Green was previously a partner at Best Associates, a merchant banking firm in Dallas, Texas, and held senior management positions at the RAND Corporation, where he was awarded the RAND Medal for Excellence.

Green's work on Middle East policy and politics has appeared in Comparative Politics, the Harvard Journal of World Affairs, The Huffington Post, the Iranian Journal of International Affairs, Politique Étrangère, the RAND Review, Survival, World Politics.

== Early life ==
Born in Boston, Massachusetts, Green graduated summa cum laude with a B.A. in political science from the University of Massachusetts Boston. He earned both an M.A. and a Ph.D. in political science from the University of Chicago, where he specialized in Middle East politics. Green conducted research in Iran during the period of the Iranian Revolution as a fellow at the Tehran-based Iran Communications and Development Institute.

Green was awarded a Fulbright Fellowship to Cairo University in 1982. He has lived and worked in Egypt as a Fulbright Fellow, spent three years in Israel, and conducted field research in Iran. He has also been a visiting fellow at the Chinese Academy of Social Science's West Asian Studies Center in Beijing, a visiting lecturer at the Havana-based Center for African and Middle East Studies (CEAMO), a fellow at the Australian Defence College, and has delivered papers at conferences sponsored by the Iranian Institute of International Affairs in Tehran.

Green was awarded a Fulbright Fellowship to Cairo University in 1982. Green started his academic career as a professor in the Department of Political Science and Center for Near Eastern and North African Studies at the University of Michigan. He then became a professor of political science and sociology at the University of Arizona, where he served as director for The Center for Middle Eastern Studies. He is a member of the Council on Foreign Relations, has served on numerous study groups focusing on international policy, as well as track II initiatives with Iran and Libya.

== Career ==
In 1996, Green became the director at the Center for Middle East Public Policy at the RAND Corporation, and then director of international programs and development at RAND. During that time, Green authored numerous pieces on issues including NATO policy in the Mediterranean, US-Middle East relations, the security policies of Iran, and democracy and Islam in Afghanistan.

Green also served as partner and executive vice president for international operations at Best Associates, a privately held merchant banking firm with global operations, and executive vice president for academic affairs for the Whitney International University System and the senior advisory board of Academic Partnerships, both based in Dallas, Texas. Green later returned to RAND, where he oversaw an attempt to broaden RAND's Middle East-based policy analysis work.

Green has lived as a Fulbright Fellow in Egypt, three years in Israel, and conducted field research in Iran.

From 2008 through June 2024, Green served as president and chief executive officer of the Pacific Council on International Policy in Los Angeles, California. The Pacific Council is a nonpartisan foreign policy organization dedicated to bringing the perspective and resources of the U.S. West Coast to bear on global issues through events, conferences, delegations, and task forces.

During his tenure, Green led three U.S. Department of Defense-sponsored fact-finding delegations to Afghanistan and one to Iraq. He also led Pacific Council fact-finding delegations to Argentina, Chile, China, Cuba, France, Myanmar, North Korea, Russia, Uzbekistan, and South Sudan. In addition, Green served as a member of a joint task force between the Pacific Council and the Consejo Mexicano de Asuntos Internacionales (COMEXI) examining the U.S.–Mexican border, the findings of which were published by the Woodrow Wilson Center.

Green represented the Pacific Council as an observer at the legal proceedings conducted at Guantánamo Bay, Cuba, by the U.S. Department of Defense. Recommendations made by the Council's Guantánamo Bay task force were included in the FY2018 Defense Bill by Congressman Adam Schiff (D-CA). In March 2019, Green received the World Trade Week Southern California Stanley T. Olafson Bronze Plaque Award on behalf of the Los Angeles Area Chamber of Commerce.

Upon his retirement at the end of June 2024, Green assumed the title of president emeritus and continues to serve on the organization's board of directors and as senior fellow for the Middle East and South Asia.

=== Advisory roles ===
Green is a member of the Council on Foreign Relations, the International Institute for Strategic Studies, the California Club (where he serves as global advisor), the Lincoln Club, and the USC Center on Public Diplomacy Advisory Board. He is an HFX Fellow and serves on the Agenda Committee of the annual Halifax International Security Forum. He is also a member of the Los Angeles World Affairs Council and the Bill Richardson Center for Diplomacy/FBI Hostage Recovery Fusion Cell Influencers Group.

Green currently serves as a director of the Whittier Trust Company, on the American advisory board of the Thomas Mann House, the global council of the Colburn School, the steering committee of USA Eisenhower Fellowships, and the honorary advisory council of the Leadership Council for Women in National Security (LCWINS).

Green previously served on the board of directors of the California Club, the advisory committee of The Asia Society of Southern California, the U.S. Department of State Advisory Committee on International Economic Policy, the advisory board of Whitney International University, the advisory board of Academic Partnerships, the board of managers of Falcon Waterfree Technologies, the board of the Middle East Institute at Columbia University, and as an International Medical Corps ambassador. He served for over a decade on the selection committee for the Charlotte W. Newcombe Fellowships conferred by the Woodrow Wilson National Fellowship Foundation, and was a member of the Global Taiwan Institute Bipartisan Task Force on U.S.–Taiwan Relations in the 21st Century. Green served as a member of the U.S. Secretary of the Navy Advisory Panel for eight years, and was awarded the Distinguished Civilian Service Award. Green served as a technical advisor to Activision Publishing where he consulted on the Call of Duty video game series.

== Pacific Council ==
In 2008, Green became the president and chief executive officer of the Pacific Council on International Policy, located in Los Angeles, California. The Pacific Council is "committed to building the vast potential of the West Coast for impact on global issues, discourse, and policy" through its events, conferences, delegations and task forces. The Pacific Council focuses on four specific initiatives: Global Water Scarcity Project, Global Los Angeles, Mexico Initiative, and the Guantánamo Bay Observer Program. Green has led three U.S. Department of Defense-sponsored delegations to Afghanistan and another to Iraq. He has also led Pacific Council fact-finding delegations to Argentina, Chile, China, Cuba, France, Myanmar, North Korea, Russia, Uzbekistan, and South Sudan. In addition, Green served as a member of a joint task force between the Pacific Council and the Consejo Mexicano de Asuntos Internationales (COMEXI) that looked at the U.S.–Mexican border. He has also represented the Pacific Council as an observer at the legal proceedings being conducted at Guantánamo Bay, Cuba, by the U.S. Department of Defense. Recommendations made by the Council's Guantánamo Bay task force were included in the FY2018 Defense Bill by Congressman Adam Schiff (D-CA). In March 2019, Green received the 2019 World Trade Week Southern California Stanley T. Olafson Bronze Plaque Award on behalf of the L.A. Area Chamber of Commerce. Green retired from his role as president and chief executive officer at the end of June 2024.

=== Publications ===
- Revolution in Iran: The Politics of Countermobilization. Praeger, 1982.
- "Friends of the Devil: U.S.-Iran Ties Beyond a Nuclear Deal", Huffington Post World, 21 October 2014.
- "Obama, Take Note: Wireless Revolution is Coming to Myanmar", Huffington Post World, 24 May 2013.
- "The Ghosts of Abu Ghraib Exorcised?" with William Loomis; Huffington Post, 15 July 2010.
- "La politique américaine et le conflit israélo-palestinien", Politique Étrangère, July–September 2002.
- "No Escape", The World Today, Royal Institute of International Affairs, Chatham House, London, 2002.
- "A Memo to the President: Structural Problems in the Middle East", Middle East Insight, November 2000.
- "The Information Revolution and Political Opposition in the Middle East", Middle East Studies Association Bulletin, 1999.
- "An Atlantic Partnership in the Middle East", with David Gompert and F. Steven Larrabee; RAND Review, Spring 1999.
- "Where Are The Arabs?" Survival, 1998.
- "Gulf Security With the Gulf States?" Harvard Journal of World Affairs: The Journal for International Policy, 1995.
- "Israel's Right is Wrong", Al Ahram Weekly (Cairo), 9 November 1995.
- "Conflict, Consensus, and Gulf Security", The Iranian Journal of International Affairs, Winter 1993.
- "Ideology and Pragmatism in Iranian Foreign Policy", Journal of South Asian and Middle Eastern Studies, Fall 1993.
- "Iran's Foreign Policy: Between Enmity and Conciliation", Current History January 1993.
- "Parallel Cities", The New York Times Book Review, 17 November 1991.
- "U.S. AID's Democratic Pluralism Initiative: Pragmatism or Altruism?" Ethics and International Affairs 1991.
- "The Rationality of Collective Political Action: Germany, Israel, and Peru," – Senior Investigator, Funded by the National Science Foundation – 1987–1991.
- "Are Arab Politics Still Arab?" World Politics, July 1986.
- "Terrorism in the Middle East", U.S.A. Today, 11 November 1985.
- "Countermobilization as a Revolutionary Form", Comparative Politics, January 1984.
- "Qadhafi's Not Always to Blame", Wall Street Journal, 11 May 1984.
- Social Science Research Council/Joint Committee on the Middle East of the American Council of Learned Societies Research Grant (Supported by the National Endowment for the Humanities and the Ford Foundation) – 1983–1984

== Awards and honors ==
- Selection Committee member for the U.S. Department of State Herbert Salzman Award for Excellence in International Economic Performance
- Distinguished Civilian Service Award – United States Department of the Navy
- RAND Medal for Excellence
- Joint Committee on the Middle East of the American Council of Learned Societies Research Grant
- Fulbright Senior Fellowship – Cairo University
