= Bankoff =

Bankoff is a surname. Notable people with the surname include:

- André Bankoff (born 1978), Brazilian actor
- Jim Bankoff (born 1969), American businessman
- Leon Bankoff (1908–1997), American mathematician
- S. George Bankoff (1921–2011), American chemical engineer
- Simeon Bankoff (born 1970), American activist
- George Sava (born George Alexis Bankoff; 1902–1996), Russian-born British surgeon
