= Tania Ortiz Mena =

Mexican energy executive

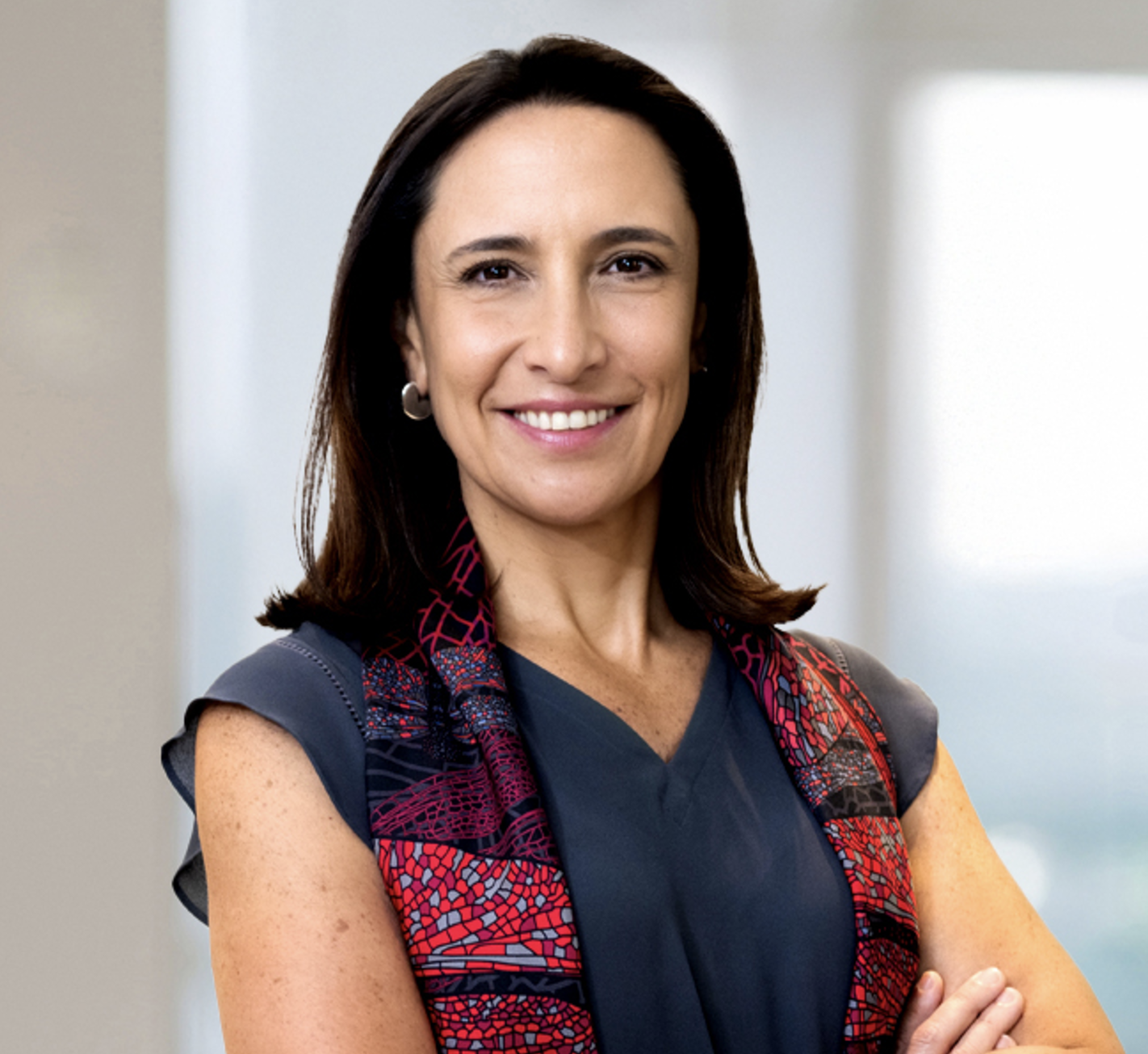
- Born: 1971 (age 54–55); Mexico City, Mexico
- Occupation: President of Sempra Infrastructure for Mexico
- Employer: Sempra Energy

Tania Ortiz Mena López Negrete (Note: In this Mexican name, the surname is Ortiz Mena and the second or maternal family name is López Negrete.) (born 1971) is a Mexican energy executive currently serving as president of Sempra Infrastructure for Mexico, a subsidiary of Sempra Energy, one of North America's leading energy infrastructure companies. She was named one of the 100 most powerful women in Mexico by Forbes in 2020 and 2021. She was also included in Revista Petróleo & Energía's list of 100 leaders in the energy sector.

Great Place to Work México included her in its annual list of best CEOs in Mexico in 2022; and Oil and Gas Investor named her one of its 25 Influential Women in Energy in 2023.

She was also the first woman to serve as general director of IEnova.

== Education ==
Ortiz Mena holds a bachelor's degree in international relations from the Universidad Iberoamericana in Mexico City, and a master's degree in international relations from Boston University. She has worked across multiple areas of the energy sector, including oil, natural gas, petroleum products, petrochemicals and bioenergy. In October 2024, she received an honorary doctorate from the EBC Escuela Bancaria y Comercial in recognition of her leadership in sustainability and contributions to the energy sector.

== Career ==
From 1994 to 1999, Ortiz Mena worked as regional submanager of refined products at PMI Internacional, a subsidiary of PEMEX, overseeing international trade of heavy petroleum products.

In 2000, she joined Sempra Energy in the Vice Presidency of External Affairs and Business Development, later serving as Executive Vice President of Development. In September 2018, she was appointed General Director of IEnova, becoming the first woman to hold that position. She served as general director until September 2021 and sat on the board of directors from January 2019.

Following the merger of IEnova and Sempra LNG, she became president of the Clean Energy and Energy Infrastructure group at Sempra Infrastructure, overseeing a combined portfolio of assets across Mexico and the United States.

Upon joining IEnova's leadership, Ortiz Mena introduced gender policies based on three principles: attracting, retaining and promoting women. She established a program linking the company to universities in which 50% of graduates are women, implemented equal pay policies, extended maternity leave beyond legal requirements, and created lactation rooms. She is a founding member of Voz Experta, a collective of women in the Mexican energy sector. She is also a member of the Women Economic Forum.

Ortiz Mena chaired the board of the Mexican Natural Gas Association in 2015 and 2016, and served on the advisory board of Mexico's Energy Regulatory Commission from 2015 to 2018. She is a member of the Consejo Mexicano de Asuntos Internacionales (COMEXI) and serves as an independent board member of the Mexican Stock Exchange, where she also chairs the Corporate Practices Committee. She also served on the board of Oncor Electric Delivery Company, LLC.

Since 2021, she has chaired the U.S.–Mexico Energy Business Council, a bilateral body created to strengthen energy cooperation between the two countries.
