= Kimberly Marteau Emerson =

American lawyer

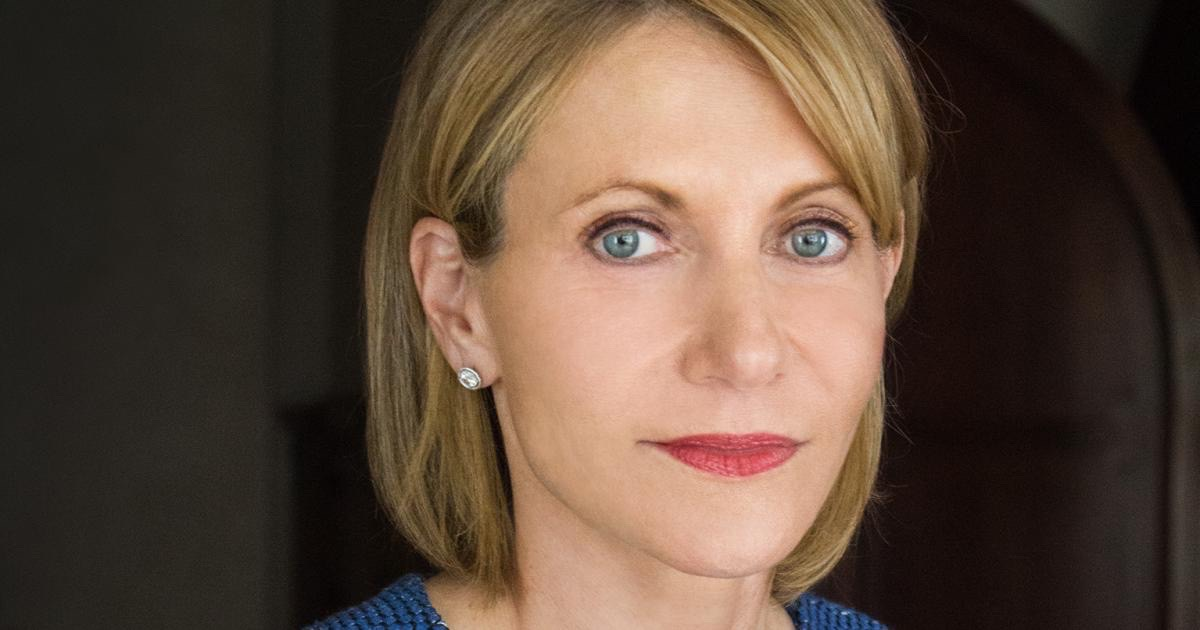
- Born: February 22, 1959 (age 67)
- Education: UCLA, UC Hastings College of the Law, Aix-Marseille University
- Occupations: Attorney, advocate and civic leader
- Years active: 1988–present
- Spouse: John B. Emerson
- Children: 3, including Jacqueline

Kimberly Marteau Emerson is an attorney, advocate and civic leader known for her expertise in the fields of foreign policy, public diplomacy and human rights. She has served in government at the federal and local levels, and engaged in advocacy and relief efforts in some European, African and South Asian countries.

In June 2023, President Joseph R Biden appointed Marteau Emerson to the US Holocaust Memorial Council, the governing body of the US Holocaust Memorial Museum, where she serves on the Education Committee.

Her husband John B. Emerson was the United States Ambassador to Germany from 2013 to 2017. During those years she gained prominence on the transatlantic stage for her efforts to promote ties between the United States and Germany, lead embassy projects during the 2015-16 refugee crisis, and address human rights issues around the world. Marteau Emerson has been active in the Democratic Party since her work on the staff of the 1988 Michael Dukakis presidential campaign, subsequently serving in roles in multiple presidential campaigns. In addition to regular speaking engagements and interviews, she holds leadership positions on a number of transatlantic boards and has served as an unofficial envoy and facilitator of mutual engagement between the sister cities Berlin and Los Angeles.

== Biography ==
Marteau Emerson was born on February 22, 1959, in Los Angeles, California, and was raised there and in Las Vegas, Nevada. She received a Bachelor of Arts degree from UCLA and earned a J.D. from UC Hastings College of the Law, serving as an editor of The Law Journal. After becoming a member of the California Bar Association, Marteau Emerson moved to France and earned the equivalent of a master's degree in French Private Law at Aix-Marseille University. After practicing law with the Los Angeles firm Tuttle & Taylor she transitioned to the entertainment industry, working as a business and creative executive with Savoy Pictures and Sony Pictures Entertainment.

After working on the national advance staff for Michael Dukakis’ presidential run in 1988, Marteau Emerson served as director of the “Vote for a Change” voter registration drive during the 1992 Bill Clinton campaign. She also served on the Platform Committee and was a whip for Clinton/Gore at the 1992 Democratic National Convention. During his first term as president of the United States, Bill Clinton appointed Marteau Emerson director of public liaison for the United States Information Agency (now part of the U.S. State Department), which communicated U.S. policy overseas, attempting to foster stronger ties with citizens of other nations through broadcasters such as the Voice of America and Radio Free Europe. In this role she ran the agency's office of public liaison and served as its domestic spokesperson in addition to handling special assignments: Marteau Emerson joined President Clinton on select overseas trips, including G7 and NATO summits and trips to South Korea, the Czech Republic and Russia. She was involved in numerous public outreach and media projects including a national campaign to send necessary goods and supplies to U.S. soldiers deployed in Bosnia.

After departing the Clinton Administration, Marteau Emerson devoted herself to involvement in human rights, civic leadership and social justice, serving on multiple governmental and nonprofit boards. In 2013 President Barack Obama appointed Marteau Emerson's husband, John B. Emerson, Ambassador to Germany and she joined him in Berlin. Marteau Emerson played a leadership role in the U.S. Embassy in Germany's public diplomacy efforts, notably bringing together female entrepreneurs and leaders in technology and venture capital to help them network and form start-ups. She also supported the formation of the Fashion Council Germany and partnered with Vogue Germany to link style with sustainability through methods such as the upcycling of fabrics; strengthened transatlantic ties between art museums, galleries and artists; and engaged with German non-profit organizations in addressing the 2015–16 European migrant crisis. She also raised awareness of human rights through her work with Human Rights Watch (HRW) and through speaking events and the media.

Marteau Emerson has been the recipient of multiple awards for her community involvement and activism including the People for the American Way Foundation's Spirit of Liberty Award (2004), the Rebecca Thompson Founder's Award from the Los Angeles Children's Chorus (2008), Ira E. Yellin Community Leadership Award from the American Jewish Committee (2009), Music Center of Los Angeles County's Gala Con Brio (2011), foster youth organization United Friends of the Children's Brass Ring Award (2018) and L.A. Theatre Works’ “Art of Diplomacy” honor (2019). After a tsunami struck Sri Lanka in 2005, Marteau Emerson participated in relief efforts led by Operation USA. In 2007 she joined former U.S. Secretary of State Madeleine Albright as an election observer in Nigeria for the National Democratic Institute, and returned for 2011's elections. When in 2015 thousands escaping war, violence and economic instability in their home countries fled to Lesbos, Greece, Marteau Emerson worked there with Swedish relief organization I AM YOU to assist refugees arriving by raft and at the Moria refugee camp.

Marteau Emerson has held leadership positions on a diverse range of boards and councils. After eight years as an active member of Human Rights Watch (HRW), she joined its global Board of Directors in 2012, has served as Vice Chair of the Board since 2022, and has played key roles on several committees and participated in advocacy efforts in a number of countries. She chaired the Advisory Board of the USC Center on Public Diplomacy and has served as a board member for more than 15 years. She also serves on the Council on Foreign Relations, and the Pacific Council on International Policy, where she regularly moderates on foreign policy topics. Marteau Emerson was a founding member of the Transatlantic Advisory Board of the United Way in Germany and holds additional board seats with, among other institutions, Bard College Berlin where she serves as Board Chair, Bard College in Annandale-on-Hudson, the Thomas Mann House and the German-American Institutes, after tenures with NPR’s KCRW Berlin and the Los Angeles Zoo Commission, for which she served one term as president.

In 2017 Marteau Emerson and her family returned to Los Angeles, although speaking engagements and media interviews, her seats on transatlantic boards and other activities bring her back to Germany for several months of the year. In addition to authoring opinion pieces on subjects such as human rights in China and the role of civil society in Berlin, she resumed her long-running fundraising efforts for Democratic Party candidates. Marteau Emerson is Co-Chair of the Southern California Finance Committee of the 2024 Biden-Harris Victory Fund. She has co-hosted events for both Kamala Harris and Joe Biden as presidential candidates, and served on the National Finance Committees of the 2020 Harris presidential campaign, 2020 Biden presidential campaign and 2020 Biden-Harris presidential campaign.

== Personal life ==
Marteau Emerson is married to John B. Emerson, an American diplomat, lawyer and the former United States Ambassador to Germany, who is currently global relationship manager and vice chairman of Capital Group International. The couple has three daughters: Jacqueline, Taylor and Hayley.
