= John B. Emerson =

American lawyer

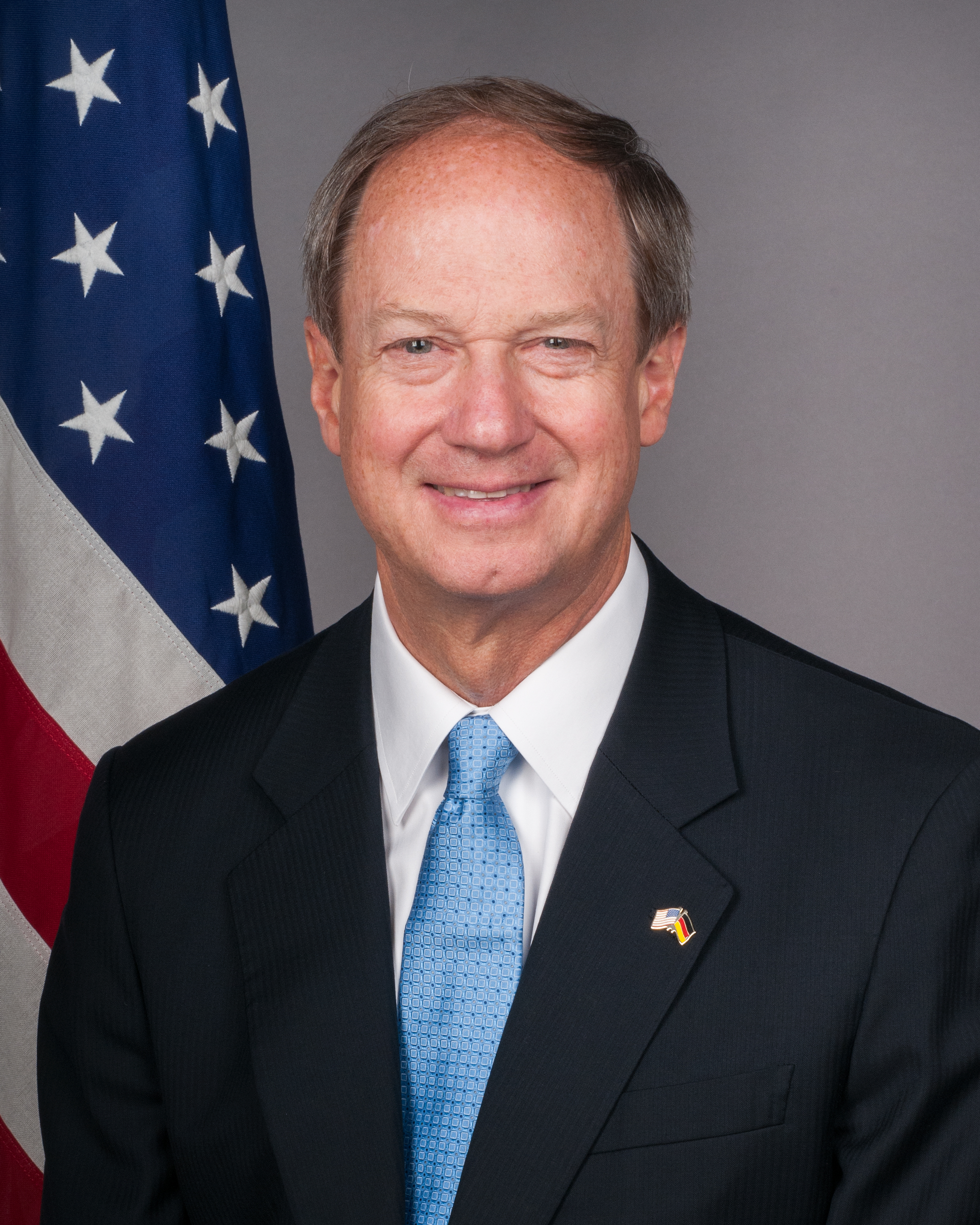

United States Ambassador to Germany
- In office August 26, 2013 – January 20, 2017
- President: Barack Obama
- Deputy: Kent Logsdon
- Preceded by: Phil Murphy
- Succeeded by: Richard Grenell

Personal details
- Born: John Bonnell Emerson; January 11, 1954 (age 72) Chicago, Illinois, U.S.
- Party: Democratic
- Spouse: Kimberly Marteau
- Children: Hayley; Taylor; Jacqueline
- Education: Hamilton College, New York; University of Chicago

John Bonnell Emerson (born January 11, 1954) is an American diplomat, lawyer, business executive and the former United States Ambassador to Germany, having served from 2013 to 2017. Emerson was the 2015 recipient of the State Department's Sue M. Cobb Award for Exemplary Diplomatic Service, which is given annually to a non-career ambassador who has used private sector leadership and management skills to make a significant impact on bilateral or multilateral relations through proactive diplomacy. In 2017 he was the recipient of both the CIA Medal and the United States Navy Distinguished Public Service Award, which is its highest civilian honor.

Emerson currently serves as Vice Chairman of Capital Group International. He has been the Chairman of the American Council on Germany since 2018.

== Biography ==
Emerson was raised in Bloomfield, New Jersey, and Larchmont, New York. He received his bachelor's degree in government and philosophy from Hamilton College in 1975, and in 2017 the college named him an Honorary Doctor of Laws. After earning a J.D. from the University of Chicago Law School in 1978, Emerson practiced law with Manatt, Phelps and Phillips and made partner in 1983.

Emerson then served as deputy campaign manager for Gary Hart’s presidential campaign until its dissolution in May 1987. After questioning Hart about his weekend with Donna Rice when the story of their extramarital affair broke, Emerson said to another top aide, “I’m a team player. Hart can trust me to the moon. But I’m not buying this shit.” Emerson was played by Tommy Dewey in Jason Reitman’s film about the scandal, The Front Runner, starring Hugh Jackman in the title role.

Next Emerson served as chief deputy/chief of staff in the city attorney’s office in Los Angeles, under City Attorney James K. Hahn. In 1988 the Los Angeles Times recognized him as a “Rising Star” in Southern California. Three years later, Emerson lost a race for the California State Assembly by 31 votes.

Emerson was active in a number of subsequent political campaigns, including serving as Bill Clinton’s California campaign manager in 1992. After Clinton was elected president, Emerson worked in the White House as deputy director of intergovernmental affairs. In that role he served as liaison to the nation’s governors and coordinated the administration’s efforts to obtain congressional approval of the Uruguay Round of the GATT trade agreement.

During his tenure at the White House, Emerson was acknowledged as the president’s chief liaison in handling California issues such as the aftermath of the 1994 Northridge earthquake. In Clinton’s autobiography, My Life, he dubbed Emerson “the Secretary of California” for his dedication to the state's concerns.

Emerson subsequently worked at Capital Group Companies, an international investment management company headquartered in Los Angeles. He became president of private client services and served in that capacity for 16 years. During this period he chaired an independent citizens committee to redraw the city council lines for Los Angeles’ districts and presided over the 2003 opening of Walt Disney Concert Hall, as Chairman of the Los Angeles Music Center.

In 2010 President Barack Obama appointed Emerson to his Advisory Committee for Trade Policy and Negotiations, a post he held for three years. In 2013 Obama tabbed Emerson as the U.S. ambassador to Germany. After being confirmed by the U.S. Senate and sworn in, Emerson and his family arrived in Berlin on August 15, 2013. Less than two months later, the news broke that the National Security Agency tapped the mobile phone of Angela Merkel, then Chancellor of Germany. As the U.S. ambassador, it was Emerson's responsibility to rebuild the broken trust between the governments.

Upon returning to Los Angeles in January 2017, Emerson rejoined Capital Group as Vice Chairman of Capital International. In this capacity he works with colleagues and clients throughout the United States, Europe and Asia, focusing primarily on geopolitical risk.

== Personal life ==
Emerson is married to attorney and civic leader Kimberly Marteau Emerson. They have three daughters: Hayley, Taylor and Jacqueline Emerson.

Before and after moving to Germany Emerson and his wife were active in civic affairs, serving on a number of non-profit boards including the YMCA of Metropolitan Los Angeles, the Pacific Council on International Policy, the American Council on Germany (as Chairman), the German Marshall Fund, American Friends of the Munich Security Conference, the Ralph M. Parsons Foundation, the Buckley School and Marlborough School.

Emerson is a past recipient of the People for the American Way Spirit of Liberty Award, the Legal Aid Foundation of Los Angeles Access to Justice Award, the American Jewish Committee’s Ira E. Yellin Community Leadership Award and the United Friends of the Children Brass Ring Award.

Diplomatic posts
Preceded by Phil Murphy	United States Ambassador to Germany; 2013–2017	Succeeded by Richard Grenell
