= Ehsan Zaffar =

American activist

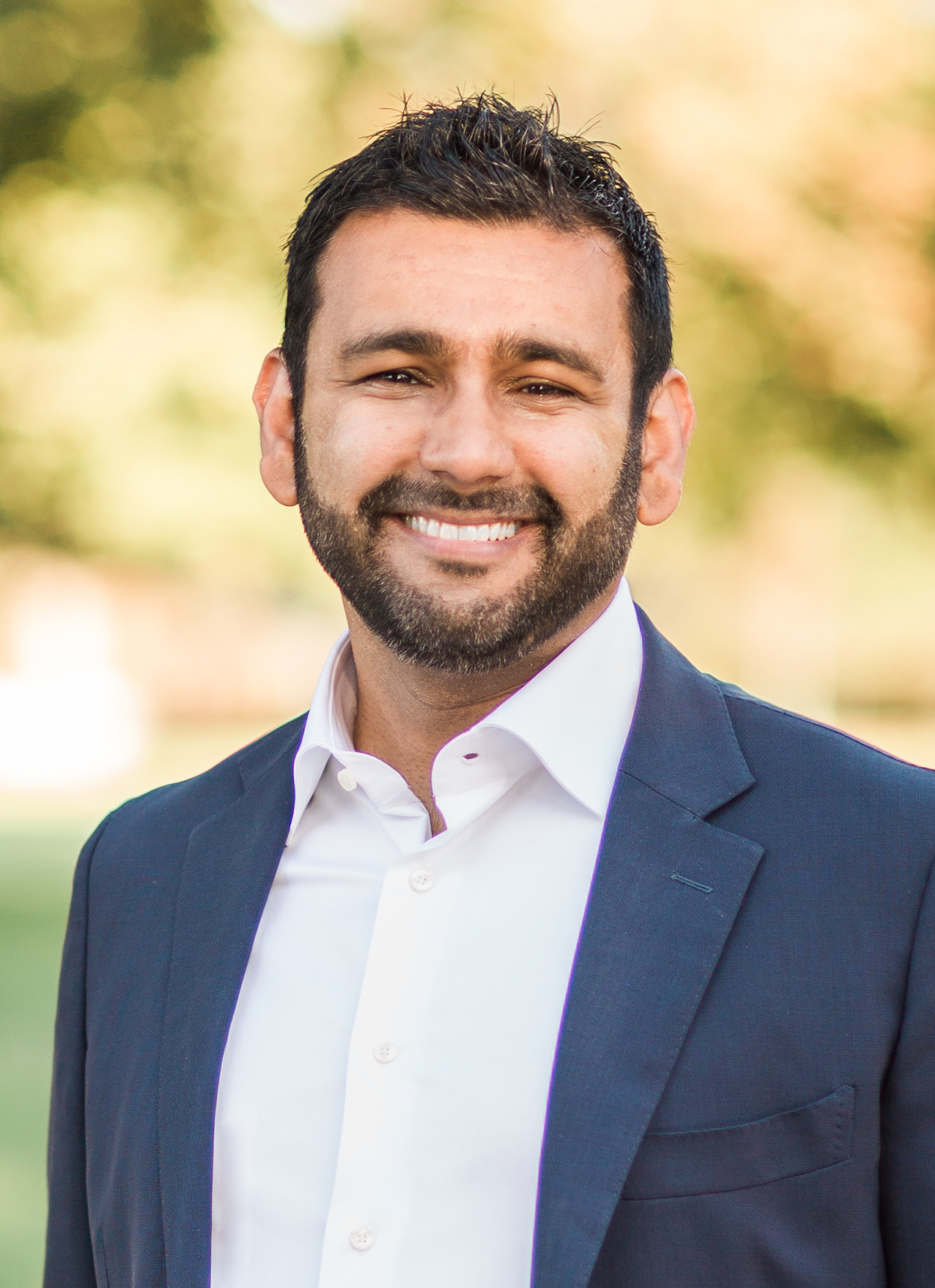
- Occupations: Educator, advocate, policymaker

Ehsan Zaffar is a civil rights advocate, educator and policymaker and the founder of the Los Angeles Mobile Legal Aid Clinic (LAMLAC), which helped to pioneer the delivery of mobile legal care to vulnerable populations in California and across the nation.

Zaffar primarily studies issues related to inequality and equity, and most recently the disparate impact of national and homeland security laws and policies on protected classes and other minority communities with a particular emphasis on Establishment Clause and First Amendment (religious freedom) limitations surrounding security, privacy, and law enforcement. He served as Senior Advisor on civil rights at the United States Department of Homeland Security. He is a member of the faculty at George Washington University's Graduate School of Political Management and author of Understanding Homeland Security: Foundations of Security Policy.

In 2016, he joined General (Ret.) David Petraeus as a member of the board of Team Rubicon. Zaffar serves on the board of ACLU California is a Council Member of Chatham House at the Royal Institute of International Affairs, the Council on Foreign Relations, and the Pacific Council on International Policy, and is a member of the Human Rights Watch Los Angeles Committee. He is the recipient of the U.S. State Department's Benjamin Franklin Award for Public Diplomacy and the Department of Homeland Security Secretary's Award for Excellence.

In February 2026, Zaffar was appointed by Governor Gavin Newsom to the California Commission on the State of Hate, which advises the Governor of California on policies to address hate crimes and hate incidents.

Zaffar serves as a visiting fellow at the University of Southern California's Sol Price School of Public Policy where his scholarly work focuses on social, political and economic inequality and he is also a Senior Scholar (non-resident) at the University of California, Berkeley.

In 2021 he was appointed by Arizona State University President Michael M. Crow to found The Difference Engine, an initiative to study practical ways to reduce social, political and economic inequality in the United States. In 2024, The Difference Engine received investment from Bob Pozen and NBA Hall of Famer Earvin “Magic” Johnson to support its work in addressing inequality. He has teaching appointments at ASU's Sandra Day O'Connor College of Law and the School of Social Transformation at ASU.

He hosts UnfairNation, a podcast on inequality. Notable guests have included Dr. Thomas Nolan of the Boston Police Department and Nick Martin of TechChange, Jamie Harrison - Chair of the Democratic National Committee and Dr. Erroll Southers among others.
