= USC Center on Public Diplomacy =

University of Southern California diplomacy program

The University of Southern California Center on Public Diplomacy is an academic research, teaching and training center created by the USC Annenberg School for Communication and Journalism and the USC Dornsife College of Letters, Arts and Sciences' School of International Relations at University of Southern California.

In 2008, USC received the inaugural Benjamin Franklin Award for Public Diplomacy from the U.S. State Department in recognition of the university's teaching, training, and research in public diplomacy.

The USC Center on Public Diplomacy and Portland, a UK-based consultancy firm, together have published an annual Soft Power 30 index.

The USC Center on Public Diplomacy is a full member of the Association of Professional Schools of International Affairs (APSIA), a group of public policy, public administration, and international studies schools.

== People associated with the center ==
=== Advisory board ===
As of August 2024, the CPD Advisory Board consists of 23 members, including:

- Barry Sanders (chair)
- Mel Levine (past Chair)
- Goli Ameri
- Colleen Bell
- Fadi Chehadé
- Colleen Graffy
- Jerrold D. Green
- Gary Hart
- David Huebner
- Gary E. Knell
- Markos Kounalakis
- Loida Lewis
- Kimberly Marteau Emerson
- Mike Medavoy
- Farah Pandith
- Ponchitta Pierce
- Marie Royce
- Jay Snyder

=== Academic staff ===
As at August 2024, the CPD includes 36 Faculty Fellows, including:

- Laurie Brand
- Geoffrey Cowan
- Nicholas J. Cull is professor of public diplomacy and inaugural director of the master's program in public diplomacy at USC.
