= Leslie Gilbert-Lurie =

American author, community leader, philanthropist, lawyer and former television executive

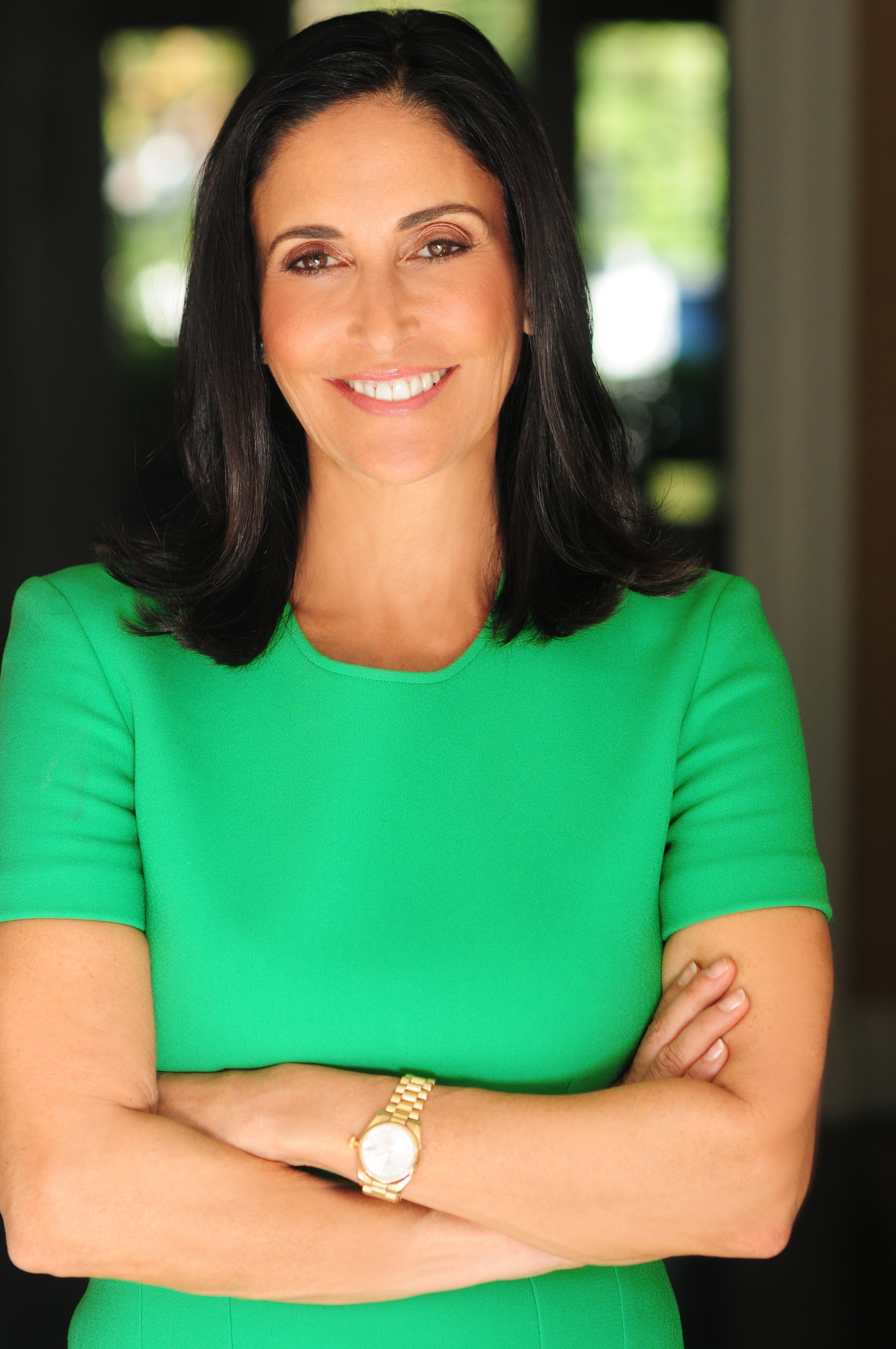

Leslie Gilbert-Lurie is an American author, community leader, philanthropist, lawyer, and former television executive. Her memoir, Bending Toward the Sun, was published in 2009 by HarperCollins. She frequently moderates panel discussions and publicly speaks on topics related to human rights and policy reform.

== Career ==
Gilbert-Lurie is the author of Bending Toward the Sun, a memoir written with her mother, chronicling her mother's experience in The Holocaust, and the inter-generational transmission of trauma. She speaks at middle schools, high schools, colleges, universities, churches and synagogues about her book, the Holocaust, and its implications for the world today.

Gilbert-Lurie spent her early career as a television executive. At NBC she oversaw NBC Productions and the comedy division, co-wrote television episodes of Alf and Saved by The Bell, and co-founded an in-house production company, Lurie-Horowitz productions. She has also consulted for USA Network and Disney Television. As a lawyer, Gilbert-Lurie worked briefly at the law firm of Manatt, Phelps, Rothenberg and Tunney, and she served as a Ninth Circuit Court of Appeals Law Clerk for Judge Harry Pregerson.

In July 2022, she was appointed to the California State University Board of Trustees by Governor Gavin Newsom.

== Advocacy and community leadership ==
Today, Gilbert-Lurie is a human rights and children's rights advocate and activist. She is a Director of Human Rights Watch's International Board, and has co-chaired Human Rights Watch's Los Angeles Committee. Additionally, she serves on the Pacific Council on International Policy’s Board of Directors, and on the Board of the Mayor’s Fund for Los Angeles. She is also a founding board member and past board chair of the Alliance for Children's Rights, a legal rights organization for abused, at risk, and foster youth. In further advance of child welfare reform, Gilbert-Lurie served as the Vice Chair of the Los Angeles Blue Ribbon Commission on Child Welfare, which led to policy change in Los Angeles County.

Gilbert-Lurie has worked to improve public education in a variety of settings. She is a member of the UCLA Foundation and the Board of Advisors to the UCLA Ronald Reagan Medical Center. As a student at UCLA, she was the Student Regent, on the Board of Regents of the University of California. She served for fourteen years on the Los Angeles County Board of Education, and was President of that Board for three terms.

== Awards and honors ==
- Facing History and Ourselves "2010 Upstander of the Year" Award
- Los Angeles Magazine: LA Women (2012)
- The HeArt Project, Co-Honoree (with Sir Ken Robinson and Seth MacFarlane) (2012)
- American Jewish Committee Ira Yellin Community Leadership Award (with Cliff Gilbert-Lurie) (2011)
- Alliance for Children's Rights National Champion for Children Award (with Cliff Gilbert-Lurie) (2004)
- Recipient, American Jewish Congress Tzedek Award, "For Outstanding Commitment to Civil Rights, Civil Liberties, and Justice" (1998)
- Outstanding Senior Award, UCLA Alumni Association (1981)

== Personal life ==
Gilbert-Lurie lives in Los Angeles with her husband, Cliff Gilbert-Lurie.
