= James Ferguson House =

Antebellum house in South Carolina, US

Coordinates: 32.788766°N 79.938071°W

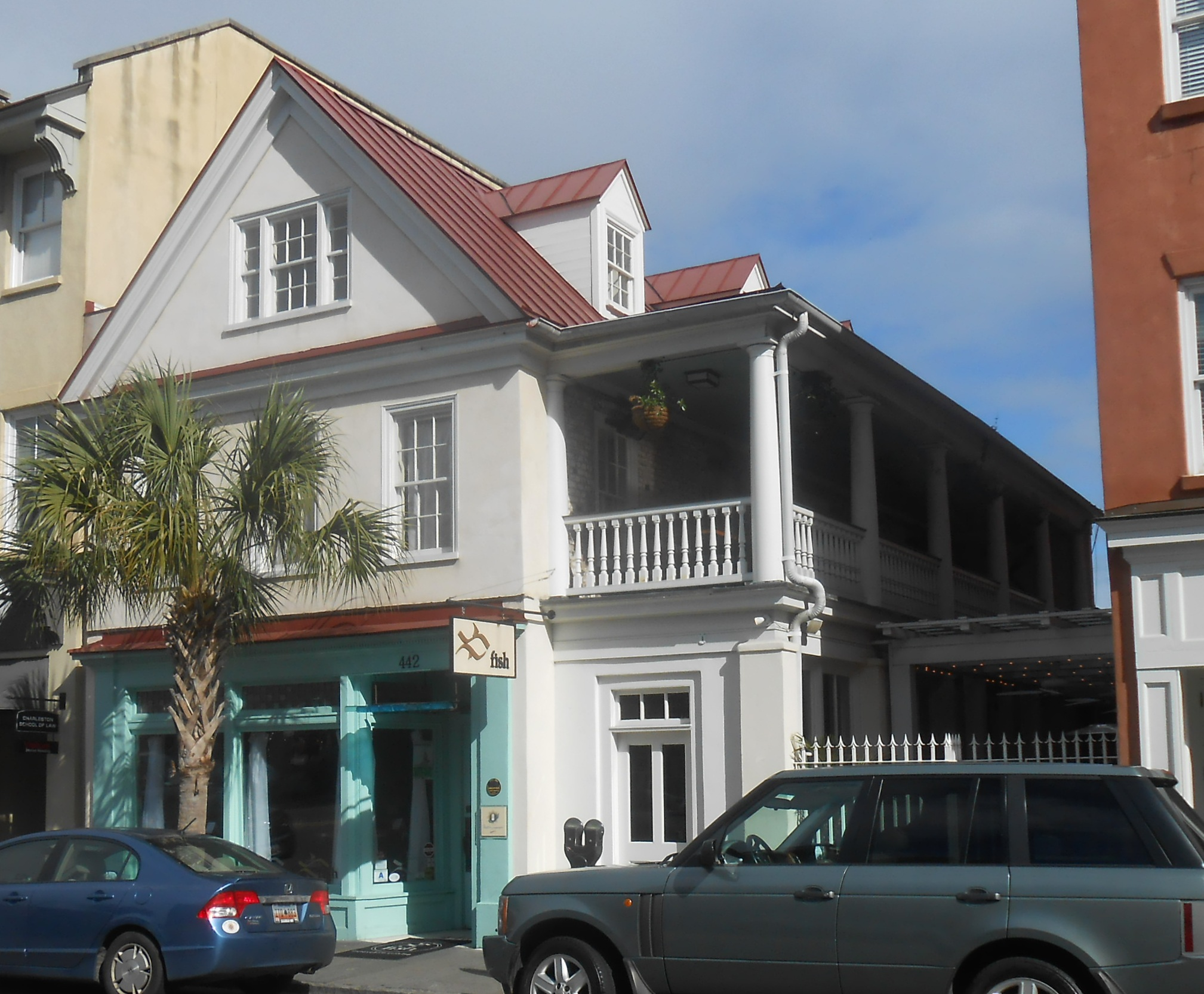
Now a restaurant, the building at 442 King St. was built for James Ferguson before 1840.

The James Ferguson House at 442 King St., Charleston, South Carolina, is an antebellum house dating to at least 1840. As of 2000 it was being used as a restaurant.

The house was constructed for James Ferguson, a planter from Berkeley County, South Carolina. Subsequently, it was owned by the Amme family, well known locally for their bakery. The family renovated the house and added a Victorian storefront, giving it the appearance of a three-story building.

By 1976, the house was in poor condition. The Charleston Board of Architectural Review approved its demolition subject to a 180-day delay; preservationists opposed the demolition as the house was an especially early building for upper King Street. Before the house was razed, two men bought it with the intent of turning it into a restaurant.

However, the house was not restored until more than 20 years later when a neighboring property owner purchased it and restored it. The house became the location of Fish, a Charleston restaurant. The restoration returned the appearance of its front façade to the 1840s era.
