= Annenberg Hall =

Annenberg Hall may refer to:

- Annenberg Hall, a division of Memorial Hall at Harvard College
- Wallis Annenberg Hall, at the University of Southern California
