= Robert D. English =

American historian

Personal details
- Education: University of California, Berkeley (B.A.); Princeton University (MPA, PhD)

Robert David English (born 1958) is an American academic, author, historian, and international relations scholar who specializes in the history and politics of contemporary Eastern Europe, the USSR, and Russia. He is an associate professor of International Foreign Policy and Defense Analysis at the University of Southern California (USC) School of International Relations.

== Early life ==
Born in 1958, he received a B.A. in history from the University of California, Berkeley in 1980. He later received an M.P.A. from the Woodrow Wilson School of Public and International Affairs at Princeton University in 1982 and a Ph.D. in politics from Princeton University in 1995. As part of his doctorate, English completed a Ph.D. dissertation titled "Russia views the West: the intellectual and political origins of Soviet new thinking."

== Career ==
He worked in the US Department of Defense from 1982 to 1986 and the Committee for National Security between 1986 and 1988. He taught as an assistant professor at the Bologna Center in the Johns Hopkins School of Advanced International Relations (SAIS) before he became assistant professor in the School of International Relations at the University of Southern California.

In addition, he has received fellowships from places like the Institute for Advanced Study; the Princeton Society of Fellows; the U.S. Fund for Peace; the International Research & Exchanges Board; and the Ford Foundation, where he has a "'Dual Expertise Fellowship' in Soviet/East European and national security affairs."

== Author ==
He wrote parts of Rebirth: A Political History of Europe Since World War II with Cyril E. Black, Jonathan E. Helmreich, and A. James McAdams in 1999. In 2000, he co-edited My Six Years With Gorbachev: Notes from a Diary with Jack F. Matlock, Jr. and Elizabeth Tucker, which is the account of Anatoly S. Chernyaev's time as an aide to Mikhail Gorbachev.

His most notable work is Russia and the Idea of the West: Gorbachev, Intellectuals, and the End of the Cold War, an intellectual history of the rise to power of Gorbachev and his 'New Thinking' in the USSR. The book first charts the origins and nature of "Old Thinking," which persisted in the traditional Marxist-Leninist doctrine of the USSR, and he goes on to chart the changes in society and of intellectual class in the history of the USSR under Khrushchev, Brezhnev, and Gorbachev.

He is working on a "book-length study," to be called Our Serbian Brethren: History, Myth, and the Politics of Russian National Identity. He is writing the entry for The Kosovo War in the next edition of the Oxford Encyclopedia of World Politics. He is also contributing a chapter, The Path(s) not Taken: Contingency and Counterfactual in Analysis of the Cold War's End, in a book to be edited by William C. Wohlforth, Witnesses to the End of the Cold War: Oral History, Analysis, Debates.

== Recognition ==
In 1996, English won the Harold D. Lasswell Prize from the American Political Science Association (APSA) for the work that he later used in writing Russia and the Idea of the West: Gorbachev, Intellectuals, and the End of the Cold War.

In 2001, he received the Marshall Shulman Prize from the American Association for the Advancement of Slavic Studies.
