= Steven Lamy =

American professor

Steven Lamy is a professor of international relations and a Vice Dean for the USC Dana and David Dornsife College of Letters, Arts and Sciences at the University of Southern California. He is also a past Director of the University of Southern California School of International Relations.

A native of New Hampshire, Professor Lamy earned his undergraduate degree from Siena College , and his PhD from the Graduate School of International Studies at the University of Denver, specializing in foreign policy analysis. While doing his doctoral work, Steven Lamy studied with future United States Secretary of State Condoleezza Rice. Professor Lamy focuses on the foreign policy of Canada, Australia, New Zealand and Western Europe. He also explores alternatives to Realist thinking, including communitarian theory and the questions raised by the World Order Models Project.

Professor Lamy is a professor of international relations at University of Southern California; he has been named professor of the year four times. He regularly teaches IR 210 Introductory Analysis and IR 341 Foreign Policy Analysis. Outside of the classroom, Professor Lamy is the founder of the Teaching International Relations Program, which places undergraduate international relations majors in local secondary schools, in order to expose local children to the field of international relations. Additionally, he was the director of USC's Center for Excellence in Teaching and its Center for Public Education in International Affairs. In addition, he is a frequent lecturer for One Day University. He is also the co-Principal Investigator in a Luce Foundation Grant on Religion Identity and Global Governance.

== Publications ==
- Contemporary International Issues: Contending Perspectives, 1988
- International Relations for the Twenty-First Century (McGraw-Hill, 2004)
- Policy Responses to Ethno-Nationalism (1985)
- The Dutch in Srebrenica: A Noble Mission Fails (Georgetown, Institute for the Study of Diplomacy, 2001)
- We Simply Disagree: The Europeans and the Bush Administration (Georgetown, Institute for the Study of Diplomacy, 2003)
- "The G-8 and the Human Security Agenda" in New Directions in Global Governance (Ashgate, 2002)

== Resources ==
- Biography on USC School of International Relations website
- Syllabus for IR210 (in .pdf format)
- Syllabus for IR341 (in .pdf format)
- RIGG Project Website
