= Wallis Annenberg Hall =

Building at the University of Southern California

Coordinates: 34.0208°N 118.28705°W

Wallis Annenberg Hall

Wallis Annenberg Hall (or simply Annenberg Hall) is a building at the University of Southern California. It cost $150 million to build and is dedicated to "media education, communication and production." Dean Ernest Wilson has stated that the new building for the USC Annenberg School for Communication and Journalism is intended to facilitate collaboration between students and faculty, as part of a larger initiative to reform and modernize within the school.
