= Les Beilinson =

American architect

- Born: November 7, 1946; Miami, Florida
- Died: June 14, 2013 (aged 66); Miami, Florida
- Occupation(s): Architect, Preservationist
- Spouse: Sherry G Beilinson
- Children: Tory Johnson, David Beilinson

Les Dennis Beilinson (7 November 1946 – 14 June 2013) was an American architect and preservationist. He was known for his work in Miami's Art Deco district, both preserving existing architecture and ensuring its ongoing viability through modernization and upgrade for commercial purposes. As a founding member of the City of Miami Historic Preservation board, Beilinson was a defender of the glory days of 1940s and 1950s Miami against threats from unmoderated development. Beilinson was the founding partner of Beilinson Gomez Architects, PA, in partnership with Jose Gomez, AIA.

== Biography ==
=== Early life ===
Beilinson grew up in Miami Beach during the 1940s and 1950s, years associated with the development of the city's unique Art Deco district. Beilinson attended the Miami Beach Senior High School and subsequently, the University of Miami where he graduated in Architecture.

=== Expanded description ===
As a professional architect, Beilinson was an early advocate of the movement to preserve the city’s Art Deco heritage, including as an original member of the Historic Preservation Board. Beilinson practiced his advocacy both through his professional and community participation.

Beilinson was also a veteran of the United States Reserve.

=== Restoration projects ===
In reference to the buildings Beilinson worked to preserve, he observed: “The majority are shoe boxes with wood frame construction on the inside and front facades and small public lobby spaces, many were severely deteriorated with a lot of sagging,’’ he said. “The concrete had a high salt content that deteriorated the steel bars and beams reinforcing it — I looked at some of these buildings and I didn’t know what kept them standing,” Beilinson told the American Institute of Architects in 2010, when the group’s Miami chapter named him Historic Architect of the Year.

Beilinson was involved in some buildings repeatedly, including the original conversion of Casa Casuarina into the Versace Mansion, and subsequently, its conversion into a high end hotel.

With his expertise in wood-frame construction, Beilinson also worked outside of Miami through his practice, Beilinson Gomez Architects, he worked on the historic Lyric Theater, Overtown, Freedom Tower, Hialeah Park, and the Opa-locka and Coral Gables city halls.

- Temple Beth Sholom, with PKSB Architects. Temple Beth Sholom was Beilinson's own temple.
- Española Way
- Essex House
- The Marlin
- Edison
- Breakwater
- Park Central
- Century
- Shore Park
- Traymore
- Tiffany
- Ritz Plaza
- Imperial Hotels
- Freedom Tower
- Betsy Ross

=== Modern and new works ===
Amongst Beilinson's modern and new works were:

- News Cafe, Miami Beach
- Armani Exchange, Miami Beach
- High End Residences
- Super Bowl 2010, 23-foot arched structure supporting a football, Miami Beach
- Capt. Harry's, Miami
- Vintro Hotel, Fort Lauderdale
- Modani, Fort Lauderdale

=== Marriage and children ===
Beilinson was married and had two children.

=== Death and afterward ===
Beilinson died June 14, 2013, at Mount Sinai Medical Center from complications of abdominal surgery. Beilinson lived throughout his life in his hometown. His family's wish was that his legacy be preserved through contributions to the Miami Design Preservation League.

== Approach to architectural practice ==
In her book, Deco Delights: Preserving The Beauty and Joy of Miami Beach Architecture, preservation pioneer Barbara Baer Capitman noted just how important Beilinson’s projects were to the Art Deco legacy. “Without saving the great hotels and theaters and storefronts, the district would never exist as we know it,” she wrote. “With the protection of the wonderful architecture, we have seen the other aspects of the district remain and indeed blossom.”

It was the relationship with Barbara Baer Capitman that first saw Beilinson develop his interest in historic preservation into action in the 1970s. Beilinson said “Barbara was very driven, knew what she wanted and she persevered to get it. She was the first one to see these old 1930s buildings as a resource for Miami Beach – and she was convincing.”

“Les Beilinson was an early believer in both the beauty of the Art Deco District and the power of historic preservation to transform and elevate communities,’’ said Beth Dunlop, editor of the architecture magazine MODERN. “Throughout the years, he played a critical role in safeguarding our precious heritage.’’

Jose Gomez, business partner of Beilinson said: “Les was... ...was also a pioneer and visionary who played a key role in restoring South Beach to its glory days, starting in the late ’70s when he and a handful of architects and historic preservationists fought developers’ plans to raze much of South Beach." “During ensuing years, Les was instrumental in helping preserve South Beach history, with more than 200 projects to his credit. It is safe to say that without Les, South Beach would not be what it is today."

== Awards and recognition ==
Amongst forty three awards achieved by Les Beilinson, both directly and through Beilinson Gomez Architects, PA:

- 2010, American Institute of Architects (AIA) Miami chapter, Historic Architect of the Year
- 2008, Miami Chapter, American Institute of Architects, 2008 Design Award, Barbara Residence, Miami Beach.
