= Robert L. Friedheim =

Academic background
- Education: Columbia University (BA, MA); University of Washington (PhD)

Academic work
- Discipline: International relations
- Sub-discipline: Law of the sea
- Institutions: Purdue University; Center for Naval Analysis; University of Southern California

Robert Lyle Friedheim (August 1, 1934 – January 31, 2001) was an international relations scholar and professor at the University of Southern California. He was a former director of the USC School of International Relations.

== Biography ==
Friedheim was born on August 1, 1934, in New York City. He earned his bachelor's and master's degrees from Columbia University and a doctorate in political science from the University of Washington. He served in the United States Army in military intelligence.

Friedheim began his career teaching political science at Purdue University. He then turned to international oceanic law when he went to work for the Center for Naval Analysis in Arlington County, Virginia, as a researcher and director of the Law of the Sea Project.

Friedheim joined the faculty in 1976 and directed USC's Sea Grant Program for interdisciplinary research that focuses on the ocean environment and regulations to protect and utilize its resources. From 1986 to 1996, he was an advisor to the United States Arctic Research Commission.

From 1992 to 1995, he chaired the USC School of International Relations and was associate director of its Institute for Marine and Coastal Sciences. His research has focused on ocean and environmental policy, and he has written extensively on the Law of the sea and whaling policy, which influenced policymaking in those areas. He also chronicled the history of the 1919 Seattle General Strike.

Friedheim died on January 31, 2001, at Playa del Rey, Los Angeles, of lung cancer.
