= The Last Survivors =

- Directed by: Thomas Hammock
- Written by: Jacob Forman; Thomas Hammock
- Produced by: Seth Caplan; Chris Harding
- Starring: Haley Lu Richardson; Booboo Stewart; Max Charles; Michael Welch; Jon Gries
- Cinematography: Seamus Tierney
- Edited by: Adam Wingard; Sarah Broshar
- Music by: Craig Deleon
- Production company: Federighi Films
- Release date: June 12, 2014 (LAFF)
- Running time: 95 minutes
- Country: United States
- Language: English

The Last Survivors (original title The Well) is a 2014 American post-apocalyptic film directed by Thomas Hammock and written by Hammock and Jacob Forman. It stars Haley Lu Richardson, Booboo Stewart, Nicole Fox, Jacqueline Emerson, Max Charles, Michael Welch and Rena Owen. Set in Oregon, the film revolves around a dystopian world with a shortage of water.

== Plot ==
Ten years after rain ceases to fall, Oregon has turned into a dry wasteland. Survivors spend their time desperately trying to locate enough water to stay alive and avoiding hostile scavengers. Kendal takes care of fellow orphan Dean, who is near death from kidney failure. Her friend Gabriel, who lives on a nearby farm, urges her to join him, but she refuses to abandon Dean. One day, after hearing a cry for help on their two-way radio, Kendal leaves to assist the caller. She finds that it is a trap to ensnare the family's neighbors. Kendal hides as marauders kill off the remaining family members, unable to save them, then sneaks back to her house in the dark.

As the local wells go dry, Dean theorizes that a local warlord, Carson, has drilled to the aquifer and is draining everyone's water supply. Carson owns a small compound that he advertises as a safe haven. Kendal's neighbor Grace, after her well goes dry, tells Kendal that she has accepted Carson's offer to join him. Grace urges Kendal to accompany her and Gabriel, as she believes Carson has medicine that can help Dean. Kendal remains skeptical and hides when Carson arrives. Carson abruptly kills Gabriel's entire family, saying that everyone but Gabriel is either too old or infirm to save based on the limited amount of water available. Though horrified, Gabriel reluctantly agrees and turns in a relative who was also hiding. Kendal escapes after killing a sentry.

Kendal checks on Alby, a young boy who lives on his own. She tells him of Dean's plan to escape via a Cessna that has been almost fully repaired; all they need is the proper distributor cap. However, Alby says he is better able to survive on his own and asks her not to visit him so often, as it attracts Carson's attention. After finally recovering the proper distributor cap from a car in Carson's compound, Kendal returns home again, only to find that three survivors have wandered onto their property in search of water. Dean convinces Kendal to donate water to them, though Kendal remains suspicious of their intentions. When they return shortly afterward, her suspicions are confirmed as they seek to steal the remaining water. Dean, barely able to walk, shoots them before they can kill Kendal.

Drawn by the sound of gunshots as he surveys the local farms, Carson investigates. Dean kills several of Carson's men before they kill him. After killing one of his men, who has become wounded and thus a liability, Carson expresses regret that he is not able to save more of the survivors. His lieutenant, a man in priest's garb, reassures him that what they do is for the greater good. Kendal once again escapes after hiding from Carson's men and retrieves a katana from one the graves at Grace's farm. Now armed, she returns to the house and kills the men left behind to search it, including the priest and Gabriel, whose identity was obscured by a mask.

When Kendal checks on Alby to invite him to escape with her on the Cessna, she discovers Carson has abducted him. She attacks Carson's compound and kills all his henchmen. When only Kendal, Carson, his daughter, and Alby remain, Carson attacks Kendal, who kills him with the katana. Brooke, Carson's daughter, nearly defeats Kendal by putting her in a choke hold. Kendal breaks free just before passing out and stabs Brooke with the sword. She and Alby go to the Cessna and, after inserting the distributor cap, start it up. As they board the plane, Alby asks about Dean, and Kendal says that he is staying behind.

== Cast ==
- Barbara Crampton as Grace
- Booboo Stewart as Dean
- Haley Lu Richardson as Kendal
- Jacqueline Emerson as Skye
- Jon Gries as Carson
- Leo Lee as Judas
- Max Charles as Alby
- Michael Massee as Walker
- Michael McCartney as Cadiz
- Michael Welch as Gabriel
- Nicole Fox as Brooke
- Rena Owen as Claire

== Production ==
A trained dancer, Richardson performed most of her own stunts in the film. She said the producers were "half-impressed and half-worried" by her enthusiasm for the stuntwork. Shooting took place in California City, California, over the course of a month in 2012.

== Release ==
The Last Survivors premiered at the Los Angeles Film Festival on June 12, 2014. It was released on DVD in the UK on May 4, 2015, and in the US on August 4.

== Reception ==
Rotten Tomatoes reports that 75% of 12 surveyed critics gave the film a positive review; the average rating is 6.33/10. Justin Lowe of The Hollywood Reporter wrote, "Tom Hammock's conscientiously crafted feature gets great mileage from a unique setting and some strong screen performances." Bob Strauss of the Los Angeles Daily News called the film unoriginal but praised both Hammock's direction and Richardson's acting. James Rocchi of Indiewire rated it A− and wrote that it "has a stunningly well-designed sense of place". J. R. Southall of Starburst rated it 4/10 stars and, in comparing it negatively to The Hunger Games, wrote, "Taking itself too seriously without providing enough reason for the audience to follow suit, this is ultimately an interesting and pretty but rather vacuous failure."
