= Esley Hamilton =

Historic preservationist and author

Esley Hamilton is a historic preservationist and author in St. Louis County, Missouri.

== Education ==
Hamilton completed undergraduate education in English at Syracuse University in 1967, earned a master's degree in Urban and regional planning at the University of Wisconsin, and studied architectural history under Norris Kelly Smith at Washington University in St. Louis.

== Career ==
Hamilton worked as an urban planner in the Model Cities Program in East St. Louis, Illinois in 1968 and started consulting for St. Louis County Department of Parks and Recreation in 1977. In 1980 he was hired as a preservation historian, a role he held until retirement in 2015.

Through his tenure, Hamilton conducted a survey of all County historical sites and added eight districts and 30 individual places to the National Register of Historic Places, including White Haven, Tower Grove Park, Christ Church Cathedral, and Danforth Campus. He also documented historic sites throughout Missouri and Illinois.

In 2003, Hamilton led his landscape architecture students at Washington University through documenting historic titles of homes in Bennett Avenue, a subdivision of the historically Black neighborhood Hadley Township. The state preservationist office previously determined the homes as insufficiently historic for the National Register, leaving them threatened by Highway 64/40 expansion, however the argument was successfully made to preserve the homes as a part of Civil Rights history.

== Personal life ==
Hamilton was born in Pennsylvania and lives in University City, Missouri. He has sung tenor in local choirs.

== Select publications ==
- St. Louis Parks by NiNi Harris and Esley Hamilton, Reedy Press
- St. Louis: an illustrated timeline: blues, baseball, books, crooks, civil rights, and the River by Carol Ferring Shepley and Esley Hamilton, Reedy Press

== Awards and honors ==
- 2000 Presidents Award, Landmark Association of St. Louis
- 2002 Outstanding Service and Achievement Award, St. Louis County Department of Parks and Recreation
- 2005 Rozier Award, Missouri Preservation
- 2014 Historic Preservation Award, United States Secretary of the Interior.
