= Preservationist =

Advocate of saving historic buildings

Preservationist is generally understood to mean historic preservationist: one who advocates to preserve architecturally or historically significant buildings, structures, objects, or sites from demolition or degradation. Historic preservation usually refers to the preservation of the built environment, not to the preservation of, for instance, primeval forests or wilderness.

Preservationist is, however, sometimes used descriptively in other contexts, notably with regard to language and the environment.

== Other uses of the term ==
Persons who work to preserve ancient or endangered languages are called language preservationists.

- Clarification: Ethnologue, a reference work published by SIL International, has cataloged the world's known living languages, and it estimates that 417 languages are on the verge of extinction.

Preservationist is also sometimes used in the natural environmentalist field, but while the natural environment conservationist movements preserve ecosystems and the natural environment, this movement is widely known as conservation or environmentalism.

- Clarification: A key difference between the Preservationist and Conservationist environmentalist schools is this: Preservationists view the environment as having intrinsic value that should be preserved by making as little change to it as possible. Conservationists view the environment as having instrumental value that can be of help to people, and generally accept Gifford Pinchot's notion of sustainable yield: that man can harvest some forest or animal products from a natural environment on a regular basis without compromising the long-health of the ecosystem.

Preservationism has been defined by Richard Heinberg in his book Powerdown: Options and Actions for a Post-Carbon World as distinguishing survivalist groups who wish merely to survive a collapse of civilization from preservationist communities who wish to preserve as much of human culture as is possible in the event of collapse.

- Clarification: The idea of preservationist communities is part of a broader strategy in which individuals achieve independence from the centralized power grid, forming sustainable communities that could provide mutual support in the event of critical depletion of non-renewable resources.

== Notable historic preservationists ==
Some of the notable historic preservationists who are or have been advocates for the protection of the built environment include:

- Michael Henry Adams (American, Harlem historian, writer, activist)
- Simeon Bankoff (American preservationist and activist)
- Ann Pamela Cunningham (1816–1875) American pioneering activist)
- Katharine Seymour Day (1870–1964) American preservationist from Hartford, Connecticut
- Fred Dibnah (English Steeplejack, Mechanical Engineer and Preservation activist)
- James Marston Fitch (1909–2000) American architect, teacher, activist)
- Margot Gayle (1908–2008) American journalist, activist)
- Esley Hamilton (American preservationist)
- Jane Jacobs (1916–2006) American-Canadian writer, activist)
- Carolyn Kent (1935–2009) American, Upper Manhattan activist)
- Charles, Prince of Wales (British activist)
- Catherine Fleming Bruce, (1961 -) American author and activist)
- Sergio Rossetti Morosini (1953– ) Brazilian-American preservationist and activist)
- Jacqueline Kennedy Onassis (1924–1994) American activist, writer)
- W. Brown Morton III (American governmental and international historian, writer, activist)
- William J. Murtagh (American governmental historian, writer)
- Lee H. Nelson (1927–1994) American governmental administrator, writer, teacher)
- Charles E. Peterson (1906–2004) American seminal activist)
- Jan Hird Pokorný (1914–May 2008) Czech-born American architect, New York City Landmarks Preservation Commission
- Halina Rosenthal (1918–1991) American activist, Upper East Side of Manhattan)
- George Sheldon (1818–1916) American Senator, farmer, writer)
- Arlene Simon (American activist, Upper West Side of Manhattan)
- Don and Jeannett Slesnick (1943-2023) American preservation advocates and elected officials)
- John Ruskin (1819/20–1900) British art critic, watercolorist, social thinker, philanthropist)
- Eugène Viollet-le-Duc (1814–1879) French architect, theorist)
- Walter Muir Whitehill (1908–2008) American author, historian)
- Les Beilinson AIA (1946–2013) American architect, preservationist, South Beach Miami)
- L. T. C. Rolt (1910–1974) English writer, Biographer, Preservationist)
- Nancy (Boyd) Willey (1902–1998) Historic preservationist and environmental activist, saved Little Northwest creek and Barcelona Neck from development.

== Notable conservationists ==
- See List of conservationists

== Notable environmentalists ==
- See List of environmentalists

== See also ==
- Historic preservation
- Historic preservation in New York
- Language preservation
- Conservationist
- Environmentalist
- Environmentalism
