= Hadley Township, St. Louis County, Missouri =

Township in St. Louis County, Missouri, U.S.

Coordinates: 38°37′59″N 90°19′10″W

Hadley Township is a township in St. Louis County, in the U.S. state of Missouri. Its population was 34,816 as of the 2010 census.

The community was first established as workers housing in 1907 by Evens & Howard Fire Brick Co. for their African American employees due to racial segregation in the St. Louis area. When the company dissolved during the Great Depression, plots were sold to Black families who established self sufficiency with schools and gardens. The city of Richmond Heights annexed the township in 1918 and began developing commercial properties.

Residents established several successful businesses and civic institutions. The Mount Zion Missionary Baptist Church and resident Mildred Rusan led the successful opposition efforts against a bond proposal that would have displaced the community for a park in 1945.

Urban renewal and highway construction negatively impacted the community, and many development plans threatened the community in the early 2000s. In 2014, Richmond Heights approved a blight study proposal to demolish the remaining neighborhoods through eminent domain for a Menards development. In 2019, the city placed a historical marker plaque to commemorate the township and African American contributions to the area.

In 2025, former resident Margie P. Hollins released the documentary “We Bear Witness: The African American Legacy of Hadley Township, Mo.”

== Bennett Avenue Historic District ==
In 1945, Georgia and Thomas Rusan, residents of Hadley Township, purchased parcels on Bennett Avenue, just north of the segregation border. They encountered difficulties in building and fought attempts from Richmond Heights and the state highway to seize the land. They encouraged more Black professionals to purchase lots on Bennett Avenue and established a Black middle class community with doctors, educators and businessmen. Arthur Ashe lived in the neighborhood while attending Sumner High School.

In 2003, the neighborhood was threatened with destruction for Highway 64/40 expansion, but was saved following efforts of St. Louis County historic preservationist Esley Hamilton and his students.

== Notable residents ==
- Henry Hampton
- Norma Raybon
- Mae Wheeler
- Francille Rusan Wilson
