= Evens & Howard Fire Brick Co. =

Coordinates: 38.6238°N 90.2726°W

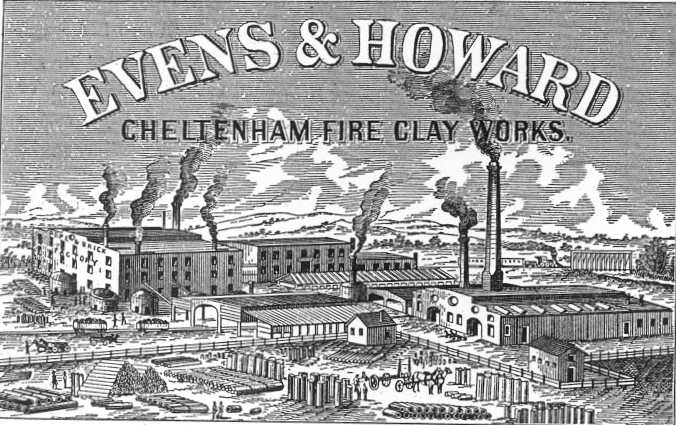
Sketch of Evens & Howard Fire Brick prior to 1904.

The Evens & Howard Fire Brick Company was a manufacturer of fire bricks, sewage pipe and gas retorts in what is now the Cheltenham neighborhood of St. Louis, Missouri. It was founded formally in 1855 as the Cheltenham Fireclay Works and achieved sales as far away as Quebec and Africa.

== History ==
One source dates the beginning of the company back to 1837, but under different owners. In 1855, the works were owned by Charles Chouteau. The firm was incorporated in 1867 when Evens & Howard took possession of it. At the time of its operation, it was one of the oldest manufacturers of fire bricks in St. Louis. At one point, its grounds covered 133 acres (54 ha). According to one report, the mining was done below ground by "pick and blast". In 1904, clay extraction took place at three mines: two in St. Louis and one in Glencoe, Missouri. The company had an extensive equipment network of cars and tracks to bring clay to the plant. Evens & Howard's offices were located on Market Street in St. Louis.

An 1875 fire consumed the brickworks, causing $50,000 in damage ($1.47 million adjusted for inflation). Parts of the sewer pipe division were destroyed by fire at least twice. In 1949, a fire that started in the factory locker room consumed two four-story factory buildings. The fire was visible as far as 25 miles (40 km) from St. Louis, attracted some 10,000 spectators, and caused an estimated $325,000 in damage ($4.4 million adjusted for inflation). One of the two buildings burned again in 1958, causing over $125,000 in damage ($1.39 million adjusted for inflation).

The company was acquired by General Refractories in 1930, which continued to operate the Evens & Howard plant under its old name.

== Richmond Heights ==
Evens & Howard were instrumental in the establishment of the African American neighborhoods in Richmond Heights, Missouri in the early 20th century. Racial segregation at the time restricted African Americans to specific portions of St. Louis County, and Evens & Howard needed workers for the nearby brickworks. They were able to convince officials to develop the neighborhoods, and many families moved in once the company built employee housing. Hadley Township, which contains Richmond Heights, was founded in 1907.

== Gallery ==
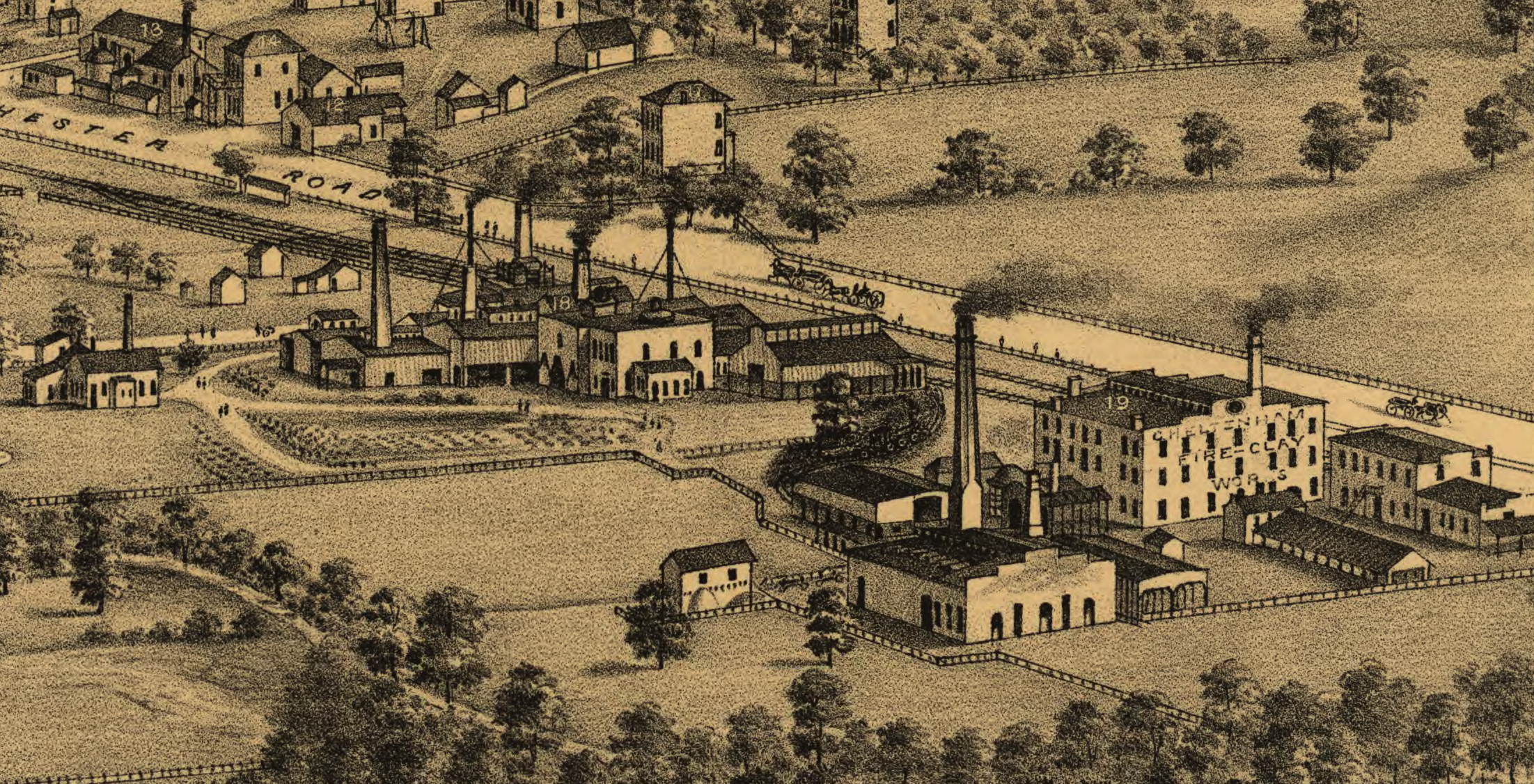
Sketch of the Cheltenham Fireclay Works in the 1870s.

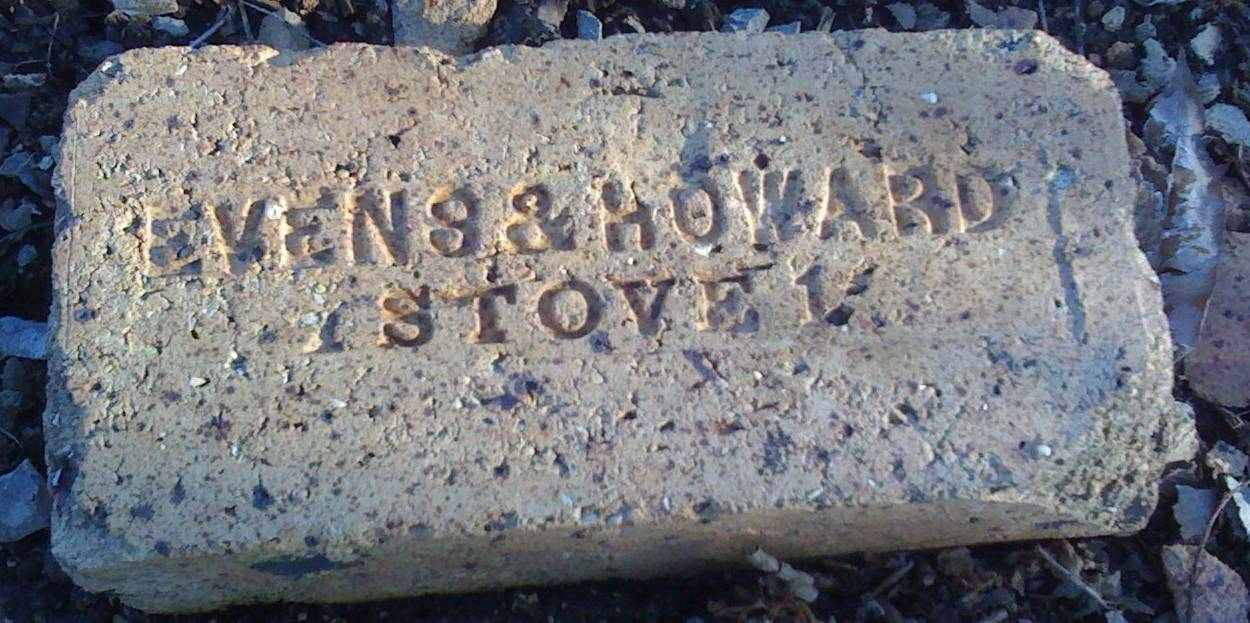
An Evens & Howard fire brick found at the Joliet Iron and Steel Works ruins in Joliet, Illinois

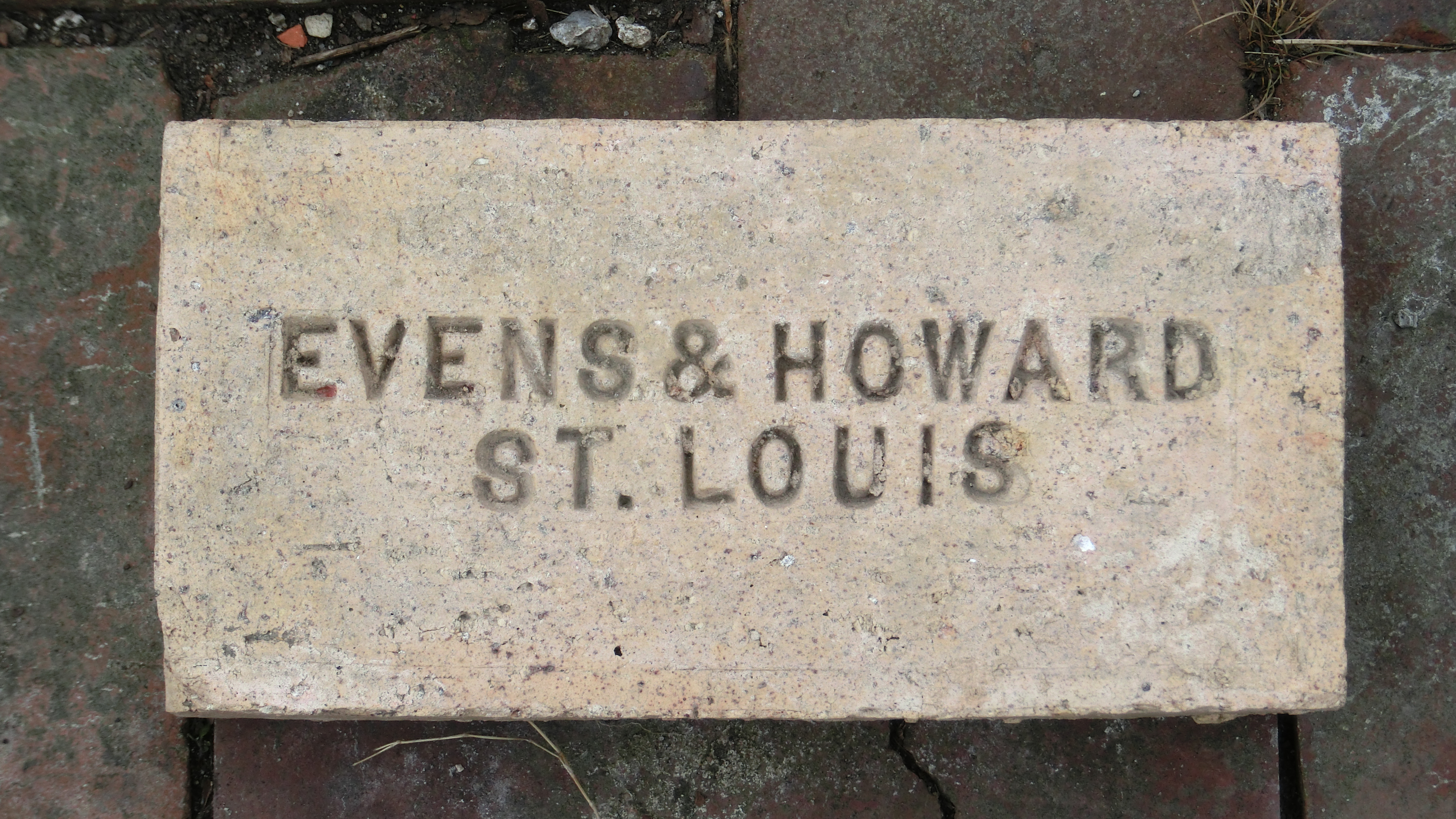
An Evens & Howard fire brick with very little deterioration
