= Devo 2.0 =

American pop group created for Walt Disney Records

- Origin: U.S.
- Genres: Children's music; teen pop; new wave; synth-pop
- Years active: 2005–2007
- Labels: Walt Disney; Warner Bros.
- Spinoff of: Devo
- Past members: Nicole Stoehr; Jacqueline Emerson; Nathan Norman; Michael Gossard; Kane Ritchotte

Devo 2.0 (also known as DEV2.O) was a pop group quintet, created for Walt Disney Records (with the participation of Devo), of child actors who sing, dance, and (in their music videos and photo shoots) mime playing instruments along to songs re-recorded by some of the original members of Devo. Jerry Casale directed all nine of the videos. Actress Jacqueline Emerson, who later appeared in The Hunger Games, was a member. The band split up in 2007 when lead singer Nicole Stoehr and lead guitarist Nathan Norman quit.

== Background ==
While the music on the album was written and recorded by Devo and merely dubbed in over footage in which the four dancing children appear to be performing, some of the members are musicians. Devo 2.0 band member Nathan Norman states they do play their own instruments with mild help from sequencers. Mark Mothersbaugh said that the band re-recorded their own music due to budgetary restraints.

An eponymous DVD and CD combo was released March 14, 2006. Two new songs, "Cyclops" and "The Winner", were written by Devo for the album. In the summer of 2006 the band began a limited series of live performances.

== Altered lyrics ==
The lyrics to some of the songs they perform have been edited to make them more "family friendly" and remove much of the innuendo and irony typical of Devo songs.

- In "Through Being Cool", for instance, the line "Eliminate the ninnies and the twits" is changed to "Eliminate the time you waste in cliques".
- The innuendo-filled "Girl U Want" is perhaps the most-changed song with all lyrics modified, and is sung by Devo 2.0's singer Nicole Stoehr as "Boy U Want".
- The song "Beautiful World" remains mostly unchanged until the end, where the words, "It's a beautiful world for you/It's not for me" have been changed to "It's a beautiful world for you/I guess me too". In addition, the bridge lyrics "Boy and girl with the new clothes on/You can shake it to me all night long hey hey" have been changed to "Boy and girl with the new clothes on/You can pose and party all day long hey hey".
- In "Big Mess" the line "I'm a boy with a gun" became "I'm a girl havin' fun".
- In "Freedom of Choice", the line "Freedom from choice is what you want" was changed to "Freedom of choice is what you want", and the line "he went in circles/til he dropped dead" became "he went in circles/til he dropped down".
- The theme of "Uncontrollable Urge" changed from social anxiety to craving snack foods, and "Jerkin' Back 'N Forth", a song about a woman saying one thing but meaning another, is now a perky song about dancing.
- The song "The Winner" is a re-recording with new lyrics of "If the Shoe Fits" by Jihad Jerry & the Evildoers. The anti-George W. Bush sentiment was replaced by a song about perseverance and thinking for oneself.

In 2010, Jerry Casale in an interview conducted by the AV Club's Sam Adams, mentioned his amusement by Disney's forced alterations, saying, "You went beyond getting mad to just like going, 'This is proof of devolution. This is it.' We thought it was really funny." In a 2012 interview, Jacqueline Emerson said that she thought the band was "made to prove the point of devolution".

== Members ==
=== Devo 2.0 ===
- Nicole Stoehr – lead vocals
- Jacqueline Emerson – keyboards
- Nathan Norman – lead guitar, vocals
- Michael Gossard – bass
- Kane Ritchotte – drums

=== Musicians (Devo members) ===
- Mark Mothersbaugh – synthesizers, vocals, guitar
- Bob Mothersbaugh – guitar
- Gerald Casale – bass
- Bob Casale – guitar
- Josh Freese – drums
- Neil Taylor – drums

== DEV2.0 ==
DEV2.0

Studio album by Devo 2.0
- Released: March 14, 2006
- Recorded: 2005–2006
- Genre: Teen pop
- Label: Walt Disney
- Producer: Devo

=== CD ===
No.	Title	Writer(s)	Length
1.	"That's Good"	Gerald Casale, Mark Mothersbaugh	3:21
2.	"Peek A Boo"	Mark Mothersbaugh, Gerald Casale	3:03
3.	"Whip It"	Mark Mothersbaugh, Gerald Casale	2:39
4.	"Boy U Want"	Mark Mothersbaugh, Gerald Casale	2:56
5.	"Uncontrollable Urge"	Mark Mothersbaugh	3:08
6.	"Cyclops"	Gerald Casale, Mark Mothersbaugh	2:48
7.	"The Winner"	Gerald Casale, Mark Mothersbaugh	2:20
8.	"Big Mess"	Gerald Casale, Mark Mothersbaugh	2:46
9.	"Jerkin Back 'N Forth"	Mark Mothersbaugh, Gerald Casale	3:03
10.	"Through Being Cool"	Gerald Casale, Mark Mothersbaugh, Bob Mothersbaugh	2:35
11.	"Freedom Of Choice"	Mark Mothersbaugh, Gerald Casale	3:14
12.	"Beautiful World"	Mark Mothersbaugh, Gerald Casale	3:26
13.	"Girl U Want (Target exclusive bonus track)"	Mark Mothersbaugh, Gerald Casale	2:56

=== DVD ===
1. "Freedom Of Choice"
2. "That's Good"
3. "Big Mess"
4. "Whip It"
5. "Uncontrollable Urge"
6. "Peek-A-Boo"
7. "Cyclops"
8. "Beautiful World"
9. "Boy U Want" (No Devo 2.0 House Version)
10. “The Winner” (Target Exclusive Bonus Video)
11. “Girl U Want” (Target Exclusive Bonus Video)

=== Other recordings ===
Devo 2.0 covered the title song from the 1965 Disney movie The Monkey's Uncle for the 2006 album Disneymania 4.
