= Jacqueline Emerson =

American actress and singer

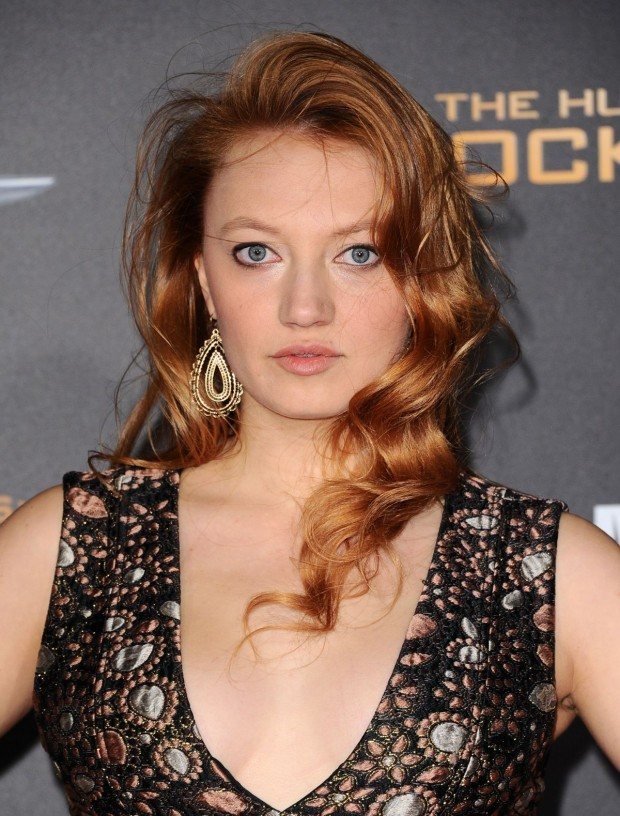
- Emerson at The Hunger Games: Mockingjay – Part 2 premiere in November 2015.
- Born: Jacqueline Bonnell Marteau Emerson; Washington, D.C., U.S.
- Other name: Jackie Emerson (Note: Jackie is her nickname deriving from her actual first name, Jacqueline. Emerson has also publicly token this nickname, also shown on her social media accounts (Twitter, Instagram, TikTok, etc.))
- Education: Stanford University
- Occupations: Actress; singer
- Years active: 2004–present
- Parents: John B. Emerson (father); Kimberly Marteau (mother)
- Musical career
- Genre: Pop
- Instruments: Vocals; keyboards
- Label: Walt Disney (2006–2007)
- Website: jackieemerson.com

Jacqueline Bonnell Marteau Emerson (Note: Jacqueline seemed to assume both of her parents surnames, her mother, Kimberly Marteau, and her father, John Bonnell Emerson.) is an American actress and singer. She is best known for portraying Foxface in the film The Hunger Games (2012). She is also known for starring as Skye in the film The Last Survivors (2014). In 2025, she co-created and starred in the Critical Role actual play series Thresher.

She is a former member of the teenage pop band Devo 2.0, which was active from 2005 to 2007. In 2011, she recorded her first single "Peter Pan", and in 2012, her song "Catch Me If You Can" was released on YouTube.

== Early life ==
Emerson was born in Washington, D.C., the eldest of three daughters of the attorney and civic leader Kimberly Marteau Emerson and the diplomat John B. Emerson, who served as United States Ambassador to Germany from 2013 to 2017.

From a young age, Emerson pursued an interest in both acting and singing, though never on-camera until she was of age. As a child and young adult, she participated in numerous radio commercials for film and television. She also performed in numerous professional productions with Reprise, the Los Angeles Opera, and L.A. Theatre Works. She attended Marlborough School in Los Angeles.

After filming The Hunger Games, Emerson graduated from Stanford University, where she studied Mandarin and Communications with a focus on Media Psychology.

== Career ==
=== Music ===
Emerson was a member of Disney's Devo 2.0 (a.k.a. DEV2.O), a Devo tribute band of teen performers. The group was assembled by Walt Disney Records with the cooperation of the original Devo, whose founders Mark Mothersbaugh and Gerald Casale re-recorded and rewrote the band's songs for the young performers. Emerson played keyboards in the project, which spawned a DVD and CD combo and was fully supported by the original Devo band members. The 2006 album DEV2.0 drew largely negative reviews. In 2007, the novelty act broke up, when lead singer Nicole Stoehr and lead guitarist Nathan Norman quit and said they would never make music again because the album flopped. Emerson continued to write songs and perform music, where she started a YouTube Channel and released the music video of her single, "Peter Pan" and in the next year, "Catch Me If You Can". She later released an acoustic song, "Glass Fire In a Jar", in which she co-wrote with Adrianne Duncan. Since then, she has released multiple other singles, and has parlayed her talents into musical theater composition

=== Acting ===
She made her television debut providing the voice for a set of Tiger Twins in the 2004 animated CGI sitcom Father of the Pride.

In 2012, Emerson made her film debut in the science fiction adventure, The Hunger Games as the District 5 tribute, Foxface. In a 2013 interview, Emerson announced that she would be working on Son of the South. She appeared in the Video ETA's list of ten up and coming stars predicted to be A-listers by 2015.

Since then, Emerson has lent her voice to projects from Disney, DreamWorks and Bethesda.

She also starred, directed, composed and created multiple shorts which now exist online, or on her website.

As an actress, she has performed in numerous films and television shows, including FBI, The Night is Ours, The Last Survivors, and The Curse of Downers Grove.

Other films she starred in include Wine Club (2024), and award-winning film Art Thief (2024). She also can be seen in the film Winter Spring Summer or Fall and is set to act in the film Kent State about the Kent State protests for Briarcliff.

In 2025, Emerson co-created the actual play limited series Thresher with writing partner Matt Linton for Critical Role, for which she also wrote the underwater setting and played the lead role of Emily Wodsworth.

== Filmography ==
=== Film ===
Year	Title	Role	Notes
2012	The Hunger Games	Foxface	
2012	The World Is Watching: Making the Hunger Games	Herself	
2015	The Night Is Ours	Olivia	Short film
2015	The Last Survivors	Skye	
2016	The Curse of Downers Grove	Eyde	
2018	Nineteen on Fire	Krista	Short film
2020	Far From Phoenix	Lydia	Short film
2021	Darby Hoskins	Darby	Short film
2023	Wine Club	Tovah	Also executive producer
2024	Art Thief	Olympia	WON - Best Actress at Orlando Film Festival
TBA	Kent State	Ruth	(pre-production)
2024	Winter Spring Summer or Fall	Robyn	

=== Television ===
Year	Title	Role	Notes
2004	Father of the Pride	Tiger Twins (voice)	
2021	FBI	Ava	Episode: "Short Squeeze"
2025	Good American Family	Rhian	Episode: "Too Hurty Without It"
2025	High Potential	Sarah	Episode: “Pawns”

=== Video games ===
Year	Title	Role	Notes
2014	Fantasia: Music Evolved	Scout (voice)	
2023	Starfield	Autumn MacMillan (voice)	
2025	Deadlock	Paige (voice)	
2026	Grand Theft Auto VI		

=== Web series ===
Year	Title	Role	Notes
2020	Wayward Guide for the Untrained Eye	Rebecca	YouTube web series
2025	Thresher	Emily Wodsworth	2 episodes; actual play limited series Setting co-creator

== Discography ==
- DEV2.0 (2006)

== Music videos ==
Song	Year	Artist	Director	Reference(s)
"Peter Pan"	2011	Herself	—N/a	—N/a
"Catch Me If You Can"	2012	Herself	—N/a	—N/a
"Glass Fire in a Jar"	2014	Herself	—N/a	—N/a
"Na Na Na (Na)"	2017	Herself	—N/a	—N/a
"Impact: The Musical (What If)"	2019	Herself	—N/a	—N/a
