= USC School of International Relations =

International affairs school of the University of Southern California

Coordinates: 34.021658°N 118.284527°W

University of Southern California School of International Relations
- School of International Relations (SIR)
- Type: Private
- Established: 1924
- Parent institution: University of Southern California
- Director: Robert English
- Location: Los Angeles, USA

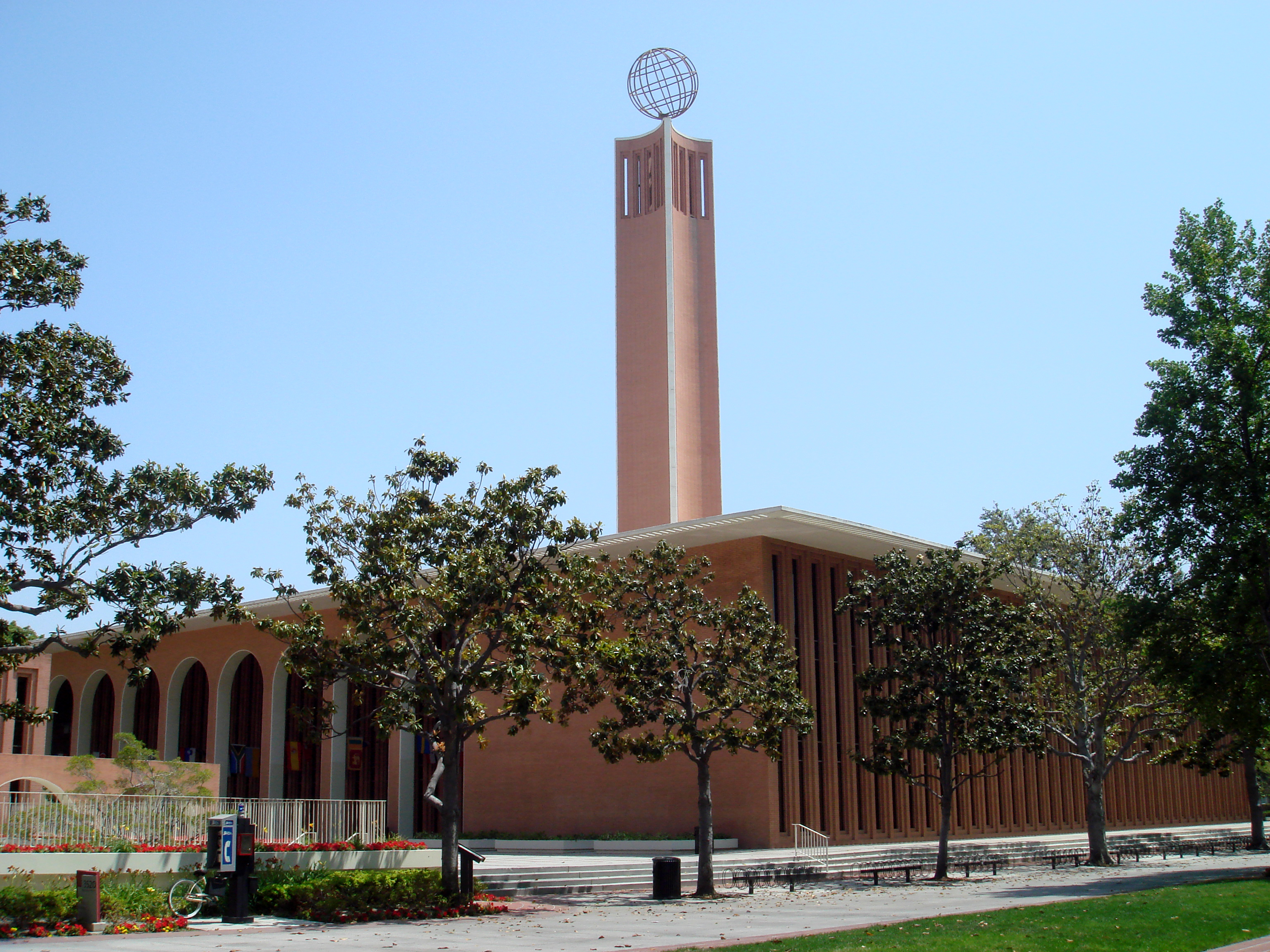
The Center for International and Public Affairs, where the School of International Relations is located on the University Park Campus of the University of Southern California.

The University of Southern California School of International Relations (SIR) is a subdivision within the USC Dana and David Dornsife College of Letters, Arts, and Sciences. The school is known for teaching, and hiring faculty who concentrate in a variety of worldviews.

== History ==
The school traces its origins to the early 1920s and then-University of Southern California President Rufus B. von KleinSmid who held a strong interest in developing the study of international relations. In 1922, USC hosted the Pan-American Conference on Education that brought together university officials from 22 countries to discuss the importance of international education and cooperation. In 1924, the Los Angeles University of International Relations was founded, to later be renamed the USC School of International Relations (SIR). The founding occurred during the liberal-internationalist reaction to World War I; during this so-called Grotian moment, many in international relations desired to end war, and thought education was the best means to that end. According to the school's website, its founding mission was "to furnish opportunities for the training of statesmen for consular and diplomatic service, of businessmen for commerce and business administration, and of teachers in departments related to world affairs in colleges and universities". The school continued to grow during the Second World War and the Cold War; during the height of the latter, SIR housed the Research Institute on Communist Strategy and Propaganda. It was one of the first schools of international relations in the country to offer a PhD, became a charter member of The Association of Professional Schools of International Affairs (APSIA), and helped to found the International Studies Association (ISA).

== Areas of study ==
SIR rankings

U.S. rankings
Foreign Policy – Undergraduate Programs	30th

World rankings
Foreign Policy – Graduate Programs	44th

For majors entering the school in 2013 or before, concentrations in the following courses were offered, of which international relations majors had to choose two:

- International Politics and Security Studies
- International Political Economy
- Foreign Policy Analysis
- Culture, Gender, and Global Society
- Regional concentrations:
  - European Union
  - Post-Soviet and Eastern Europe
  - Latin America
  - The Middle East
  - The Pacific Rim
  - Africa

For majors entering after 2013, there is no concentration requirement, though they can still choose to pursue one of the above concentrations if they wish.

== Director ==
Since 2016, the Director of SIR has been Wayne Sandholtz. Sandholtz earned his PhD and MA from UC Berkeley.

The preceding directors are Robert English (2012–2016), John Odell (2009–12), Laurie Brand (2006–09), Steven Lamy (2001–06), Jonathan Aronson (1995–2001), Robert Friedheim (1992–95), Thomas J. Biersteker (1991–92), Gerald Bender (1986–91), Michael Fry (1981–86), Jay Savage (1979–81), James N. Rosenau (1976–79), Ross Berkes (1949–76), Claude A. Buss (1935-49), and Rufus B. von KleinSmid (1924–35).

== Faculty ==
There are currently 24 permanent members of the faculty at the school. All have terminal degrees in their field, and have published numerous working papers, articles, and books.

== Affiliated programs and institutions ==
In order to further the study of international relations, the school has created a number of affiliates:

- Center for International Studies - CIS was established by the School of International Relations to promote advanced research and sustained discussion of theoretical and policy issues in international political and economic affairs.
- Center for Active Learning in International Studies - CALIS is a K-12 outreach program sponsored by the East Asian Studies Center (EASC) and the School of International Relations (SIR)
- Teaching International Relations Program - TIRP is a community outreach program operated by the School of International Relations
- USC Center on Public Diplomacy - The University of Southern California Center on Public Diplomacy is a joint academic research, teaching and training Center created and run jointly by the USC Annenberg School for Communication and the USC College of Letters, Arts and Sciences School of International Relations
