= Francille Wilson =

American historian (born 1947)

Francille Rusan Wilson
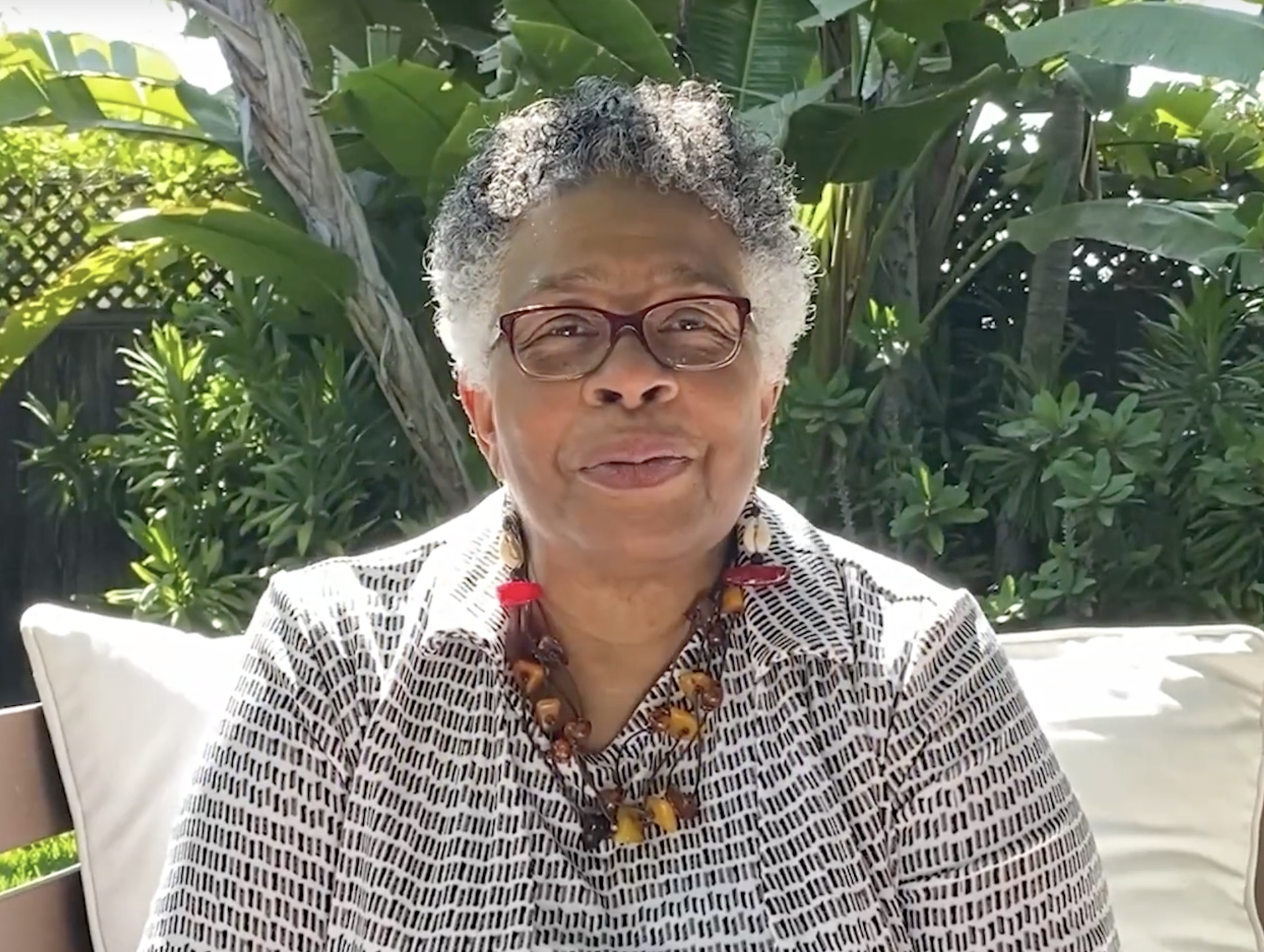
- Wilson in 2020
- Born: Francille Rusan; March 7, 1947 (age 79); St. Louis, Missouri, U.S.
- Occupations: Historian and academic
- Organization: Association of Black Women Historians
- Awards: Residency at the Center for Advanced Study in the Behavior Sciences, Fellow, CASBS 2017-2018 Distinguished Lecturer, Organization of American Historians 2003-2012, 2003-2013

Francille Rusan Wilson (born March 7, 1947) is an American historian and academic, who is best known for her research on black labor, social movements and black women's history.

== Early life and education ==
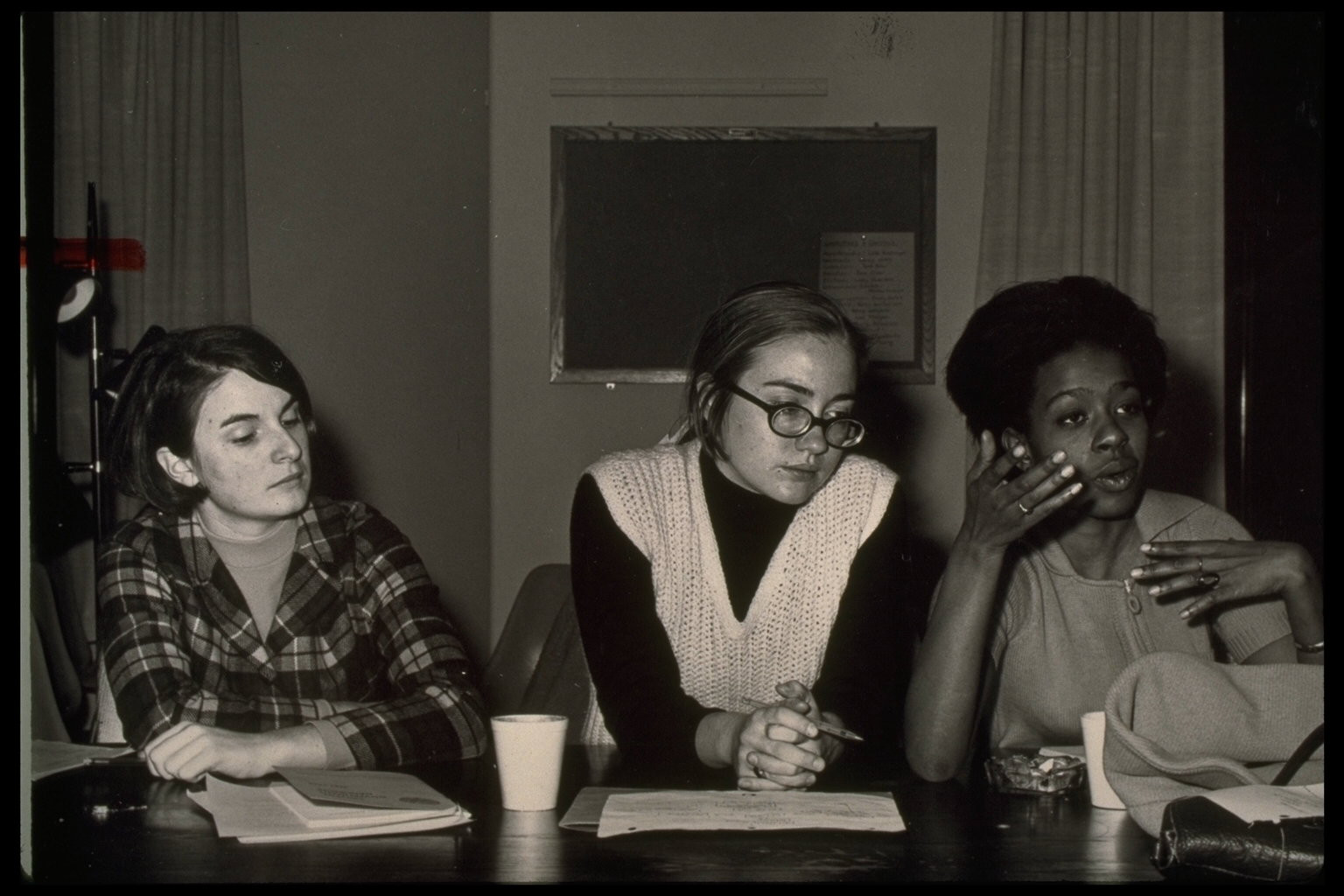
Francille Rusan and Hillary Rodham (center) campaigning for Wellesley College government president in 1968, an election which Hillary Rodham later won.

Wilson's parents, Georgia and Thomas Rusan, established Bennett Avenue, a Black middle class subdivision, during her early childhood. She attended both segregated and desegregated schools in St. Louis County, Missouri. She earned a B.A in political science from Wellesley College. During her time at Wellesley, she co-founded a black student organization called Ethos and was heavily involved in the student activist movements that is responsible for bringing black studies to Wellesley. Later on, Wilson attended Harvard University to receive a master's degree in Social Studies.

She then earned a Ph.D. and M.A in American History at the University of Pennsylvania in 1988. At the University of Pennsylvania she studied under Nell Irvin Painter. She continued her studies through a postdoctoral training at Stanford University for Advanced Study in Behavioral Sciences. She now serves on the Los Angeles Commission on the Status of Women, as well as on the state board of the California African American Museum.

== Career and impact ==
Wilson is a historian whose research focuses on social movements, black labor, black intellectuals and the history of black women. Currently, she is serving her second term as the National Director of the Association of Black Women Historians (2015-2018), while also maintaining her position as an associate professor in the departments of American Studies and Ethnicity and History at the University of Southern California.

Before joining the Departments of American Studies and Ethnicity and History at USC, Wilson taught African American studies and history at the University of Maryland, Eastern Michigan University, and the University of Michigan in Flint and Ann Arbor.

She has written multiple journal entries and one book. Her book, The Segregated Scholars: Black Social Scientists and the Creation of Black Labor Studies gathers extensive research and historical interviews to examine the lives and professionals of African American labor historians and social scientist. This particular book has been reviewed numerous times and is argued to have provided the foundation and framework for future debates on Black scholars. This book considers gender, class and the time period in which these scholars worked.

== List of Publications ==
=== Books ===
The Segregated Scholars: Black Social Scientists and the Creation of Black Labor Studies, 1890-1950.

=== Journal articles ===
- "Gertrude Emily Hicks Bustill Mossell: Her Heritage, Her Impact, and Her Legacy"
- "Becoming 'Woman of the Year': Sadie Alexander's Construction of a Public Persona as a Black Professional Women 1920–1950"
- "Our Foremother's Keepers: The Association of Black Women Historians"
- "Black Women's History at the Intersection of Knowledge of Knowledge and Power", ABWH's Twentieth Anniversary Anthology

== Awards and honours ==
Wilson received the Letitia Woods Brown Memorial Book Prize for the best book in African American Women's history for her work The Segregated Scholars: Black Social Scientist and the Creation of Black Labor Studies 1890-1950. This award was presented by the Association of Black Women Historians.

She served on the boards of the Association for the Study of African American Life and History and the Labor and Working Class History Association. In December 2007, Francille was appointed to the Los Angeles Commission on the Status of Women by the Mayor Antonio Villaraigosa. She serves as the president for the 2009-2010 calendar year.

On February 9, 2008, Wilson received the Mary McLeod Bethune Excellence in Education Award, through the Our Authors Study Club of Los Angeles. In 2011, she was appointed to the State Board of the California African American Museum by the governor for a four-year term. She has also received the Distinguished Lecturer Award from the Organization of American Historians, 2013-2012 and 2003–2013.
