= S. George Bankoff =

American chemical engineer (1921–2011)

Seymour George Bankoff (October 7, 1921 – July 14, 2011) was an American chemical engineer.

Bankoff was born on October 7, 1921, and raised in Brooklyn. He received bachelor's and master's degrees in mineral dressing at Columbia University. Bankoff then worked for the Manhattan Project between stints at DuPont. In 1948, he began teaching at Rose Polytechnic Institute and concurrently earned a Ph.D. from Purdue University. Bankoff joined the Northwestern University faculty in 1959, where he was appointed the Walter P. Murphy Professor of Chemical and Mechanical Engineering. In 1966, Bankoff was named a Guggenheim fellow. Over the course of his career, Bankoff was also granted fellowship in the American Institute of Chemical Engineers and the American Society of Mechanical Engineers, as well as a membership in the National Academy of Engineering. He died on July 14, 2011, at Evanston Hospital, aged 89.
