= Laurie Brand =

Professor of international relations

Laurie Ann Brand (born February 25, 1956) is a professor of international relations at the University of Southern California School of International Relations. Professor Brand specializes in the international relations of the Middle East, including political economy of the region and inter-Arab relations. She received her B.S. in French from Georgetown University, her M.A. in International Affairs from Columbia University, and her Ph.D. in Comparative Politics from the same institution. She served as president of Middle East Studies Association of North America in 2004.

== Publications ==
- Brand, Laurie (2006). Citizens Abroad: Emigration and the State in the Middle East and North Africa. Cambridge University Press. ISBN 0-521-85805-4.
- Brand, Laurie (1998). Women, the State, and Political Liberalization. Columbia University Press. ISBN 0-231-11267-X.
- Brand, Laurie (1995). Jordan's Inter-Arab Relations. Columbia University Press. ISBN 0-231-10097-3.
- Brand, Laurie (1988). Palestinians in the Arab World: Institution Building and the Search for State. Columbia University Press. ISBN 9780231067232. ASIN: B000GRAZBG.
