= Benjamin Franklin Award for Public Diplomacy =

United States Department of State award

Benjamin Franklin Award for Public Diplomacy is an American award by the United States Department of State which recognizes individuals, foundations, associations, and corporations that actively contribute to advancing America's ideals around the globe through public diplomacy. The award is named in honor of Benjamin Franklin because, as the nation's first envoy, he was "known for his creative ways of using culture, business and science to attract the attention of foreign audiences".

The establishment of the award was announced by US Secretary of State Condoleezza Rice in January 2007, as the most prestigious honor that the Department of State can bestow on U.S. citizens and non-governmental organizations, giving special emphasis to activities that:

1. provide hope and opportunities in the core areas of education, culture, and information
2. empower, educate, and inspire key audiences such as women, students, and educators
3. engage under-served communities and grassroots organizations.

The awards are presented in four categories:

- Individuals
- Corporations
- Academic institutions (schools, universities, etc.)
- Not-for-profit organizations (non-governmental organizations, foundations, associations, etc.)

== Benjamin Franklin Award for Outstanding Diplomatic Service ==
Prior to the establishment of The Benjamin Franklin Award for Public Diplomacy in 2007, The Benjamin Franklin Award for Outstanding Diplomatic Service was established in 1992, with recipients as follows.

Individual Awards
Year	Date	Recipient
1992	November 16, 1992	President George H. W. Bush
1994	April 25, 1994	The Honorable Michael J. Mansfield
2003	April 29, 2003	The Honorable George S. McGovern
2003	April 29, 2003	The Honorable Robert D. Stuart, Jr.
2008	May 6, 2008	The Honorable James A. Baker, III
2013	May 6, 2013	The Honorable William J. Vanden Heuvel
2013	May 6, 2013	The Honorable Keith L. Brown
2013	May 6, 2013	The Honorable Bruce S. Gelb
2013	May 6, 2013	The Honorable Henry L. Kimelman
2013	May 6, 2013	The Honorable Ogden Reid

2016

- Individual Category Winner: Eric Treene, Ehsan Zaffar, Catherine Newcombe – for their work on advancing religious freedom issues under United Nations Human Rights Council Resolution 16/18.

2008

- Non-Profit Category Award Winner: Search for Common Ground
- Academic Category Award Winner: University of Southern California
- Corporate Category Award Winner: Johnson & Johnson
- Individual Category Award Winner: Dave Brubeck

== See also ==
- Awards of the United States Department of State
