= Mexican Council on Foreign Relations =

Foreign relations of Mexico forum

Mexican Council on Foreign Affairs A.C. (COMEXI)
- Founded: November 22, 2001; 24 years ago
- Headquarters: Mexico City, Mexico
- Key people: Luis Rubio President; Mariana Campero Director General
- Website: COMEXI

The Mexican Council on Foreign Relations (COMEXI; Spanish: Consejo Mexicano de Asuntos Internacionales) was established the November 22, 2001. So far, it is the only plural and multidisciplinary forum, focused in the debate and analysis of Mexico's role in the world and the growing influence of international events on the national agenda. The council is a civic association, nonprofit and independent of government. It is financed entirely by its members' contributions

== Objectives ==
- Create a forum that brings together different sectors of Mexican society and facilitate meetings between them and their counterparts of other countries.
- Organize seminars, workshops and working meetings to exchange ideas and experiences that can be useful for those who are in charge of Mexico's international relations or those interested in that process.
- Create institutional linkages with homologous organizations in other parts of the world.
- Develop research projects about relevant issues that become tools for decision makers.

== Board ==
The President of the board of directors is Luis Rubio. Former presidents include Fernando Solana, Andrés Rozental and Jaime Zabludovsky.

== Members ==
COMEXI has among its members more than 450 personalities from various sectors and ideologies through the Ordinary Program and its three special programs: Corporate Program, aimed to leading companies; the Institutional Program, which gathers Foreign Embassies in Mexico, international organizations with offices in our country, as well as, research and teaching centers; and the Term-Member Program, created to support the development of future leaders.

=== Corporate members ===
Citibanamex	Microsoft
Chubb	Grupo Televisa
ExxonMobil	Tenaris Tamsa
FEMSA	Zimat

=== Institutional members ===
Embassy of the United States	Delegation of Quebec
Embassy of Canada	Embassy of Australia
Embassy of South Africa	Embassy of Finland
Delegation of the European Union	Iberoamericana University
Real Embassy of Norway	Embassy of Japan
Embassy of France	Embassy of India
El Colegio de México, A.C.	Embassy of the Turkish Republic
Embassy of New Zealand	Embassy of Switzerland
Anáhuac University México Norte	Center of Research on North America (CISAN-UNAM)
Embassy of Ireland	Embassy of the People's Republic of China
Embassy of Brazil	Embassy of Sweden
Embassy of Argentina	Instituto Tecnológico Autónomo de México
General Coordination on Foreign Affairs and Parliamentary Relations of the Senate	Organisation for Economic Co-operation and Development
Embassy of United Kingdom of Great Britain and Northern Ireland	Embassy of Morocco Kingdom
Embassy of Israel	National Institute of Public Administration (INAP)

== Activities ==
COMEXI has authored unpublished materials, such as the biannual survey of opinion "Mexico and the World", prepared jointly with the Centro de Investigación y Docencia Económicas (CIDE). Additionally, it published a collection of papers of the Mexican Council on Foreign Affairs which addressed important issues of international affairs.

An additional facet of the council's objectives is to participate at conferences, study groups or workshops on topics relevant to Mexico and its international partners. It has partnerships with the Council on Foreign Relations, the Chicago Council on Global Affairs, the Council of the Americas, the Pacific Council on International Policy and the Woodrow Wilson International Center for Scholars, in the United States and six Latin American Councils (Argentine Council for International Affairs, the Conselho Brasileiro de Relações Internacionais, the Chilean Council for International Affairs, the Uruguayan Council for Foreign Relations, the Paraguayan Center for International Studies and the Peruvian Center for International Relations). Additionally COMEXI signed a memorandum of understanding with the Institute Fernando Henrique Cardoso of Brazil and the Indian Council of World Affairs.

Since 2003, the Woodrow Wilson International Center for Scholars and COMEXI instituted Stays Academic Program for Research in Public Policy for researchers on issues of bilateral relations Mexico-United States. Through this, each year about three specialists conducted research at the headquarters of the Wilson Center in Washington, DC.

As of September 20, 2013, the council has been featured in radio programs and television analysis, in addition to more than 30 Members in the Press who publish in print media daily basis. The level of Associates and its deliberations in an informal and open, has increasingly become a forum to COMEXI meeting required for individuals who visit the country.

== Information Center ==
COMEXI's web site give to any who interested in the global agenda, the opportunity to explore special articles that are product of the research made by the Council in the most important organizations around the globe. The center is divided in two categories: regional and thematic.
