= Simeon Bankoff =

American activist

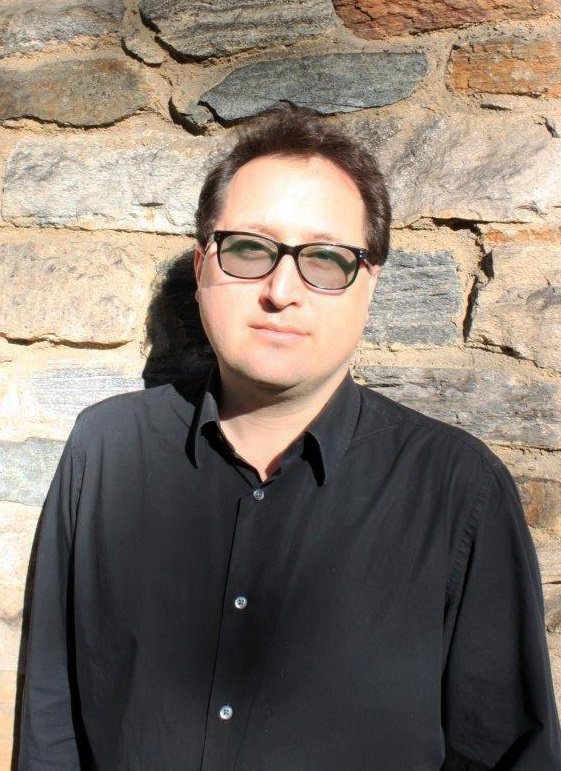
- Simeon Bankoff in 2015
- Born: October 10, 1970 (age 55); Brooklyn, New York City
- Education: Sarah Lawrence College, Pratt Institute
- Occupation: Activist
- Spouse: Hafina Allen

Simeon Bankoff is a New York City preservation activist. He served as executive director of the Historic Districts Council, a New York City, USA, not-for-profit organization, from November 2000 through 2021.

During his tenure, he positioned the Historic Districts Council at the forefront of numerous historic preservation campaigns, including the drive to save the formerly industrial neighborhoods of Brooklyn's waterfront, the protection of Lower Manhattan's unprotected historic buildings, fighting out-of-scale development along Central Park and advocating for the preservation of low-density historic neighborhoods in Queens.

He also led HDC's involvement in campaigns to preserve a number of individual buildings, such as the Trylon Theater in Queens, 2 Columbus Circle in Manhattan and the Lady Moody House in Brooklyn. In addition to helping communities throughout the five boroughs, he has also helped HDC promote legislation to help preserve New York's unprotected historic buildings as well as producing regular educational programs on history and preservation in New York City.

Previous to becoming executive director of the Historic Districts Council, Bankoff worked for a number of other historic preservation organizations in New York City, including the Historic House Trust where he worked to acquire 18th and 19th Century farmhouses for the city, and the New York Landmarks Preservation Foundation, where he helped initiate the Cultural Medallions plaque program which commemorate the residences of notable New Yorkers such as Jack Kerouac, Frank O'Hara, George Gershwin and Edna St. Vincent Millay.

A lifelong resident of Brooklyn, Bankoff holds a BA from Sarah Lawrence College and a MS in Historic Preservation from Pratt Institute.
