= Pacific Council on International Policy =

American-based nonprofit organization

- Formation: 1995
- Type: Foreign Policy Membership Organization
- Location: Los Angeles, California, USA
- President and CEO: Duncan Wood, PhD
- Co-Chairman: Richard Goetz
- Co-Chairman: Robert Lovelace
- Website: www.pacificcouncil.org

The Pacific Council on International Policy is an independent, non-partisan, membership-based organization dedicated to global engagement. Founded in 1995 in partnership with the Council on Foreign Relations and the University of Southern California, the Pacific Council is a 501c(3) non-profit organization. It is headquartered in Los Angeles, California. Its activities include events and conferences, policy-focused task forces, and international delegations.

== Organization ==
The Pacific Council is "committed to building the capacity of Los Angeles and California for impact on global issues, discourse, and policy." The Council connects a network of people from different industries to engage in foreign policy discourse and effect change on international issues. The Council convenes virtual and in-person events, roundtable discussions, and international delegations, and provides thoughtful foreign policy analysis and commentary in its online Magazine.

== Leadership ==
Duncan Wood, PhD currently serves as the Pacific Council's president and CEO. Richard Goetz, Partner at O'Melveny & Myers LLP, and Robert Lovelace, Vice Chairman at Capital Group Companies, are co-chairs of the Board of Directors, which also includes Ambassador Colleen Bell, Antonia Hernández, and Mel Levine, among others. Abraham F. Lowenthal was the founding president of the Pacific Council. Prominent members of the Pacific Council Board of Directors have included Robert F. Erburu, former chairman of the Times Mirror Co. and founding board chairman of the Pacific Council; former Secretary of State Warren Christopher, who followed Erburu as board co-chair; John Bryson, who served as co-chair with Christopher and later chair of the Pacific Council Board before his appointment as U.S. Secretary of Commerce; former Utah governor and U.S. Ambassador to China Jon M. Huntsman; and former Congressman and House Rules Committee Chairman David Dreier.

== Activities ==
The Pacific Council works with member experts and task forces to host conferences, events, and travel delegations. The council has hosted a number of influential speakers, including former Secretaries of State Hillary Clinton, John Kerry, and Condoleezza Rice, former President George W. Bush, Los Angeles Mayor Eric Garcetti, former CIA Director Leon Panetta, General James Mattis, Dr. Joseph S. Nye, foreign dignitaries, U.S. ambassadors, members of Congress, and foreign policy experts, among others.

=== Programs ===
The Pacific Council encourages thoughtful dialogue on a wide variety of international issues, but focuses on areas where it is poised to have impact both locally and globally. Examples of the council's programs are the Mexico Initiative, and the Guantánamo Bay Observer Program.

=== Delegations ===
Members often travel abroad on Pacific Council delegations, during which members meet with government officials and business leaders. Previous destinations include Mexico, North Korea, Cuba, Iraq, Afghanistan, South Sudan, Guatemala, China, and France, among many others.

The Pacific Council also organizes task forces to address international policy issues and make policy recommendations. Its U.S.-Mexico Border Security Task Force, led by former DEA Administrator and U.S. Customs and Border Protection Commissioner Robert C. Bonner, recommended that the U.S. Congress and the Obama administration renew a ban on assault weapons, and the task force released a "report card" assessing progress made on previous recommendations. The council's Climate Change Adaptation Task Force recommended that the state of California create a Climate Risk Council and reported the potential effects of climate change on the California coast.

One task force is a part of the Guantánamo Bay Observer Program. Since 2013, the Pacific Council has held official NGO observer status at GTMO, allowing Pacific Council member experts to observe proceedings at GTMO and report back to the council. Recommendations made by the council's GTMO Task Force were included in the FY2018 Defense Bill by Rep. Adam Schiff (D-CA).

== Reports ==
The Pacific Council has released numerous reports surrounding issues in foreign affairs and public diplomacy. Some of the council's previous reports include:

- A Path Forward: Advancing U.S. – China Relations Through Public Diplomacy

- Global Los Angeles

- Up To Speed: To Fairly and Transparently Expedite the Guantanamo Trials, Put Federal Judges in Charge
