= Bongwater =

Bongwater may refer to:

- Bongwater (novel), a 1995 novel by Michael Hornburg
- Bongwater (film), a 1998 comedy film adapted from the Hornburg novel
- Bongwater (band), a 1987-92 rock band
- Bong water, the used fluid from a bong
