= St. Francis College Literary Prize =

- Awarded for: Mid-career authors who have recently published their third to fifth work of fiction.
- Sponsored by: St. Francis College
- Country: United States
- Reward: US$50,000
- First award: 2009; 17 years ago
- Final award: 2019; 7 years ago
- Website: SFC.edu

The St. Francis College Literary Prize is a biennial literary award inaugurated in 2009. The prize of US$50,000 is presented to an author in honor of a third to fifth book of fiction and is meant to offer encouragement and significant financial support to a mid-career writer who has passed beyond eligibility for debut work awards. The winner is selected by a jury and invited to St. Francis College (SFC) in Brooklyn, New York, for a speech. The winner of the prize was announced from a whittled down shortlist during the Brooklyn Book Festival every other year in September; however, SFC did not offer the award in 2021 due to the COVID-19 pandemic and hasn't initiated a selection process or determined any more winners.

== Winners and shortlist ==
Blue Ribbon = winner

2019

- Jennifer Clement, Gun Love
- Tsitsi Dangarembga, This Mournable Body
- Brandon Hobson, Where the Dead Sit Talking
- Samantha Hunt, The Dark Dark
- David Joy, The Line That Held Us
- Danzy Senna, New People

Jury: Chris Abani, Kate Christensen, Ron Currie

2017

- Amina Gautier, The Loss of All Lost Things
- Mohsin Hamid, Exit West
- Adam Haslett, Imagine Me Gone
- Selah Saterstrom, Slab
- Dana Spiotta, Innocents and Others
- Deb Unferth, Wait Till You See Me Dance

Jury: Ellen Litman, Jeffery Renard Allen, René Steinke

2015

- Paul Beatty, The Sellout
- Maud Casey, The Man Who Walked Away
- Stuart Dybek, Paper Lantern
- David Gilbert, & Sons
- Marlon James, A Brief History of Seven Killings
- René Steinke, Friendswood

Jury: Sigrid Nunez, Erin McGraw, Daniel Torday

2013

- Carol Anshaw, Carry the One
- Jami Attenberg, The Middlesteins
- Tony D'Souza, Mule
- Christopher Tilghman, The Right-Handed Shore
- David Vann, Dirt

Jury: Jonathan Dee, Peter Cameron, Kate Christensen.

2011

For books published between July 2009 and May 2011.

- Kevin Brockmeier, The Illumination
- Joshua Cohen, Witz
- Jonathan Dee, The Privileges
- Yiyun Li, Gold Boy Emerald Girl
- Marlene van Niekerk, Agaat
- Brad Watson, Aliens in the Prime of Their Lives

Jury: Francine Prose, Rick Moody, Darcey Steinke.

2009

- Aleksandar Hemon, Love and Obstacles
- Chris Abani, Song For Night
- Jim Krusoe, Girl Factory
- Arthur Phillips, The Song Is You

Jury: Jonathan Lethem, Heidi Julavits, Ben Marcus, Ayelet Waldman, Michael Chabon.
