= God (sculpture) =

1917 sculpture by Morton Livingston Schamberg and Elsa von Freytag-Loringhoven

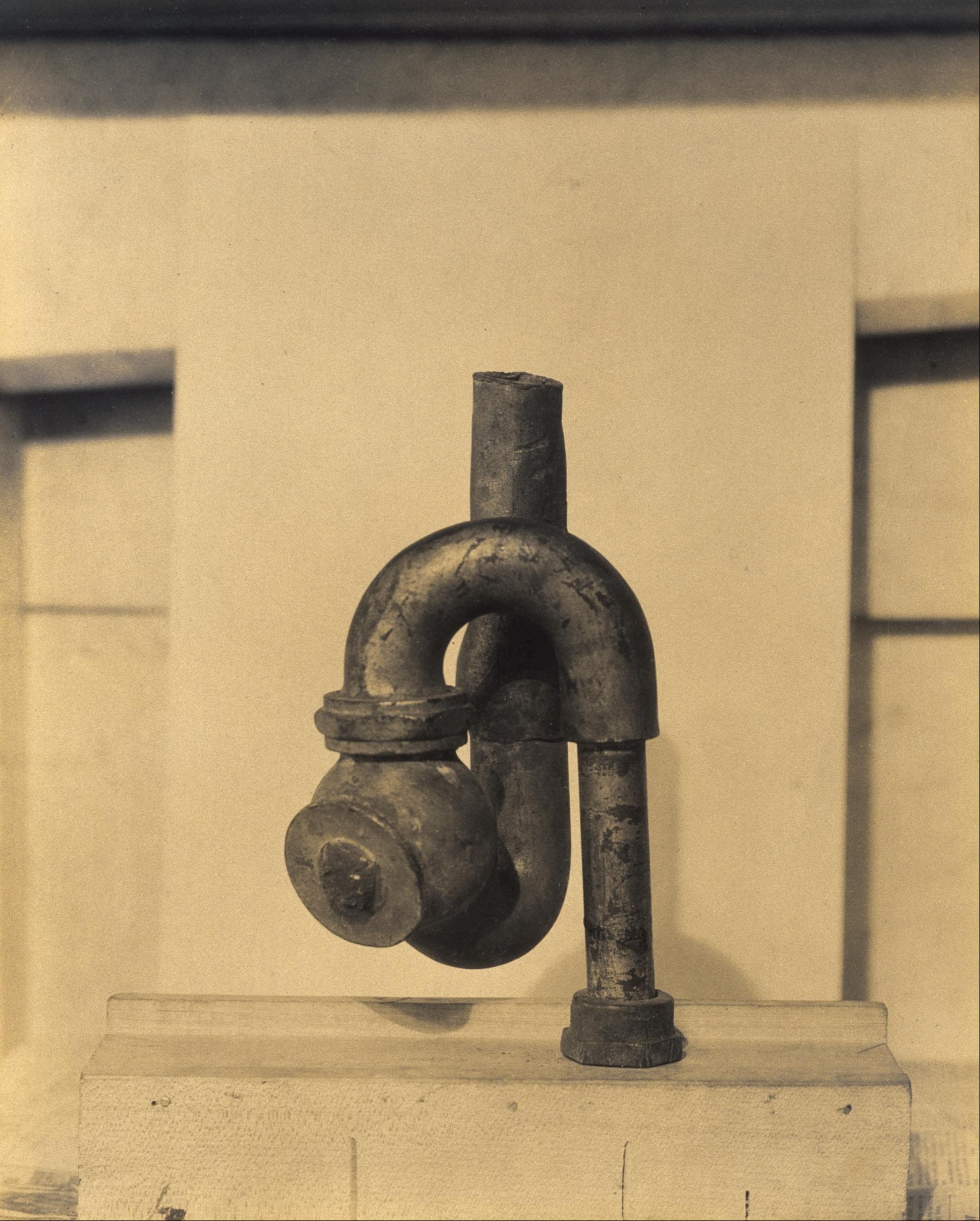
God by Baroness Elsa von Freytag-Loringhoven and Morton Schamberg

God is a circa 1917 sculpture by New York Dadaists Morton Livingston Schamberg and Elsa von Freytag-Loringhoven. It is an example of readymade art, a term coined by Marcel Duchamp in 1915 to describe his found objects. God is a 10½ inch high cast iron plumbing trap turned upside down and mounted on a wooden mitre box. The work is now in the Arensberg Collection in the Philadelphia Museum of Art.

It is now compared to Marcel Duchamp's famous Fountain sculpture which consists of an upended urinal. Both works were created in the same year and there is some uncertainty about who first had the idea of turning plumbing into art. Duchamp and the Baroness were friends and she later made a found-object portrait of Duchamp.

God was originally solely attributed to artist Morton Livingston Schamberg. The Philadelphia Museum of Art now recognizes the Baroness as a co-artist of this piece. However, according to the scholar Francis Naumann, it is reasonable to conclude, based on the works known to have been made by her, that the Baroness most likely came up with the concept of combining the two elements of the sculpture and provided the title, while Schamberg assembled and photographed the piece.
