= Elsa von Freytag-Loringhoven =

German artist and poet (1874 –1927)

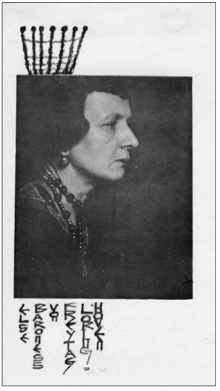
- Freytag-Loringhoven portrait, with ink decoration added by Freytag-Loringhoven, as it appeared in the September–December 1920 issue (Vol. 7, No. 3) of The Little Review (New York)
- Born: Else Hildegard Plötz; 12 July 1874; Swinemünde, Province of Pomerania, German Empire
- Died: 14 December 1927 (aged 53); Paris, France
- Known for: Poetry, sound poetry
- Notable work: Body Sweats
- Movement: New York Dada, avant-garde
- Spouse(s): August Endell; Frederick Philip Grove; Baron Leopold von Freytag-Loringhoven

Elsa Baroness von Freytag-Loringhoven (née Else Hildegard Plötz; 12 July 1874 – 14 December 1927) was a German avant-garde visual artist and poet, who was active in Greenwich Village, New York, from 1913 to 1923, where her radical self-displays came to embody a living Dada. She was considered one of the most controversial and radical artists of the era.

Her provocative poetry was published posthumously in 2011 in Body Sweats: The Uncensored Writings of Elsa von Freytag-Loringhoven. The New York Times praised the book as one of the notable art books of 2011.

== Early life ==
Elsa Plötz was born on 12 July 1874, in Swinemünde (now Świnoujście, Poland), in what was then the German province of Pomerania, to Adolf Plötz, a mason, and Ida Marie Kleist. Her relationship with her father was temperamental—she emphasized how controlling he was in the family, as well as how cruel, yet big-hearted he was. In her art, she related the ways that political structures promote masculine authority in family settings, maintaining the state's patriarchal societal order. Her discontent with her father's masculine control may have fostered her anti-patriarchal activist approach to life. On the other hand, the relationship that she had with her mother was full of admiration—her mother's craft involving the repurposing of found objects could have spawned Freytag-Loringhoven's use of street debris and found objects in her own artworks.

She worked as an actress and vaudeville performer while having numerous affairs with artists in Berlin, Munich and Italy. She studied art in Dachau, near Munich.

She married Berlin-based architect August Endell in a civil service on August 22, 1901, in Berlin, becoming Elsa Endell. They had an "open relationship", and in 1902 she became romantically involved with a friend of Endell, the minor poet and translator Felix Paul Greve (who later went by the name Frederick Philip Grove). After the trio travelled together to Palermo, Sicily in late January 1903, the Endells' marriage disintegrated. They divorced in 1906. Although their separation was acrimonious, she dedicated several satirical poems to Endell. In 1906, she and Greve returned to Berlin, where they were married on August 22, 1907.

By 1909, Greve was in deep financial trouble. With his wife's help, he staged a suicide and departed for North America in late July 1909. In July 1910, Elsa joined him in the United States, where they operated a small farm in Sparta, Kentucky, not far from Cincinnati. Greve suddenly deserted her in 1911 and went west to a bonanza farm near Fargo, North Dakota, and to Manitoba in 1912. There are no records of a divorce from Greve. Elsa started modeling for artists in Cincinnati, and made her way east via West Virginia and Philadelphia, and then she married her third husband, the German Baron Leopold von Freytag-Loringhoven (son of Hugo von Freytag-Loringhoven), in November 1913 in New York. At that time Elsa began to make sculptures out of found and discarded objects. She later became known as "the dadaist Baroness Elsa von Freytag-Loringhoven".

== Work ==
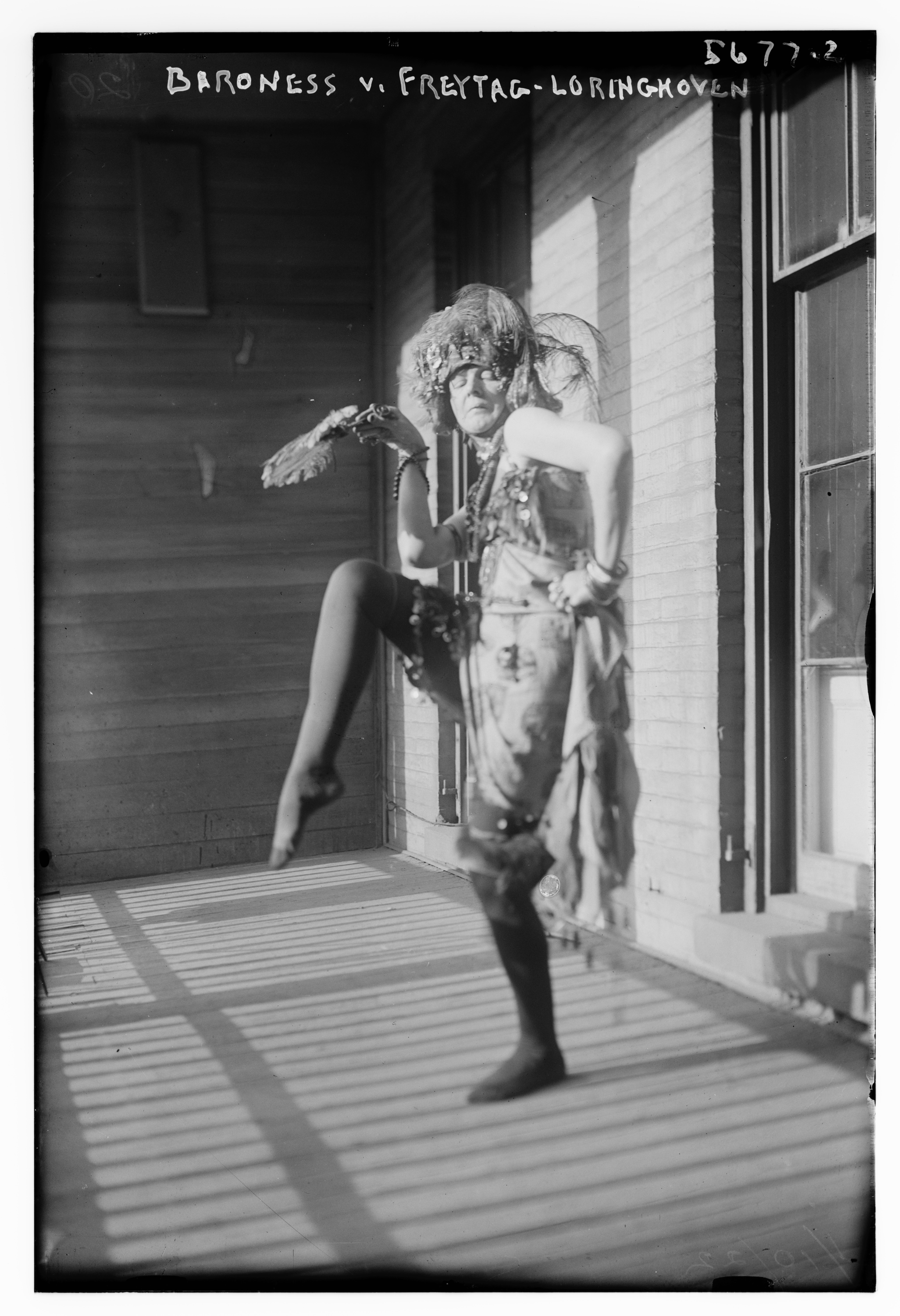
Elsa von Freytag-Loringhoven

In New York City, Freytag-Loringhoven supported herself by working in a cigarette factory and by posing as a model for artists such as Louis Bouché, George Biddle, and Theresa Bernstein. She appeared in photographs by Man Ray, George Grantham Bain and others.

=== Poetry ===
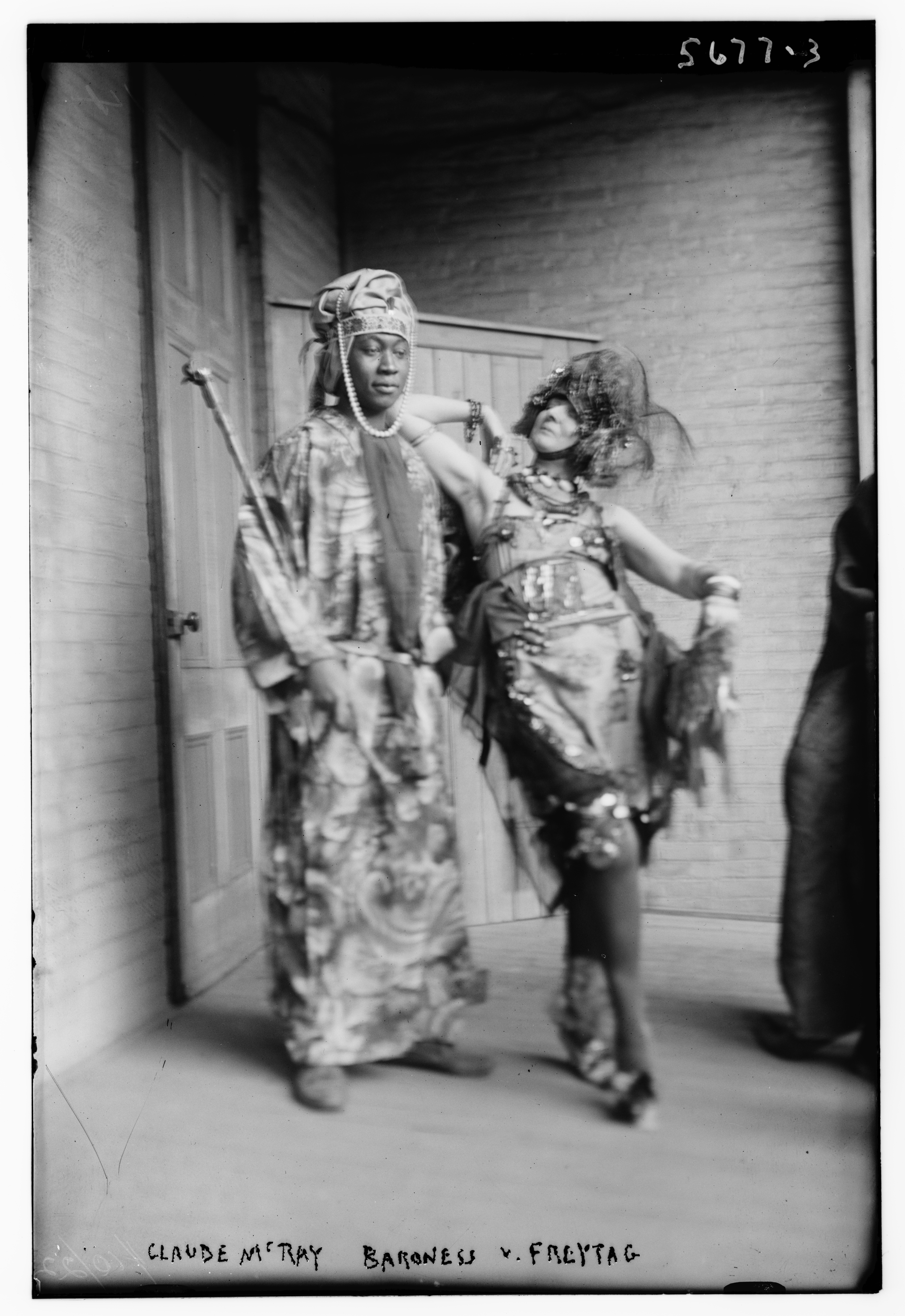
Claude McRay (i.e. McKay) and Baroness von Freytag-Loringhoven

Freytag-Loringhoven was given a platform for her poetry in The Little Review, where, starting in 1918, her work was featured alongside chapters of James Joyce's Ulysses. Jane Heap considered Freytag-Loringhoven "the first American dada." She was an early pioneer of sound poetry, but also made creative use of the dash, while many of her portmanteau compositions, such as "Kissambushed" and "Phalluspistol," present miniature poems. Most of her poems remained unpublished until the publications of Body Sweats. Her personal papers were preserved after her death by her editor, literary agent, artistic collaborator, and lover Djuna Barnes. The University of Maryland Libraries acquired a collection of her work with the papers of Barnes in 1973 and subsequently separated von Freytag-Lorninghoven's papers and treated them as an individual collection. The collection contains correspondence, visual poems, and other artistic/literary works by the artist. The University of Maryland's special collections has an extensive digital archive of her manuscripts.

=== Collage, assemblage and performance ===
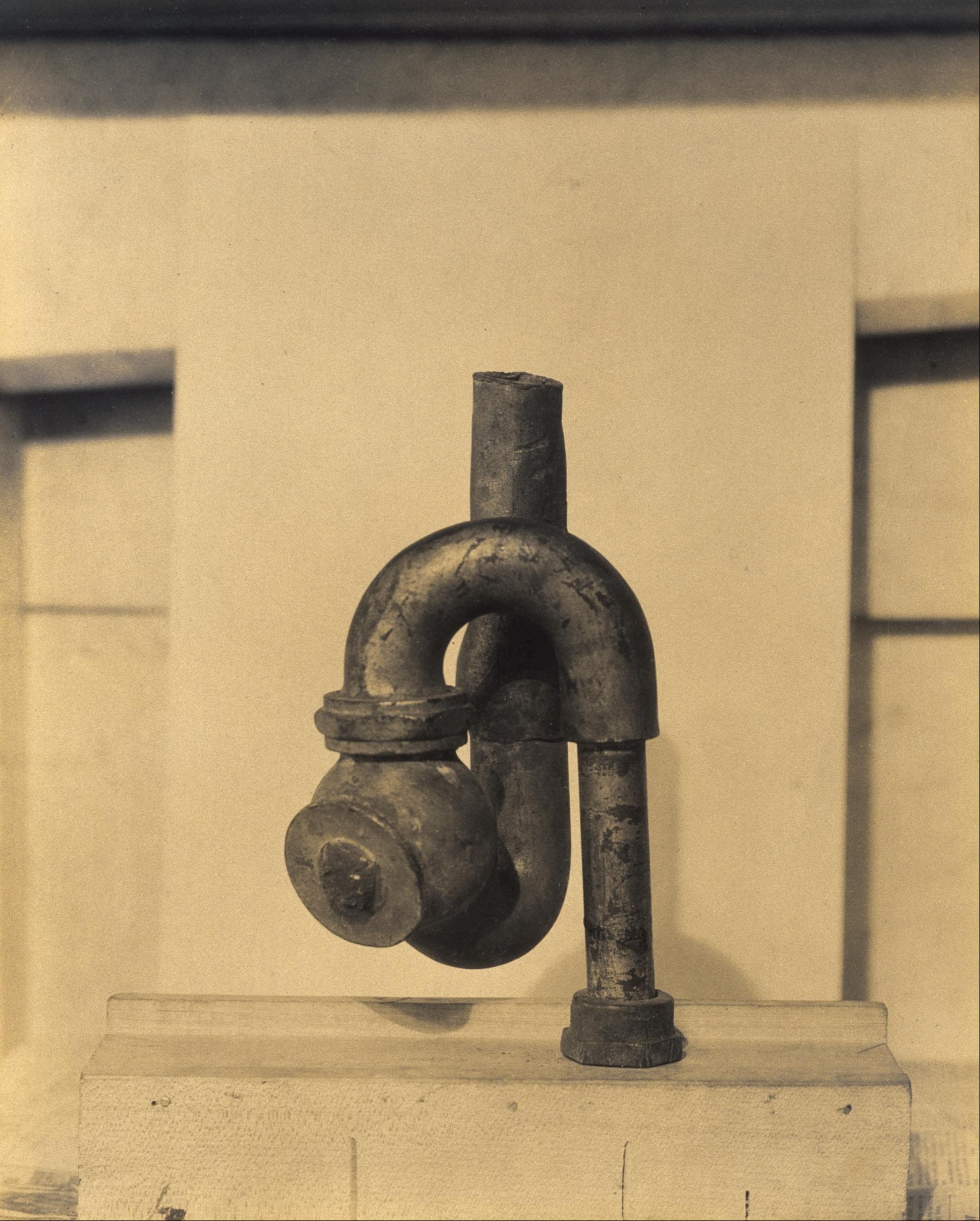
God (1917), by Baroness Elsa von Freytag-Loringhoven and Morton Livingston Schamberg, gelatin silver print, Museum of Fine Arts, Houston

In New York, Freytag-Loringhoven also worked on assemblage, sculptures and paintings, creating art out of the rubbish she collected from the streets. She was known to construct elaborate costumes from found objects, creating a "kind of living collage" that erased the boundaries between life and art.

Scholar Eliza Jane Reilly argues that Freytag-Loringhoven's elaborate costumes both critiqued and challenged the bourgeois notions of feminine beauty and economic worth. She adorned herself with utilitarian objects like spoons, tin cans, and curtain rings, as well as street debris that she came across.

Freytag-Loringhoven's use of her own body as a medium was deliberate, to transform herself into a specific type of spectacle—one that women who complied to the constraints of femininity of the time would be humiliated to embody. By doing so, she controlled and established agency over the visual access to her own nudity, unhinged the presentational expectations of femininity by appearing androgynous, drew upon ideas of women's selfhood and sexual politics, and provided emphasis on her anti-consumerism and anti-aestheticism outlooks. She included her body's smells, perceived imperfections, and leakages in her body art. Irene Gammel argues that the placement of her raw personal body/self in public space could be described as a type of Irrational Modernism.

In a performance of these ideals sometime between 1915-1916 in New York City, von Freytag-Loringhoven took a gifted newspaper clipping of Marcel Duchamp's Nude Descending a Staircase to rub over her own nude body while reciting a love poem as an ode to the artist of the original painting. This performance was not only a public proclamation of her romantic feelings for Duchamp at that time, but transformative due to this act turning the working artist-model into an artist in her own right. Freytag-Loringhoven's body art was a form of dadaist performance art and activism.

Few artworks by Freytag-Loringhoven exist today. Several known found object works include Enduring Ornament (1913), Earring-Object (1917–1919), Cathedral (c. 1918) and Limbswish (c. 1920). Rediscovered by the Whitney Museum in New York City in 1996, her Portrait of Marcel Duchamp (1920–1922) is another example of her assemblages. The sculpture God (1917) had for a number of years been solely attributed to the artist Morton Livingston Schamberg. The Philadelphia Museum of Art, which collection includes God, now credits Freytag-Loringhoven as a co-author of this piece. Although Amelia Jones suggested that this artwork's concept and title was created by the baroness, it was likely constructed by both Schamberg and Freytag-Loringhoven. This sculpture, God, involved a cast iron plumbing trap and a wooden mitre box, assembled in a phallic-like manner. Her concept behind the shape and choice of materials is indicative of her commentary on the worship and love that Americans have for plumbing that trumps all else; additionally, it is revealing of Freytag-Loringhoven's rejection of technology.

=== Fountain (1917) ===
The sculpture Fountain (1917), by Marcel Duchamp has been speculatively attributed to Freytag-Loringhoven. This has been claimed to be supported by a "great deal of circumstantial evidence." The speculation is largely based on a letter written by Marcel Duchamp to his sister Suzanne (dated April 11, 1917) where he refers to the famous ready-made: "One of my female friends under a masculine pseudonym, Richard Mutt, sent in a porcelain urinal as a sculpture." Literary historian Irene Gammel suggested in 2002 that the "female friend" in question was Freytag-Loringhoven. Duchamp never identified his female friend, but three candidates have been proposed: an early appearance of Duchamp's female alter ego Rrose Sélavy, Elsa von Freytag-Loringhoven, or Louise Norton (a close friend of Duchamp, later married to the avant-garde French composer Edgard Varèse, who contributed an essay to The Blind Man defending Fountain, and whose address is discernible on the paper entry ticket in the Stieglitz photograph). "Duchamp wrote 'sent' not 'made', and his words do not indicate that he was implying that someone else was the work's creator." The piece is a ready-made apart from the signature.

== Death ==
In 1923, Freytag-Loringhoven went back to Berlin, expecting better opportunities to make money, but instead found an economically devastated post-World War I Germany. Despite her difficulties in the Weimar Republic, she remained in Germany, penniless and on the verge of insanity. Several friends in the expatriate community, in particular Bryher, Djuna Barnes, Berenice Abbott, and Peggy Guggenheim, provided emotional and financial support.

Freytag-Loringhoven's mental stability steadily improved when she moved to Paris. She died on 14 December 1927 of gas suffocation. She may have forgotten to turn the gas off; someone else may have turned it on; or it may have been an intentional act. She is buried in Père Lachaise Cemetery, Paris.

In 1943, Freytag-Loringhoven's work was included in Guggenheim's show Exhibition by 31 Women at the Art of This Century gallery in New York.

== Biographies ==
Freytag-Loringhoven was one of the "characters, one of the terrors of the district," wrote her first biographer Djuna Barnes, whose book remained unfinished. In Irrational Modernism: A Neurasthenic History of New York Dada, Amelia Jones provides a revisionist history of New York Dada, expressed through the life and works of Freytag-Loringhoven. The 2002 biography Baroness Elsa: Gender, Dada and Everyday Modernity, by Irene Gammel, makes a case for Freytag-Loringhoven's artistic brilliance and avant-garde spirit. The book explores her personal and artistic relationships with Djuna Barnes, Berenice Abbott, and Jane Heap, as well as with Duchamp, Man Ray, and William Carlos Williams. It shows Freytag-Loringhoven breaking every erotic boundary, reveling in anarchic performance, but the biography also presents her as Elsa's friend Emily Coleman saw her, "not as a saint or a madwoman, but as a woman of genius, alone in the world, frantic."

In 2013, the artists Lily Benson and Cassandra Guan released The Filmballad of Mamadada, an experimental biopic on Freytag-Loringhoven. The story of Freytag-Loringhoven's life was told through contributions from over 50 artists and filmmakers. The film premiered at Copenhagen International Documentary Festival and was described as a, "playful and chaotic experiment that posits a return to a grand collective narrative via the postqueer populism of YouTube and crowdsourcing," by Art Forum.

== Cultural references ==
The novel Holy Skirts, by René Steinke, titled after Freytag-Loringhoven's poem "Holy Skirts" and a finalist for the 2005 National Book Award, is based on the life of Freytag-Loringhoven. She also appears in Siri Hustvedt's 2019 novel Memories of the Future as "an insurrectionist inspiration for [Hustvedt's] narrator."

In August 2002, actress Brittany Murphy dressed as Freytag-Loringhoven in a photoshoot session for The New York Times.

In 2019, graphic designer Astrid Seme published Baroness Elsa's em dashes. An anthology of dashing in print, poetry and performance. The book zooms into the pointed use of em dashes in the poems of Freytag-Loringhoven and shows her work in conversation with the likes of well-known dashers such as Gertrude Stein, Laurence Sterne, Heinrich von Kleist or Emily Dickinson.

In 2022 there was a group exhibition dedicated to Freytag-Loringhoven at Mimosa House in London. The Baroness, curated by Daria Khan, featured some of Freytag-Loringhoven's own works, including Cathedral and Enduring Ornament, which were accompanied by contemporary artist contributions inspired by her.

Dutch artist Barbara Visser explored Freytag-Loringhoven's life and art, the question of Fountain's attribution, as well as broader themes of authenticity, imitation, and authorship in a film in 2023 and a corresponding installation at Kunsthaus Zürich in 2024 curated by Simone Gehr, both titled Alreadymade.

== See also ==
- List of German women artists
- Portrait of Marcel Duchamp
