= René Steinke =

René Steinke or Rene Steinke is the name of:

- René Steinke (actor), a German actor
- René Steinke (author), an American novelist
