= The Curse of Downers Grove =

2014 film by Derick Martini

- Poster art
- Directed by: Derick Martini
- Written by: Bret Easton Ellis
- Based on: Downers Grove by Michael Hornburg
- Produced by: Jason Dubin; Oren Segal; Chiara Trento
- Starring: Bella Heathcote; Penelope Mitchell; Lucas Till; Kevin Zegers; Helen Slater; Tom Arnold
- Cinematography: Frank Godwin
- Edited by: Kayla Pagliarini
- Music by: Matthew Margeson
- Distributed by: Eagle Films
- Release date: August 21, 2015
- Country: United States
- Language: English
- Budget: $2 million

The Curse of Downers Grove is an American thriller film written by Bret Easton Ellis. Based on the 1999 novel Downers Grove by Michael Hornburg, the film stars Kevin Zegers, Bella Heathcote, Penelope Mitchell, Lucas Till, Zane Holtz, Helen Slater, and Tom Arnold. The film received a limited theatrical release on August 21, 2015, and a subsequent DVD/Blu-Ray release on September 1, 2015.

== Plot ==
Set in Downers Grove, Illinois, a suburb of Chicago, the film is a teen angst thriller set in a high school gripped by an apparent curse that claims the life of a senior every year. The story follows the lives of two seniors: Chrissie, who is skeptical of the curse, and Tracy, who believes that she may be the next victim.

== Cast ==
- Bella Heathcote as Chrissie
- Penelope Mitchell as Tracy
- Lucas Till as Bobby
- Zane Holtz as Guy
- Kevin Zegers as Chuck
- Mark L. Young as Ian
- Helen Slater as Chrissy's mother
- Tom Arnold as Chuck's father
- Jacqueline Emerson as Eyde
- Marcus Giamatti as Rich
- Martin Spanjers as David
- David Jason Perez as Jason
- Sherilyn Henderson as Monica Chase
- Joel Michael Kramer as Ryan
- Jeff Staron as Ezra
- Travis Nelson as Hunter
- Sean A. Rosales as Mike

== Production ==
=== Filming ===
Principal photography began on March 10, 2013, and lasted for 25 days. Filming primarily took place throughout Pomona, California, including the historic Lincoln Park neighborhood. It is the first feature film to take advantage of an expansion of the studio zone resulting in the availability of Pomona.

=== Music ===
The film's music was composed by Matthew Margeson, who previously co-scored Kick-Ass 2 with Henry Jackman.

== Reception ==
On the review aggregator website Rotten Tomatoes, 9% of 11 critics' reviews are positive. Metacritic, which uses a weighted average, assigned the film a score of 31 out of 100, based on 7 critics, indicating "generally unfavorable" reviews.
