= Morton Livingston Schamberg =

American painter

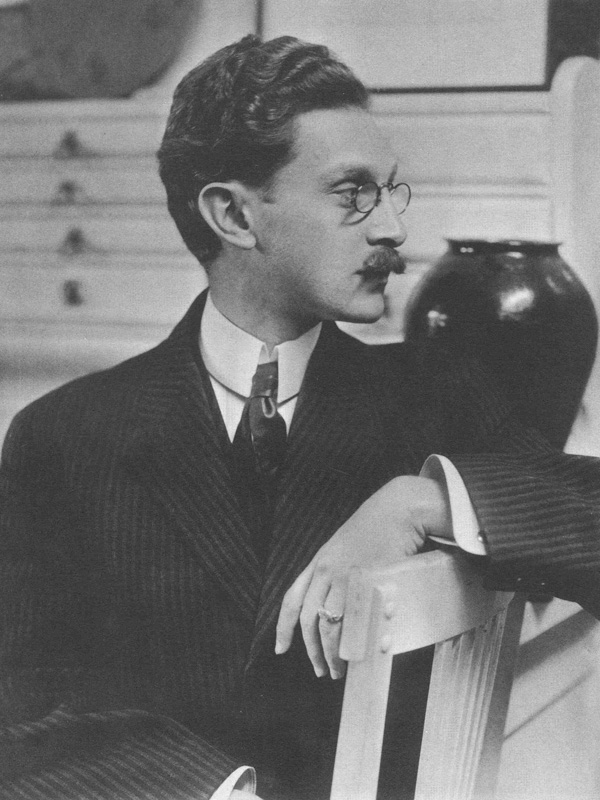
Self-portrait by Morton Schamberg, c. 1913.

Morton Livingston Schamberg (October 15, 1881 – October 13, 1918) was an American modernist painter and photographer. He was one of the first American artists to explore the aesthetic qualities of industrial subjects. Schamberg is considered a pioneer of the Precisionism art movement, and one of the first American adopters of Cubist style.

== Early life and education ==
Schamberg was born in Philadelphia on October 15, 1881. He was the youngest child in a German Jewish family. His German-born father, Henry, was a cattle dealer; his mother (born in Pennsylvania) died when he was a child.

Schamberg graduated from Philadelphia's Central High School. He earned a degree in architecture from the University of Pennsylvania in 1903. In 1902, however, he had discovered an interest in art when he attended a class taught by William Merritt Chase in the Netherlands. He took another class with Chase during the summer of 1903, in England, and then studied under him for three years at the Pennsylvania Academy of the Fine Arts. It was through Chase's classes that he met fellow student Charles Sheeler, who would be his close friend for the rest of his life.

Schamberg met up with Sheeler in Italy in 1908 and together they studied works of the Renaissance masters. Schamberg moved on to Paris later that year, where he became an associate of Leo and Gertrude Stein's circle of avant-garde artists and writers. Schamberg's earliest works were heavily influenced by Chase. After studying the works of European artists in Paris, however, his style shifted to modernism, with influences from Cézanne, Matisse, and Picasso evident in his works created between 1909 and 1912. He returned to Philadelphia in mid-1909, and he and Sheeler rented studios in the same downtown building as well as a farmhouse in rural Bucks County for use on weekends and during the summer.

== Career ==
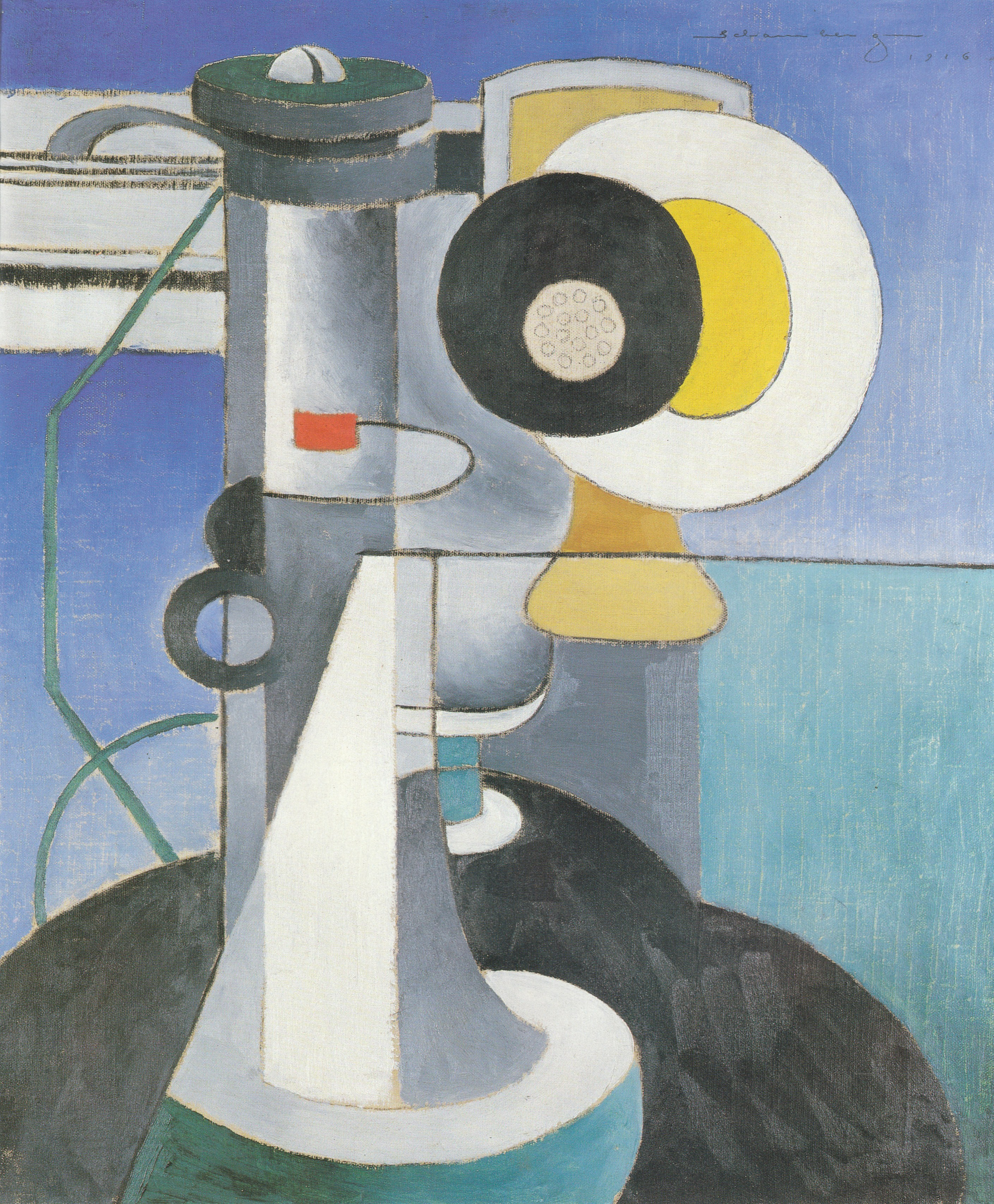
Telephone (1916). Oil on canvas, Columbus Museum of Art.

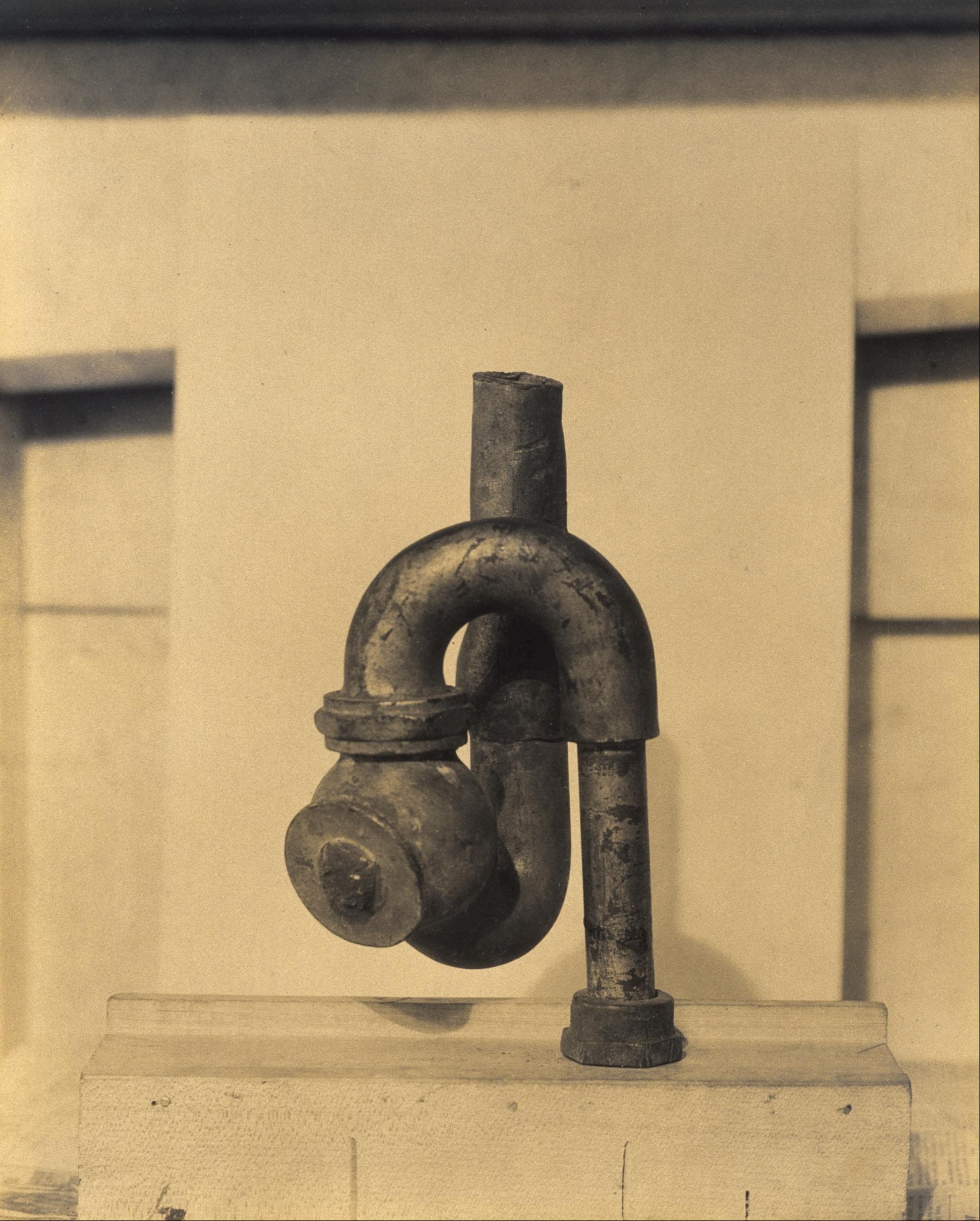
God (1917), Dada sculpture by Schamberg and Baroness Elsa von Freytag-Loringhoven, photographed by Schamberg

Schamberg had his first solo art show in mid-1910, at the McClees Galleries in Philadelphia. The show included his early landscapes and some of his larger scale portraits; these were mostly of his friend Fanette Reider and were painted between 1908 and 1912. Around 1912, he began working as a photographer to earn money, initially as a portraitist before focusing on urban architecture. Schamberg participated in the landmark 1913 Armory Show in New York, showing five of his modernist paintings.

By 1915, Schamberg began painting mechanical forms, possibly through the influence of New York Dada artists such as Marcel Duchamp and Francis Picabia. These late paintings ranged from precise illustrations to variants on Cubist, Fauvist and Futurist styles. The only sculptural work credited to Schamberg that reflects a 'pure' Dadaist sensibility is the assemblage God, but this attribution has been questioned by art historians who believe he photographed it, but that it was a collaboration with Baroness Elsa von Freytag-Loringhoven.

Schamberg was a pacifist, and his distress over World War I ultimately caused him to drop the subject of machines to work in watercolors, only one of which has survived: a still life of a bowl of flowers. An associate of art collector Walter Conrad Arensberg, Schamberg exhibited a painting and a drawing in the first show of Arensberg's Society of Independent Artists, in 1917.

== Death ==
Schamberg died October 13, 1918, in the 1918 flu pandemic. He was buried on October 15, which would have been his 37th birthday. He had been living in a Philadelphia hotel with his father, who also died in the pandemic.

== Exhibitions ==
- Paintings by Morton L. Schamberg (1881-1918), Pennsylvania Academy of the Fine Arts, Philadelphia, November 21 - December 24, 1963
- Morton L. Schamberg (1881-1918), Zabriskie Gallery, New York City, January 6–25, 1964
- Morton Livingston Schamberg (1881-1918), Salander-O'Reilly Galleries, New York City, November 3 - December 31, 1982. Toured January 22, 1983 - March 27, 1984, to Columbus Museum of Art, Columbus, Ohio; Pennsylvania Academy of the Fine Arts, Philadelphia; Milwaukee Art Museum, Milwaukee, Wisconsin.
- Charles Sheeler's Contemporaries, the Metropolitan Museum of Art, New York, June 3 - August 17, 2003 (included works by Schamberg).

== Gallery ==
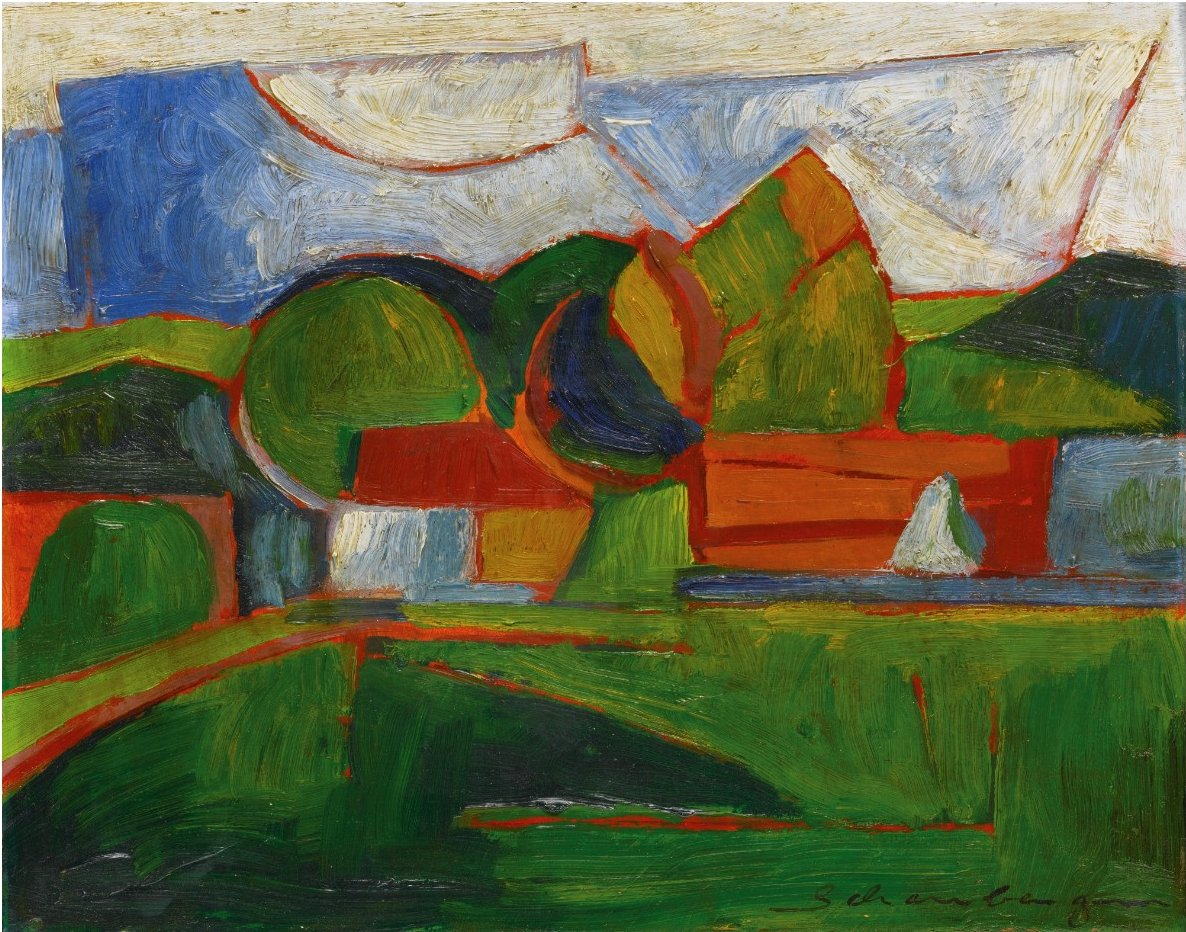
Abstract Landscape, c. 1910–1913

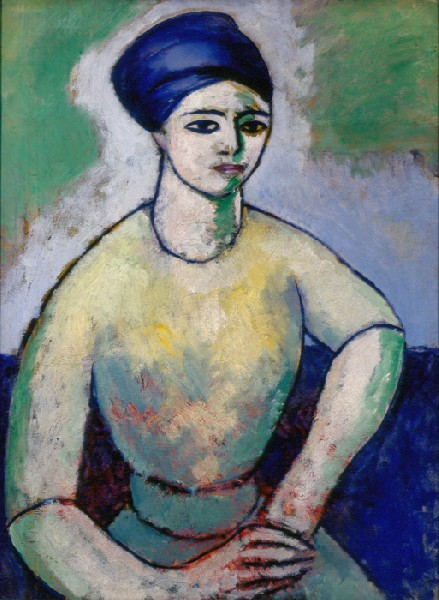
Study of a Girl (Fanette Reider), c. 1911

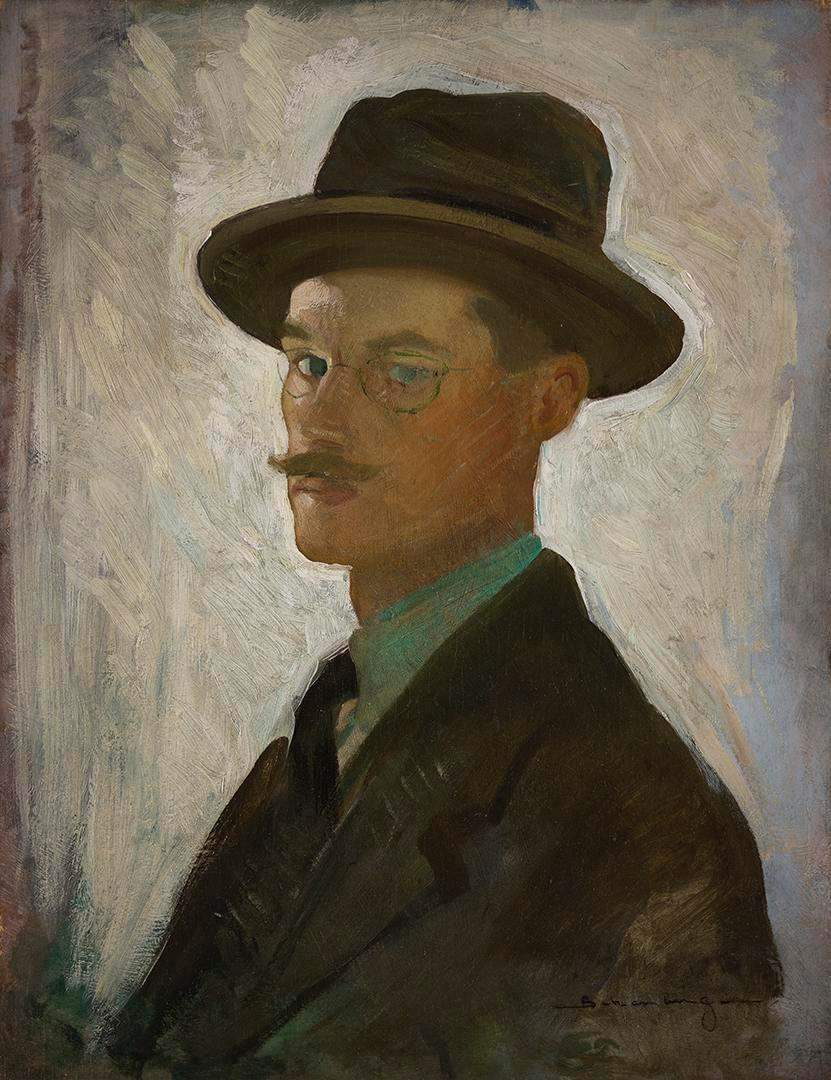
Self Portrait, c. 1911

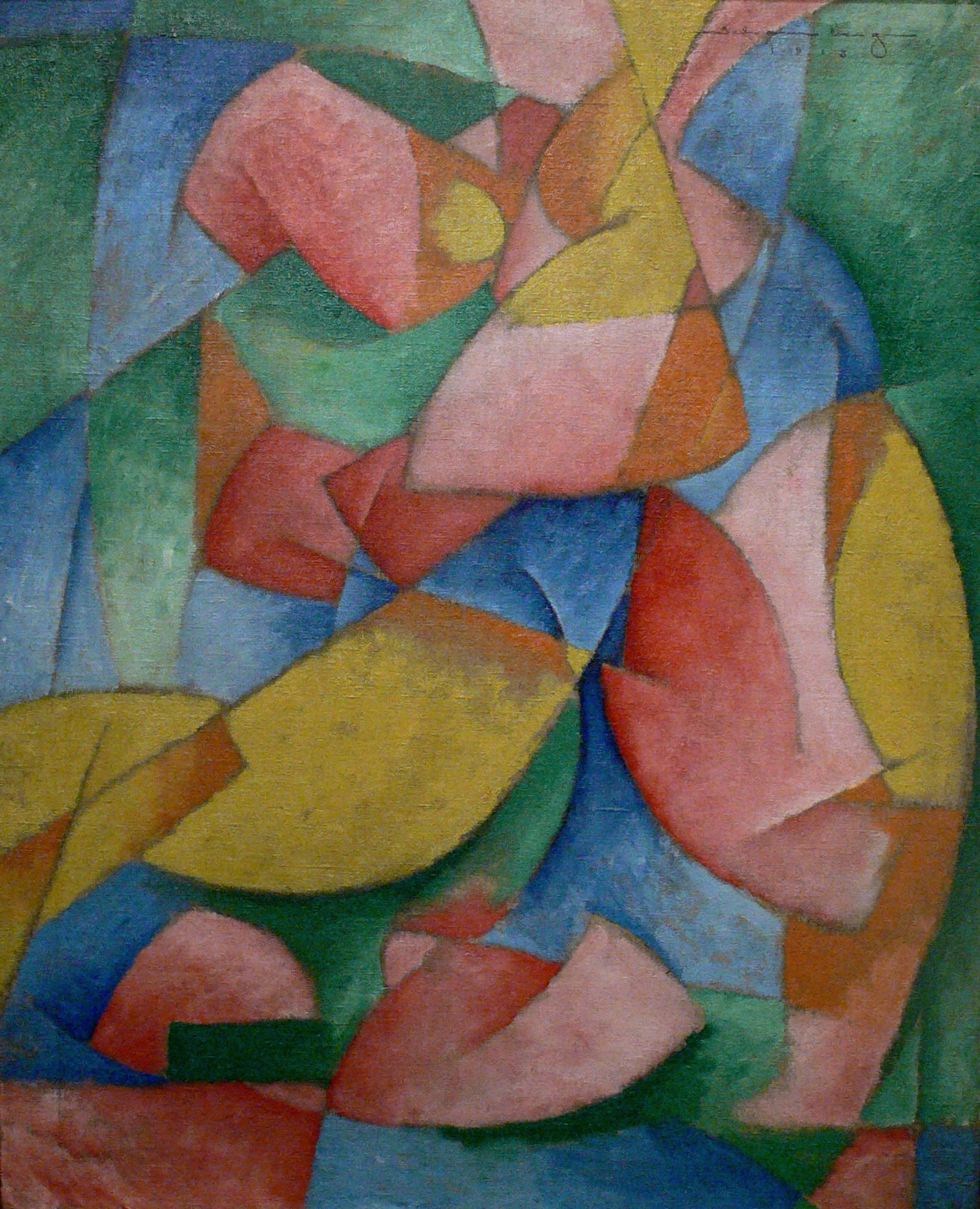
Figure, 1913

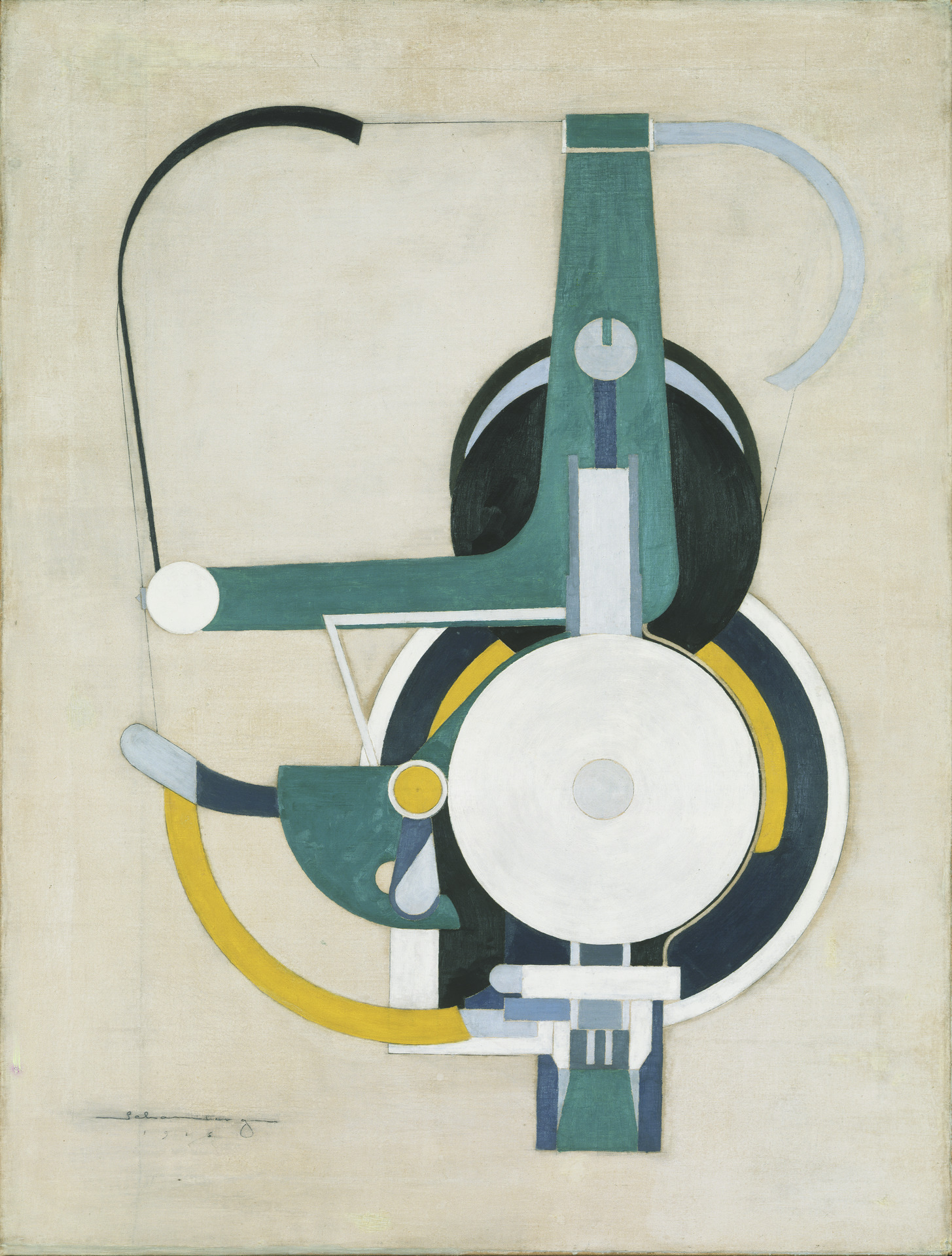
Painting (formerly Machine), 1916

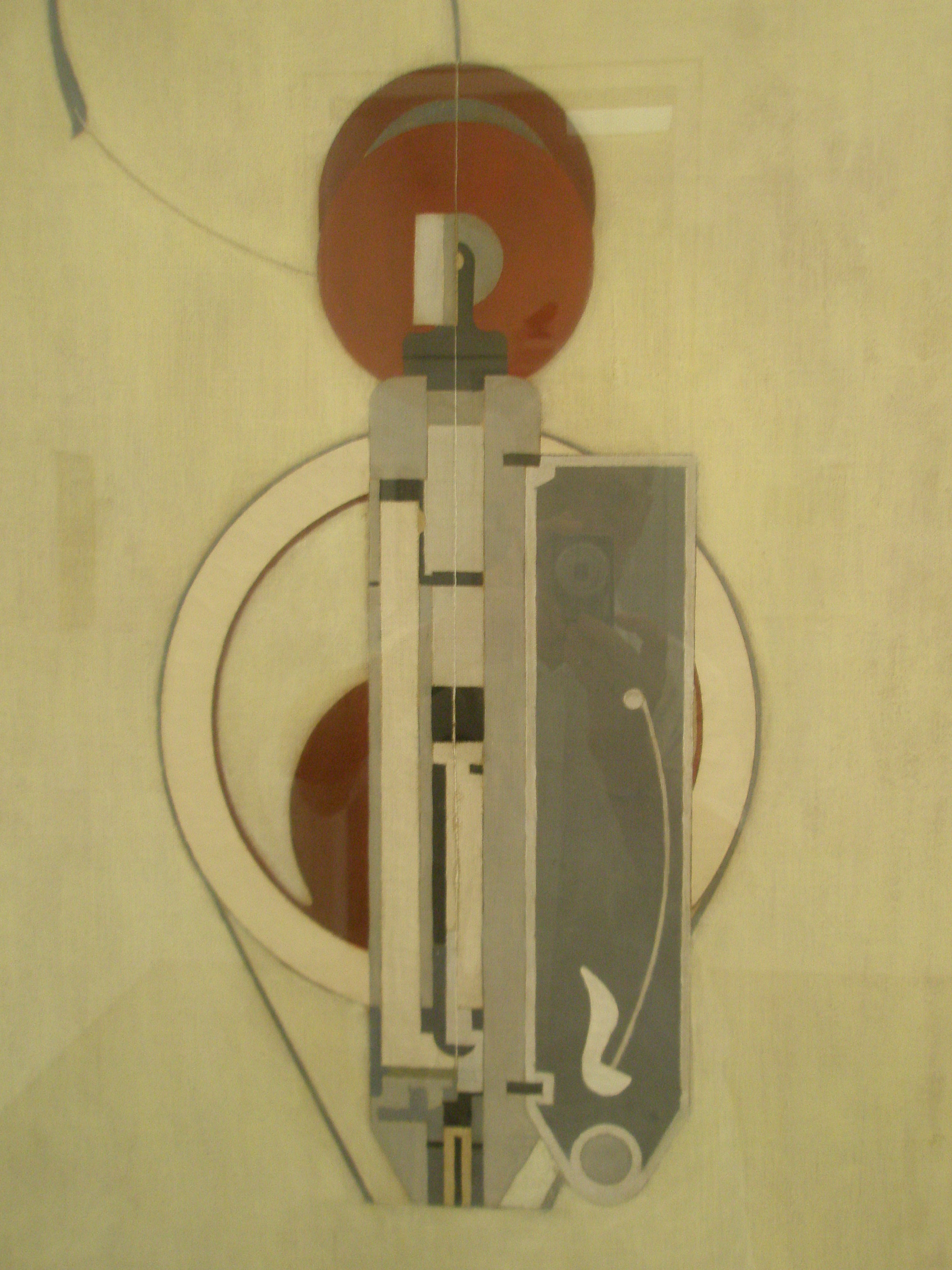
Painting VIII (Mechanical Abstraction), 1916

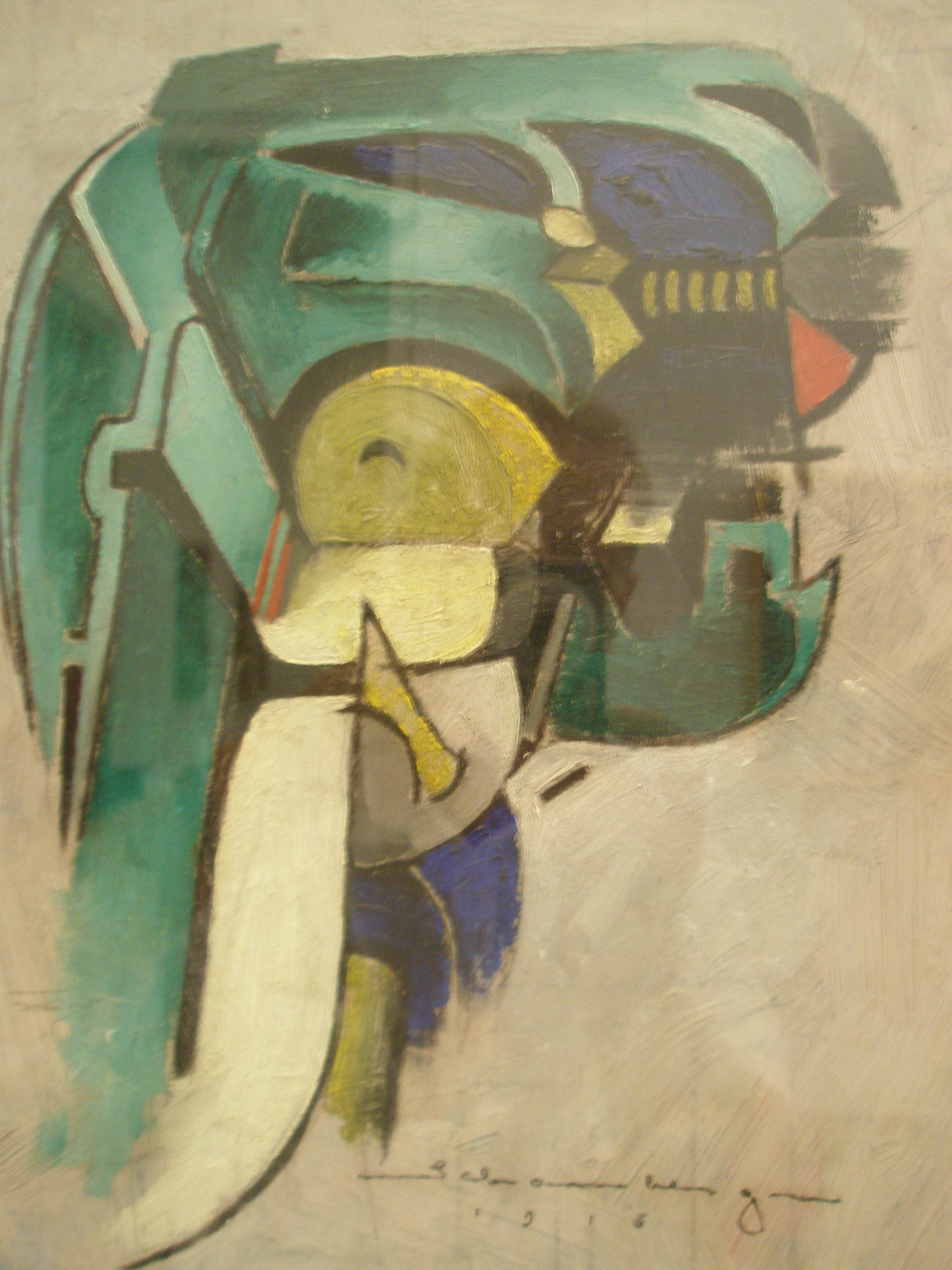
Painting IV (Mechanical Abstraction), 1916

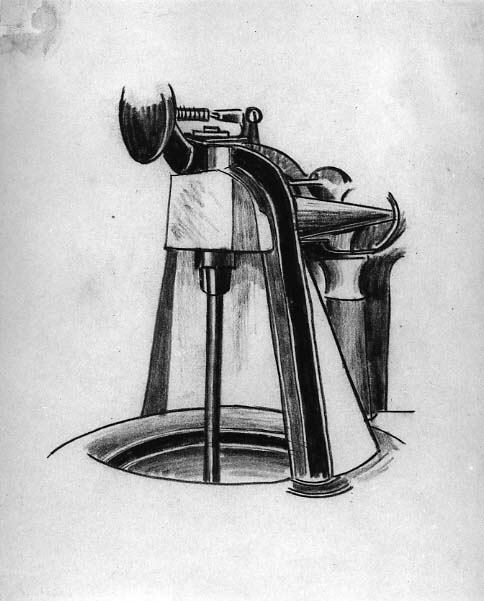
Study for "The Well", c. 1916

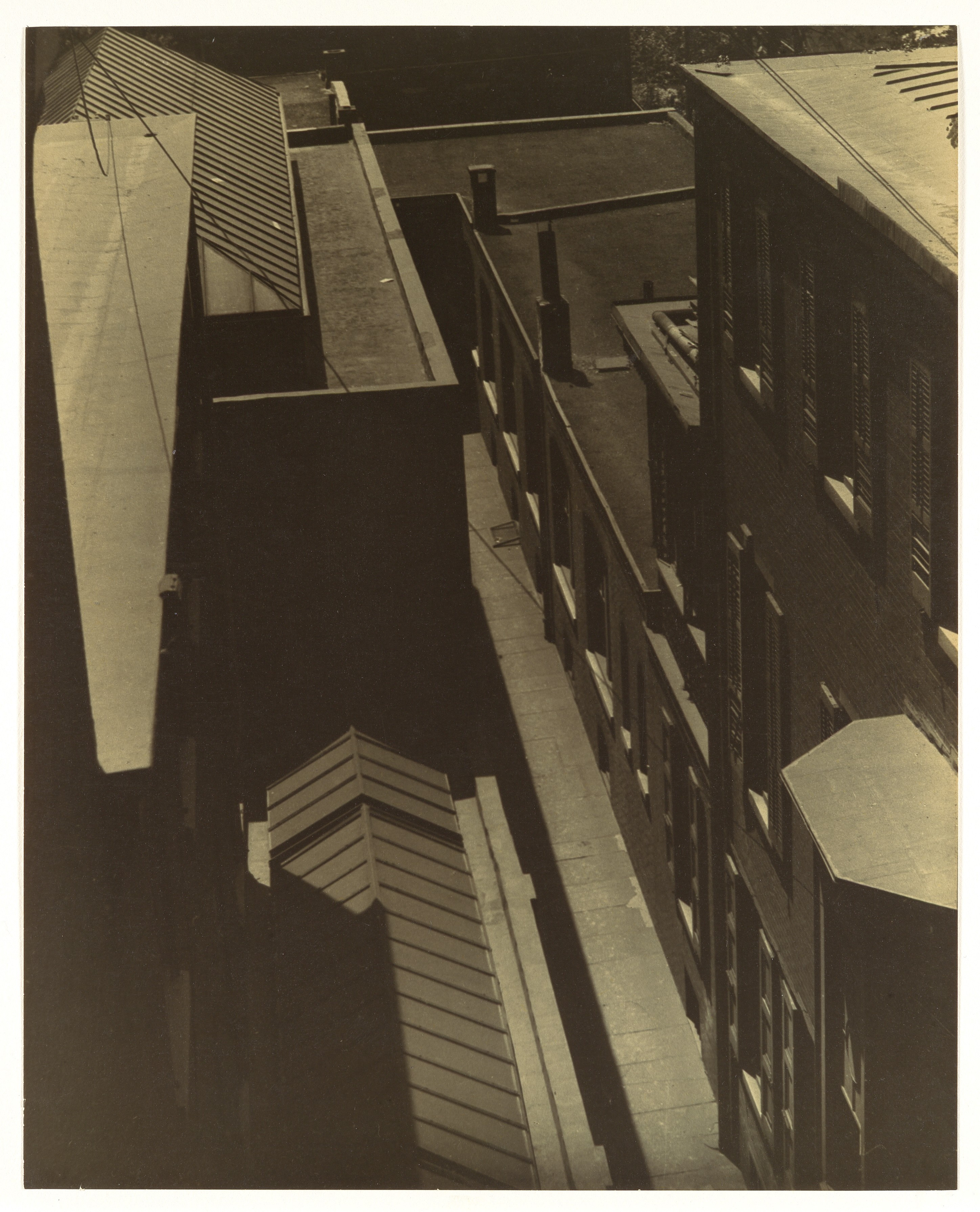
View of Rooftops, 1917; a single print of this photograph was made and given to Charles Sheeler

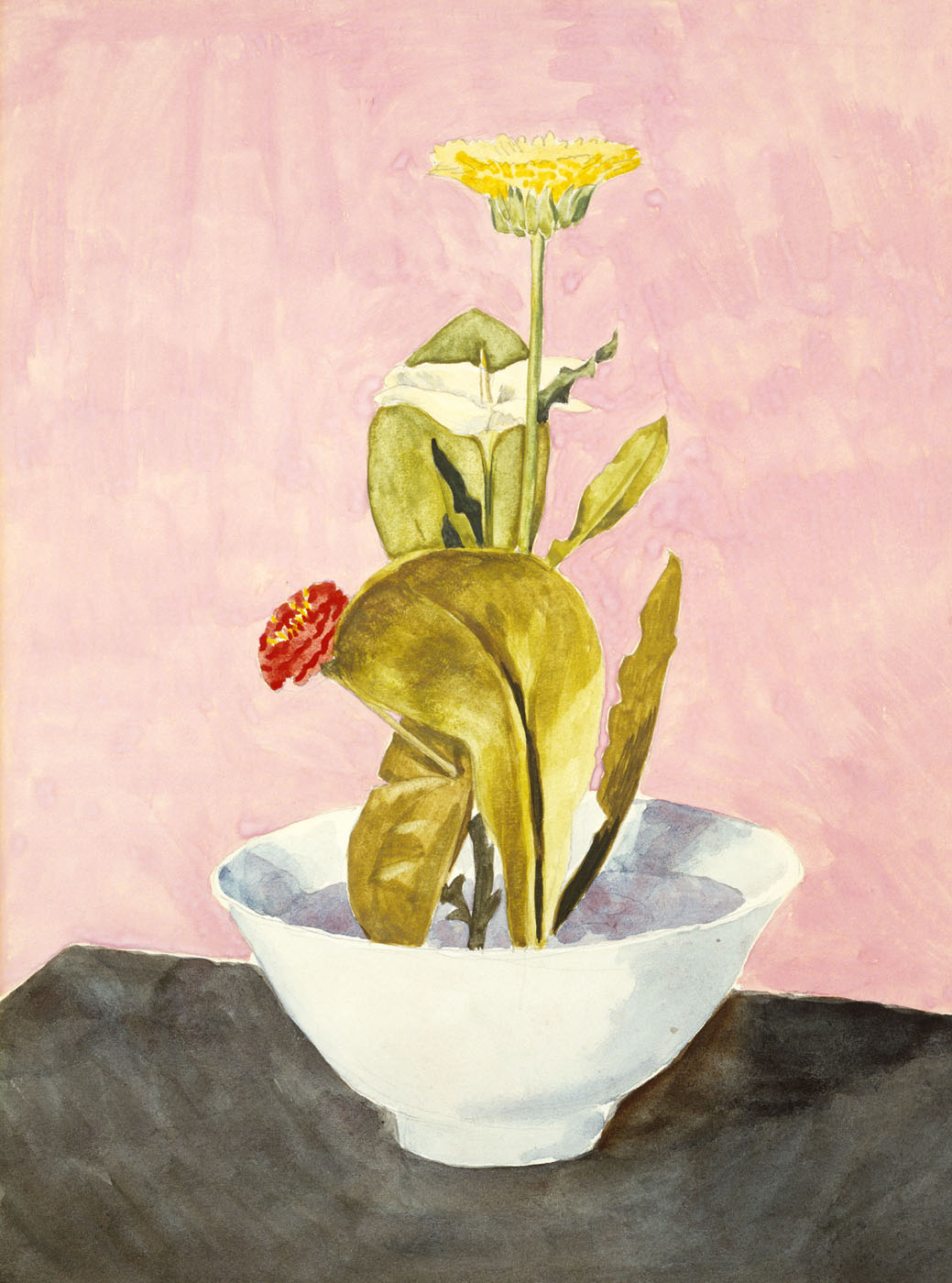
Bowl of Flowers, 1918
