= Michael Hudson (reporter) =

American investigative journalist

- Born: Richmond, Virginia
- Education: Washington and Lee University
- Occupation: Journalist
- Spouse: Darcey Steinke

Michael Hudson is a Pulitzer Prize-winning American investigative journalist. He is currently head of investigations at the Guardian US.

He worked two stints as a senior editor with the International Consortium of Investigative Journalists (ICIJ). At ICIJ, Hudson worked on many major projects, including the organization's Offshore Leaks, China Leaks, Luxembourg Leaks, Panama Papers, FinCEN Files and Pandora Papers investigations of offshore money laundering and tax avoidance. During his first tour at ICIJ, he was an editor, reporter and writer on the Panama Papers investigation, which won the 2017 Pulitzer Prize for explanatory reporting.

In between his two tours at ICIJ, Hudson worked as global investigations editor at The Associated Press, where he edited the AP's investigation of war crimes and corruption in Yemen, which won a 2019 Pulitzer Prize for International Reporting.

Hudson previously reported on police, prisons, poverty and politics for The Roanoke (Va.) Times and covered business and finance for the Wall Street Journal and the Center for Public Integrity. Hudson's book The Monster: How a Gang of Predatory Lenders and Wall Street Bankers Fleeced America – and Spawned a Global Crisis, was named 2010 Book of the Year by Baltimore City Paper.

== Education ==
Hudson was born in Richmond, Virginia and grew up in Franklin County, Virginia. He attended Ferrum College and the University of Richmond and graduated from Washington and Lee University in 1985.

=== Subprime mortgage reporting ===
Columbia Journalism Review has called Hudson the reporter who "beat the world on subprime abuses" and credited him with being ahead of the rest of the media in exposing the fraudulent lending practices that were the driving causes of the mortgage crisis. Businessjournalism.org has called him the "guru of all things predatory lending." Hudson began investigating the subprime mortgage industry in the early 1990s.

In February 2005, Hudson and Los Angeles Times staff writer Scott Reckard broke a story about "boiler room" sales tactics at Ameriquest Mortgage, the flagship company of the nation's largest subprime lending operation and sponsor of the 2005 Super Bowl half-time show. Columbia Journalism Review later called the "boiler room" story and a follow-up piece "[t]wo of the most revealing stories on the culture that overtook the lending industry." In January 2006, Ameriquest agreed to pay a $325 million predatory lending settlement in 49 states and the District of Columbia.

In June 2008, Ireland's Sunday Business Post cited Hudson's 1996 book, Merchants of Misery, for "describ[ing], in great detail, how mortgage-backed securities invented in the 1980s were making a large pool of money available to shady lenders who were making predatory loans to very poor customers at very high rates."

Hudson appeared in the documentary film Maxed Out: Hard Times, Easy Credit and the Era of Predatory Lenders.

=== Reporting on whistleblowers ===
At the Center for Public Integrity, Hudson focused on whistleblower issues and other financial stories. His work included a series of articles, "The Great Mortgage Cover-Up," about the treatment of whistleblowers who reported fraud inside the U.S. mortgage industry. The series identified 63 former employees at 20 financial institutions who claimed they were fired or demoted for reporting fraud or refusing to commit fraud. A follow-up piece focused on the story of General Electric Co.'s foray into subprime in 2004–07, reporting on eight former employees of GE's WMC Mortgage unit who say management brushed them aside when they flagged loans supported by falsified documents, inflated incomes or other legerdemain. The first installment in the series was selected to appear in the Columbia Journalism Review's Best Business Writing 2012.

=== Books ===
Hudson edited Merchants of Misery: How Corporate America Profits from Poverty. He is also the author of The Monster: How a Gang of Predatory Lenders and Wall Street Bankers Fleeced America – and Spawned a Global Crisis, published in October 2010 by St. Martin's Press. The book focuses on two firms – Ameriquest Mortgage and Lehman Brothers – that were key players in the rise and fall of the subprime mortgage industry. It was named 2010 Book of the Year by Baltimore City Paper.

=== Awards ===
Hudson shared a John Hancock Award for financial reporting and a Sidney Hillman Award for social justice journalism for stories in the Southern Exposure Magazine's fall 1993 issue titled "Poverty Inc.," about subprime lenders and other businesses that market to low-income and minority consumers. Those stories were also named as a finalist for a National Magazine Award. Hudson shared a George Polk Award for magazine reporting and a Harry Chapin Media Award for stories published in 2003 in Southern Exposure about Citigroup's subprime mortgage lending operations

Hudson's post-financial-crisis work on The Great Mortgage Cover-Up was recognized with an Excellence in Financial Journalism Award from the New York State Society of Certified Public Accountants as well as two "Best-in-Business" awards from the Society of American Business Editors and Writers.

For his work at ICIJ, he has shared numerous accolades, including a Barlett and Steele Gold Medal, three George Polk Awards, four Scripps Howard awards and four Investigative Reporters and Editors awards. ICIJ's World Bank investigation, which Hudson led as project editor and reporter/writer, won a dozen honors, including an Overseas Press Club Award, a National Headliner Award and an Online News Association Award for Innovation in Investigative Reporting (Large Media Category).

=== Publications and broadcast appearances ===
Hudson's writing has appeared in a number of publications, including Le Monde, El Pais, The Sydney Morning Herald, Forbes, The New York Times, The Washington Post, AARP: The Magazine, The Huffington Post, Washington Monthly and National Law Journal. He has appeared on C-SPAN, NBC Nightly News, and National Public Radio's Morning Edition, Talk of the Nation, and Fresh Air with Terry Gross. Hudson has been interviewed by Mother Jones.

== Criticism ==
Some business representatives have been critical of Hudson's reporting. Lawyers for Ford Motor Company criticized Hudson's 1990s reporting on Associates Financial Services, the Ford subprime lending subsidiary that was later the subject of a predatory lending settlement with the Federal Trade Commission. The lawyers called Hudson's book, Merchants of Misery, which included a chapter on Ford and Associates, "impertinent" and "scandalous." IndyMac Bank objected to a June 30, 2008, report that Hudson wrote for the Center for Responsible Lending, IndyMac: What Went Wrong?, which found evidence that the bank had "engaged in unsound and abusive lending during the mortgage boom, routinely making loans without regard to borrowers' ability to repay." Shortly before the bank was seized by federal regulators, an IndyMac spokesman dismissed the report as a "hit piece" that "relies on unsubstantiated anecdotal evidence." The U.S. Department of the Treasury inspector general's office later reported that its investigation indicated IndyMac had done "little, if any, review of borrower qualifications, including income, assets and employment."

== Personal life ==
Hudson married author Darcey Steinke in June 2009. It is his second marriage.
