= Body Sweats: The Uncensored Writings of Elsa von Freytag-Loringhoven =

Book by Elsa von Freytag-Loringhoven

- Author: Elsa von Freytag-Loringhoven; Irene Gammel (ed.); Suzanne Zelazo (ed.)
- Set in: Cambridge, MA
- Published: 2011 (MIT Press)
- Publication place: United States
- ISBN: 0-262-01622-2

Body Sweats: The Uncensored Writings of Elsa von Freytag-Loringhoven is the first major English collection of poems by dadaist poet and artist Elsa von Freytag-Loringhoven (1874–1927), also known as "The Baroness". Published posthumously in 2011 by MIT Press, Body Sweats was edited by Elsa von Freytag-Loringhoven biographer Irene Gammel and poet and poetics scholar Suzanne Zelazo.

The collection fulfills the Baroness's desire to see her poetry published in a book, a project she began but did not achieve during her lifetime. Djuna Barnes, a close friend and editor, is credited for her work in protecting the von Freytag-Loringhoven manuscripts after the Baroness's death.

Beginning with an introduction to the poetic style and eccentric life of Elsa von Freytag-Loringhoven, the book goes on to showcase the poems of the Baroness, many previously unpublished. Body Sweats also includes images of the original handwritten manuscripts, themselves art objects. The poems are organized by theme: love and longing, embodiment, city and consumption, performing nature, philosophical contemplation, death and suicide, aesthetic consciousness, sonic poems, visual poems, as well as a section containing long poems and poetic criticism.

The majority of poems printed were obtained from the University of Maryland Library Elsa von Freytag-Loringhoven Papers, as well as the University of Wisconsin-Milwaukee Library's The Little Review Records.
