= Brooklyn Book Festival =

Annual book fair in New York

Coordinates: 40.69268°N 73.99021°W

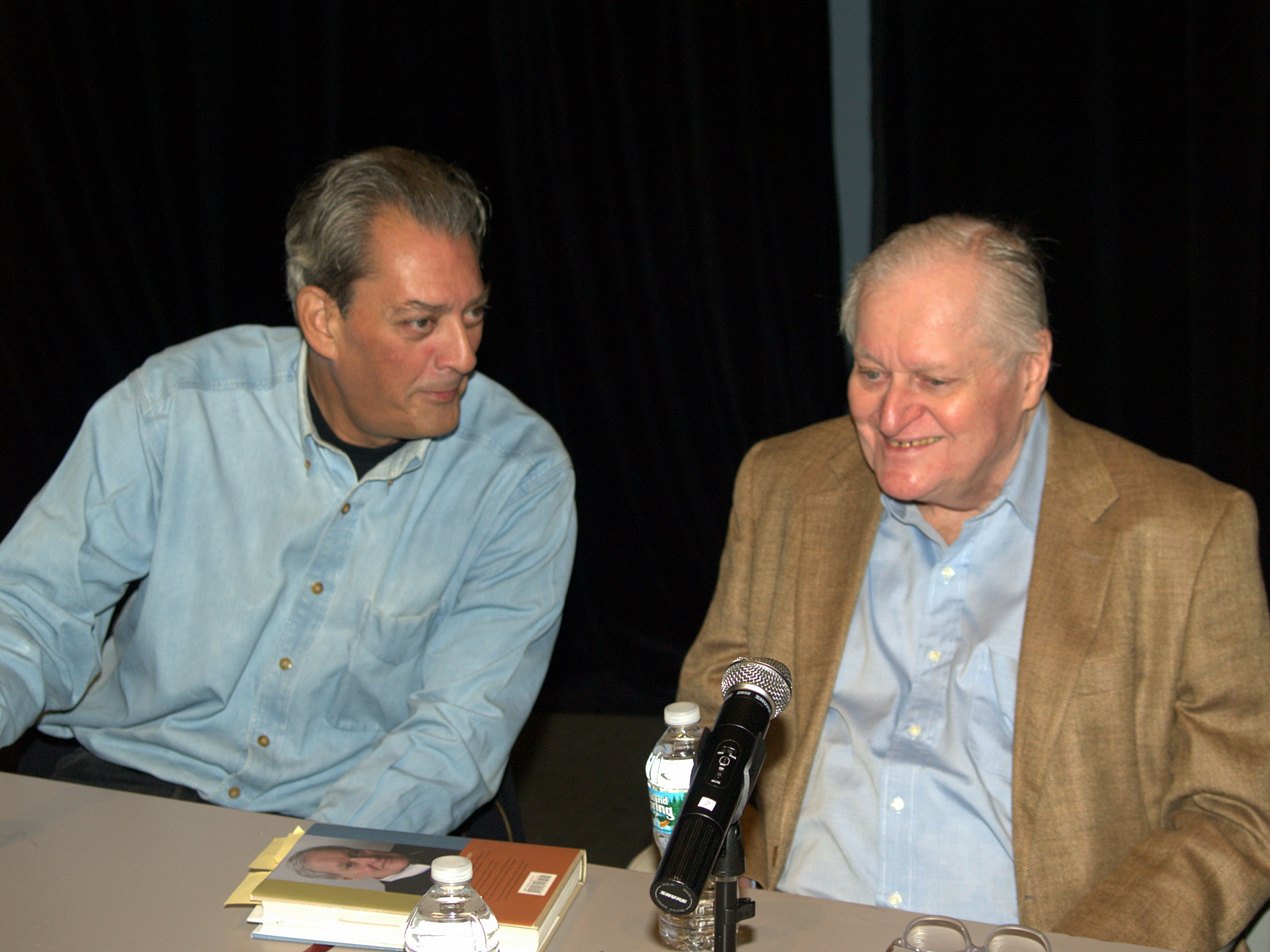
- Paul Auster and John Ashbery discuss their work at the 2010 festival.
- Genre: Book fair and book reading
- Locations: Brooklyn, New York, U.S.
- Country: United States
- Inaugurated: September 16, 2006; 20 years ago
- Founder: Marty Markowitz
- Attendance: 30–35,000
- Website: brooklynbookfestival.org

The Brooklyn Book Festival is an annual book fair held in the fall in Brooklyn, New York, United States. It was begun in 2006 by Brooklyn Borough President Marty Markowitz, co-producers Liz Koch and Carolyn Greer, who wanted to showcase the "Brooklyn voice" in literature, as numerous authors reside in the borough. In subsequent years, the fair has expanded its scope and hosted many non-Brooklyn and international writers, including Joan Didion, Dennis Lehane, John Reed, Rosanne Cash, Salman Rushdie, Karl Ove Knausgård and Dave Eggers.

In 2009, attendance reached 30,000. Also in 2009, St. Francis College established a biannual Literary Prize worth US$50,000 to support a mid-career writer. The winner of the prize is announced by a panel of authors during the Brooklyn Book Festival every other year in September.

The festival includes themed readings, panel discussions, vendors, and author signings. In recent years, the Book Festival has expanded to include a Children's Day and Bookends, literary-themed events, such as book readings, parties, stand-up shows and performances in various public venues in Brooklyn.
