= Michael Hornburg =

American writer and literary agent (born 1960)

- Born: October 31, 1960 (age 65); Chicago, Illinois, U.S.
- Education: Portland State University
- Occupations: Writer; literary agent
- Notable work: Bongwater; Downers Grove

Michael Hornburg (born October 31, 1960) is an American writer and literary agent. He has published two novels: Bongwater (1995) and Downers Grove (1999), both of which have been adapted into feature films. He has also written for the Portland, Oregon publication The Portland Mercury.

== Biography ==
Hornburg was born in Chicago, where he lived on the city's north side until age fourteen before relocating to Downers Grove. He attended Downers Grove South High School, where he graduated in 1978. After graduating high school, Hornburg moved to Portland, Oregon and attended Portland State University. His first novel, Bongwater, published in 1995, was based on his experiences living there, as well as his purported relationship with a then-unknown Courtney Love. In 1998, Bongwater was adapted into a film of the same name starring Luke Wilson, Alicia Witt, Brittany Murphy, and Jack Black.

His second book, a coming-of-age horror novel titled Downers Grove, was published in 1999, and reprinted in 2001. The novel received positive critical reception; Robin Henley of The Chicago Tribune wrote: "If the story and setting sound like territory that has been well-trod, that's because it has been, but what makes this novel a welcome addition to the canon of coming-of-age literature is the voice Hornburg has created for Chrissie. Hornburg knows the rhythms of teenage world-weariness, a self-possessed patter that often belies the terror of straddling the worlds of adulthood and childhood." It would also later be adapted into a feature film, titled The Curse of Downers Grove (2015), adapted by Bret Easton Ellis. In a 2015 interview, Hornburg stated he was working on a new book loosely connected to his first novel, Bongwater.

In addition to novels, Hornburg also worked as a writer for The Portland Mercury.

== Personal life ==
He was previously married to writer Darcey Steinke, with whom he has a daughter, born in 1996. Hornburg lives in Brooklyn, New York.

== Bibliography ==
- Bongwater. Grove Press. 1995. ISBN 978-0-802-11510-2.
- Downers Grove. William Morrow and Company. 1999. ISBN 978-0802137937.
