= Bongwater (novel) =

1995 novel by Michael Hornburg

- First edition cover art
- Author: Michael Hornburg
- Cover artist: John Gall
- Language: English
- Genre: Novel, roman à clef
- Published: April 30, 1995 (Grove Press)
- Publication place: United States
- Media type: Print
- Pages: 189
- ISBN: 978-0-802-11510-2
- OCLC: 761469724

Bongwater is a 1995 American debut novel by Michael Hornburg. Utilizing two different narrative perspectives, it follows a drug dealer and his counterculture friends in Portland, Oregon, as well as his tempestuous ex-girlfriend who has fled to New York City after the dissolution of their short-lived relationship.

The novel was adapted into a 1998 film of the same name starring Luke Wilson, Alicia Witt, and Brittany Murphy.

== Plot ==
The novel shifts from first-person narration by David, a marijuana dealer and aspiring filmmaker in Portland, Oregon, to third-person narration by Courtney, his ex-girlfriend who has left Portland and is living in the East Village in New York City, where she has moved into a squat. Prior to leaving, she had caught David's house on fire and left it to burn down.

After Courtney leaves, David moves in with their mutual friends, Robert and Tony, a gay couple, and begins dating Mary, a stripper, but still reminisces of Courtney. David and Mary go to visit David's childhood friend Phil, who grows marijuana in the mountains, while in New York, Courtney's friend Jennifer comes to visit and they attend a party in Brooklyn.

== Conception ==
The novel was based in part on Hornburg's own experiences living in Portland, Oregon in the 1980s, where he was attending Portland State University. The novel's female character, Courtney, was inspired by Courtney Love, whom Hornburg purportedly had a relationship with.

== Reception ==
Alternative Press called the novel "one of coolest books of the year. Hornburg explodes the whole grunge mythos by taking it out of the realm of the flash photo spread and giving us the seamy, unimaginative days upon days of fear and hopelessness." Karen Karbo in reviewing the book, wrote: "No one writing today walks the line between glamour and pathos better than Michael Hornburg. Being young and lost in America has never looked so good, or so terrifying. Bongwater is at once gorgeous, witty, and sad."

In their review of the novel, The Seattle Weekly said: "There is no grunge bodice-ripper [in the novel]; it sticks close to the theory that life is never simple and people always suck. Bongwater is written from first-hand experience, simple prose touched with just enough witty embroidery to seize the imagination. The music is peripheral, the real sound a silent scream."

Leslie Holdcroft of The Seattle Times, however, gave the novel a negative review, writing: "Hornburg brings us the struggling-artists' guide to Portland, including cheap sex, drugs, strippers, drag queens, an accidental house fire and air that "smells like worms." Hornburg's version of Manhattan's East Village looks even worse: Take all those bad things, add violence and concrete...The result is like a bad tourist guide: plenty of street addresses, building names, and insider's tips, but little reason to stay and explore."

== See also ==
- Bongwater (film), a 1998 adaptation of the novel by Richard Sears
