= Bongwater (film) =

- DVD cover
- Directed by: Richard Sears
- Screenplay by: Nora Maccoby; Eric Weiss
- Based on: Bongwater by Michael Hornburg
- Produced by: Laura Bickford; Alessandro F. Uzielli
- Starring: Luke Wilson; Alicia Witt; Jack Black; Brittany Murphy; Amy Locane; Jamie Kennedy; Andy Dick
- Cinematography: Richard Crudo
- Edited by: Lauren Zuckerman
- Music by: Josh Mancell; Mark Mothersbaugh
- Distributed by: First Look International
- Release date: April 19, 1998 (LAIFF)
- Running time: 98 minutes
- Country: United States
- Language: English
- Budget: $1 million

Bongwater is a 1998 American black comedy film directed by Richard Sears and starring Luke Wilson, Alicia Witt, Amy Locane, Brittany Murphy, Jack Black and Andy Dick. Based on the 1995 novel of the same name by Michael Hornburg, the film is set in Portland, Oregon, and follows an aspiring artist and marijuana dealer and his relationship with a tempestuous woman he meets through a client.

== Plot ==
David is a stoner living in Portland, Oregon. After having previously sold marijuana to a woman named Jennifer, he is introduced to her friend, the tempestuous Serena, who is immediately disliked by his friends, Robert and Tony, a gay couple.

Serena develops a liking to David after seeing the artwork he does in his spare time, and encourages him to make a career for himself. After moving into his house, she introduces him to Mary Weiss, the daughter of a local gallery owner who falsely claims to be an art curator.

Serena becomes frustrated with David's lack of ambition, and decides to move to New York City with Tommy, a punk rocker and paranoid heroin addict. Before she leaves, she and David get into a fight, which ends in her burning down his house.

In New York, Serena becomes increasingly frustrated with Tommy's paranoid antics. She meets Bobby one afternoon in a diner, and he invites her to move in with him in his apartment, which she discovers is actually a squat in the East Village.

In Portland, David begins a romance with Mary, and moves in with Robert, Tony, and Jennifer. While hiking with Mary, David runs into his friend Devlin, who is running a spiritual retreat in the woods, where they partake in LSD. While Mary marches through the woods with Devlin, David has a hallucination in which his deceased mother brings him lunch.

In New York, Serena and Jennifer attend a party, where Serena is date raped. The following day, she confesses to Jennifer she wants to return to Portland. They return the next day, but Serena is disheartened soon after when she discovers David and Jennifer having sex.

Several days later, David attends a 1980s-themed party with Jennifer, Robert, and Tony, which is busted by police. He flees to the rooftop, where he finds Serena sitting alone. She confronts him about him having sex with Jennifer, and he asks her if she's planning on staying in Portland. She tells him she isn't sure, and that she doesn't want to become too comfortable there again. She apologizes for the fire she set at David's house. They kiss, and then witness a UFO floating above them in the sky.

== Cast ==
- Luke Wilson as David
- Alicia Witt as Serena
- Amy Locane as Jennifer
- Brittany Murphy as Mary Weiss
- Jack Black as Devlin
- Andy Dick as Tony
- Jeremy Sisto as Robert
- Jamie Kennedy as Tommy
- Scott Caan as Bobby
- Christian J. Meoli as Tobo
- George Kuchar as Homeless Man
- Patricia Wettig as David's Mom
- Michael Artura as Cop
- Scott Anthony Ferguson as Fireman
- Kyle Gass as Guitar Player
- Eric Mabius as Fenton (uncredited)

== Production ==
The screenplay for the film was adapted from Michael Hornburg's 1995 novel of the same name, which was based on his experience living in Portland in the mid-1980s; the Serena character in the film (originally named Courtney in the novel) is based on Courtney Love, whom Hornburg knew in Portland.

The film was shot on location in Portland, Oregon and New York City on a budget of $1,000,000.

== Release ==
The film was released at the Los Angeles Independent Film Festival on April 19, 1998. It was later released on DVD on July 13, 2001.

=== Critical reception ===
The film has mostly received negative reviews from critics. Review aggregator Rotten Tomatoes reports that 17% of six critics gave the film a positive review, with an average rating of 4.7/10.

Lael Loewenstein, film critic for Variety magazine, gave the film a mixed review, writing: "The latest entry in the growing field of indie youth ensemble films, Bongwater is an uneven, intermittently likable movie about a group of Portland residents for whom getting high is a way of life. While its fresh-faced but largely unknown cast members frequently rise above the material, pic isn't distinctive enough to suggest it will yield more than a limited run in specialized markets."

Ann Limpert of Entertainment Weekly gave the film a B rating, writing: "The title notwithstanding, this drug-laden laugh trip is more Reality Bites than Up in Smoke...Though [Wilson and Witt's] lack of real chemistry makes the cuddly ending feel tacked on, the hysterical drug-buddy performances of Brittany Murphy, Andy Dick, and Jack Black really make this joint roll."

TV Guide's Robert Pardi gave the film a negative review, writing: "This smoke-dream love story gives aimlessness a bad name: It's hard to concur with the screenplay's insistence that there's both pathos and humor to be found in the bong-inhaling, bed-hopping lives of these indolent characters."

== Accolades ==
Nominations

- DVD Exclusive Awards (Video Business Magazine): Video Premiere Award, Best Supporting Actress, Brittany Murphy; 2001.
