= Irene Gammel =

Canadian literary historian, biographer, and curator

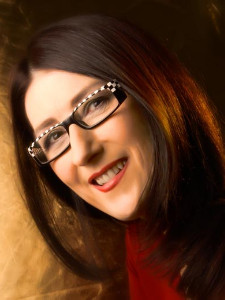
- Education: McMaster University
- Known for: Modernism; Avantgarde; Dada; Canadian Women’s Heritage
- Scientific career
- Fields: Modern Literature and Culture
- Workplaces: University of Prince Edward Island; Toronto Metropolitan University

Irene Gammel FRSC is a Canadian literary historian, biographer, and curator. Gammel's works critically examine women's contributions to literature and art within the cultural context of the 20th century, shedding light on their experiences, challenges, and achievements. Her research delves into the lives of influential women artists and writers, who were often historically sidelined and erased, analyzing their creative processes, historical struggles, and impact on society.

Gammel is Professor of English at Toronto Metropolitan University in Toronto. She holds the Tier I Canada Research Chair in Modern Literature and Culture and is the Director of the Modern Literature and Culture Research Centre. In 2009, she was elected a member of the Royal Society of Canada.

Gammel holds a PhD (1992) and MA (1987) in English from McMaster University, and a Staatsexamen's degree from the Universität des Saarlandes in Germany. She taught at the University of Prince Edward Island and held Visiting Professorships at the Friedrich-Schiller-Universität Jena and Erfurt Universität in Germany. She also served as the President of the Canadian Comparative Literature Association.

== Exhibitions ==
- Irene Gammel curated Anne of Green Gables: A Literary Icon at 100, a cross-Canada centennial exhibition in 2008. With June Creelman, she curated Reflecting on Anne of Green Gables, Souvenirs d’Anne… La maison aux pignons verts at the Library and Archives Canada.

== Publications ==
=== Biography / Non-fiction ===
- I Can Only Paint: The Story of Battlefield Artist Mary Riter Hamilton. Montreal: McGill-Queen's University Press, 2020.
- Looking for Anne: How Lucy Maud Montgomery Dreamed Up a Literary Classic. Toronto: Key Porter Books and New York: St. Martin's Press, 2008.
- Baroness Elsa: Gender, Dada, and Everyday Modernity—A Cultural Biography. Cambridge: MIT Press, 2002.
- Die Dada Baroness: Das wilde Leben der Elsa von Freytag-Loringhoven. Berlin: Ebersbach, 2003.

=== Criticism ===
- Sexualizing Power in Naturalism: Theodore Dreiser and Frederick Philip Grove. Calgary: University of Calgary Press, 1994.

=== Edited books ===
- Creative Resilience and COVID-19: Figuring the Everyday in a Pandemic. New York: Routledge, 2022 (jointly with Jason Wang).
- Florine Stettheimer: New Directions in Multimodal Modernism. Toronto, Book*hug, 2019 (jointly with Suzanne Zelazo).
- Body Sweats: The Uncensored Writings of Elsa von Freytag-Loringhoven. Cambridge: MIT Press, 2011 (jointly with Suzanne Zelazo).
- Crystal Flowers: Poetry and a Libretto by Florine Stettheimer. Toronto: BookThug, 2010 (jointly with Suzanne Zelazo).
- Anne’s World: A New Century of Anne of Green Gables. Toronto: University of Toronto Press, 2010 (jointly with Benjamin Lefebvre).
- I Got Lusting Palate: Dada Verse by Elsa von Freytag-Loringhoven. Berlin: edition ebersbach, 2005.
- The Intimate Life of L.M. Montgomery. Toronto: University of Toronto Press, 2005.
- Making Avonlea: L.M. Montgomery and Popular Culture. Toronto: University of Toronto Press, 2002.
- Confessional Politics: Women's Sexual Self-Representations in Lifewriting and Popular Media. Carbondale and Edwardsville: Southern Illinois University Press, 1999.
- L.M. Montgomery and Canadian Culture. Toronto: University of Toronto Press, 1999 (jointly with Elizabeth Epperly).

== Honors and awards ==
- 2009, elected Fellow of the Royal Society of Canada
- 2022, C.P Stacey Award
