= Portrait of Marcel Duchamp =

Artwork by Elsa von Freytag-Loringhoven

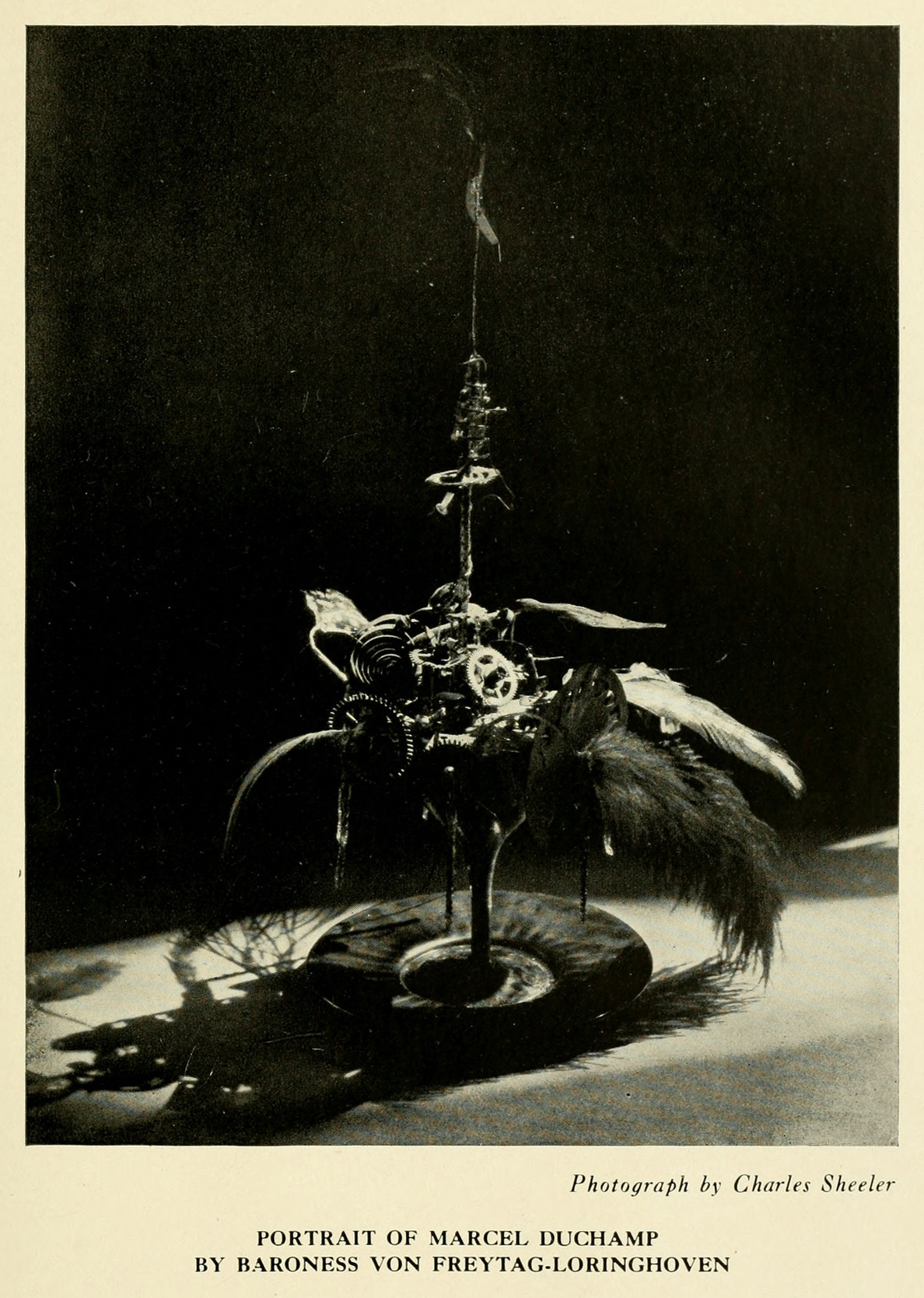
Portrait of Marcel Duchamp by Baroness Freytag-Lohringhoven Photograph by Charles Sheeler as published in The Little Review: Quarterly Journal of Art and Letters Vol. 9, No. 2 (Winter 1922)

Portrait of Marcel Duchamp is a circa 1920–1922 work of art by Baroness Elsa von Freytag-Loringhoven. It is an example of assemblage, made of an amalgamation of broken wine glasses, assorted feathers, tree twigs, and other unidentifiable objects in reference to Marcel Duchamp, who created various ready-mades beginning in 1913.
