= Darcey Steinke =

American author and teacher (born 1962)

- Steinke in 2014
- Born: April 25, 1962 (age 64); Oneida, New York, U.S.
- Education: Goucher College (BA); University of Virginia (MFA)
- Occupation: Author
- Spouse: Michael Hornburg Michael Hudson (m. 2009)
- Website: www.darcey-steinke.com

Darcey Steinke (born April 25, 1962) is an American author and educator. Her most recent memoir, This Is the Door: The Body, Pain, and Faith, released in February 2026. Her other books include the memoirs Flash Count Diary, Easter Everywhere and five novels: Up Through the Water, Suicide Blonde, Jesus Saves, Milk, and Sister Golden Hair. She has been a Henry Hoyns Fellow, a Stegner Fellow, Writer-in-Residence at the University of Mississippi and on the long list of the Independent Book Award and the Arles Author Prize. Steinke has also served as a lecturer at Princeton University, the American University of Paris, New School University, Barnard College, the University of Mississippi, and Columbia University. She lives with her husband in Brooklyn.

== Early life ==
Steinke, born in Oneida, New York, on April 25, 1962, is the daughter of a Lutheran minister. Steinke grew up in upstate New York; Connecticut; Philadelphia; and Roanoke, Virginia.

She is a graduate of Cave Spring High School, Goucher College, and the University of Virginia, where she received a Master of Fine Arts in creative writing. Steinke completed a Stegner Fellowship at Stanford University.

== Career ==
=== Writing ===
She is the author of five novels, Up Through the Water, Suicide Blonde, Jesus Saves, Milk, and Sister Golden Hair, and the spiritual memoir Easter Everywhere. Her most recent memoir, This Is the Door: The Body, Pain, and Faith, was published by Harper Collins in February 2026, and explores how humans and society reckon with pain through the lenses of science, philosophy, religion, spirituality, and art.

Steinke co-edited the collection of essays Joyful Noise: The New Testament Revisited with Rick Moody. Steinke has written extensively on art and literature and has contributed to Spin Magazine, covering the David Koresh Branch Davidian story and contributing a 1993 cover story on Kurt Cobain. In addition, she has a web project called blindspot which was part of the Whitney Biennial in 2000. Her novels Up Through the Water and Jesus Saves were selected as New York Times Notable Books of the Year.

Steinke's prose has been said to "repeatedly hint at the divine in tangible things." According to a Washington Post book review of Steinke's novel Milk, "Steinke writes some beautifully mystical descriptions of sexual encounters, and the conjunction of sex and the spirit, bodies and souls, is fascinating."

Steinke's writing has appeared in The New York Times Magazine, The Boston Review, Vogue, Spin Magazine, The Washington Post, Chicago Tribune, and The Guardian.

=== Teaching ===
Steinke teaches creative writing at Princeton University and the American University of Paris and in the graduate programs at New School University and Columbia University. She previously taught at the University of Mississippi, where she was a writer-in-residence, and at Barnard College.

== Personal life ==
Steinke married journalist Michael Hudson in June 2009. It is her second marriage after writer Michael Hornburg. Steinke lives in Brooklyn with her husband. Steinke played guitar in the New York-based rock band Ruffian. Her cousin René Steinke is also an author. She has written about how her struggles with a stutter contributed to her writing career.

== Bibliography ==
=== Fiction ===
- Up Through the Water (1989)
- Suicide Blonde (1992)
- Jesus Saves (1999)
- Milk (2005) Bloomsbury Publishing
- Sister Golden Hair (October 2014) Tin House Books

=== Nonfiction ===
- Joyful Noise: The New Testament Revisited (co-editor, with Rick Moody, and contributor) (1997)
- Easter Everywhere (2007) (memoir)
- Flash Count Diary: Menopause and the Vindication of Natural Life (2019)
- God Is In The House (2020), an essay about the musician & songwriter Nick Cave, contained in his book Stranger Than Kindness (Canongate), published in association with Stranger Than Kindness: The Nick Cave Exhibition, Royal Danish Library, Copenhagen, March 23 – October 3, 2020
- This Is the Door: The Body, Pain, and Faith (2026) HarperOne
