= Downers Grove (novel) =

1999 novel by Michael Hornburg

- First edition cover art
- Author: Michael Hornburg
- Language: English
- Genre: Bildungsroman, horror novel
- Published: July 21, 1999 (William Morrow); April 9, 2001 (reprint; Grove Press)
- Publication place: United States
- Media type: Print
- Pages: 240
- ISBN: 978-0-688-16528-4
- LC Class: PS3558.O6873 D69 1999

Downers Grove is a 1999 American coming-of-age horror novel by Michael Hornburg. Its plot centers on the last two weeks of a teenage girl's life as a high school student growing up in Downers Grove, Illinois. The novel was originally published by William Morrow and Company in 1999, and reprinted in 2001 by Grove Press.

== Plot ==
Crystal Methedrine Swanson, known as Chrissie, is a teenager in Downers Grove, Illinois, about to graduate from high school. Her father has disappeared, while her brother has become a heroin addict, and her mother has begun dating a bizarre man. As her graduation nears, Chrissie and her close friend, Tracey, worry about a curse surrounding the high school that has led to multiple students dying each year. After nearly being raped at a party by one of the school's football players and harassed after, she worries she may become the next victim.

== Reception ==
Publishers Weekly gave the book a positive review, calling the novel "disquieting in its timeliness." Robin Henley of the Chicago Tribune wrote: "If the story and setting sound like territory that has been well-trod, that's because it has been, but what makes this novel a welcome addition to the canon of coming-of-age literature is the voice Hornburg has created for Chrissie. Hornburg knows the rhythms of teenage world-weariness, a self-possessed patter that often belies the terror of straddling the worlds of adulthood and childhood."

== Adaptations ==
The novel was adapted by Bret Easton Ellis into a film in 2015.
