= New York Dada =

Regionalized artistic and cultural movement

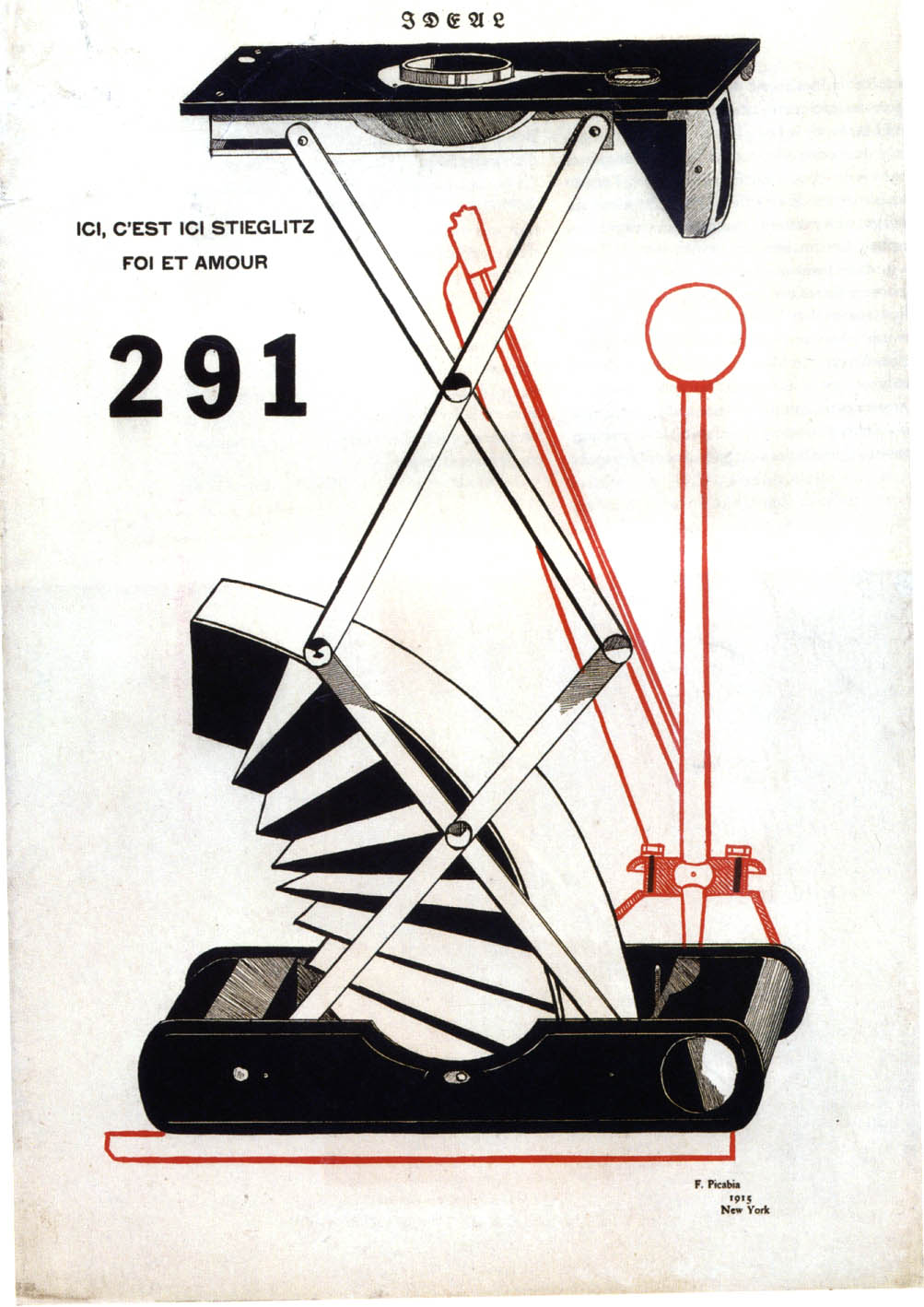
Francis Picabia, Ici, c'est ici Stieglitz, foi et amour, cover of 291, No. 1, 1915

New York Dada was a regionalized extension of Dada, an artistic and cultural movement between the years 1913 and 1923. Usually considered to have been instigated by Marcel Duchamp's Fountain exhibited at the first exhibition of the Society of Independent Artists in 1917, and becoming a movement at the Cabaret Voltaire in February, 1916, in Zürich, the Dadaism as a loose network of artists spread across Europe and other countries, with New York becoming the primary center of Dada in the United States. The very word Dada is notoriously difficult to define and its origins are disputed, particularly amongst the Dadaists themselves.

The Dada movement has had continuous reverberations in New York art culture and in the art world generally ever since its inception, and it was a major influence on the New York School and Pop Art. Nevertheless, any attempt to articulate solid links between Dada and these movements must be tenuous at best. Such an attempt must begin philosophically with an acknowledgement of the Dadaists' demand to create a new world and artistically with an examination of the techniques the Dadaists used to do so.

== Overview ==
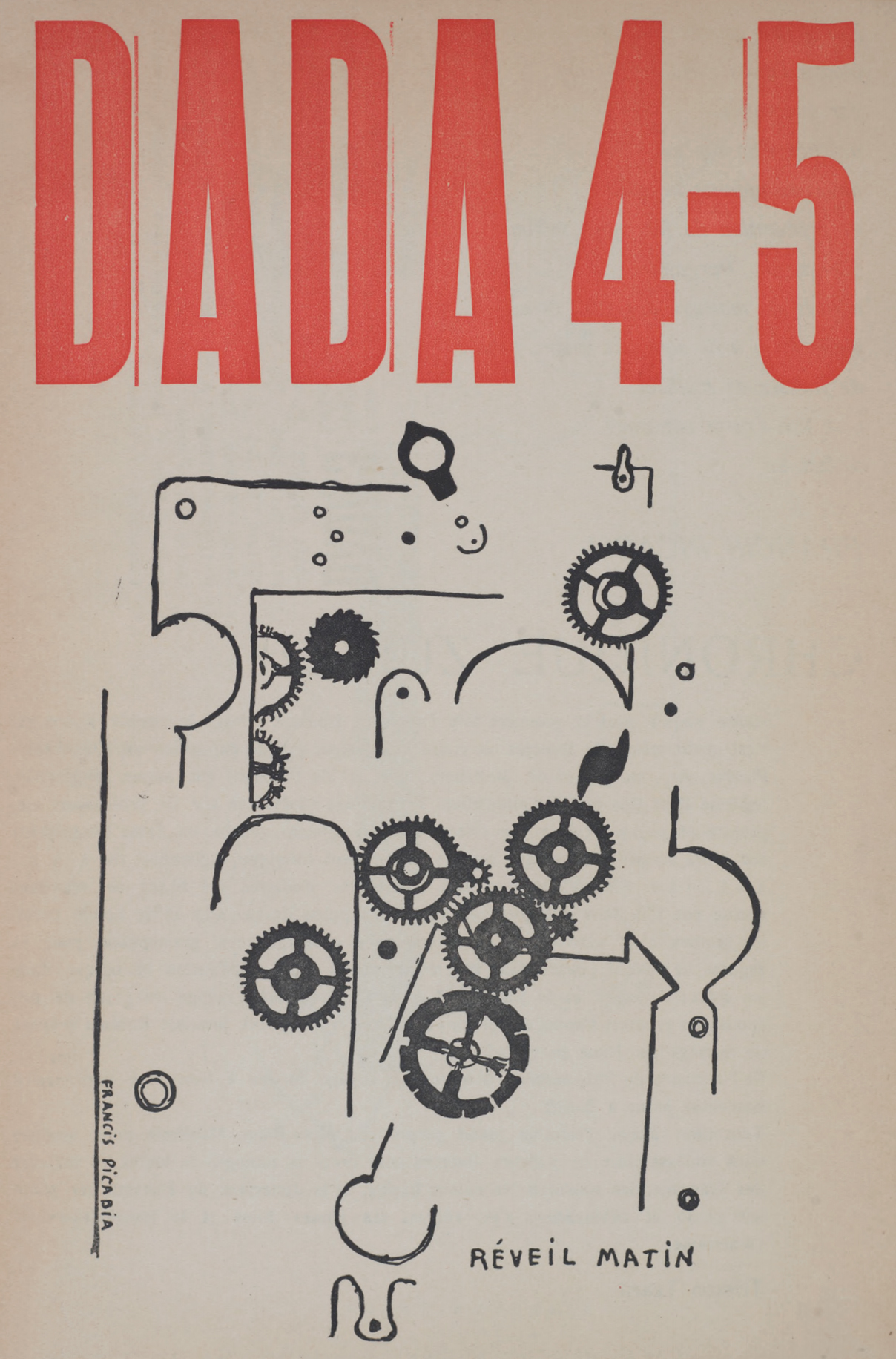
Francis Picabia, Réveil Matin (Alarm Clock), Dada 4-5, Number 5, 15 May 1919

"New York Dada" refers in general to the actions and principles of a group of loosely affiliated artists involved in the production, display, distribution, and criticism of art, being produced in the years 1913 to 1923 in New York City. The primary artists were Marcel Duchamp, Francis Picabia, Man Ray, Beatrice Wood, Louise Norton, Elsa von Freytag-Loringhoven, Juliette Roche Gleizes, and Jean Crotti. Because of this groups philosophical orientation (with an anti-nationalistic, anti-war, and anti-bourgeois attitude featuring prominently), techniques of art production (from varieties of Cubism to collage as well as ready-mades), critique of prior forms of art (in particular those forms identified with classical conceptions of mimetic representation, as well as those deemed tainted by affiliation with aristocratic or bourgeois values and or aristocratic or bourgeois patronage), self-pronounced allegiances (with each other as well as other avant-garde artists), and relation to other similar groups in Europe, they are referred to as Dada. "New York Dada" developed independently of Zürich Dada. According to Hans Richter, "We in Zurich remained unaware until 1917 or 1918 of a development which was taking place, quite independently, in New York."

The creations of Duchamp, Picabia, Man Ray, and others between the Armory Show in 1913 and 1917 eluded the term Dada at the time, and "New York Dada" came to be seen as a post facto invention of Duchamp. At the outset of the 1920s the term Dada flourished in Europe with the help of Duchamp and Picabia, who had both returned from New York. Notwithstanding, Dadaists such as Tzara and Richter claimed European precedence. Art historian David Hopkins notes:

Ironically, though, Duchamp's late activities in New York, along with the machinations of Picabia, re-cast Dada's history. Dada's European chroniclers—primarily Richter, Tzara, and Huelsenbeck—would eventually become preoccupied with establishing the pre-eminence of Zürich and Berlin at the foundations of Dada, but it proved to be Duchamp who was most strategically brilliant in manipulating the genealogy of this avant-garde formation, deftly turning New York Dada from a late-comer into an originating force.

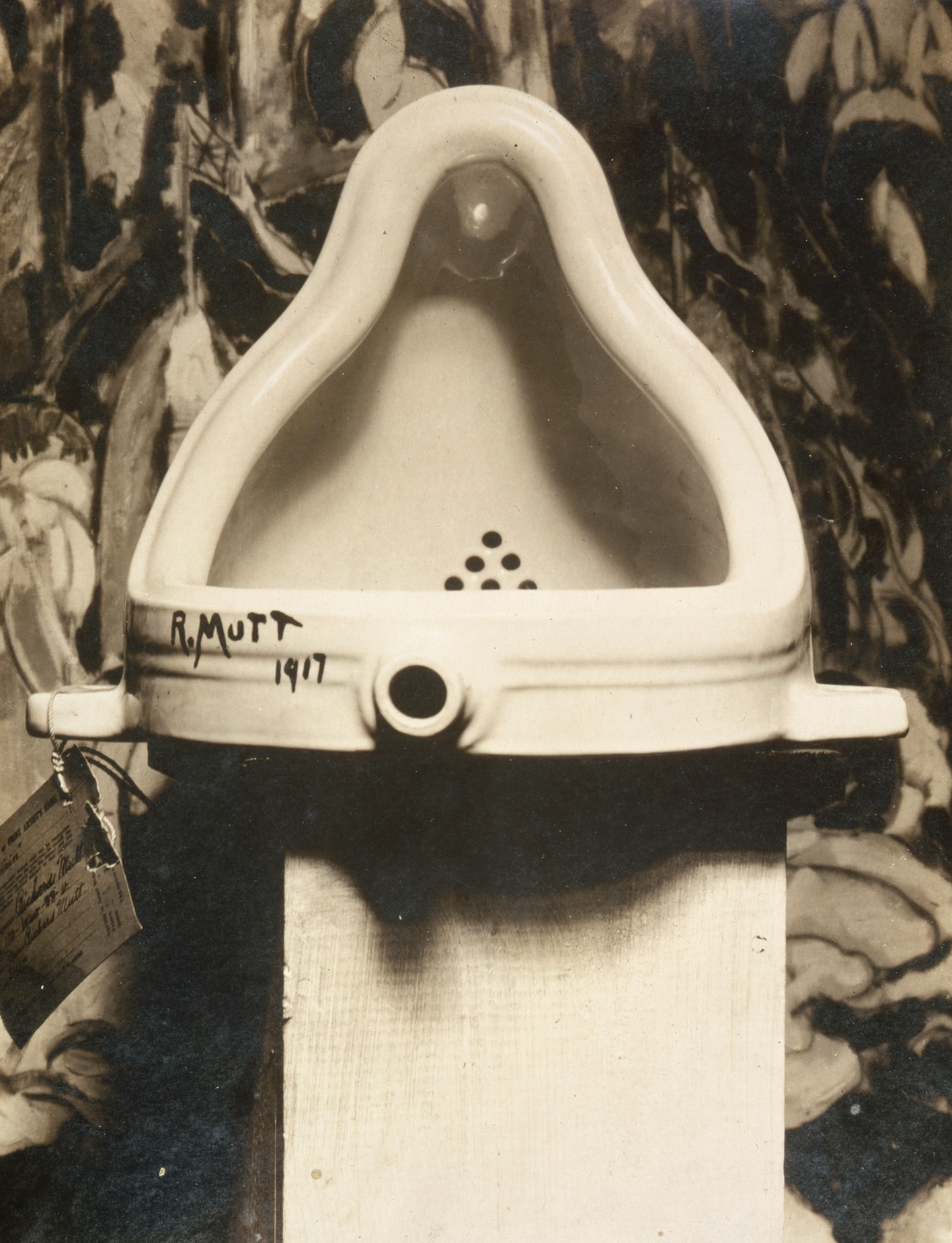
Marcel Duchamp, Fountain, 1917; photograph by Alfred Stieglitz

The group began to take shape beginning with a showing of the work of Picabia at gallery 291. The gallery was owned and operated by renowned and historically influential photographer Alfred Stieglitz Coupled with Stieglitz’s gallery, the patronage, enthusiasm, and intellectual support of the Arsenbergs provided the economic conditions of possibility for the Dada artists to exist in New York at that time. The armory show in 1913 is where a few of the works of Picabia and Duchamp set the stage for future endeavors. New York, the archetypical city of modernity, was an attractive destination for Duchamp as well as others because of the relative calm as well as the energy it offered in comparison to war plagued Europe. Duchamp once remarked, "I do not go to New York, I escape Paris." Speaking of a series of New York inspired paintings, Picabia once said that "they express the spirit of New York as I feel it, the crowded streets ... their surging, their unrest, their commercialism, their atmospheric charm ... You of New York should be quick to understand me and my fellow painters [because] your New York is the cubist, futurist city."

== People ==
=== Alfred Stieglitz ===
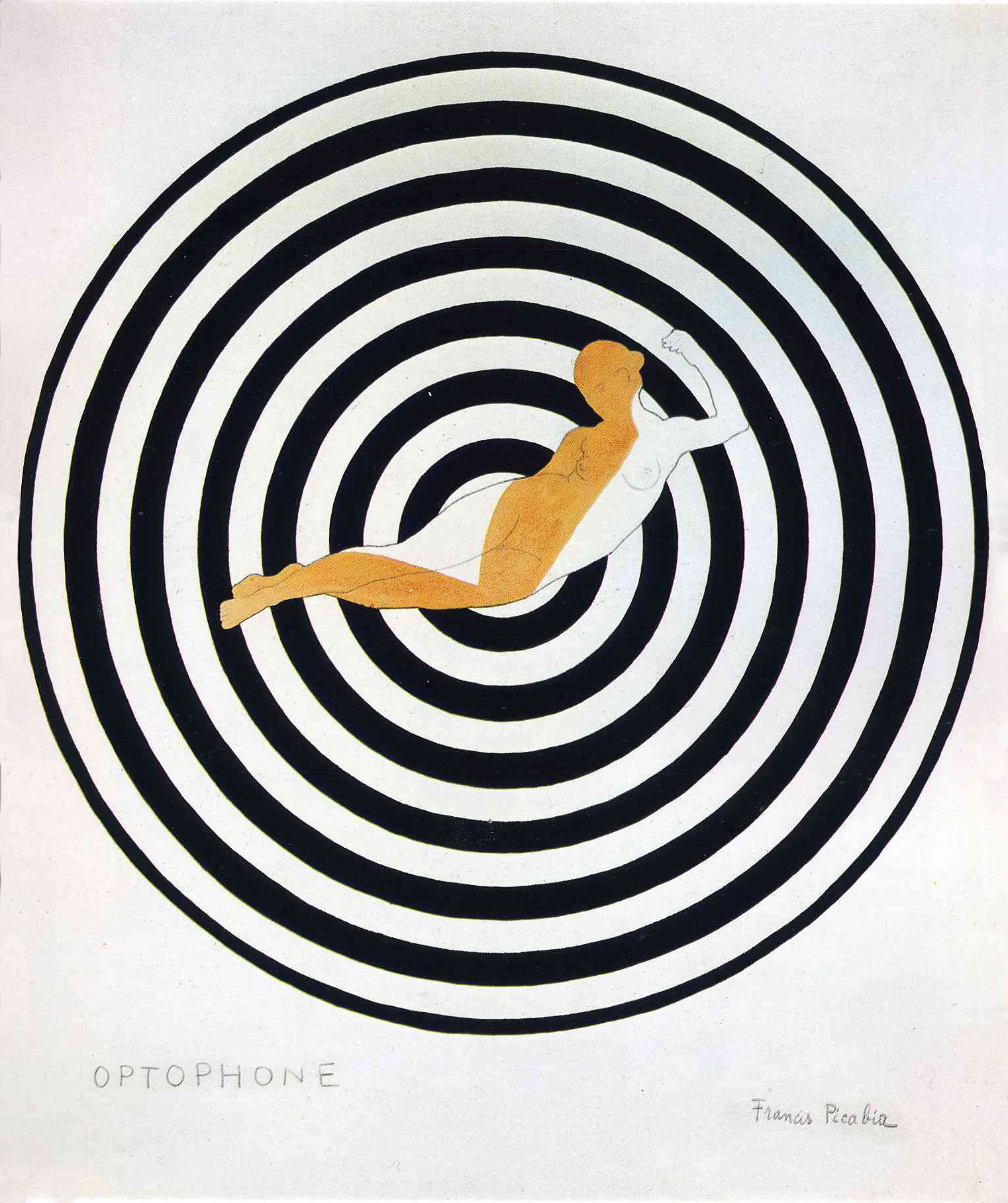
Francis Picabia, c.1921-22, Optophone I, 72 x 60 cm. Reproduced in Galeries Dalmau, Picabia, exhibition catalogue, Barcelona, November 18 - December 8, 1922

According to Naumann, Alfred Stieglitz was unquestionably "the individual most responsible for the introduction of modern art to America." An active artist, primarily a photographer, as well as activist in the service of modern art, Stieglitz provided an avenue for the thought and work of the proto-Dada artists as well as the Dada artists with his journal and gallery, both named 291. Stieglitz first made contact with the (soon to be) Dadaists at the notorious Armory show of 1913 where Picabia and Duchamp exhibited paintings that caused an uproar in the New York art scene. Duchamp's Nude Descending a Staircase and Picabia's Dances at the Spring featured prominently at the show and caught the eye of Stieglitz, they proved to be just a taste of what was to come. According to Richter, "Stieglitz was a man of lively perception, intensely interested in everything that was new and revolutionary," undoubtedly this demeanor and demand to seek new forms of artistic expression made him a perfect match for the European's coming ashore.

=== The Arensbergs ===
Walter Conrad Arensberg and his wife Louise were eccentric collectors of modern art and some of the earliest backers of the Dada artists. Without their support it is unlikely that any of the European Dadaists would have been able to live comfortably in New York and produce their art. They frequently hosted parties, exhibitions, and every other conceivable form of gathering at their large and very minimalist apartment on the Upper West Side of Manhattan. Beginning with the Armory show of 1913 Walter was "hit between wind and water." With an apartment filled with art pieces that now adorn the walls of major museums (particularly the Philadelphia Museum of Art) the Arensbergs built a hive for the intellectual debates and creative juices of the Dadaists; "Over the course of five years – from 1915 through 1921 – they created a literary and artistic salon that could be ranked in importance with the circle that had formed around Gertrude Stein and her brothers in Paris a few years earlier."

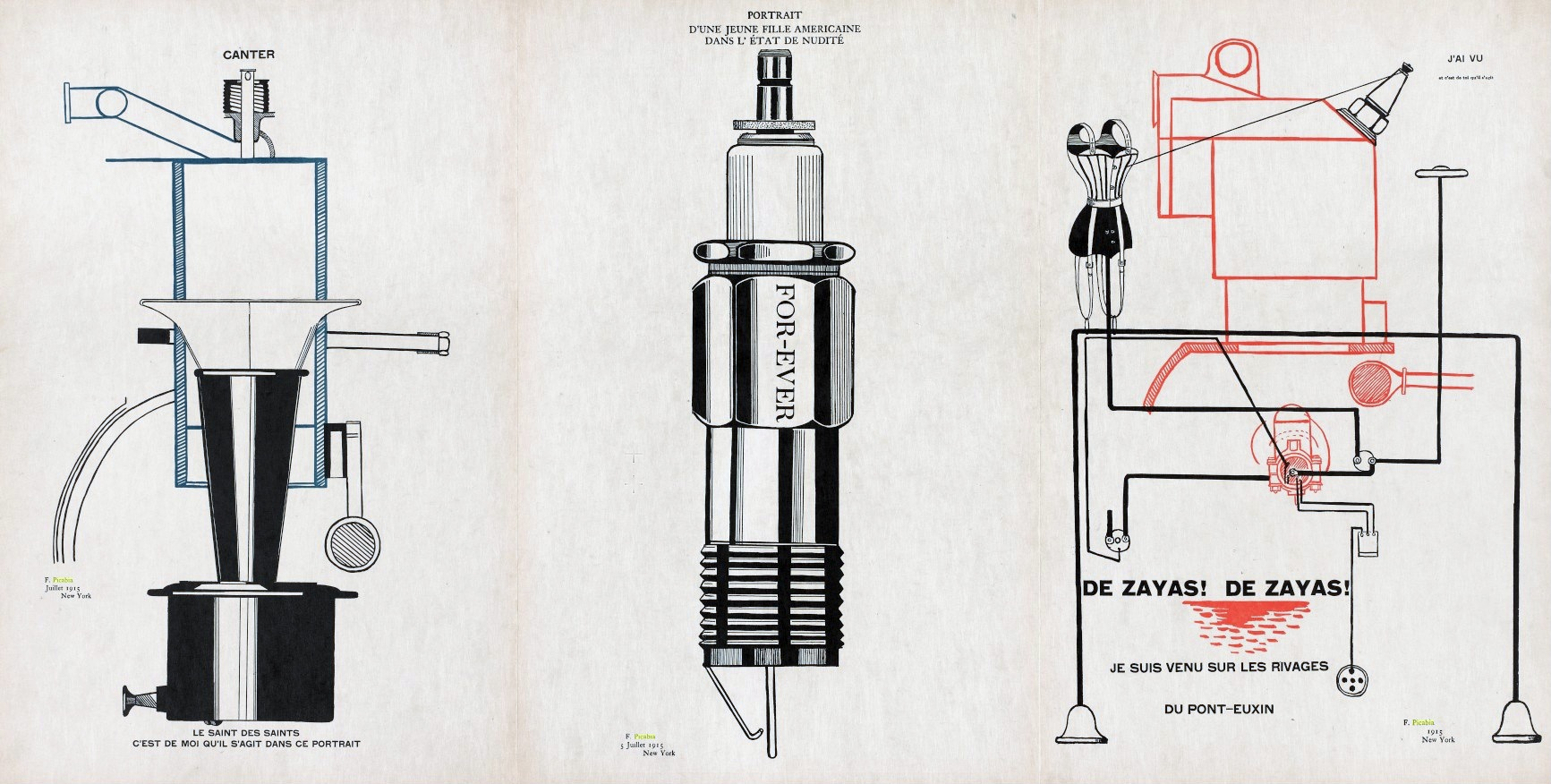
Francis Picabia, (Left) Le saint des saints c'est de moi qu'il s'agit dans ce portrait, 1 July 1915; (center) Portrait d'une jeune fille americaine dans l'état de nudité, 5 July 1915: (right) J'ai vu et c'est de toi qu'il s'agit, De Zayas! De Zayas! Je suis venu sur les rivages du Pont-Euxin, New York, 1915

=== Francis Picabia ===
Francis Picabia was arguably the first of the "New York Dadaists." According to Hans Richter, Picabia was driven by "an absolute lack of respect for all values, a freedom from all social and moral constraints, a compulsive urge to destroy everything that had hitherto been given the name of art." As with Duchamp, Picabia was escaping the first World War, but he was also attempting to find an avenue for his artistic philosophy that utilized the achievements of early modern art in France while simultaneously distancing himself from them. For Picabia, New York was liberating in this regard. During his time in New York Picabia participated in riotous orgies of sex and drugs, while attempting to iron out his (anti-)artistic style. While in New York, "he gave up the Cubist style completely and began to produce the images of satiric, machine like contrivances that are his chief contribution to Dadaism."

=== Marcel Duchamp ===
Marcel Duchamp is considered one of the most influential artists of the 20th century. Beginning with his "Nude Descending a Staircase" which was exhibited at the famous Armory show of 1913, his work became well known and controversial across the New York, as well as American in general, art scene. His personality was equally intoxicating as his art; according to Richter, "Duchamp's attitude is that life is a melancholy joke, an indecipherable non-sense, not worth the trouble of investigating. To his superior intelligence the total absurdity of life, the contingent nature of a world denuded of all values, are logical consequences of Descartes's Cogito ergo sum." Most famous amongst the works created by Duchamp in the New York period were his ready-mades, particularly the piece entitled Fountain. During his time in New York he maintained very close connections with both Stieglitz and the Arensbergs and was able to work on his mammoth project entitled "Large Glass".

=== Man Ray ===
Man Ray, 1920, The Coat-Stand (Porte manteau), reproduced in New York dada (magazine), Marcel Duchamp and Man Ray, April, 1921

The most prominent of all the American Dadaists, Man Ray created in a number of different mediums. Born in Philadelphia, he is a native artist amongst the New York Dadaists. Man Ray's style is a merger of mediums; his paintings, sculptures, photographs, and various constructions appear to be intertwined manifestations of all of these mediums in one. One of the ways that he managed to achieve this effect was with a purposefully careless looking way that he constructed his art.

== Politics ==
Discussing the politics of Dada is often as contentious as the very politics under discussion. One of the major debates revolves around the question of art/anti-art (which inevitably leads to debates around the essence of "art" itself). It is fair to say that the Dadaists, and again it is important to reiterate that the Dadaists were only aligned in their rejection of alignment. "If 'Dada' had any attraction for them, it was taken as a call for freeing themselves of any movement, and not as a label for yet another movement.". They were "anti-art," if we take art to be a historically identifiable sociological category of human creative activity. In other words, they were against the bourgeois epoch of "art," as well as those epochs that failed to achieve the frenzied critical representation of society that the Dadaists fed off of and built themselves. Therefore, it is no contradiction to say (or it is a productive contradiction in a dialectical sense) that New York Dada was Anti-Art-Art; their art was an anti-"art" (that is, the art they attempted to overcome). It is evident from the question of art as it appeared to the Dadaists and as their manifesto's described, that art is inherently a political concept, that the creation of art must be a critical practice. This is why the ready-mades were so baffling, they manage to contain the entire critical contradictory thrust of Dada in one fell prefabricated swoop.

== Sources ==
- Naumann, Francis M. (1994). New York Dada, 1915–23. New York: Abrams. ISBN 0-8109-3676-3.
- Richter, Hans; Britt, David (1997). Dada, Art and Anti-art. New York, New York: Thames and Hudson.
