= René Steinke (author) =

American novelist

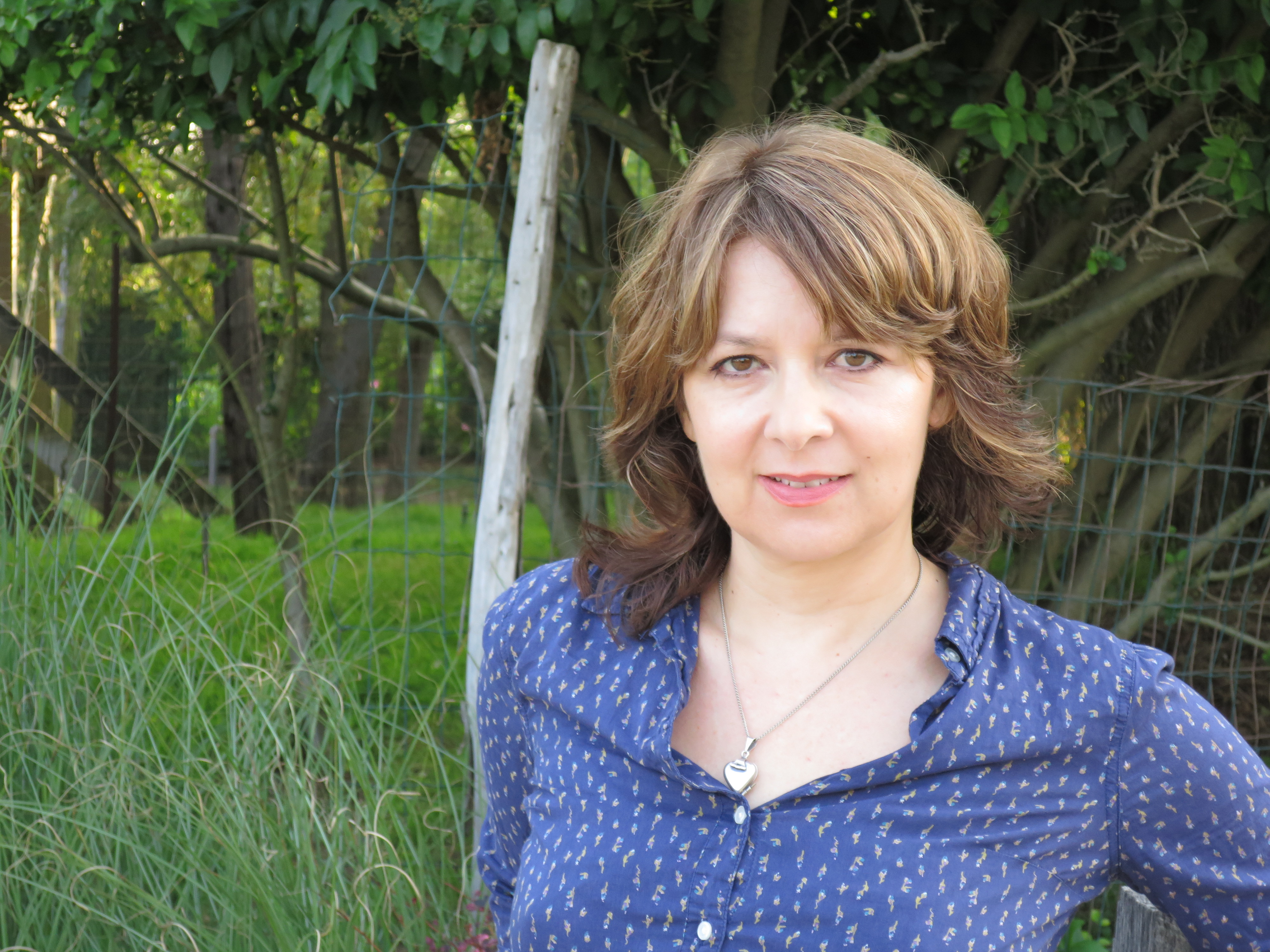
Steinke in 2014

René Steinke is an American novelist. She is the author of three novels: The Fires (1999), Holy Skirts (2005), and Friendswood (2014). Holy Skirts, a novel based on the life of the Baroness Elsa von Freytag-Loringhoven, was a finalist for the 2005 National Book Award. Her essays and articles have appeared in The New York Times, Vogue, O: the Oprah Magazine, Bookforum, and elsewhere.

Steinke holds a BA from Valparaiso University, an MFA from the University of Virginia, and a PhD in English from the University of Wisconsin–Milwaukee. She was the Director of the MFA Program in Creative Writing at Fairleigh Dickinson University. Until 2007, Steinke was Editor in Chief of The Literary Review, where she now holds the position Editor-at-Large. Her cousin Darcey Steinke is also an author. Rene Steinke lives in Brooklyn.

Steinke received a fellowship at the John Simon Guggenheim Memorial Foundation for Friendswood in 2016.
