= Human rights in Namibia =

Human rights in Namibia are currently recognised and protected by the Namibian constitution formed in 1990 by a 72-seat assembly. The assembly consisted of differing political parties. After a draft, the constitution was agreed upon by all members of the seven political parties involved. 21 March 1990 marks the first day Namibia operated under the Constitution and also marks the recognition of Namibia as an independent nation. Chapter 3 of the constitution entitled Fundamental Human Rights and Freedoms, also referred to as the Bill of Rights, outlines the human rights of all Namibian citizens.

== Overview of the Bill of Rights ==
The third chapter in the constitution recognises several human rights. Article 5, the first in the chapter, stipulates that all rights outlined by the constitution must be observed by all facets of the Namibian government. The following articles in the chapter, 6-25, state these rights and are outlined below.

The opening articles state that all persons have the right to liberty, respect, and dignity and no one will be subject to torture or inhumane environments at any time in their life. This includes the abolishment of slavery and forced labour. Along with this, the constitution stipulates that all Namibians will be considered equal and will not be subject to inequality by factors such as sex, race, colour and ethnicity, religious beliefs and status in society.

The constitution also protects citizens against certain authoritative actions such as unwarranted arrests. It is also important that if arrests are conducted that fair and timely communication is placed as paramount importance and is given in the language of preference of the arrestee. After arrest Namibians have the right to a fair trial conducted by a competent court in a public hearing however, juvenile cases are exempt.

Namibia is a democratic society and as such the constitution outlines rights Namibians hold under this. Privacy and family is respected and the marriage of a man and women is free and consensual. Namibians have the right to freely join political parties, engage in appropriate political activity and vote. Fundamental freedoms surrounding speech, culture, thought and associations in a democratic society are also outlined. Any limitations in the constitution shall not undermine an individual's rights.

Whilst children have been exempt from previous articles in the constitution, Article 15 recognises children's rights by highlighting their right to name and nationality as well as the need to be cared for by parents. Education is also compulsory for children until age 16.

The constitution not only focuses on equality and discrimination but also recognises the rights of people to own and dispose of property that can also be entrusted to others at any stage.

Interestingly, the human rights in the constitution are protected and no law is to be created by parliament that abolishes these rights or undermines them. All administrative bodies and officials must adhere and reasonably follow the rules and tasks of the body.

== Office of Ombudsman ==
The Office of the Ombudsman is a fundamental role in maintaining the rights outlined in the bill. The Ombudsman Act of 1990 is included in the constitution. One of the focuses of the Ombudsmen and the office is to uphold the freedom and rights of the people in Namibia. The mandate states that any violations of human rights must be recognised by the office and the Ombudsman must protect the people against further infringements.

The mission statement from the office of the ombudsman is as follows:

“… strives to promote and protect human rights, fair and effective administration, combat corrupt practices … of Namibia through the independent and impartial investigation and resolution of complaints and through raising awareness.”

Investigation across a range of human rights infringements have occurred since 2005. A notable inquiry of the office was a look into conditions in prison holding cells.

The office also facilitates complaints from society in regards to breaches of human rights from governing bodies. In 2016 alone, the office received 301 human rights complaints. Investigations showed that police were the main topic of complaints. Not all complaints processed through the office are related to human rights other issues can involve: environment, maladministration, and corruption.

== Civil and political rights ==
=== Women's rights ===
The Namibian constitution stipulates that all people regardless of being male or female are considered equal in the law. Namibia is ranked 115th in the world when analysing gender inequality index of 0.472. Regardless of these rights and the acknowledgment of the index, Namibian women are still subject to gender-based violence and discrimination in the workforce and can face issues accessing education and healthcare.

Even since the introduction of the constitution in 1990 women have still been subject to violence and rape. In 2000 the Combating of Rape Act was introduced that protects both males and females. However, years later women still are victim in majority of rape crimes. In November 2018, it was reported that 1 in 3 women aged 15–49 have experienced violence from their spouse and 29.5% of men believe physical abuse towards their wife is acceptable. Women of Namibia who suffer injury, mental health illness' and pregnancy from rape are subject to increased healthcare costs and decrease earnings as they take time to recover.

Namibia has recognised the inequality towards women and are committed to change. The 2015 deputy prime minister spoke at the 2015 Global Leaders Meeting and promised that Namibia was committed to embracing the critical role of women in society.

=== Capital punishment ===
The death sentence punishment is a breach of human rights in Namibia under the 1990 constitution. The last known execution was in 1988 and occurred when the country was under South African Rule.

== Children's rights ==
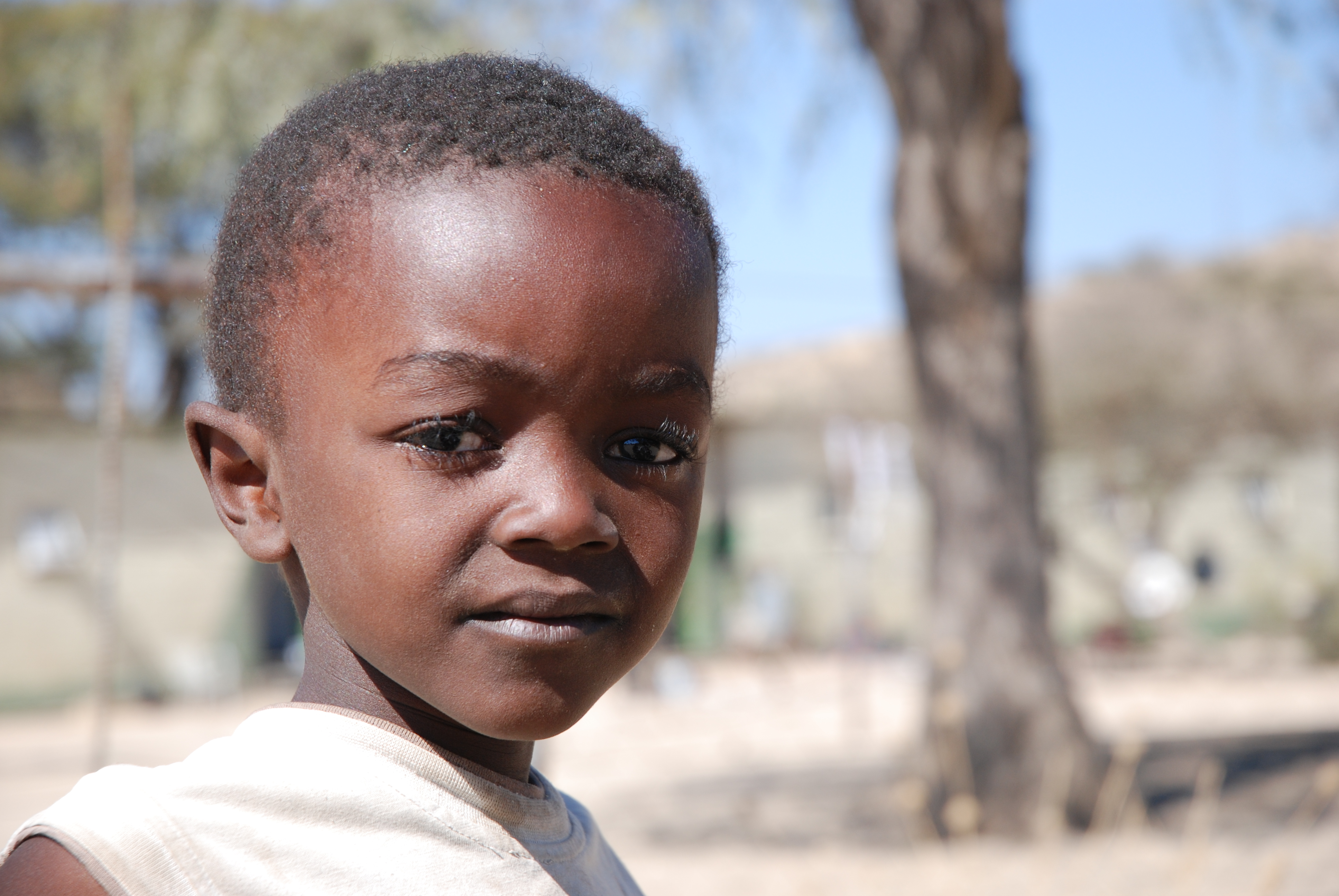
Children of Namibia face human rights issues that effect their health and safety.

Children's rights in Namibia are recognised in article 15 of the constitution and are in accordance with the 54 articles of the United Nations Convention on the Right of the Child (CRC). The country has operated under the CRC since 28 September 1990 and the day is always commemorated each year at schools in Namibia under different themes. In 2026, the day is commemorated under the theme:”Safe homes, Safe schools and Safe communities”. The current Realisation of Children's Rights Index is 7.39/10. Whilst Children's rights are recognised in Namibia there is violation present in society.

Under the CRC and the Bill of Rights Article 15, every child has the right to be identified and acquire nationality. Currently, 1 in 3 births is not recognised and thus these children face the issue of not being able to access welfare and safe education.

Child abuse, as recognised by the World Health Organisation, is present in Namibia and believed to be accepted as a childhood norm by society.

Child labour and exploitation in the workforce is one of the biggest violations of children's human rights. Although Namibia introduced the 2007 Labour Act which prohibits child labour, industries such as sex work and agriculture violate these laws. The 2009 report 'Findings on the Worst Forms of Child Labour' conducted for Namibia by the U.S Department of Labour, highlighted issues such as physical and sexual abuse towards children by their employers. The report also highlighted that 91.4% of child labour was within the agriculture industry. The U.S Department of Labor produced a 2017 report that again found sex and agriculture exploitation to be the worst forms of child labour.

Another issue affecting children throughout Namibia is their access to health care and poor condition of health which is violating their rights. The nation's children face issues surrounding malnutrition and the HIV/AIDS epidemic. In 2017, the Ministry of Health reported that 80% of all child admissions to hospitals, discovered malnutrition in the patient. Malnutrition accounts for 6000 child deaths yearly.

In 2012 UNICEF stated that 18 000 children were living with AIDS, with mother to child transmission at blame. The AIDS epidemic is so prevalent in Namibia that approximately 50% of orphaned children have not been able to be adequately cared for by their parents due to death or illness from AIDS.

== Treatment of minority groups ==
=== LGBT rights ===
Currently, Namibia does not recognise the rights of those who identify as lesbian, gay, bisexual or transgender (LGBT). Whilst Namibians are protected by the constitution to not face torture as a result of punishment or discrimination, LGBT individuals experience violence from all aspects of society, in particular police personnel. In 2009 only 55% of the nation was comfortable with having a person of LGBT identity as their neighbour.

Currently sodomy is prohibited. However, intercourse between females is legal. Namibia is looking at a change to its constitution that ensures that no discrimination based upon sexual orientation occurs, as the current laws do not include this.

OutRight Namibia, is the largest LGBT NGO in Namibia and fights for the rights of the LGBT community acting as a voice and organising public awareness events such as parades.

=== Indigenous people ===
The constitution of Namibia considers the right all people in Namibia regardless of ethnic origin and race however, it does not consider the human rights of individual indigenous groups. As of current, particular groups face extreme struggles in regards to the rights to traditional land. The indigenous groups of Namibia account for 8% of the population with the main groups being the San, the Nama, the Ovahimba, the Ovazemba, the Ovatjimba and the Ovatwa.

In the 2016 report for the Committee on Economic, Social and Cultural Rights, it was reported that indigenous communities are alienated and marginalised and struggle to access important things such as education and healthcare. These communities are dependent upon their land and tradition. However, many now are being denied access to traditional land. In 2012, the Ovahimba and Ovazemba faced near destruction of their land for the purpose of building a dam without any notice.

Access to adequate education and healthcare is another challenge faced by the indigenous of Namibia. Since the constitution in 1990, the healthcare rates for tribes such as the San have decreased. Their literacy rate is 23% which is significantly lower than that of the rest of the nation who have an average rate of 66%. This is directly linked to the alarmingly low number of secondary education enrolment which currently is 1%.

== Human rights organisations and bodies ==
=== NamRights ===
NamRights was established in 1989 by human rights activist Phil Ya Nangoloh. Previously known as the National Society for Human Rights, the organisation is concerned with the way in which the nation and State adhere to human rights as outlined in the constitution. It recognises that the government endorses human rights however, the non-profit organisation believes that the state has failed to uphold human rights with consistent violation. One of their concerns surrounds the torture and treatment of those detained in prison cells. NamRights has a strong presence in society, often cited in the Namibian.

=== Legal Assistance Centre (LAC) ===
The Legal Assistance Centre (LAC) was founded in 1988 with the intention to support those suffering in the time of Apartheid where many Namibians had very few human rights. The LAC describes itself as human rights law firm. Since the opening of the Windhoek office in 1998, the organisation has expanded and now also focuses on human rights education and training, informing and offering advice to the public, research and advocacy and litigation. To uphold their status of a public interest law firm, the LAC will only support cases when it has a greater effect on a community.

Throughout history, the organisation has faced scrutiny, however, as human rights in Namibia become more established the LAC is becoming more acclaimed. Not long after their opening in 1998, the government, then under South African control attempted to close the firm. However, today the firm is highly acclaimed with awards such as the Freedom of Expression Special Award and the JP Karuaihe Award for Social Responsibility being granted to the firm. Over the last 10 years the organisation has supported many human rights campaigns and programmes such as the Orphan and Vulnerable Children Programme.
