= Namibia's Rainbow Project =

Non-governmental organisation advocating for LGBT rights and acceptance in Namibia

- Abbreviation: TRP
- Formation: 1996
- Type: Non-governmental organisation

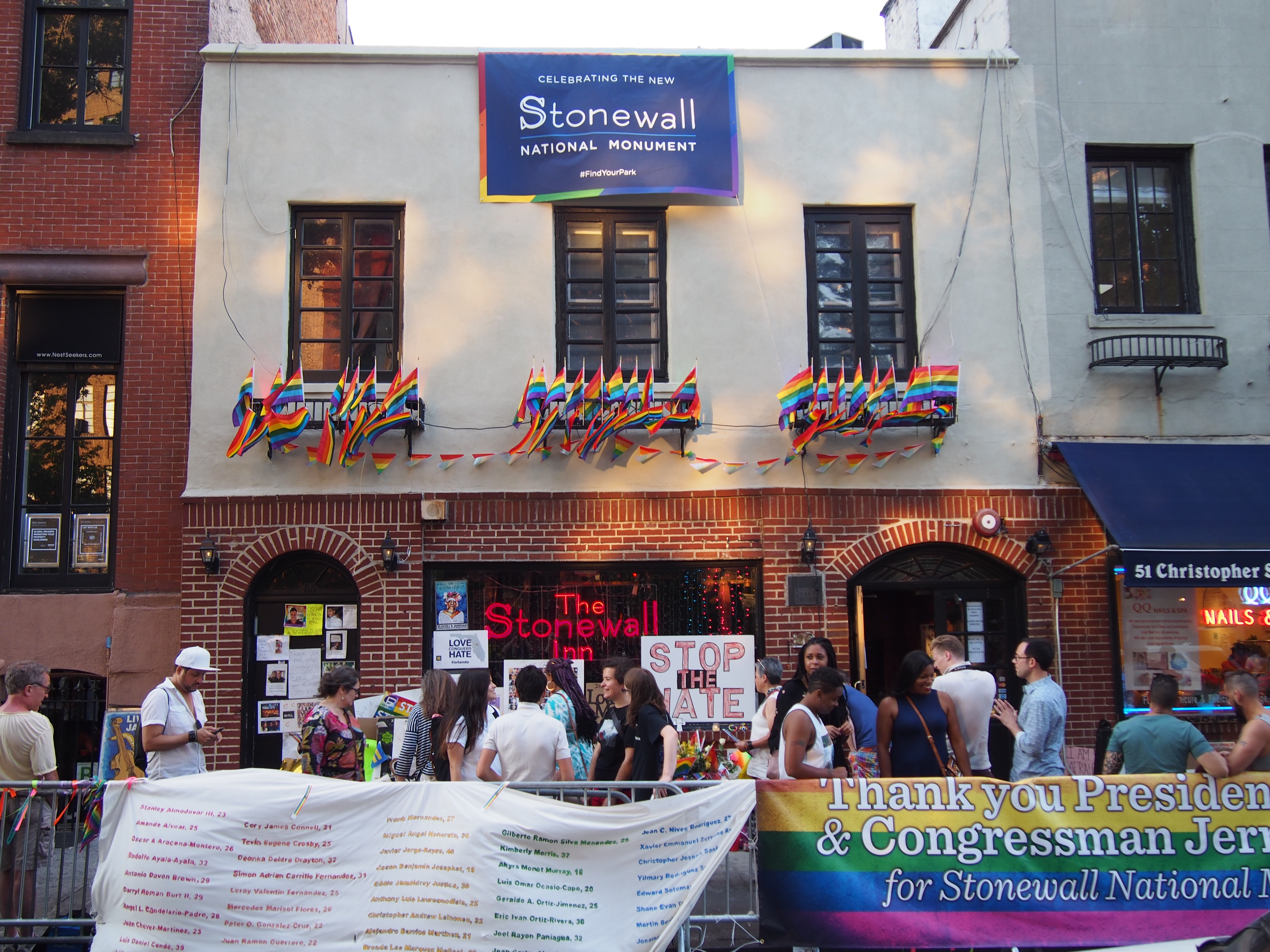
Stone wall Rainbow society

The Rainbow Project (TRP) was a non-governmental organisation advocating for LGBT rights and acceptance in Namibia. It provided resources to marginalised communities and worked to counter homophobia and discrimination against sexual minorities in the Namibian community. At its inception, TRP was the only organisation of its kind to focus on injustice against and abuse of sexual minorities in the country; this contrasted with other prominent Namibian LGBT organisations, such as Sister Namibia, which primarily supported lesbians.

TRP focused on distributing resources throughout the LGBT community, including education, social services and suicide-prevention counselling. It conducted advocacy work, and began documenting hate crimes against sexual minorities in 2006. The TRP worked to remove negative stereotypes of the community. Notable examples include responding to official government reports demonstrating that heterosexuals engaging in unprotected intercourse are the main transmitters of HIV in Namibia and promoting HIV–AIDS prevention strategies which are sensitive to the experiences of sexual minorities, free of homophobic misinformation.

== Origins ==
From 1915 to 1989, Namibia was governed by South Africa; under that country's apartheid government, homosexuality was condemned. When Namibia became independent and SWAPO came to power, LGBT Namibians hoped that they would finally be able to live in peace. Although SWAPO had a political platform of "equality for all Namibians", LGBT people were not granted equality under their leadership.

In 1996, the Rainbow Project was formed in response to what was seen as SWAPO's political homophobia. Ashley Currier described SWAPO's discrimination as directed against the LGBT community and women, characterising their leadership as "masculinist", with political homophobia a tactic permitting maintenance of the status quo. TRP collaborated with Sister Namibia to respond to public attacks (verbal and physical) on sexual minorities in the country, developing networks with international human-rights and LGBT organisations to draw national attention to the "invisibility" of their community. Although social and economic "material realities of extremely high HIV prevalence, sexual violence, gender inequality, tribalism and underemployment" were experienced to some degree by most Namibians, their impact was compounded for the LGBT community.

TRP's founders were primarily white and coloured LGBT, middle-class, non-Namibians. By 1997 the organisation's membership was mainly young, black, unemployed Namibians, and many of the original white and coloured members drifted away. With economic challenges an issue for more members at this time, debates began about whether TRP should expand its social services or devote limited resources to launching public legal-reform campaigns. The following year, affinity groups were formed in TRP to meet specific member needs; they included the Women's Caucus (later known as the Different Identities Group), the Male Think Tank, and the Rainbow Youth.

== LGBT advocacy ==
TRP's advocacy began with public protests and press conferences to address the government's anti-homosexuality, hosting public coming out testimonials to encourage "open sexual expression in the broader Namibian society." The organisation began holding public forums during the annual Namibian Human Rights Awareness Week in 2000.

=== Talking Pink ===
TRP's Talking Pink was an award-winning weekly radio show which featured LGBT issues. In 1999, after Minister of Home Affairs Jerry Ekandjo said that there were no homosexuals in Namibia, the show broadcast an episode with a recording of Ekandjo's claim followed by a recording of "TRP members declaring their ethnic and sexual identities". Talking Pink later became a vehicle for introducing Namibian communities to LGBT-themed films.

=== Anti-sodomy legal reform campaign ===
At a 1998 meeting, TRP began organising their first public legal-reform campaign to address the decriminalisation of sodomy; according to the organisation, the law against sodomy was "inherited from the colonial regime". LGBT activists from South Africa's National Coalition for Gay and Lesbian Equality (NCGLE) collaborated with TRP to develop a plan for the campaign in light of Namibia's volatile political climate regarding LGBT-identified people. TRP was also consulted by Namibia's Legal Assistance Centre on how best to proceed with their campaign. The LAC, initially on behalf of TRP, worked to clarify the Namibian prosecutor's interpretation and enforcement of anti-sodomy laws. The centre later continued the public campaign without TRP, since the latter's visibility made them targets for SWAPO's increasing anti-gay antagonism.

SWAPO members' hostility toward the LGBT community, ranging from threats to increased penalties for sodomy and calls for the police to "eliminate homosexuals from Namibia", increased from 1998 through 2000. In light of the SWAPO response, the public campaign was reduced to compelling public officials to clarify how the law would be enforced. As recently as 2006, however, TRP director Ian Swartz continued to publicly condemn the nation's criminalisation of sodomy: "The government should be taken to court over male-to-male sodomy legislation ... How is it that with a history like ours where people were dehumanised, we — 15 years after independence — still have a situation where government decides who you should have sex with, and criminalises sexual behaviour between two consenting adults?"

=== Combatting SWAPO anti-homosexuality ===
In an August 26, 2005 Heroes’ Day speech, Namibian deputy minister of home affairs and immigration Teopolina Mushelenga said that "lesbians and gay men betrayed the fight for Namibian freedom, are responsible for the HIV/AIDS pandemic, and are an insult to African culture". Outright International, an international LGBTQ human-rights organisation based in New York City, reported that three organisations – the Gays and Lesbians of Zimbabwe (GALZ), Sister Namibia, and TRP – issued individual responses to Mushelenga's speech. On September 8 of that year, TRP's statement condemned Mushelenga's speech as a "direct attack against the civil rights of the lesbian, gay, bisexual and transgender (LGBT) people of Namibia". The organisation called for the resignations of the minister and Namibian president Hifikepunye Pohamba, saying that Mushelenga's endorsement of homophobia posed a threat to all Namibians.

TRP issued a July 2006 statement condemning former SWAPO president Sam Nujoma, who called National Society for Human Rights founder and director Phil ya Nangoloh "homosexual". When they were in power, SWAPO carried out government-sanctioned repression of LGBT-identified and -suspected individuals across Namibia. TRP said that Nujoma's use of "homosexual" to refer to ya Nangoloh was an attempt to use him "as a scapegoat to avert attention from the current controversies within the SWAPO Party", appealing to Pohamba to condemn the verbal attack and "maintain his government’s pro-human rights stance".

== Contributions ==
TRP opened and operated a homeless shelter, resource centre, and soup kitchen to address the social and economic hardship of the Rainbow Youth. From the late 1990s to 2007, the soup kitchen was open twice a week and served the majority young, black and unemployed membership. The resource centre provided and maintained entertainment materials and a collection of literature on safe-sex practices, HIV/AIDS, and international LGBT human-rights organisations. It held organisational meetings, public forums and coming-out testimonials, community social events, and empowerment workshops on sexual and gender identity, self-esteem and body image. In 2007, due to its use by non-LGBT-identified homeless youth, the shelter was closed.

Empowerment workshops led by TRP featured self-awareness training, which consisted of "teaching how to distinguish between lesbian, gay, bisexual and transgender identities; exploring ideas of traditional homosexuality in ethnic identity terms; reconciling being lesbian or gay and Christian; and encouraging open discussion about sexual desires in order to combat vulnerability to HIV infection". At the workshops, the public telling (and retelling) of coming-out stories took place for the Rainbow Youth.

Workshops dealing with the societal tension between religious and sexual identities and religious persecution lead to the 2003 creation of the Namibian Assistance Project. Through this initiative, in partnership with Inclusive and Affirming Ministries, TRP "offered Christian religious training to help ease the moral uncertainties between sexual and Christian identities". TRP community social events, like their movie nights, were attended by women who did not identify as LGBT because they provided an enjoyable, safe space where they would not be bothered by heterosexual men.

== Challenges ==
Although TRP provided workshops, literature, and counselling to encourage safe-sex practices among LGBT-identified Namibians, it was argued that lack of information could not be considered the sole deterrent to safer sex. Unravelling Taboos: Gender and Sexuality in Namibia's authors wrote that the scarcity of economic resources, gender inequality and social stigma pose difficulties in practicing safer sex which are not addressed by TRP. The organisation's HIV-education work with LGBT youth encountered difficulty from men who self-identified as heterosexual while engaging in homosexual sex and refusing to wear condoms, because they believed that HIV was a disease which only homosexuals could contract.

== Criticism ==
Robert Lorway published Namibia's Rainbow Project in 2015, examining the unintended consequences of the organisation's neoliberal shift after 2007. TRP's principal donor was Hivos in the Netherlands; most of Hivos' leadership self-identified as coloured and white, university-educated South Africans, and TRP's Rainbow Youth was composed of poor, black Namibians without a university education. Lorway, a medical anthropologist working with the Rainbow Youth, wrote that the organisational shift was inconsistent with the concerns of TRP's members. He described a February 2008 meeting at which the Rainbow Youth aired grievances with the organisation's new direction of, writing that it did not produce the social and economic emancipation they sought. Lorway described the period as produced by "TRP's unwitting collusion with wider neoliberal power arrangements taking place in Southern Africa at the time", outlining the "unintended consequences" of TRP's LGBT intervention as "the pursuit of females to become 'like men' in order to escape sexual violence that leads to the intensification of their oppression at the hands of men; the longings for 'real men' by young feminine males who yearn for love, intimacy, and social acceptance that ends in their severe physical and sexual abuse; and the fetishisation of foreign and local gay elites by impoverished young males in search for greater social mobility and erotic freedom that results in the loss of the bargaining power during negotiations about safer sex".

In Out in Africa, Ashley Currier wrote that TRP and similar regional organisations could not function without these private, "northern" donors; they provided the resources to maintain safe spaces, which provided visibility for the community. To maintain this funding, however, the organisations were expected to adapt the "hierarchical structure and centralised decision-making" of Western NGOs to prove themselves worthy of funding (which made them less transparent to the communities they served). As the organisation focused on legal rights and recognition for LGBT people in Namibia, some local members criticised its shift from social work to political action.

== See also ==
- LGBT rights in Namibia
