= Coalition of African Lesbians =

Network of non-profit organizations

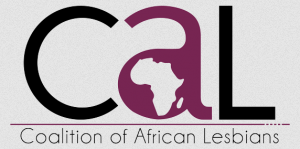
- Abbreviation: CAL
- Type: Nonprofit organisation
- Headquarters: Johannesburg, South Africa
- Key people: Brigdett Oliphant, Dorothy Aken’Ova, Liz Frank, Nikki Mawanda

The Coalition of African Lesbians (CAL) was a network that comprised 30 non-profit organisations that are spread across 19 different countries in the sub-Saharan region of Africa. Their collective network is centred around feminism, activism, and pan-Africanism. The mission of CAL was to progress the freedom, liberation, and autonomy for all women who reside in Africa or in any other part of the world. Additionally, CAL strives to advocate and build the capacities of lesbian women while promoting African agency. The group disbanded in 2022.

== History ==
The Coalition of African Lesbians was founded in 2003 at a meeting attended by a group of women, including Elizabeth Khaxas—a founder of Sister Namibia—from seven different African countries in Johannesburg, South Africa. It was originally under the name African Lesbian Alliance. In August 2004 in Windhoek, Namibia, the alliance met again with women from 14 different African countries in attendance, sponsored by The Rainbow Project and the Sister Namibia magazine. At this meeting, the organization's name changed to The Coalition of African Lesbians (CAL), and all of the participants were very strategic and adamant about advancing lesbian rights and placing power back into a women's ability to make choices for themselves, especially in regard to their sexual freedom. They were also focused on disseminating HIV information that would resonate and help keep lesbian, bisexual, and transgender women communities safe as they were often overlooked by prominent HIV/AID organizations. After the framework and clear agenda of CAL was established, the women representatives created a logo and website to brand the network, instituted a constitution, and facilitated elections for office bearers to transition away from a steering committee. The CAL also established their own publication, African Feminist Standpoint, which they describe as a “curated digital space for Radical African Lesbian Feminist (RALF) thought, words and artistic expression". The publication included poems, articles, personal essays, and opinions written for and by African women.

In 2010, the African Commission on Human and Peoples' Rights declined to give the CAL observer status and rejected the group's May 2008 application. The commission initially rejected the charter stating, "that, the activities of the said organisation do not promote and protect any of the rights enshrined in the African Charter". After the African Commission on Human and People's Rights refused to grant CAL observer status, many LGBTQ and human rights activists were extremely frustrated as that decision continued to put lesbian women and other LGBTQ members in danger. During this time, David Kato (a prominent Ugandan LGBTQ activist) was murdered and LGBTQ hate crimes were escalating, thus there was a genuine concern for people's safety. However, in 2014, the CAL submitted another application, which in 2015 was accepted. The Coalition of African Lesbians was finally extended observer status in April 2015. However, that transformative decision was not received well by certain members of the African Union due to the fact that the promotion LGBTQ rights and inclusion is still a controversial and debated topic within Africa. In 2018, the African Commission revoked the observer status of CAL, under pressure from the African Union's executive council. The Coalition of African Lesbians disbanded in 2022.

== Objectives ==
The Coalition of African Lesbians outlines several broad objectives within its 2006 constitution:

– To advocate and lobby for the equal political, sexual, cultural and economic rights of African lesbian, bisexual and trans diverse people by engaging strategically with African and international structures and allies;

– To eradicate stigma and discrimination against lesbians in Africa

– To build and strengthen our voices and visibility through research, media and publications, and through participation in local and international fora;

– To build the capacity of African lesbians and our organisations to use African radical feminist analysis as a means of understanding and challenging the discrimination and oppression we experience in all spheres of our lives;

– To build a strong and sustainable LBT coalition supporting the development of national organisations working on LBT issues in every country in Africa;

– To support the work of these national organisations in all the foregoing areas including the facilitation of the personal growth of African LBT people and the building of capacity within their organisations.
