= Lesbian =

Homosexual woman or girl

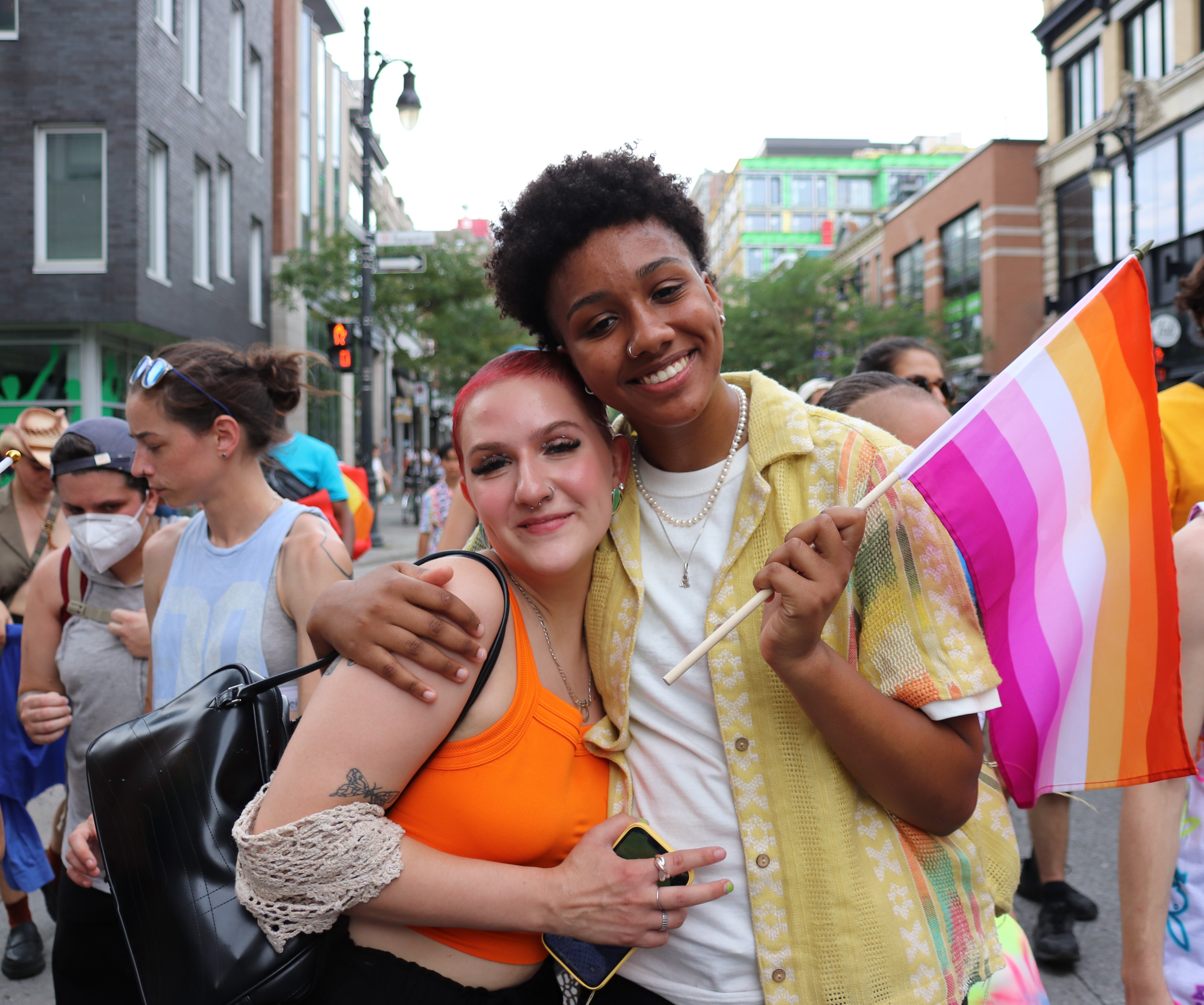
Two lesbians holding a lesbian pride flag at the 2022 Fierté Montréal march

Symbol for female homosexuality consisting of two intersecting female symbols

A lesbian is a homosexual woman or girl. The word is also used as an adjective for women in relation to their experiences, regardless of their sexual orientation; or as an adjective relating to female homosexuality.

The term lesbian is a derivative of the Greek island of Lesbos, home to the ancient poet Sappho. Relatively little in history was documented to describe women's lives in general or female homosexuality in particular. The earliest mentions of lesbianism date to around the 600s–500s BC, including Sappho's poetry.

Lesbian relationships and attractions, along with gender nonconforming behaviors more often displayed by lesbians, have been treated in different ways throughout different ages and cultures. While there is a long documented history of lesbian behavior and relationships throughout different cultures, the idea of a 'lesbian' as a category of person innately distinct from other women emerged in Europe around the turn of the 19th century. Lesbians' current rights vary widely worldwide, ranging from severe abuse and legal persecution to general acceptance and legal protections.

Modern polls estimate that 1 to 2% of women are lesbian. Lesbian social movements often advocate for legal changes (such as anti-discrimination protections, child custody protections, and legal civil unions or marriages), as well as for cultural, familial, and religious acceptance of lesbian orientations and relationships.

== Etymology ==
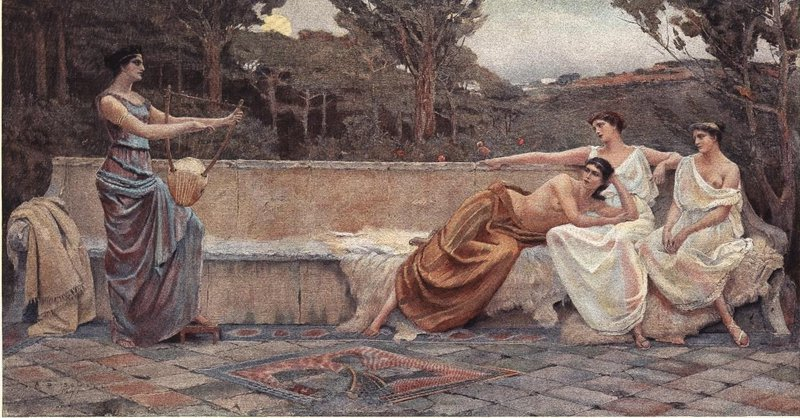
Sappho by Amanda Brewster Sewell, 1891 (Sappho of Lesbos gave the term lesbian the connotation of erotic desire between women)

The word lesbian is the demonym of the Greek island of Lesbos, home to the 6th-century BCE poet Sappho. Some of Sappho's surviving poetry discusses her love for other women.

Before the mid-19th century, the word lesbian referred to any aspect of Lesbos, including a type of wine. (Note: An attempt by natives of Lesbos (also called "Mytilene" in Greece) in 2008 to reclaim the word to refer only to people from the island was unsuccessful in a Greek court. Inhabitants of Lesbos claimed the use of lesbian to refer to female homosexuality violated their human rights and "disgrace[d] them around the world".) A shift of the word to describe erotic relationships between women had been documented in 1870. In 1875, a critic referred to Baudelaire's poem "Delphine and Hippolyte" (a poem about love between two women, and without reference to Lesbos) as "Lesbian". In 1890, the term lesbian was used in the National Medical Dictionary as an adjective to describe tribadism.

The terms lesbian, invert and homosexual were interchangeable with sapphist around the turn of the 20th century. The use of lesbian in medical literature became prominent; by 1925, the word was recorded as a noun to mean the female equivalent of sodomite.

== Sexuality and identity ==
Lesbian community flag introduced in social media in 2018, with the dark orange stripe representing gender variance

Lesbian feminist flag consisting of a labrys (a double-bladed axe) within the inverted black triangle, set against a violet-hue background. The labrys represents lesbian strength.

Lesbian flag derived from the colors of the lipstick lesbian flag design

=== Biological factors ===
Prenatal androgen exposure correlates with same-sex sexual behavior in women. Biological characteristics known to be affected by prenatal hormone exposure have been shown to vary by sexual orientation in women. The finding that digit ratios (one characteristic affected by prenatal hormone exposure) differ between lesbian and heterosexual women has been replicated in cross-cultural studies. Neuroimaging studies have found differences between heterosexual and homosexual women in neurological structures, including both those known to be affected by prenatal androgen exposure and those not known to be affected by prenatal androgen exposure. A later meta-analysis concluded that the small sample sizes and small number of studies meant that findings were inconclusive as of 2021. Genetics plays a role; around 20% of the variance of sexual orientation in women is controlled by genes.

=== Lesbian identity formation ===
When a woman realizes she is a lesbian, it may cause an "existential crisis". When a woman was raised in an environment with negative stereotypes of lesbians, she may need to work through these stereotypes and prejudices to come to terms with her orientation. Lesbians in modern times share an identity that parallels those built on ethnicity, including the concept of group heritage and group pride. Compared to gay men, lesbians more often developed their sexual self-concepts either alone or in intimate relationships, instead of in communities, and disclosed them less often.

=== Self-identification and behavior ===
Some women report a consistently lesbian orientation. Other women report varying degrees of fluidity in how they describe their sexual orientation. Women who identify as lesbians and report never having been with men may be referred to as "gold star lesbians." Women who identify as lesbians and had sex with men before coming out may face ridicule from other lesbians or identity challenges with regard to defining what it means to be a lesbian.

Several studies have found that the sexual behavior and attractions of exclusively lesbian women are significantly more likely to be aligned with their identity than those of exclusively heterosexual women. These included studies of reported attraction throughout the fertility cycle, and direct measures of arousal by different imagery.

Some lesbians also identify as non-binary or queer. Other lesbians find the term "queer" overly broad, inaccurate, or radically politically charged, or associate the word primarily with its use as a slur.

Some researchers observe that self-applied identity labels and reported sexual behavior do not always align: for example, some self-identified straight women report sex with women, and some self-identified lesbians report sex with men. Some women use the self-identifier "bisexual lesbian" when they are attracted to both sexes, but primarily to women.

=== Sexual activity ===
A 1983 survey asked couples "About how often during the last year have you and your partner had sex relations?". The survey found that long-term lesbian couples named lower numbers than long-term heterosexual or homosexual male couples. This conclusion became known as "lesbian bed death". Numerous critiques were leveled at the study, including that the language could be misinterpreted to mean "heterosexual intercourse", and that the survey sample was limited to a biased sample of self-identified lesbians in 1983.

Researchers report that lesbian and heterosexual women are just as likely to view achieving orgasm as important, and that the two groups report statistically equivalent rates of overall sexual and romantic satisfaction. The research suggests that lesbian women tend to achieve said satisfaction through higher quality rather than more frequent sex, and that they engage in different romantic and sexual scripts than heterosexual women.

== In history ==
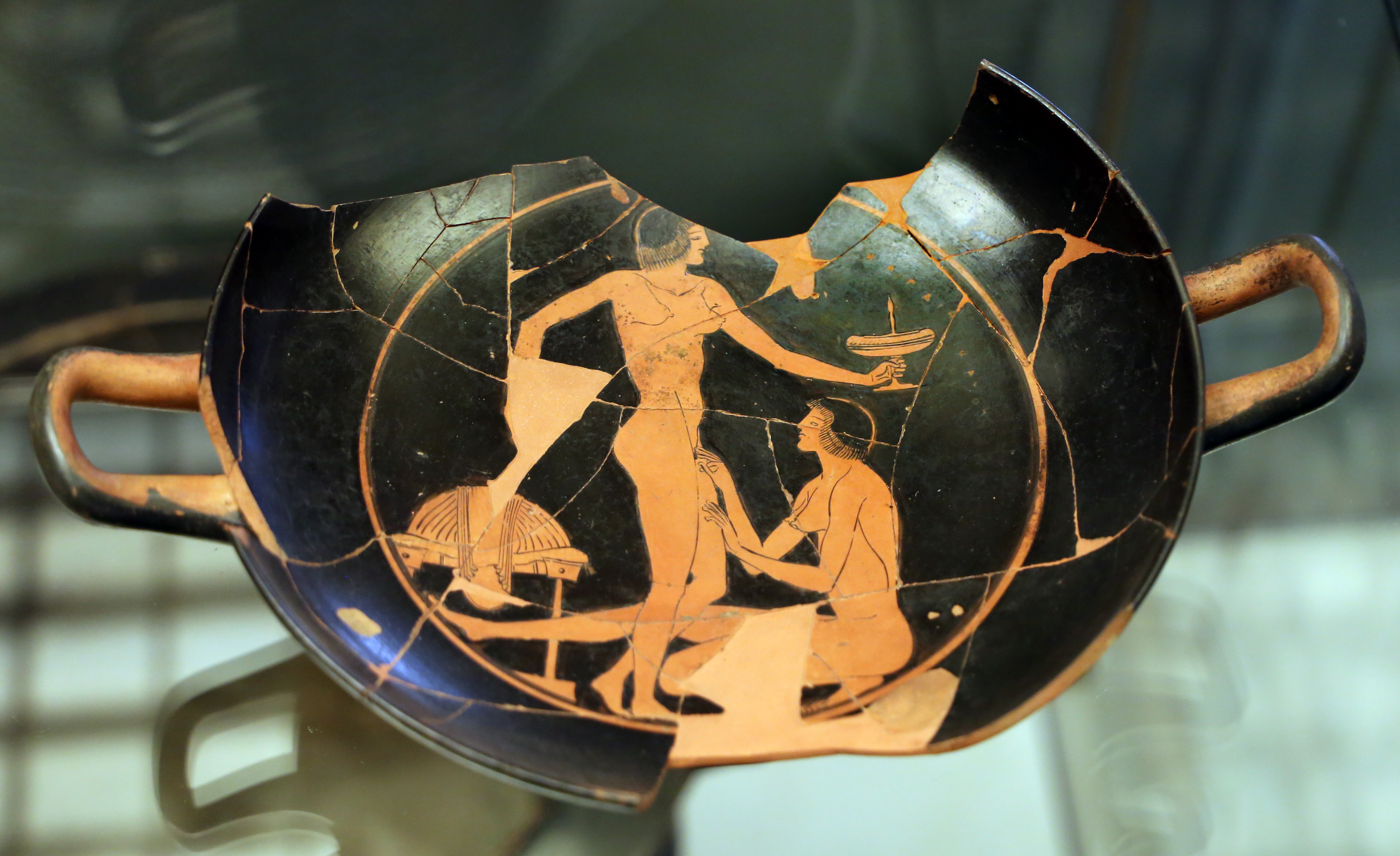
A red-figure kylix depicting two women in an intimate setting, attributed to the painter Apollodorus, c. 490–480 BCE (Tarquinia National Museum)

Women have been underrepresented in history as both writers and subjects, and lesbianism has been correspondingly under-recorded. Since the 1970s, efforts have been made to gather together and preserve lesbian history.

In ancient Greece, Sappho of Lesbos wrote poetry regarding her love for other women, fragments of which survive. Other Greek references include mentions in Plato's Symposium. (Note: "[H]e begins by treating of the origin of human nature. The sexes were originally three, men, women, and the union of the two; and they were made round—having four hands, four feet, two faces on a round neck, and the rest to correspond. Terrible was their strength and swiftness; and they were essaying to scale heaven and attack the gods. Doubt reigned in the celestial councils; the gods were divided between the desire of quelling the pride of man and the fear of losing the sacrifices. At last Zeus hit upon an expedient. Let us cut them in two, he said; then they will only have half their strength, and we shall have twice as many sacrifices. He spake, and split them as you might split an egg with an hair; and when this was done, he told Apollo to give their faces a twist and re-arrange their persons, taking out the wrinkles and tying the skin in a knot about the navel. The two halves went about looking for one another, and were ready to die of hunger in one another's arms. Then Zeus invented an adjustment of the sexes, which enabled them to marry and go their way to the business of life. Now the characters of men differ accordingly as they are derived from the original man or the original woman, or the original man-woman. Those who come from the man-woman are lascivious and adulterous; those who come from the woman form female attachments; those who are a section of the male follow the male and embrace him, and in him all their desires centre.")

In ancient Rome, accounts of lesbian characters include the story of Iphis and Ianthe, a myth from fabulist Phaedrus, and Lucian's Dialogues of the Courtesans.

In the Aztec Empire, female homosexuality is described in the Florentine Codex, a 16th-century study of the Aztec world, including its violent repression during Spanish colonization. Some Indigenous peoples of the Americas conceptualize a third gender for women who dress as, and fulfill the roles of men or a third sex in their cultures.

In early Modern western literature, homoerotic masquerade of one gender for another to seduce an unsuspecting woman was a common plot device, seen for instance in Twelfth Night (1601), The Faerie Queene (1590), and The Bird in a Cage (1633). From the 17th to the 19th centuries in the West, it was fashionable, accepted, and encouraged for a woman to express passionate love for another woman.

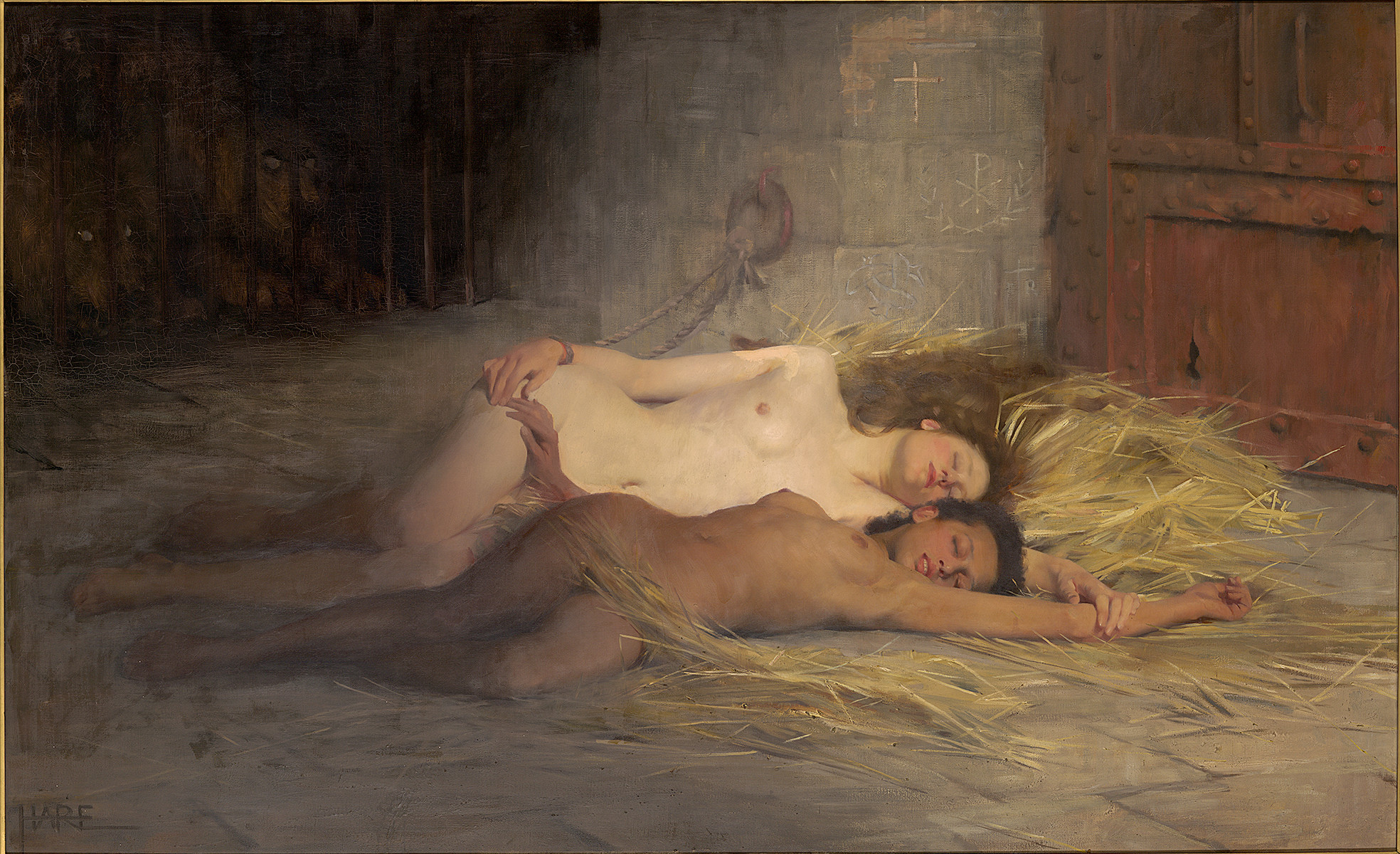
The Victory of Faith by Saint George Hare, 1891 (the painting has been described by Kobena Mercer as depicting an interracial lesbian couple, likening it to Les Amis by Jules Robert Auguste)

In the 19th and 20th centuries, sexologists Richard von Krafft-Ebing from Germany and Britain's Havelock Ellis created categorizations of female same-sex attraction, approaching it as a form of insanity. In the 1920s, Berlin had a vibrant homosexual culture with some 50 clubs for lesbians. In 1928, Radclyffe Hall published the novel The Well of Loneliness, intended as a call for tolerance. Professor Laura Doan described the resulting trial for obscenity as "the crystallizing moment in the construction of a visible modern English lesbian subculture".

In the United States, the 1920s was a decade of sexual experimentation. Homosexual subculture disappeared in Germany with the rise of the Nazis in 1933. Following World War II, the U.S. government began persecuting homosexuals around 1950. Between 1955 and 1969, over 2,000 books of lesbian pulp fiction were published in North America. From the late 1950s to the 1970s, the sexual revolution encouraged women to try varied sexual experiences.

In Latin America, lesbian subcultures increased as several countries transitioned to or reformed democratic governments. However, social harassment has remained common.

Cross-gender roles and marriage between women have been recorded in over 30 traditional African societies. In Africa, the Coalition of African Lesbians has worked since 2004 to eradicate stigma, legal discrimination, and violence against lesbians. In Africa, lesbian activities have been "shaped by silence and secrecy, oppression and repression".

Accounts of homoerotic relationships between women exist from various dynasties in premodern China; academics emphasize that the way society conceived of these relationships was not the same as in modern society.

== Demographics ==
=== Early reports ===
The most extensive early study of female homosexuality was the 1953 Kinsey Institute analysis of the sexual experiences of more than 8,000 American women. Its methodology has been criticized, but it proved popular. It reported that 28% of women had been aroused by a female, that 19% had had sexual contact with a female, and that some 9% had orgasmed. Its dispassionate discussion of homosexuality as a form of sexual behavior was revolutionary.

In 1976, sexologist Shere Hite did a qualitative survey of 3,019 women on their sexual experiences. Hite's questions focused on how women identified and what they preferred, rather than their prior experiences. Respondents indicated that 8% preferred sex with women, while 9% said that they identified as bisexual or had had sexual experiences with men and women without indicating a preference.

=== Population estimates ===
Studies Showing Rate of Lesbianism Among Women
| Date of sample | Sample Size | Area or Population | Item Being Studied | Percentage of Women Identified as Lesbian | Source |
|---|---|---|---|---|---|
| 2000 | - | USA | Self-identification as lesbian | 1.3% | |
| 2002 | 55,742 women | USA, aged 18-44 | Self-identification as lesbian | 1.3% | |
| 2002 | 55,742 women | USA, aged 18-44 | Self-reported attraction solely to women | .8% | |
| 2003 | - | Australia | Self-identification as lesbian | 1% | |
| 2003 | - | Australia | Self-identification as lesbian | 1.6% | |
| 2006-2008 | 56,032 women | USA, aged 18-44 | Self-identification as lesbian | 1.1% | |
| 2006-2008 | 56,032 women | USA, aged 18-44 | Self-reported attraction solely to women | .7% | |
| 2006-2010 | - | USA, aged 18-44 | Self-reported attraction exclusively to the same sex | .8% | |
| 2011-2015 | - | USA, aged 18-44 | Self-identification as lesbian | 1.6% | |
| 2011-2015 | - | USA, aged 18-44 | Self-reported attraction exclusively to the same sex | 1.1% | |
| 2012 | - | Israel | Self-identification as lesbian | 1.1% | |
| 2013 | - | Philippines | Self-identification as lesbian | 1.8% | |
| 2014-2015 | 11,435 total participants | New Zealand | Have only ever been attracted to other women | 1.6% | |
| 2015 | - | France, aged 20-29 | Self-identification as lesbian | ~1% (rounded to nearest whole number) | |
| 2015 | - | Chile, 18+ | Self-identification as lesbian | .6% | |
| 2017 | - | Chile, 18+ | Self-identification as lesbian | 1.1% | |
| 2021 | - | Sri Lanka | Self-identification as lesbian | 1% | |
| 2023 | - | France, aged 20-29 | Self-identification as lesbian | ~2% (rounded to nearest whole number) | |
| 2025 | - | USA, 18+ | Self-identification as lesbian | 2.3% | |

== Health ==
=== Disparities ===
A systematic review conducted in 2023 found that lesbian and bisexual women were 1.5 to 2 times more likely to have asthma than heterosexual women. Additionally, they were somewhat more likely to experience back pain, hepatitis B/C, and urinary tract infections. However, they were less likely to suffer from heart attacks, diabetes, or hypertension, possibly because they avoided pregnancy in the case of the latter two conditions. Due to lifestyle and social factors, lesbians may be at elevated risk of some types of cancers.

American studies in the 2010s and 2020s have found that LGBT people experience higher rates of mental distress, and that this relationship is mediated by experiences of rejection and adverse childhood experiences.

=== Factors ===
==== Lifestyle ====
Factors that add to risk of heart disease include the prevalence of obesity and smoking among lesbians. Lesbians are less concerned about weight issues than heterosexual women; and lesbians consider women with higher body masses to be more attractive than heterosexual women do. Lesbians are more likely to exercise regularly than heterosexual women.

==== Social ====
Lesbians experience negative social factors such as discrimination, stigma, and violence; policies that oppose their sexuality, such as access to marriage or employment; and lower incomes. Partly as a result, lesbians may be less likely to be in a marriage. These factors contribute to increased levels of chronic ill-health, increased misuse of alcohol and substances, reduced mobility, increased cardiovascular disease, chronic pain, and poor sleep.

Lesbians may fear doctors' attitudes to their sexuality. Lesbians perceive a lower risk of contracting sexually transmitted diseases, and may therefore miss routine screenings such as for cervical cancer.

== Media representation ==
The majority of media about lesbians has been produced by men; women's publishing companies did not develop until the 1970s, films about lesbians made by women did not appear until the 1980s, and women-written television shows portraying lesbians written only began to be created in the 21st century. When depictions of lesbians began to surface, they were often one-dimensional, simplified stereotypes.

=== Literature ===
Ancient lesbian writers include Sappho. (Note: Sappho has served as a subject of many works of literature by writers such as John Donne, Alexander Pope, Pierre Louÿs, and several anonymous writers, that have addressed her relationships with women and men. She has been used as an embodiment of same-sex desire, and as a character in fictions loosely based on her life.) Ancient stories interpreted as examples of lesbianism include the Book of Ruth, Camilla and Diana, Artemis and Callisto, and Iphis and Ianthe. For ten centuries after the fall of the Roman Empire, lesbianism disappeared from literature. Foster points to the particularly strict view that Eve—representative of all women—caused the downfall of mankind; original sin among women was a particular concern, especially because women were perceived as creating life. During this time, women were largely illiterate and discouraged from intellectual pursuit, and men shaped ideas about sexuality.

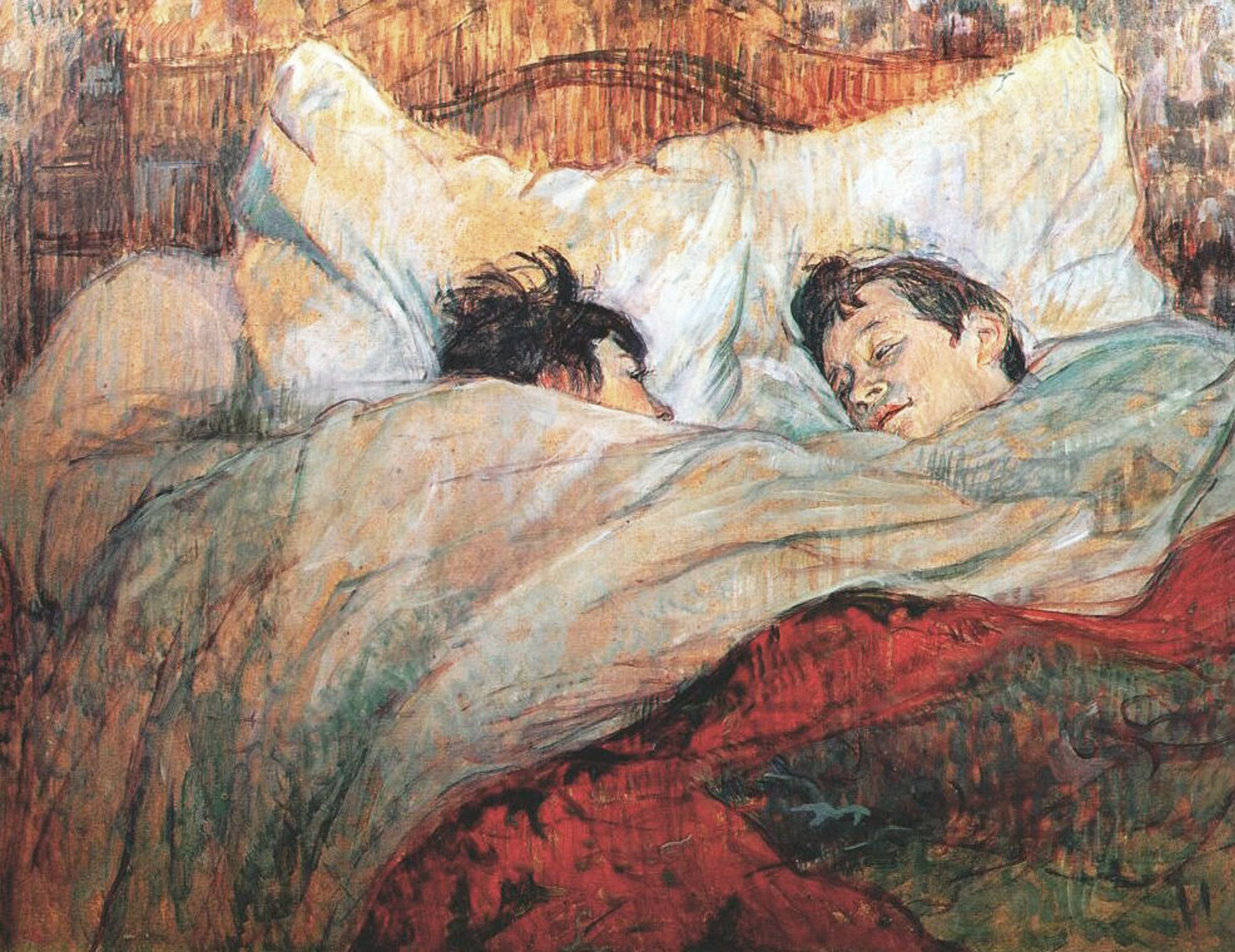
In Bed by Henri de Toulouse-Lautrec, 1893 (the artist employed the association between lesbianism and prostitution)

In the 15th and 16th centuries, French and English depictions of relationships between women, writers' attitudes spanned from amused tolerance to arousal. Physical relationships between women were often encouraged, as long as they did not supersede heterosexual relationships; there was a cultural belief that lesbian sex and relationships could not be as fulfilling as heterosexual sex and relationships. At worst, if a woman became enamored of another woman, she became a tragic figure. Male intervention into relationships between women was necessary only when women acted as men and demanded the same social privileges. In the 18th century, writings mentioning lesbianism included the 1749 English erotica Fanny Hill and the 1778 erotica L'Espion Anglais.

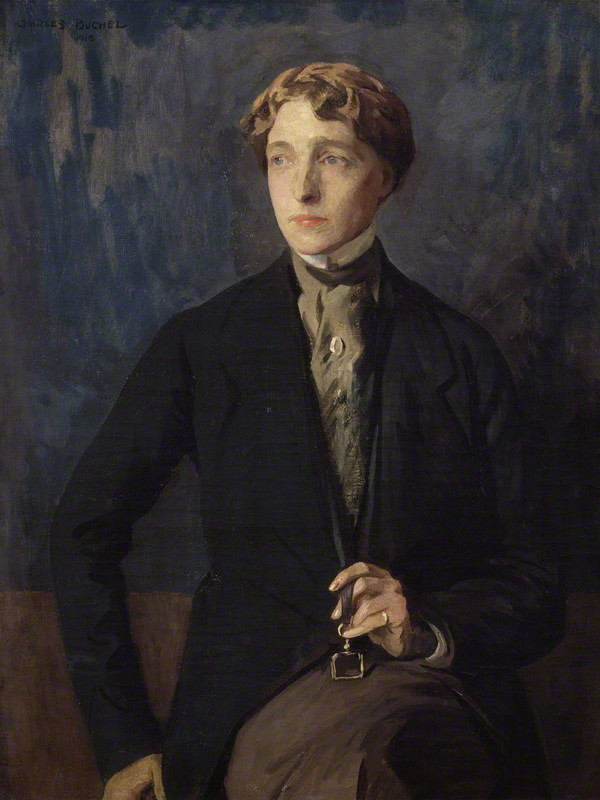
A portrait of English lesbian writer Radclyffe Hall by Charles Buchel, 1918

Lesbianism became almost exclusive to French literature in the 19th century, based on male fantasy and the desire to shock bourgeois moral values. Honoré de Balzac, in The Girl with the Golden Eyes (1835), employed lesbianism in his story about three people living amongst the moral degeneration of Paris, and again in later works. His work influenced novelist Théophile Gautier's Mademoiselle de Maupin, which provided the first description of a physical type that became associated with lesbians: tall, wide-shouldered, slim-hipped, and athletically inclined. Charles Baudelaire repeatedly used lesbianism as a theme in his poems "Lesbos", "Femmes damnées 1" ("Damned Women"), and "Femmes damnées 2". Reflecting French society, as well as employing stock character associations, many of the lesbian characters in 19th-century French literature were prostitutes or courtesans: personifications of vice who died early, violent deaths in moral endings. Samuel Taylor Coleridge's 1816 poem "Christabel" and the novella Carmilla (1872) by Sheridan Le Fanu both present lesbianism associated with vampirism.

Gradually, women began to write, and began to write about lesbian relationships. Until the 1920s, most major works involving lesbianism were penned by men. Foster suggests that women would have encountered suspicion about their own lives had they used same-sex love as a topic, and that some writers including Louise Labé, Charlotte Charke, and Margaret Fuller either changed the pronouns in their literary works to male, or made them ambiguous. Author George Sand was portrayed as a character in several works in the 19th century; writer Mario Praz credited the popularity of lesbianism as a theme to Sand's appearance in Paris society in the 1830s. (Note: The cross-dressing Sand was the subject of a few of Elizabeth Barrett Browning's sonnets. Charlotte Brontë's Villette in 1853 initiated a genre of boarding school stories with homoerotic themes.)

In the 20th century, Katherine Mansfield, Amy Lowell, Gertrude Stein, H.D., Vita Sackville-West, Virginia Woolf, and Gale Wilhelm wrote popular works that had same-sex relationships as themes. In 1928, The Well of Loneliness and three other novels with lesbian themes were published in England: Elizabeth Bowen's The Hotel, Woolf's Orlando, and Compton Mackenzie's satirical novel Extraordinary Women. Unlike The Well of Loneliness, none of these other novels were banned. (Note: A fifth novel in 1928, American author Djuna Barnes' Ladies Almanack, is a roman à clef of a lesbian literary and artistic salon in Paris and circulated at first within those circles; Susan Sniader Lanser calls it a "sister-text" to Hall's landmark work, as Barnes includes a character based on Radclyffe Hall and passages that may be a response to The Well of Loneliness)

As the paperback book came into fashion, lesbian themes were relegated to pulp fiction. Many of the pulp novels typically presented very unhappy women, or relationships that ended tragically. Marijane Meaker later wrote that she was told to make the relationship end badly in Spring Fire because the publishers were concerned about the books being confiscated by the U.S. Postal Service. Patricia Highsmith, writing as Claire Morgan, wrote The Price of Salt in 1951 and refused to follow this directive. In the 1970s, lesbian feminist magazines such as The Furies and Sinister Wisdom began publication. Well-known writers who wrote on lesbian topics or about lesbian-themed plots included Rita Mae Brown, Dorothy Allison, Audre Lorde, and Cherríe Moraga.

=== Film ===
Lesbianism arrived early in filmmaking. The same constructs as in literature were placed on women in film. Women could challenging their feminine roles. Actresses appeared as men in male roles as early as 1914 in A Florida Enchantment. In Morocco (1930) Marlene Dietrich kisses a woman on the lips, and Katharine Hepburn plays a man in Christopher Strong in 1933 and again in Sylvia Scarlett in 1936. Overt female homosexuality was introduced in the 1929 film Pandora's Box. German films depicting homosexuality were distributed throughout Europe, but 1931's Mädchen in Uniform was thought unsuitable for the U.S.

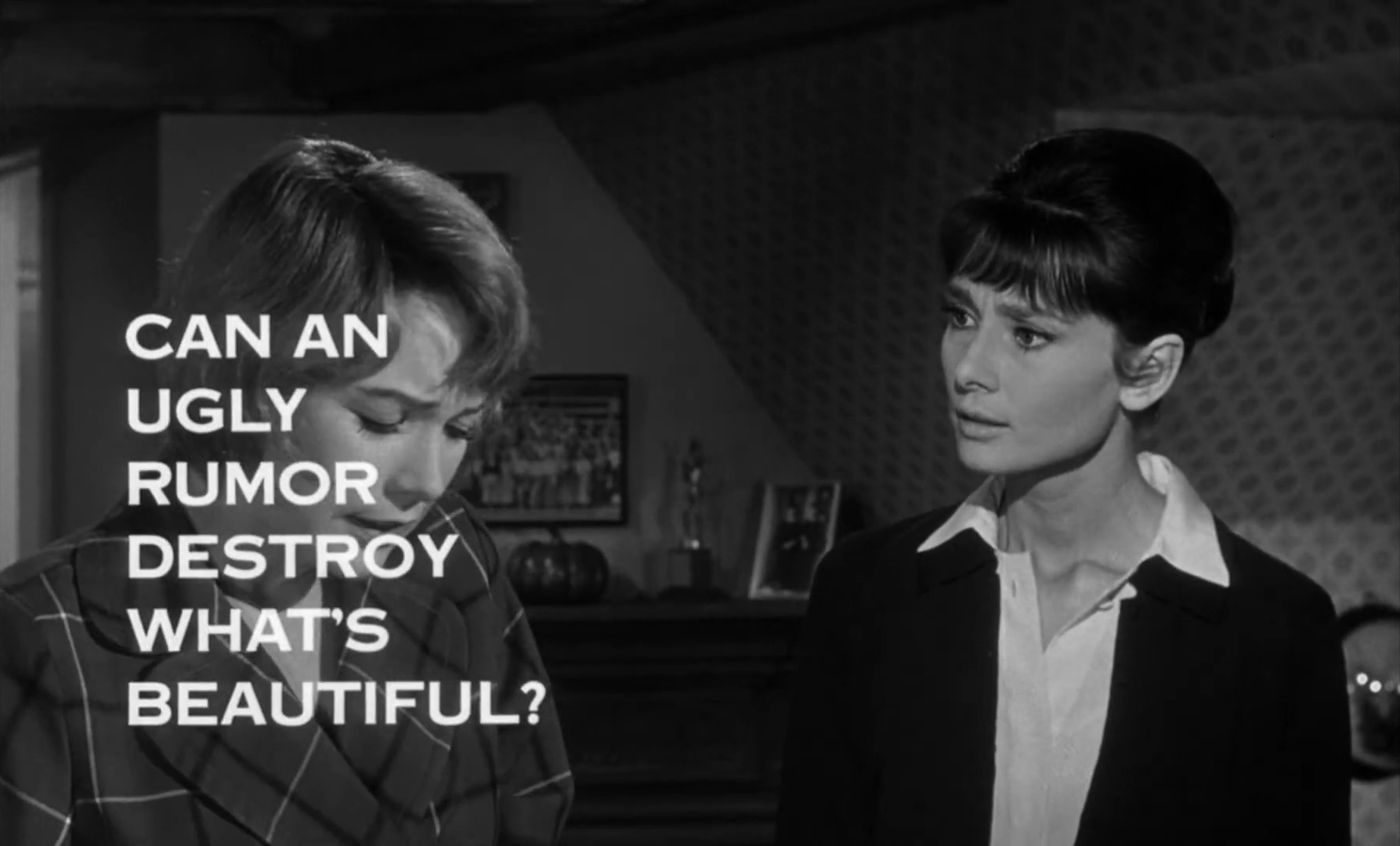
Lesbianism, or homosexuality, was never spoken about in The Children's Hour (1961), but it is transparent why Shirley MacLaine's character hangs herself

The 1930 Hays Code resulted in censoring of most references to homosexuality in American films. The originally-lesbian play The Children's Hour was converted into a heterosexual love triangle and retitled These Three. The 1933 biopic Queen Christina veiled speculation about Christina of Sweden's affairs with women. Censors removed a lesbian scene from the 1951 film The Pit of Loneliness. The code was relaxed somewhat after 1961, and the next year William Wyler remade The Children's Hour, though with a tragic ending that set a precedent for endings of films about homosexuality. If not victims, lesbians were depicted as villains or morally corrupt, such as brothel madames by Barbara Stanwyck in Walk on the Wild Side from 1962 and Shelley Winters in The Balcony in 1963. Lesbians as predators were presented in Rebecca (1940), women's prison films like Caged (1950), or From Russia with Love (1963). Lesbian vampire themes reappeared in Dracula's Daughter (1936), Blood and Roses (1960), Vampyros Lesbos (1971), and The Hunger (1983). Basic Instinct (1992) featured a bisexual murderer played by Sharon Stone; it set off protests about the depiction of gay people as predators.

The first film to address lesbianism with depth was The Killing of Sister George in 1968, filmed in London's lesbian Gateways club. Film historian Vito Russo considers the film to treat a multifaceted, openly lesbian character who other lesbians force into silence. Personal Best in 1982, and Lianna in 1983 treated lesbian relationships more sympathetically, though with unhappy relationships. Personal Best was criticized for its plot device of one woman returning to a relationship with a man, implying that lesbianism is a phase. More ambiguous portrayals were seen in Silkwood (1983), The Color Purple (1985), and Fried Green Tomatoes (1991).

An era of independent filmmaking brought different stories, writers, and directors to films. Desert Hearts (1985) was directed by lesbian Donna Deitch, loosely based on Jane Rule's novel Desert of the Heart. It received a mixed reception. The late 1980s and early 1990s ushered in New Queer Cinemam treating lesbian issues seriously. Films included Rose Troche's avant garde romantic comedy Go Fish (1994) and the first film about African American lesbians, Cheryl Dunye's The Watermelon Woman, in 1995. Later films included The Incredibly True Adventure of Two Girls in Love (1995), Antonia's Line (1995), When Night Is Falling (1995), Better Than Chocolate (1999), and the social satire But I'm a Cheerleader (1999).

=== Theatre ===
The first stage production to feature a lesbian kiss and open depiction of two women in love is the 1907 Yiddish play God of Vengeance (Got fun nekome) by Sholem Asch. Rivkele, a young woman, and Manke, a prostitute in her father's brothel, fall in love. On March 6, 1923, during a performance of the play in a New York City theatre, producers and cast were informed that they had been indicted by a Grand Jury for violating the Penal Code that defined the presentation of "an obscene, indecent, immoral and impure theatrical production." They were arrested the following day when they appeared before a judge. Two months later, they were found guilty in a jury trial. The producers were fined $200 and the cast received suspended sentences. The play is considered by some to be "the greatest drama of the Yiddish theater". God of Vengeance was the inspiration for the 2015 play Indecent by Paula Vogel, which features lesbian characters Rifkele and Manke. Indecent was nominated for multiple 2017 Tony Awards.

Broadway musical The Prom featured lesbian characters Emma Nolan and Alyssa Greene. In 2019, the production was nominated for six Tony Awards, including Best Musical, and received the Drama Desk Award for Outstanding Musical. A performance from The Prom was included in the 2018 Macy's Thanksgiving Day Parade and made history by showing the first same-sex kiss in the parade's broadcast. Jagged Little Pill featured lesbian character Jo, who is dealing with her religious mother's disapproval.

=== Television ===
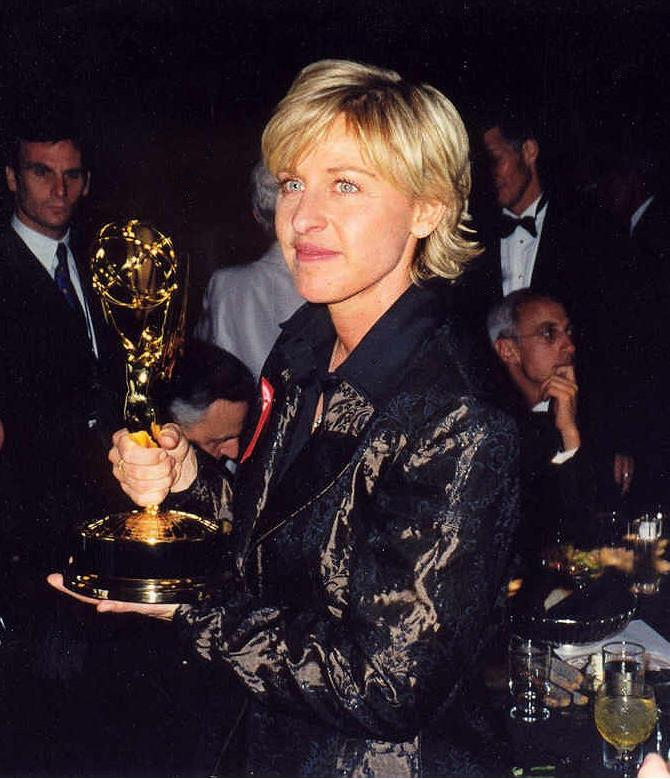
Ellen DeGeneres with her Emmy Award in 1997 (her coming out in the media, as well as her sitcom, "ranks, hands down, as the single most public exit in gay history", changing media portrayals of lesbians in Western culture)

Television began to address homosexuality much later than film. The first time a lesbian was portrayed on network television was the NBC drama The Eleventh Hour in the early 1960s, ending with the lesbian being "converted" to heterosexuality. Lesbian invisibility in TV continued into the 1970s. Police drama series could include a gay stock character to serve as a victims of blackmail or anti-gay violence, or as a criminal. Lesbians were included as villains, motivated to murder by their desires, internalized homophobia, or fear of being exposed as homosexual. One episode of Police Woman earned protests by the National Gay Task Force before it aired for portraying a trio of murderous lesbians who killed retirement home patients for their money. NBC edited the episode because of the protests. In the mid-1970s, lesbians began to appear as police officers or detectives. In 1991, a bisexual lawyer character on L.A. Law shared the first significant lesbian kiss (Note: 21 Jump Street included a kiss between series regular Holly Robinson Peete and guest star Katy Boyer in "A Change of Heart" (1990) but it did not inspire the critical or popular attention later such kisses would engender.) on primetime television, stirring controversy.

In the mid-1980s through the 1990s, sitcoms frequently employed a "coming out" episode, where a friend of one of the stars admits she is a lesbian, forcing the cast to deal with the issue, as in Designing Women, The Golden Girls, and Friends. Recurring openly lesbian characters were seen on Married... with Children, Mad About You, and Roseanne with a highly publicized episode. The sitcom with the most significant impact to the image of lesbians was Ellen, which generated enormous publicity from the 1997 coming out episode; Ellen DeGeneres appeared on the cover of Time magazine with the headline "Yep, I'm Gay". The episode won DeGeneres an Emmy, but conservative organizations opposed it, and the show was cancelled. A popular show for adolescents was Buffy the Vampire Slayer. In the fourth season, Tara and Willow admit their love for each other, without fanfare. In the 2000s came network television series devoted solely to gay characters. Showtime's American rendition of Queer as Folk ran from 2000 to 2005 with a lesbian couple as main characters. Aggressive advertising made the show the highest rated on the network.

== Chic and popular culture ==
The August 1993 cover of Vanity Fair that marked the arrival of lesbian chic as a social phenomenon in the 1990s

Lesbian visibility has improved since the early 1980s, partly due to public figures who have attracted public and press discussion of their sexuality. The primary figure earning this attention was Martina Navratilova, as she denied being lesbian, admitted to being bisexual, had very public relationships with Rita Mae Brown and Judy Nelson, and acquired as much press about her sexuality as she did her athletic achievements.

Other public figures acknowledged their homosexuality, such as musicians k.d. lang and Melissa Etheridge. Madonna pushed sexual boundaries in her performances. In 1993, heterosexual supermodel Cindy Crawford posed for a cover of Vanity Fair in a provocative arrangement that showed Crawford pretending to shave k.d. lang's face. The image "became an internationally recognized symbol of the phenomenon of lesbian chic".

The year 1994 marked a rise in lesbian visibility, particularly appealing to women with feminine appearances. Between 1992 and 1994, Mademoiselle, Vogue, Cosmopolitan, Glamour, Newsweek, and New York magazines featured stories about women who admitted sexual histories with other women. Lesbian visibility increased again in 2009 when sexually fluid female celebrities, such as Cynthia Nixon and Lindsay Lohan, commented openly about their relationships with women, and reality television addressed same-sex relationships. Psychiatrists and feminist philosophers wrote that the rise in women acknowledging same-sex relationships was due to growing social acceptance, but conceded that "only a certain kind of lesbian—slim and elegant or butch in just the right androgynous way—is acceptable to mainstream culture."

== Legal rights ==
=== Criminalization of sexual activity ===
Thirty-eight countries penalize sex between women, or have unclear laws that may be applied to lesbian sex. Penalties explicitly listed for lesbian sexual activity include lashings (as in Iran and Brunei) or prison sentences (as in Oman, Gambia, and Malawi), or lashes and fines (as in Mauritania).

=== Custody and parenting ===
Family issues were significant concerns for lesbians when gay activism became more vocal in the 1960s and 1970s. Custody issues in particular were of interest since often courts would not award custody to mothers who were openly homosexual, even though the general procedure acknowledged children were awarded to the biological mother.

Several studies performed as a result of custody disputes compared outcomes for children of single lesbian mothers and single nonlesbian mothers. They found that children's mental health, happiness, overall adjustment, sexual orientation, and sex roles, were similar between both groups.

The ability to adopt children domestically or internationally, or provide a home as a foster parent, is a political and family priority for many lesbians, as is improving access to artificial insemination.

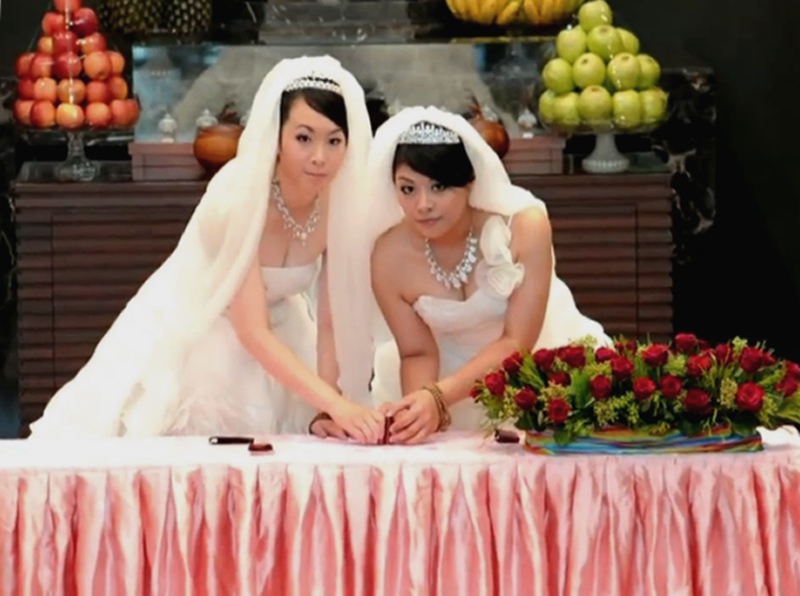
Two women at their Buddhist wedding ceremony, Taiwan, 2012 (same-sex marriage was legalized in 2019)

=== Marriage ===
In a 2023 international survey covering thirty countries, 56% of respondents wanted same-sex marriage to be legal. In 19 of the 20 countries in the survey that have same-sex marriage, support for the practice is above 50%; in 9 of the other 10 countries, over half of respondents favor some legal recognition for same-sex couples. As of 2025, same-sex marriage is legal in thirty-nine countries.

== See also ==
- Lesbian bar – Drinking establishment catering to lesbians
- Lesbian erasure – Act of minimizing lesbian representation
- Lesbian erotica – Visual art depiction of female-female sexuality
- Lesbian fashion – Clothes or accessories mainly worn by lesbian women
- Lipstick lesbian – Slang for a stereotypically feminine lesbian
- Lesbian Visibility Week – Annual observance
- Dyke – Lesbian slang term
- Dyke march – Lesbian-led gathering and protest march
- Yuri – Fiction genre
- Domestic violence in lesbian relationships
- List of lesbian periodicals
- African-American LGBTQ community
- Female bonding – Close personal relationship between women
- Homosexual behavior in animals
- Homosociality – Socializing with the same sex
- LGBTQ themes in speculative fiction
- Queerplatonic relationship – Non-romantic intimate partnerships
