= Lesbian fashion =

Clothes or accessories mainly worn by lesbian women

Lesbian fashion is the style of dress popular among lesbian and women-loving-women communities. It utilizes various signals and archetypes to convey the wearer's sexual orientation. The trends of lesbian fashion are influenced by societal factors, and its statements have been made purposefully subtle or bold in accordance to the shifting societal climate around lesbianism. Society has impacted the trends seen in fashion, both negative and positive, for every community. Each community reacts differently and takes certain attributes from each trend throughout history. The lesbian and queer community has accepted and rejected several trends to create their own subcategory of fashion. Throughout history, it is visible how the lesbian community adopted their own sense of style. From the beginning of the 1900s women started exploring their own sense of style by incorporating men's clothing, transitioning to the Jazz Age where the Butch and Femme styles became popular, to the 1960s where it was common to see women in jeans and t-shirts strolling the town with no bra and no make-up, to the many aesthetics that we see currently in today's society.

== History ==
=== Pre-1900s ===
Fashion has long been used as a signifier of sexuality and gender expression. However, due to the taboo nature of homosexuality for much of history, the term "lesbian" is rarely used while referring to instances of women breaking normalities of the era's fashion.

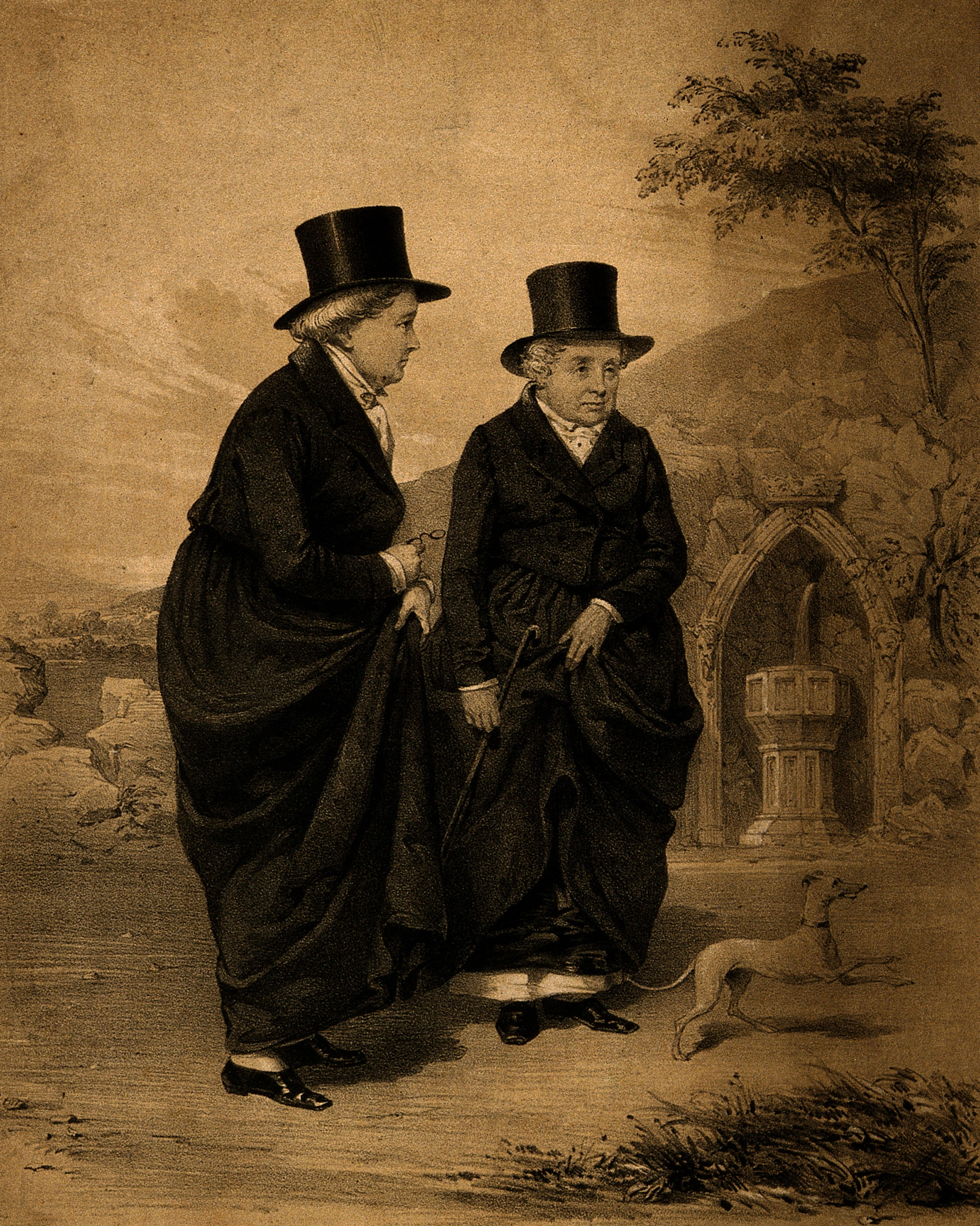
Portrait of The Rt. Hon. Lady Eleanor Butler & Miss Ponsonby, known as the Ladies of Llangollen

Cross-dressing has historically been the most widespread and easily recognizable method of dress for women seeking to break fashion standards. Cross-dressing has been used for many reasons, and historical resources show women donning men's clothing to pursue financial liberation, enlist as soldiers in war, explore sexual or gender identity, or as humorous displays of immorality. In the 18th century, cross-dressing became something of a spectacle, and these women were often associated with their relationship with or attraction to other women.

Early figures of lesbian fashion were Eleanor Butler and Sarah Ponsonby, otherwise known as the Ladies of Llangollen, two upper-class Irish women who lived together in the late 18th century. Their possible relationship was both highly scrutinized and much admired by their contemporaries, even drawing attention from figures such as Anna Seward, Percy Shelley, Lord Byron, and William Wordsworth. After eloping to Wales in 1778 and establishing a home together, they were known to dress in black riding habits, men's top hats and trousers, enormous shoes, and "long out of fashion" powdered wigs.

Mademoiselle Raucourt was an 18th-century actress, known primarily for her notoriety as a Parisian lesbian and cross-dresser. In 1789, she was reported to leave the home of her female lover disguised as a man. When she died in 1815, the clergy of her parish initially refused to bury her body, and a riot broke out in the church to protest the decision.

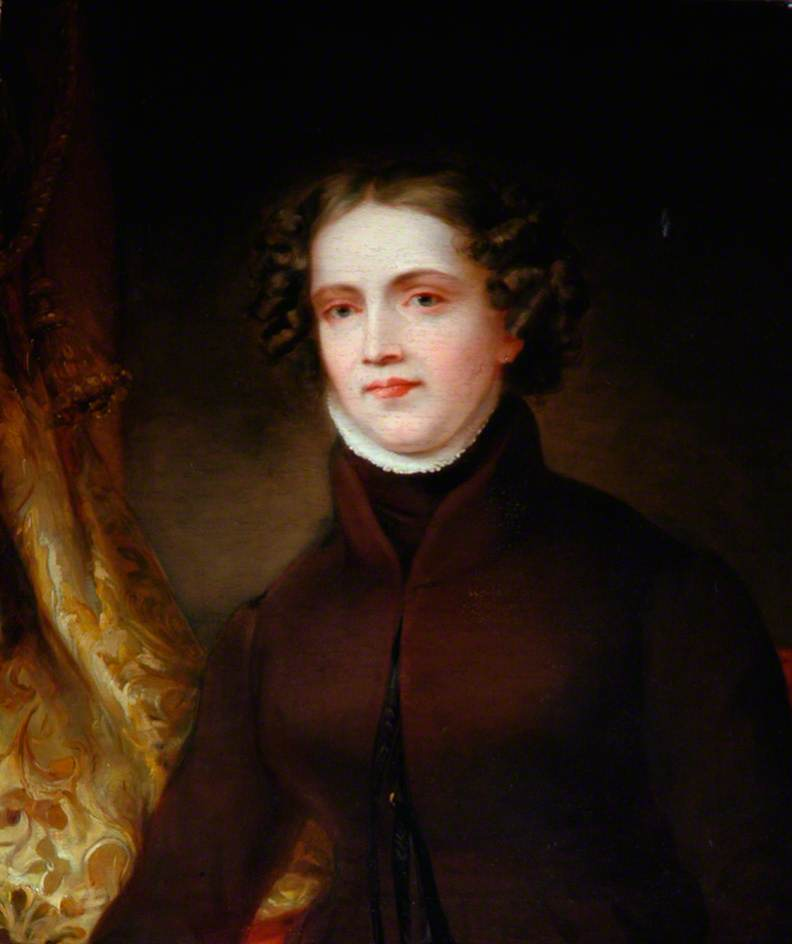
Portrait of Anne Lister

Anne Lister was a 19th-century English landowner and diarist, widely regarded as the first modern "butch" lesbian. Her highly detailed and explicit diaries are one of the best resources for lesbian fashion in this time. She was known to incorporate traditionally masculine silhouettes and articles of clothing into her everyday dress. In modern times, she is most associated with her usage of top hats and the color black; however, top hats were never expressly mentioned in her diaries or clothing inventories.

=== 1900s to 1910s ===
In late Meiji era Japan, lovers Hiratsuka Raichō and Otake Kokichi openly wore mens clothing. During their year-long affair both wrote about wearing traditional men's kimonos and men's clogs. Kokichi is often described as wearing blue, a color traditionally used in men's clothing. Japanese men of the time usually wore European style clothing, while women wore traditional clothing. The two were subverting both male and female clothing norms of the time.

Though early lesbian fashion is not defined, it is assumed through interlinking common male and female fashion. In 1918, Vita Sackville-West, a woman newly discovering her sexuality, experimented with "the duality of her nature (in which the feminine and the masculine elements alternately preponderate)." Sackwille-West found herself indulging in commonly known men's closing like "Breeches and gaiters".

=== 1920s to 1930s (Interwar Period) ===
In the 1920s, wealthy Parisian Lesbians frequented local cafes and often wore their hair short, and accessorized with monocles and pinned violets to their jackets. The trends of violets and monocles spread to Great Britain. The play The Captive by Edouard Bourdet featured a woman who was sent violets by her female lover. This play may have helped spread the trend of violets to the United States.

Some women still preferred to wear men's clothing to express themselves. Una Troubridge was known for wearing high-collared shirts and top hats. Gertrude Stein was known to prioritize comfort and practicality in her clothing, and often appeared masculine, a trait often associated with modern butch lesbians. Many musicians during this time, called the "Jazz Age", were involved in the queer community. In her song "Prove It on Me Blues" Ma Rainey sung about wearing men's clothing and had an accompanying portrait made depicting herself in a suit and fedora. Gladys Bentley was another woman who made an impact on the queer movement and lesbian fashion during the Jazz Age. Her sense of style was one of the first outwardly seen crossdressing tendencies. In a 1933 review of her performance, journalist W.E. Thomas described Bentley as "A fat Black woman dressed in shirtwaist and skirt with her hair plastered back on her head".

Sailor outfits and other nautical-inspired clothing had become a small trend after the First World War, with Chanel releasing a collection of sailor inspired outfits, but sailor outfits became most popular with gay and lesbian people. Sailing had been associated with queer culture for years, so many lesbians wore these outfits to openly express their sexual orientation in a playful and dramatic way. These outfits with striped vests, wide-leg pants, and bright berets, were often worn to parties and other events. French performer Suzy Solidor popularized the style in the Paris nightlife. She often performed in Cabarets wearing sailor outfits and singing sea shanties. In the United States, Mabel Hampton and other New York lesbians often wore sailor outfits as well.

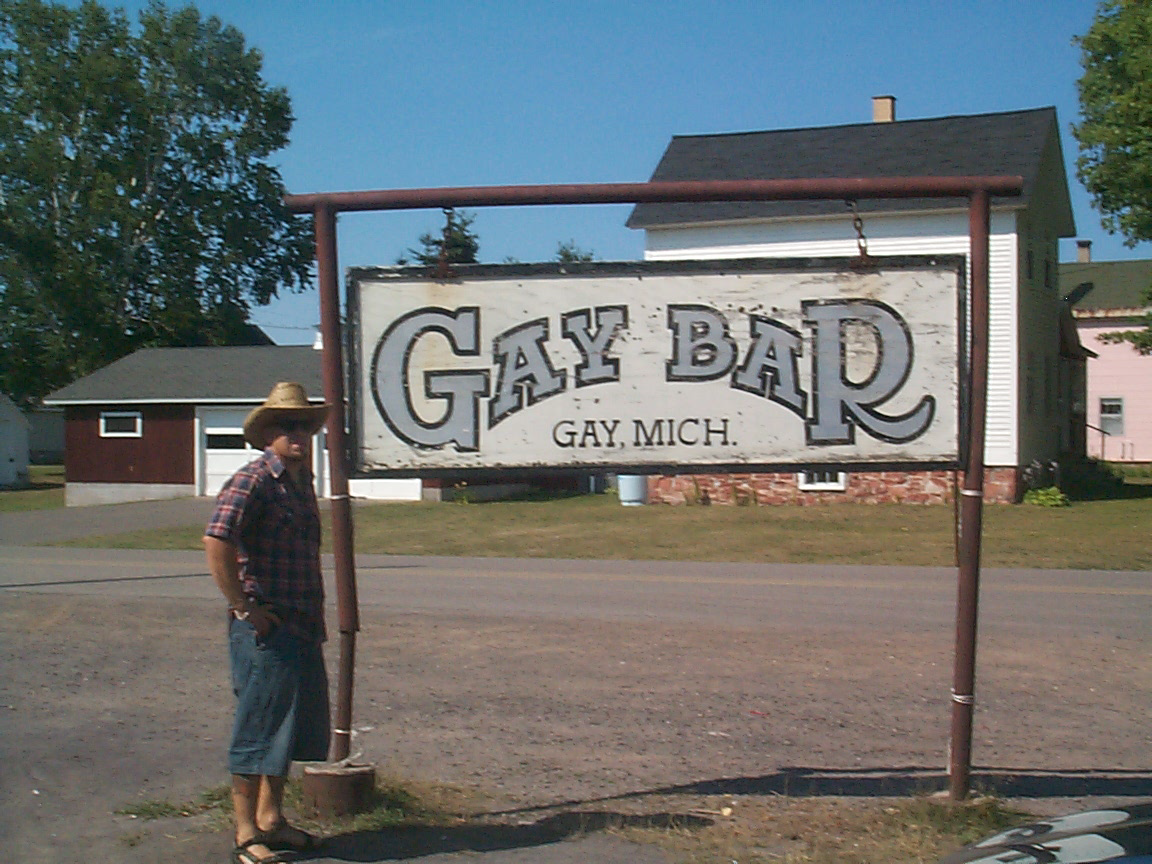
Example of a gay bar

=== 1940s to 1950s ===
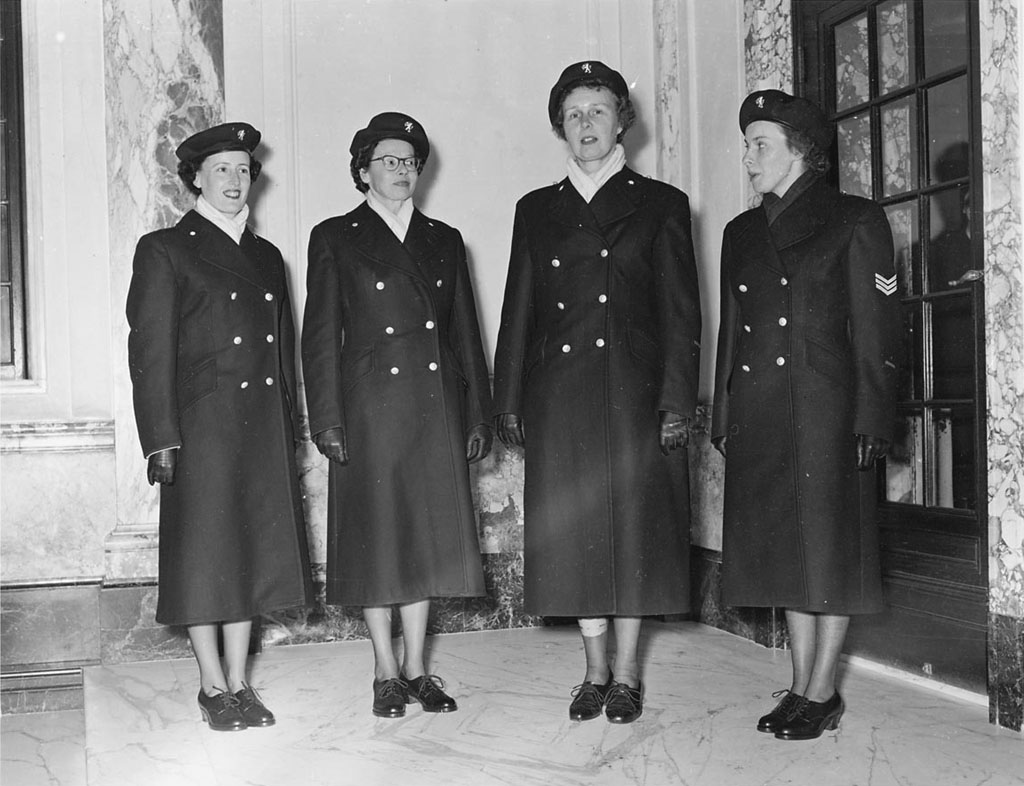
Presentation of the New Uniforms of the Amsterdam Female Police Officers, January 6, 1954

Similar to World War I, World War II brought numerous opportunities for women. More women joined the working class society and began making public spaces for themselves. Spaces like bars, bookstores, coffee shops, and softball fields. In these spaces, women were able to express individuality through their clothing. Lesbians who participated in the Gay Bar Scene in Buffalo, New York gained the name of "Tough Bar Lesbians". These women often wore men's work clothes. They also frequently went to local bars and often caused bar fights. These women worked in the factories during the Second World War, and did not want to conform to the emerging strict gender roles of the 1950s. Many of these women continued to work in factories and adopted more "butch" personas. The butch and femme personas that were introduced in the 1940s from the working-class lesbian culture have had a large influence on lesbian fashion throughout the decades. Lesbian partners during the 1950s would reflect either the femme persona or the butch; a butch would present themselves in a man's suit, with the common D.A. haircut courting a femme wearing a dress with makeup and high heels. This time period began the major shift in lesbian culture due to the uprising trend of women shopping for men's clothing and the arrival of the butch appearance.

=== 1960s and 1970s ===
Lesbian feminist groups used fashion to promote their political ideas through the creation of the "Dyke Uniform". The Dyke Uniform consisted of work boots, button-down work shirts, tank tops, jeans, bare face, no bra, and sometimes short hair. By purposefully pulling from what society deemed as unattractive this look utilized anti-fashion to create a statement against sexist gender roles and the male gaze. In this way, lesbian feminist groups at the time utilized "ugliness" as a tool to free themselves from stifling misogynistic expectations during the second wave of feminism.

However, starting in the 60s with the second wave and ending in the 90s there was a lot of infighting between lesbian subcultures in which lesbian fashion determined sides. The lesbian feminist groups often clashed with sadomasochism lesbian groups characterized by their love of leather clothing, a trend following the "Feminist sex wars". One lesbian interviewed by Jane Traie recounted, "I remember in those days you could not wear a leather jacket in the GLC-funded Gay and Lesbian Centre", in this way lesbian fashion became a political statement.

During the late 1960s and early 1970s, the popularized butch-femme appearances were criticized by the lesbian feminist community due to the similarities to traditional masculine and feminine gender roles. The rise in the lesbian feminist movement brought its own fashion trends into the mix. Many women involved in the lesbian feminist movement adopted their own "dress code" to prevail against societal norms. These women often refused to wear make-up, shave their legs or have long hair. They wore outfits including Levi's or overalls with T-shirts and hiking boots.

The 1970s brought a new style with the upbringing of the feminist movement. JoAnn Loulan describes her experience with lesbian fashion during the 70s. "I ended up getting a lover who took me out and showed me what to get, she took me to the thrift stores for flannel shirts and blue jeans, and you had to wear Birkenstocks or tennis shoes or Fry boots".

=== 1980s ===
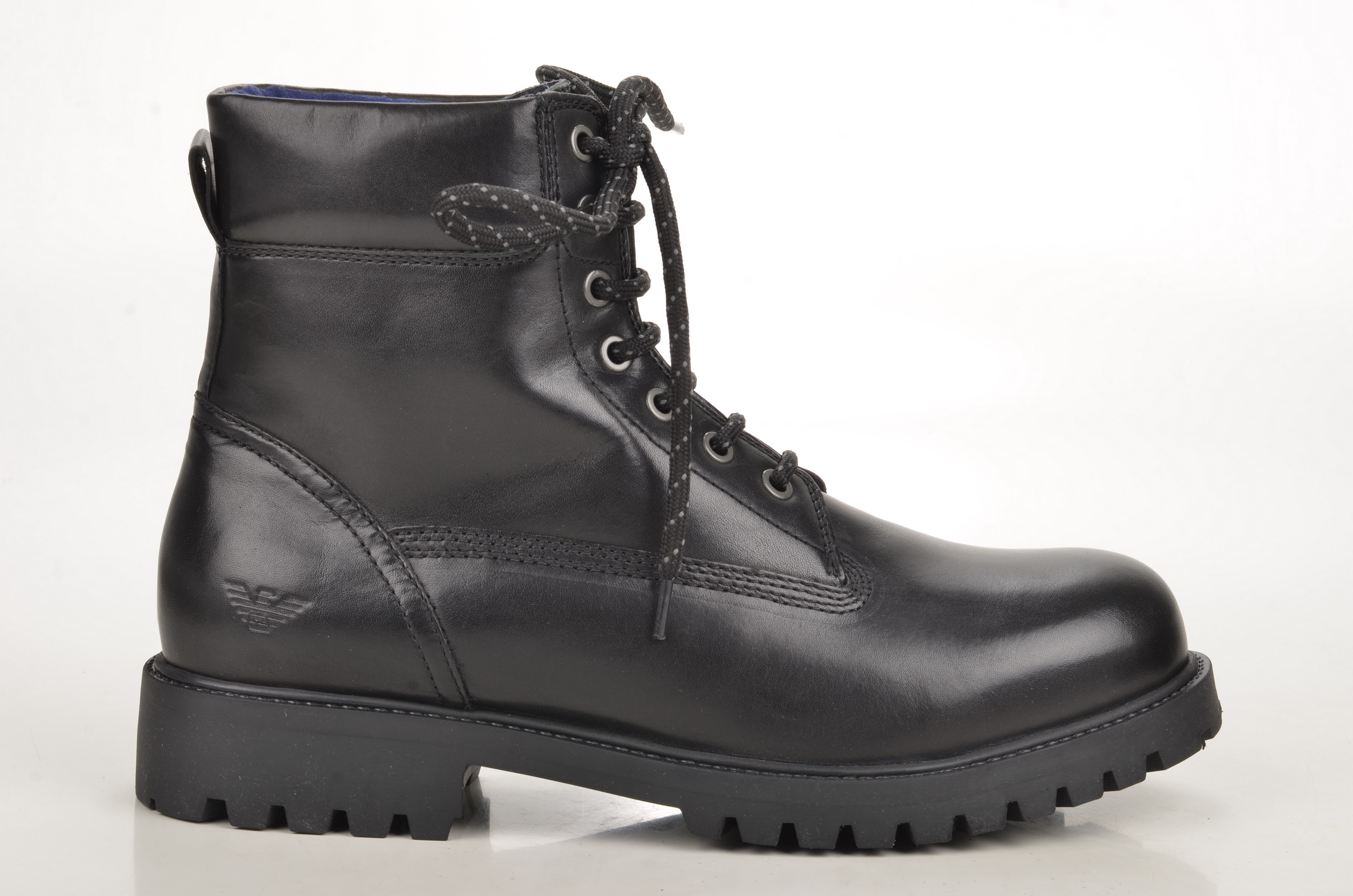
Stiefelette Kalbsleder Schwarz www.spera.de

In London during the 80s, punk and rebel culture was very much alive in the lesbian scene. Punk/rebel lesbians similar to SM lesbian groups, were characterized by their love of leather biker jackets, however, not all punk lesbians were into sadomasochism. Punk lesbians relied on anti-fashion statements like ripped clothing, badges and pins, painted clothing, and incorporating lesbian symbolism in their outfits. The group also pulled from military inspiration like army boots. Homemade accessories and crafts were a large part of rebel lesbian fashion.

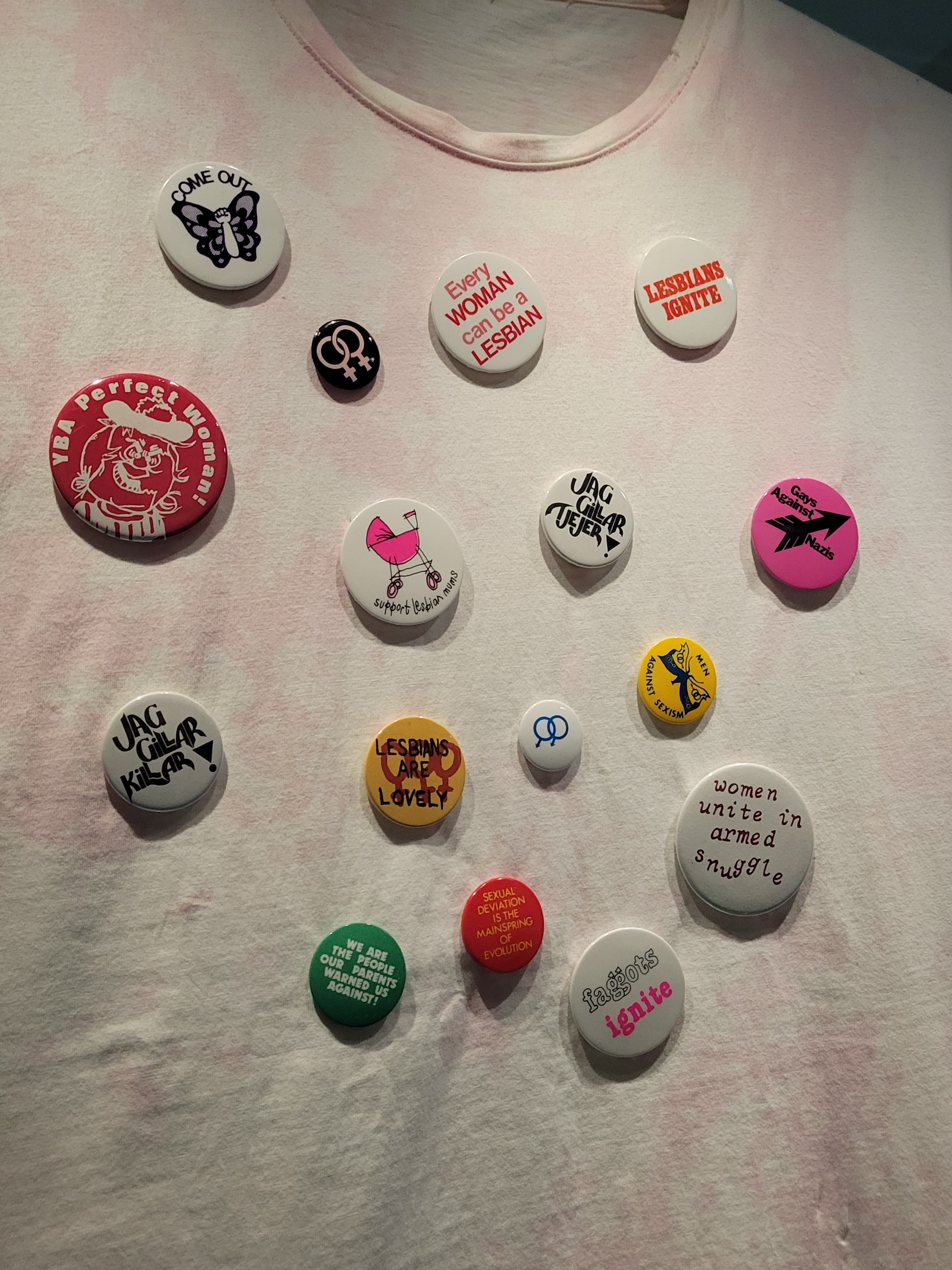
An example of how punks used pins to signal to other lesbians

Crafts are historically undervalued because of their stereotype of being women's work and the sexist devaluation that followed this idea. Punk lesbians fought to reclaim crafts by incorporating it into their outfits through pins, badges, and painted emblems adorning their jackets. In this way, punk/rebel lesbian fashion was used to find independence from forms of capitalist hierarchy and rebel against the oppression that deemed homemade crafts less valuable.

Rebel dykes fought for gay and lesbian rights in London, often facing physical violence for their political beliefs and recognizably queer fashion. Because of discrimination punk fashion and through it, political beliefs were spread in lesbian/gay bars that became safe places and platforms for punk lesbian culture. In this way punk and queer culture as a whole are intertwined, the word "punk" even being drawn for Polari gay slang according to Lucy Robinson, Professor of Punk at Sussex University in England. Rebel lesbian culture was so niche at the time because of the alienation they endured from other lesbian subcultures for their sex-positive views. Mainstream lesbians "were very separatist and quite anti-men, and we just wanted to have lots of fun, do drugs, and have lots of sex, and make music, which they seemed to disapprove of. So we created our own scene" according to Siobhan Fahey, director of the documentary Rebel Dykes who was part of the peak of rebel lesbian culture in England.

=== 1990s and 2000s ===
The 1990s were a more difficult time of self-expression for the lesbian community. The economic state of the country brought certain standards that women had to reach to be respected. Unlike the 70s and 80s, where women were open to expressing their sexuality in fashion by walking the streets with no bra, wearing leather jackets and blue jeans, the 90s brought a more business-focused style to light.

There is another side to the 90s lesbian fashion. Leather brought a certain sex appeal to the lesbian community during this time. An uprising in leather jackets, pants, biker boots, and cowboy boots.

=== Post-2010s ===
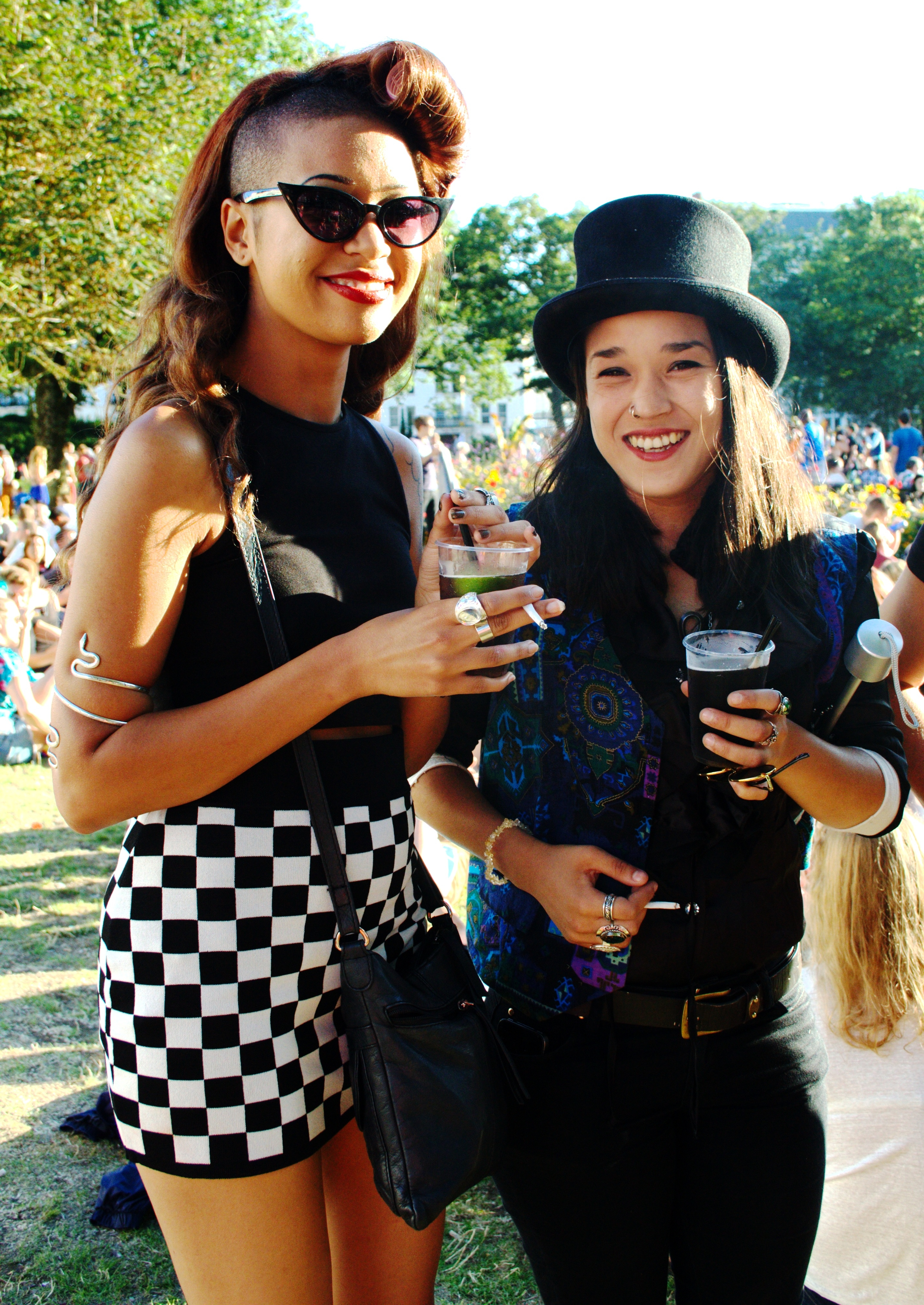
After-party held on St. James's Street, Kempton, Brighton. An annual event concurrent with Pride in Brighton & Hove.

In today's ever-changing society, lesbian fashion is harder to pinpoint due to self-expression and individualism. In the Post-2010s era, fashion is broken down into different aesthetics. Some lesbian fashion aesthetics include: Cottagecore, Vegan/Sustainable, Hippie, Witchy/Goth, Dark Academia, and the classic Butch, Femme. Also included in these fashion trends are Futch/Stem, a style created that is a mix between the butch and femme styles. Common Stem or Futch fashion trends include taking butch trends by wearing men's clothes with feminine aspects like long hair and make-up.

In today's society, there are staples or "must-haves" in fashion that are more attached to certain aesthetics. In the post 2010s butch aesthetic, pieces like jerseys, boxers, suits, sports bras, and 5 -inch inseam shorts are more popular in the butch fashion. In the femme aspect, more staples include dresses with converse, crazy patterns, bucket hats, and crocheted items like cardigans and tote bags are more common in today's femme society.
