= Vida de Voss =

Namibian feminist activist

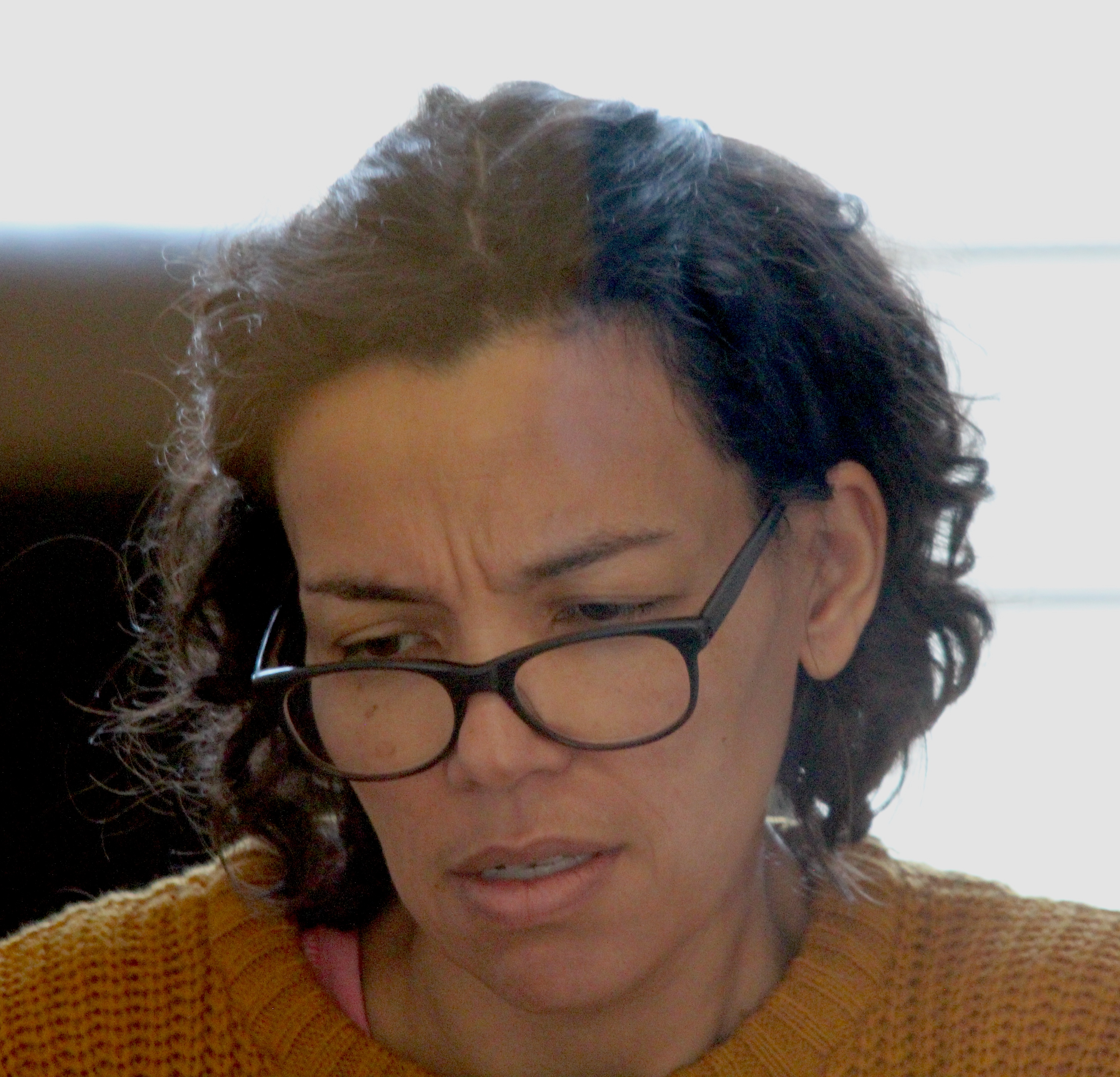
- Occupations: Feminist activist and Teacher
- Known for: Sister Namibia

Vida V. de Voss is a Namibian feminist activist, the director of the Namibian feminist organisation Sister Namibia, and a former lecturer in English literature at the Namibia University of Science and Technology. She now teaches English at Private School Swakopmund.

== Education ==
De Voss earned a master's degree in philosophy from Stellenbosch University in 2006, and her master's thesis was entitled, Emmanuel Levinas on ethics as the first truth. In 2010, she earned a master's degree in English literature from Iowa State University, and her thesis was entitled The Identity Challenge in Toni Morrison's "Paradise" .

== Career ==
De Voss was a lecturer in English literature at the Namibia University of Science and Technology from 2013 until 2021.

She presently works at Private School Swakopmund where she teaches English to Grade 9 & 10 Students.

De Voss is the director of Sister Namibia, a feminist organisation and publisher of an eponymous magazine (first published in 1989), based in Windhoek. De Voss has also been a guest speaker at the University of Namibia in Windhoek. In March 2016, she spoke to an audience of hundreds of women at a conference at Windhoek's Safari Court Hotel to commemorate International Women's Day.
