= Social mobility in South Africa =

Social mobility in South Africa refers to the movement of South Africans from one social class to another. it is the study of upward socio-economic change in status achievable by South Africans from generation to generation.

As South Africa saw the end of political apartheid, the country experienced movement in the demographics of social class. Many native South Africans were able to get high paying jobs and raise themselves out of poverty. However, South Africa still remains one of the most unequal societies on the planet today. Though racial lines of the rich whites and poor blacks became less clear after the shift to democratization, inequality still exists on a major scale, and has shifted to the differences within the black community. Since South Africa became a democracy, those blacks that were more privileged or grew up in a better living environment have experienced higher incomes and social stability. The majority of such blacks are those who were lucky enough to live close enough to go to school in a white area when apartheid ended, and therefore received an education far superior to the status quo for the rest of the nation. However, the blacks who did not have such privilege remained poor, and little opportunity for social mobility exists.

———>

A good indicator of social mobility is opportunity and equality of education, as statistics show that there is a direct correlation between education level and income. The Government of South Africa has made massive investments in education. However, when examined more closely, it was found that these investments in education benefit the wealthiest of South Africans the most, and do very little to help the poor communities. Tests conducted in South African schools showed that 27% of 6th grade students in South Africa are illiterate. However, when schools are separated by regional wealth that number drops to just 4%, revealing a stark contrast between education for the rich and poor. Because of this large inequality of opportunity, it is difficult for a poor South Africans to raise themselves out of poverty. Though the opportunity exists, the chances are much lower for a poor South African to receive opportunity than a rich South African, revealing a trend of little social mobility. Some scholars argue that this lack of social mobility for the nations poor is further fostered by government funded housing. Since its transition to democracy, the South African government has made large investments in government funded housing. These government run housing projects are located in areas that receive the least amount of funding for education and welfare, ensuring that the uneducated and poor will remain uneducated and poor. A level of social mobility does exist among blacks who are able to attend schools in white areas, but with 76% of the total population being black combined with massive regional grouping of blacks, white schools are few and far between, and inaccessible to the poor.

Perspectives on South African social mobility can vary. The topic of race has dominated South African politics for the last half century, and therefore, when looking at inequality and social mobility, people often turn to race as the determining variable. It is possible to argue that social mobility exists in South Africa, and it can be seen in the fact that all the wealth and high status within the country was previously held by whites, whereas today, there are many natives who have been able to pull themselves out of oppression and into a status of income security and wealth. However, it is also clear that there is a large gap between those natives who have been able to achieve a level of success and those who have remained in poverty. It is in this gap where social mobility is hardly present, if at all. Statistically, those natives who were born to poor families and poor communities do not have the equality of opportunity to achieve success in South African society.
