= Elizabeth Khaxas =

Namibian feminist

- Born: 1960 (age 65–66)
- Occupations: Writer; Women’s rights activist

Elizabeth Khaxas (born 1960) is a Namibian writer and activist.

Khaxas ran Sister Namibia from 1998 to 2004. After leaving Sister Namibia, she founded the Women's Leadership Centre.

Khaxas and her partner were also part of the Frank and Khaxas v Chairperson of the Immigration Selection Board court case in Namibia, which tried to obtain legal recognition of same-sex relationships in Namibia.
