= Sister Namibia =

Namibian non-governmental organization

- Formation: 1989
- Founder: Elizabeth Khaxis and Liz Frank
- Type: Non-governmental organization
- Headquarters: Windhoek, Namibia
- Region served: Namibia
- Director: Vida de Voss
- Website: https://sisternamibia.org/

Sister Namibia, formerly known as the Sister Namibia Collective, is a feminist nonpartisan non-governmental organization (NGO) located in Windhoek, Namibia. The organization was established in 1989 on the eve of Namibia's independence from South Africa. Sister Namibia advocates for women's rights and engages in activities that promote full gender equality in a world free from violence, discrimination, and oppression. From its inception, the organization's main function has been to produce Sister Namibia Magazine. In the 1990s Sister Namibia expanded its operations to include educational programs, research, activism, media engagement, and cultural activities in support of women's rights.

== History ==
=== Origins ===
The formation of the Sister Namibia Collective follows the story of Namibia's liberation. Following World War I, the League of Nations mandated that Namibia, known then as South West Africa, be governed by South Africa. Not only was apartheid imposed under South African rule, but women's rights were restricted as well. Considered legal minors, married women could only engage in legal transactions with their husband's permission. Namibian women played key political and military leadership roles in the long fight for independence and these leaders ensured that women's rights became part of the liberation platform.

When Namibia won independence in 1990, the new constitution guaranteed “the equal and inalienable rights of all members of the human family . . . regardless of race, colour, ethnic origin, sex, religion, creed or social or economic status.” Human rights protections under the law, however, were not always visible in practice. The Sister Namibia Collective was formed by Elizabeth Khaxis and Liz Frank out of their realization that many women in Namibia did not even know that they had human rights. The Sister Namibia Collective's aim was to provide education and information about women's legal rights and to provide resources and skills so that women could claim their rights. The Collective functioned informally in the early years without a building or paid staff. Its main function at that time was to publish Sister Namibia Magazine “to speak out against all forms of oppression and discrimination against women, and to write women back into Namibian history.” The magazine was created with scanty resources by volunteers who met at member's houses.

The current director is Vida de Voss.

=== LGBTIQ Advocacy ===
In 1993 the Sister Namibia Collective broadened its advocacy aims to become the first Namibian organization to actively defend the rights of lesbian and gay people. Sister Namibia Magazine began to include stories about the lives and struggles of lesbians and bisexual women while the Collective became an outspoken challenger of homophobia in the news. Homosexuality had not been an issue of public debate in the early years of Namibia's independence, but after Zimbabwe President Robert Mugabe’s denouncement of homosexuals as “lower than pigs and dogs” and “un-African” in 1995 became widely publicized, Namibian officials followed suit. In October 1995 Hadino Hishongwa, Namibia's Deputy Minister for Lands, Resettlement, and Rehabilitation, told a reporter that homosexuality was akin to “cancer or AIDS” and recommended that homosexuals be “operated on to remove unnatural hormones.” Sister Namibia issued a response backed by Namibia's constitution: “We believe that gays and lesbians should have the same rights as heterosexuals in all spheres of life.” In December 1996 at the third South West Africa People's Organization (SWAPO) Women's Congress in Gobabis, Namibian President Sam Nujoma went off script from his prepared speech and warned that homosexual elements were exploiting Namibia's democracy and declared that “all necessary steps must be taken to combat influences that are influencing us and our children in a negative way. Homosexuals must be condemned and rejected in our society.” Sister Namibia demanded that Nujoma apologize and called for Namibians to “stand up together now and speak out against this or any other kind of hate speech and oppression against any member of our communities.” For its resolve in standing up to government officials in defense of sexual minority rights, and for its inclusion of lesbian and bisexual voices in Sister Namibia Magazine, the International Gay and Lesbian Human Rights Commission (IGLHRC) awarded Sister Namibia with the 1997 Felipa de Souza Award. In early 1997, in reaction to the homophobic remarks made by President Sam Nujoma, Sister Namibia provided meeting space and helped found The Rainbow Project, an advocacy and support network for lesbians and gay men in Namibia.

== Education and media ==
=== Sister Namibia Magazine ===
Sister Namibia Magazine has been published multiple times a year since 1989 in three languages: English, Afrikaans, and Oshiwambo. The magazine is used to "raise awareness among women, men and young people of the ways in which political, social, cultural, legal and economic systems of power control girls and women." It includes profiles of influential women along with op-ed articles, reviews from books included in their resource center, and informational articles detailing topics such as violence against women, women in Namibian government, and women's health issues. The magazine is distributed quarterly throughout Namibia. A subscription form is available on their website for international orders. An archive of editions dating back to the first one, published July 1989, is available on their website as well. Sister Namibia's aim with the magazine is to bring focus to issues Namibian women face. They also want women to be able to express themselves through written and art pieces, be aware of issues like xenophobia and economic exploitation, and to challenge oppression through education.

=== Resource Center ===
Sister Namibia's main office houses a library with over 2,000 books on a vast array of topics, including women's rights, sexuality, gender, and violence. The main goals of the resource center are to keep it maintained with books and documents on gender and women's issues, including the women's movement of Namibia. These resources are collected from local and international women's groups and research institutions. They also aim to be able to efficiently distribute the resources collected to other women's groups and NGOs.

=== Social media ===
Sister Namibia has been running a blog, hosted on their website, since February 2013. On this blog, they post about current events, feminist issues, and activism opportunities. They also include op-ed pieces from interns, staff, and friends on the organization. Sister Namibia also runs another blog specifically for contributions from their readers. Found here are poems and think pieces submitted by individuals familiar with Sister Namibia.There is a third blog, entitled Sister Namibia as well, which is hosted on Blogspot. Sister Namibia states that they use the internet to “make stories, get in contact with other women”.

Sister Namibia also runs a YouTube page, on which they have videos detailing feminist issues such as rape in marriage and sexual harassment. They conduct social experiments with interviews of the witnesses included in the videos.

On their Facebook page, Sister Namibia shares posts from their website and from others around Africa. They also post pictures from their community outreach and activism meetings and programs. In addition, they share relevant YouTube videos.

While Sister Namibia recognize the importance of the internet and social media, a lack of resources and knowledge presents constructional challenges for optimal networking.

=== Forums and Workshops ===
Sister Namibia works in coalition with many different NGO groups and organizations to bring awareness, education, and activism on a variety of issues. Past projects have included working with Ombetja Yehinga Organisation Trust (OYO) to hold dance events to educate the public about important issues including the alarming statistics of "baby dumping", where newborn babies are abandoned on the street, HIV/AIDS, gender based violence, and teenage pregnancy. Sister Namibia has also collaborated with Women and Child Protection Unit (WCPU) in Katutura, Windhoek, an organization that houses women and children who have been victims of domestic violence and abuse. Sister Namibia sponsored a drive aired on One Africa Television in order to collect donations of baby clothes, shoes, and household items for mothers who are in need. Sister Namibia founder Elizabeth |Khaxas has been very active in the public sphere. On the celebration of the first Girl Child Day in 2000, Khaxas gave a speech stating: "The time has come for young women to speak for themselves, in their own voices,” and sponsored a petition in support of domestic violence and child support legislation.

In 2003 Sister Namibia played a key role in the revival of Katutura Community Radio (now BASE FM 106.2). For more than five years the organization hosted the weekly radio show Women's Voices "to provide greater access to the media to women and girls of all walks of life, including from marginalised communities."

== Initiatives ==
=== 16 Days of Activism ===
The 16 Days of Activism against Gender Violence is an international campaign that began in 1991. For sixteen days between November 25 and December 10 activists hold events and promote the principle that women's rights are human rights. In Namibia, Sister Namibia has worked with the National Ministry for Gender Equality and Child Welfare to host events with Sandy Rudd, the Bank Windhoek Theatre School, Free Your Mind Entertainment and Spoken Word. Sister Namibia values the importance of art as an outlet to raise awareness about the prevalence of gender violence. The slogan used by Sister Namibia is “Arts United."

=== Orange Day Campaign ===
Sister Namibia is a partner in the United Nations’ campaign: UNite Campaign Orange Day Action Plan. The campaign was established to raise awareness and fight gender based violence inflicted on women and girls. The color orange is essential to the campaign, reflecting the optimism and hopeful attitude for a world without violence for women and girls; participants in Sister Namibia wear orange on the 25th day of each month as well as on International Day, November 25 of each calendar year. Sister Namibia acts in solidarity with the U.N., along with other governments, NGOs, and private corporations to engage with celebrities, athletes, and others with powerful voices in communities across the globe. Sister Namibia promotes the goals of the Orange Day Campaign by connecting women with legal resources to fight violence.

=== SisterPADS Program ===
The SisterPADS program run by Sister Namibia is committed to bringing agency and mobility to menstruating school girls and women by providing re-usable pads. The project was created in part to overcome the problem in Namibia where girls miss an average of three school days every month due to lack of menstrual pads. Sister Namibia believes that no girl should have to stay home because she can’t afford pads. SisterPADS are made of cotton and waterproof polyurethane laminate material and are manufactured in the United States. The material is not only reusable, but soft, stretchy, flexible, and durable. A representative from Sister Namibia says: “they have no reports of discomfort or allergies.” Some of the girls in the SisterPADS program who previously used pillow stuffing and other materials prior to the implementation of the program are now attending school and engage in social activities without fear of embarrassment. SisterPADS has provided menstrual pad kits to approximately seven hundred and sixty girls in Namibia through donations and support across the globe and is anticipating to expand their reach.
