= Namrights =

Namibian non-profit human rights organization

Namrights logo

NamRights, formerly National Society for Human Rights (NSHR), is a Namibian non-profit human rights organization, led by Phil ya Nangoloh who founded the institution in 1989.
