= Phil ya Nangoloh =

Namibian human rights practitioner (born 1954)

Phil ya Nangoloh (born on 22 September 1954 in Ogongo in the Omusati region) is a Namibian human rights practitioner. He heads the organisation Namrights, formerly Namibia's National Society for Human Rights (NSHR). NamRights focuses on monitoring and reporting human rights conditions in Namibia, often addressing issues such as police brutality, government accountability, and civil liberties.

== Early life ==
He was born on 22 September 1954 in Ogongo, located in the Omusati Region of northern Namibia.

== Education ==
Nangoloh left Namibia in 1974 and worked as a sheep and cattle herder in Angola. He was imprisoned in Zaire under the pretext of spying for Rhodesia and was released at the request of Hisham Omayad of the United Nations Council for Namibia and subsequently transferred to the South West Africa People's Organizarion in Lusaka.

Nangoloh pursued further education while with SWAPO and started educational opportunities for Namibians abroad. His time in exile exposed him to international networks and institutions, shaping his understanding of governance, human rights, and international law. These experiences contributed significantly to his later work as a human rights advocate and critic of government practices in independent Namibia.

== Career ==
In November 1974 he became a member of the People's Liberation Army of Namibia (PLAN).

He was later sent to the Soviet Union where he received military training and completed a degree in radio engineering. Following a visit to Finland, he came under suspicion by SWAPO leadership of espionage. Before he was deported to SWAPO controlled camps in Angola, he escaped from the Soviet Union but failed trying to apply for political asylum in Switzerland. In 1981, he was deported to the United States where he secured a grant as part of the UN Council for Namibia to study electrical engineering. In the late 80s he returned to Namibia where he advocated for the release of detainees by SWAPO in exile.

Ya Nangoloh acknowledged that SWAPO committed many grave human rights injustices and operated the “Lubango dungeons,” where killings and torture of suspected spies of the South African apartheid regime allegedly took place.

In 1989, he founded the National Society for Human Rights of Namibia (NSHR) now known as NamRights which has since extensively reported on a variety of human rights issues.

In 2021, he rejoined the South West Africa People's Organization (SWAPO) party, with media cover

In 2023, he publicly defended Namibia’s constitutional right to protest and criticized alleged violations in alignment of civil liberties reinforcing his long-standing advocacy for human rights and democratic principles.
