= Lists of African films =

The following is a list of African films. It is arranged alphabetically by country of origin.

== Botswana ==
Year	Title	Director	Genre	Notes
1980	The Gods Must Be Crazy	Jamie Uys	comedy	the first of The Gods Must Be Crazy film series
1989	The Gods Must Be Crazy II	Jamie Uys	comedy	part of The Gods Must Be Crazy film series

== Burundi ==
Year	Title	Director	Genre	Notes
1992	Gito l'ingrat	Léonce Ngabo		

== Cape Verde ==
Year	Title	Director	Genre	Notes
2000	Amílcar Cabral	Ana Ramos Lisoba	documentary	
2024	Hanami	Denise Fernandes	Drama	

== Djibouti ==
Year	Title	Director	Genre	Notes
2011	Laan = girls, friends = Les copines	Lula Ali Ismail	drama	

== Equatorial Guinea ==
Year	Title	Director	Genre	Notes
2015	Aricó caliente	Raimundo Bernabé Nnandong	drama	
2016	Desamparad@s	Raimundo Bernabé Nnandong	drama	

== Eritrea ==
Year	Title	Director	Genre	Notes
2001	White Hotel	Dianne Griffin, Tobi Solvang	documentary	

== Gambia ==
- Welcome to the Smiling Coast: Living in the Gambian Ghetto
- Jaha's Promise

== Ghana ==
Year	Title	Director	Genre	Notes
1952	The Boy Kumasenu	Sean Graham		
1980	Love Brewed in the African Pot	Kwaw Ansah		
1987	Zinabu	William Akuffo and Richard Quartey		
1993	Sankofa	Haile Gerima	drama	This film is Burkinabé, but shot in Ghana.
2005	Emmanuel's Gift	Lisa Lax and Nancy Stern	documentary	
2006	Run Baby Run	Emmanuel Apea	action	
2006	A Goat's Tail	Julius Amedume		
2007	Princess Tyra	Frank Rajah Arase	drama	
2009	A Sting in a Tale	Shirley Frimpong-Manso	thriller	
2010	Coz Ov Moni	King Luu	musical	
2010	Sinking Sands	Leila Djansi	drama	
2011	An African Election	Jarreth and Kevin Merz	documentary	
2011	Ties That Bind	Leila Djansi	drama	
2012	Contract	Shirley Frimpong-Manso		
2013	Coz Ov Moni 2 (FOKN Revenge)	King Luu	musical	
2015	Heaven	Abu Idi - Haus of Euphorium	thriller	
2021	Borga	York-Fabian Raabe	drama	German-Ghanaian co-production

== Guinea-Bissau ==
Year	Title	Director	Genre	Notes
1988	Mortu Nega	Flora Gomes	historical drama	

== Lesotho ==
- Goldwidows: Women in Lesotho 1991

== Libya ==
Year	Title	Director	Genre	Notes
1972	When Fate Hardens (also known as Destiny is Very Hard)	Abdella Zarok	feature film	
1974	The Road	Mohamed Shaaban	feature film	
1976	Mohammad, Messenger of God (also known as The Message)	Moustapha Akkad	biographical adventure drama	
1977	Les Ambassadeurs	Naceur Ktar	drama	
1977	The Green Light (al-Daw' al-Akhdar)	Abedalla Mushbahi		
1981	Lion of the Desert	Moustapha Akkad	biographical war drama	
1983	Battle of Tagrift (Ma'rakat Taqraft)	Mushafa Kashem and Mohamed Ayad Driza	war drama	
1985	The Bomb Shell (al-Shaziya) (also known as The Splinter)	Mohamed Ferjani		
1986	Love in Narrow Alleys (Hub fi al-aziqa al-dayiqa)	Muhamad Abd al-Jalil Qanidi		
1993/4	Symphony of Rain (Ma'azufatu al-matar)	Abdella Zarok		

== Madagascar ==
Year	Title	Director	Genre	Notes
1988	Tabataba	Raymond Rajaonarivelo		
2004	Souli	Alexander Abela	drama	

== Malawi ==
Year	Title	Director	Genre	Notes
2003	Lifecycles: A Story of AIDS in Malawi	Sierra Bellows, Doug Karr	documentary	

== Morocco ==
- Tes Cheveux Noirs Ihsan (2006)

== Namibia ==
Year	Title	Director	Genre	Notes
1989	Red Scorpion	Joseph Zito	action adventure	
2007	Namibia: The Struggle for Liberation	Charles Burnett	drama	
2009	Rider without a Horse	Tim Huebschle	short film	
2011	Looking for Iilonga	Tim Huebschle	short film	
2015	Katutura	Florian Schott	drama	
2019	Hairareb	Oshoveli Shipoh	drama	
2019	#LANDoftheBRAVEfilm	Tim Huebschle	thriller	
2020	Walking Forward	Tim Huebschle, Ndinomholo Ndilula	web series	

== Rwanda ==
Year	Title	Director	Genre	Notes
2001	100 Days	Nick Hughes	drama	
2004	Hotel Rwanda	Terry George	historical drama war	
2005	Sometimes in April	Raoul Peck	historical drama war television film	
2007	Munyurangabo	Lee Isaac Chung		
2012	Ibara	Tom Nkusi/Emmy Ruzindana	action	

== Sierra Leone ==
Year	Title	Director	Genre	Notes
2000	Cry Freetown	Sorious Samura	documentary	
2012	SALAY	Ali Kamanda	short-film	

== Somalia ==
Year	Title	Director	Genre	Notes
1987	Geedka nolosha	Abdulkadir Ahmed Said		
1992	La Conchiglia	Abdulkadir Ahmed Said		

== South Sudan ==
- Jebel Nyoka
- The Nuer

== Sudan ==
Year	Title	Director	Genre	Notes
2005	God Grew Tired of Us	Christopher Dillon Quinn, Tommy Walker	documentary	

== Tanzania ==
Year	Title	Director	Genre	Notes
2001	Maangamizi: The Ancient One	Martin Mhando, Ron Mulvihill	drama	
2003	Bongoland	Josiah Kibira		

== Togo ==
Year	Title	Director	Genre	Notes
1972	Kouami	Metonou Do Kokou	short	
1979	Au rendez-vous du rêve abêti	Kodjo Goncalves	short documentary	
1986	The Blooms of Banjeli	Carlyn Saltman	short documentary	
1988	Bawina	Minza Bataba	short	
1991	Ashakara	Gérard Louvin		
1994	Femmes aux yeux ouverts	Anne-Laure Folly	documentary	
1996	Les Oubliées	Anne-Laure Folly	documentary	
1999	Sarah Maldoror ou la nostalgie de l'utopie	Anne-Laure Folly	documentary	
2002	Le Dilemme d'Eya	Adjiké Assouma	short drama	

== Uganda ==
Year	Title	Director	Genre	Notes
1998	Guns for Sale	Richard Alwyn	documentary	
2001	ABC Africa	Abbas Kiarostami	documentary	
2006	Invisible Children		short documentary	
2010	Who Killed Captain Alex?	Nabwana IGG	action film	
2010	Yogera	Donald Mugisha	drama film	
2011	Hello	Usama Mukwaya	short	
2011	State Research Bureau			
2012	The Life	Nana Kagga	drama film	
2013	In Just Hours	Usama Mukwaya	short	
2013	The Route			
2014	Bala Bala Sese			
2015	Tiktok	Usama Mukwaya	short	
2015	Sipi			
2016	Queen of Katwe	Mira Nair	sports drama	
2016	Bad Black	Nabwana IGG	action film	
2017	Kony: Order from Above	Steve T. Ayeny	war film	
2018	Veronica's Wish	Rehema Nanfuka	feature film	Drama film
2018	BreadWinner	Ochwo emmax	short film	Drama film
2021	Black Glove	Angella Emurwon	Mystery-thriller	Produced at Sebamala Arts in conjunction with SOLOFX in Uganda.

== Western Sahara ==
Year	Title	Director	Genre	Notes
1976	Sahara Occidental indépendance ou génocide?	Collective direction	documentary	
2011	Wilaya	Pedro Pérez Rosado	drama	
2012	La Badil (No Other Choice)	Dominic Brown	short documentary	

== Zaire ==
Year	Title	Director	Genre	Notes
1996	Macadam tribu	José Zeka Laplaine		

== Zimbabwe ==
- Forbidden Fruit (2000)

== See also ==
- Cinema of Africa
- Lists of films
