= Sarah Maldoror ou la nostalgie de l'utopie =

- Directed by: Anne-Laure Folly
- Narrated by: Anne-Laure Folly
- Cinematography: Jean-Claude Ducouret
- Edited by: A. Balaman
- Music by: Bedo Goungel
- Production companies: RFO (France), Amanou Production (France)
- Release date: 1999
- Running time: 26 minutes
- Language: French

Sarah Maldoror ou la nostalgie de l'utopie is a Togolese short documentary film directed by Anne-Laure Folly. It was released in 1999.

The film is a tribute to Sarah Maldoror of Guadeloupe, who made the classic film Sambizanga (1972). The film documents the constant political struggle in all her work for liberty, her affirmation of her négritude to the world, and her campaign for recognition of black poets. At the 1997 FESPACO press conference for her new film Les Oubliées, Anne-Laure Folly Reimann had already paid honor to Sarah Maldoror, saying:

Sarah inspired me to do this film. She made a film called Sambizanga, which in my opinion is one of the masterpieces of African cinema. When I saw it, I had a desire to make a film about Angola. She cleared the way by showing the Angola liberation war from a woman’s perspective. My film is not groundbreaking; she has already done that.
