= Armas Shivute =

Namibian film actor

- Born: Armas Shivute; 1974 (age 50–51); Katutura, Namibia
- Occupations: Director, Actor, Writer
- Years active: 1999–present

Armas Shivute Armas (born 1974), is a Namibian actor, director and writer. He is best known for the roles in the films such as Katutura, #LANDoftheBRAVEfilm and Everything Happens for a Reason .

== Personal life ==
He was born on 1974 in Katutura State Hospital, Katutura. He later grew up with his grandparents in the village Omuthitu-Gwalwani in Omusati and became a shepherd. In 1992, he entered school stage. He completed a diploma in African Performing Arts at the College of the Arts (COTA). Veteran Namibian actor Armas Shivute has dedicated his Best Actor in Southern Africa award of the 2021 Sotigui Awards to the Namibian people.

Shivute was named winner on Saturday evening in Ouagadougou, Burkina Faso for his role in the ‘Land of the Brave’ film.

He became the third Namibian to win the award in three consecutive years, following Adriano Visagie in 2019 for the film ‘Salute’ and Girley Jazama in 2020 for the film ‘The White Line

== Career ==
Shivute started his career with stage plays under the guidance of Tulimeyo Kaapanda after joining with Bricks Community Project. Meanwhile in 1999, he staged successful productions including: My Big Brother. The play later won the award at the College of the Arts (COTA) Youth Theatre Festival. Then he made the plays Daily Hair Salon and Barber in 2005, Shot in the Foot in 2008 and Efundula. Efundula was produced accompany with the Eenhana Community Theatre group between 2006 and 2007. In 2006, he won the award for the Best Play in at the City of Windhoek Festival.

Apart from theatre, he also acted in several feature and short films such as No free Lunch directed by Vickson Hangula. In 2015, he appeared in the award winning film Katutura directed by Obed Emvula and Florian Scott, where he played the role "Mouton". He also acted in the films: Where Others Wavered directed by PACON. He also featured in the serial One Fine Day telecast by NBC as well as in the serial The Next of Kin, a British Production and first Namibian series on NBC 1. Then he made supportive roles in the film The Ties that Bind, Tit for Tat and Love and Respect directed by Dudley Vial. In the meantime, Shivute joined the plays: President Khaya Africa by Theatre for Africa in Cape Town, then Katutura 59 produced by Fredrick Phillander, Joseph’s Dillema directed by Vickson Hangula and Shebeen Queen produced by Jacques Nashilongweshipwe Mushandja. In 2012, he won the Best Actor award at the Film and Theatre Awards for his role in the play Shebeen Queen. In the same year, he acted in the film Try with the role "Bra Ompie". For this role, he won the Award for the Best Male Actor Theatre at this year's Namibia Film and Theatre awards.

Otherthan acting, he also worked for the National Theatre of Namibia on a project called Youth Theatre Development Project (YTDP), where he teach theatre, from acting, producing, directing, writing and marketing for young people. He also conducted several workshops for many companies such as "L?eritz" from the 'Seaflower White Fish Corporation'. He was nominated in Sotigui for the Best Actor of Southern Africa category in 2021 for the film #LandoftheBraveFilm.

== Filmography ==
Year	Film	Role	Genre	Ref.
2010	Tirza	BBQ vendor	Film	
2012	Try	Bra-Ompie	Short film	
2012	CamelThorns	Poacher	Short film	
2013	Everything Happens for a Reason		Short film	
2015	Katutura	Mouton	Film	
2017	The Unlikely Encounter	Michael Strydom	Film	
2019	#LANDoftheBRAVEfilm	Shivute	Film	
