= 100 Years of Etosha =

2007 Namibian documentary directed by Tim Huebschle

- Directed by: Tim Huebschle
- Screenplay by: Virginia Witts
- Produced by: Gert Jacobie; Tim Huebschle
- Cinematography: Nokokure Zaire
- Edited by: Tim Huebschle
- Music by: Christian Polloni; Mario Vermeulen
- Distributed by: Republikein
- Release date: 2007
- Running time: 43 minutes
- Country: Namibia
- Languages: English, Afrikaans, German

100 Years of Etosha is a Namibian documentary directed and edited by Tim Huebschle. Set in the Etosha National Park, the film chronicles the park's history from its proclamation as game reserve in 1907 to 2007 which marked Etosha's centenary.

== Production ==
100 Years of Etosha was commissioned by Democratic Media Holdings and was shot during November 2006 on location in and around Okaukuejo, Halali and Namutoni, the major tourist rest camps inside the national park.

== Archive Material ==
The documentary incorporates substantial archive material consisting of photographs, paintings, 16 mm film, 8 mm film and VHS footage, providing ample visuals spanning the first 100 years of Etosha. Most notably, the former park warden Stoffel Rocher had an 8 mm film camera with which he documented his time in Etosha from 1957 - 1969. The Denver-African Expedition of 1925 features Etosha's original inhabitants, the Haiǁom people. Some film material from the expedition has been edited into 100 Years of Etosha.

== Release ==
100 Years of Etosha was released as a DVD in March 2007. The trilingual DVD featured narrations in English, Afrikaans and German with accompanying subtitles. In April 2007 the documentary won the Audience Choice Award at the Namibian Film Awards.
