= Walvis Tale =

2024 Namibian documentary directed by Tim Huebschle

- Film poster
- Directed by: Tim Huebschle
- Screenplay by: Tim Huebschle; Taati Niilenge
- Produced by: David Benade
- Starring: Thomas Morkel; Letesia Uanes; Star Boois; Jan du Plessis; Magdalena Gamathams; Carlos Gideon
- Cinematography: Hein van Zijl
- Edited by: Tim Huebschle
- Music by: Vaughn Ahrens
- Production company: Collective Productions Namibia
- Release date: March 1, 2024
- Running time: 24 minutes
- Country: Namibia
- Languages: Afrikaans, English, Oshivambo

Walvis Tale is a Namibian documentary directed by Tim Huebschle. Set in Walvis Bay, Namibia, the documentary unpacks the layered relationship the harbour town's inhabitants have with fish.

== Production ==
Walvis Tale received funding from the Namibia Film Commission and was shot on location in Walvis Bay during September 2023. The six interviewees were identified by co-writer Taati Niilenge, drawing on her background as a community journalist.

== Premiere ==
The documentary premiered as part of the 30th anniversary celebrations of Walvis Bay’s reintegration into Namibia on 1 March 2024.

== Awards & Nominations ==
Walvis Tale won the Audience Choice Award at the Namibia Film Week in 2024. At the 41st Vues d'Afrique film festival, Walvis Tale received a Special Mention in the Sustainable Development category. The documentary was also nominated in two categories at the 2025 Africa Magic Viewers' Choice Awards, namely Best Documentary and Best Indigenous Language (Southern Africa). In Kenya, Walvis Tale received the Best Documentary (Social Impact) Award at the inaugural YORA Summit. In France, the film won the Ubuntu de Bronze Award for short documentaries at L'Afrique Fait Son Cinéma in Paris.
