= The Forests of a Desert Land =

2022 Namibian docuseries directed by Tim Huebschle

- Film Poster
- Directed by: Tim Huebschle
- Screenplay by: Tim Huebschle
- Produced by: Clemens von Doderer; David Benade; Tim Huebschle
- Cinematography: Haiko Boldt
- Edited by: Tim Huebschle
- Production company: Collective Productions Namibia
- Release date: April 6, 2022
- Running time: 3 x 4 minutes
- Country: Namibia
- Languages: Oshivambo, Mbukushu, Kwangali

The Forests of a Desert Land is a Namibian docuseries directed by Tim Huebschle. Set in northeastern Namibia between Okongo, Rundu and Divundu, the series explores the forest regions of the country. Told through the eyes of a school girl, a marathon runner and a farmer, the deforestation and subsequent desertification take centre stage in the series, all the while raising awareness about the importance of forests as ecosystems for humans and the environment.

== Production ==
The Forests of a Desert Land received funding from the Hanns Seidel Foundation and was shot on location in the Ohangwena and Kavango East regions of Namibia during October 2021.

== Premiere ==
The docuseries premiered on 6 April 2022. The Minister of Environment, Forestry and Tourism Pohamba Shifeta attended the premiere and underlined that healthy forests are essential for humanity's survival during his keynote address.

== Film Festivals ==
The Forests of a Desert Land had its international premiere at the Dances with Films festival in Los Angeles during June 2022. Later that year, The Forests of a Desert Land screened at the International Documentary & Short Film Festival of Kerala, India. The docuseries also participated in the Pan African Film Festival and the Silicon Valley African Film Festival respectively.
