= Jobina Shovaleka =

Namibian writer

- Born: 24 August 2012 (age 14)
- Citizenship: Namibian
- Education: Windhoek Gymnasium (2026) Pionierspark Primary School (2019–2025)
- Occupation: Writer
- Writing career
- Notable work: Jobina Foundation
- Notable awards: Best children’s literature

Jobina Shovaleka (born 24 August 2012) is a Namibian writer.

== Personal life ==
Jobina Shovaleka was born on 24 August 2012. Jobina attended her primary school at Pionierspark primary school from grade 1–7 and that's the time she published her first book.

== Writing journey ==
Shovaleka started writing when she was in primary school.

Shovaleka self-published her first book, The Aliens, when she was 12 years old in 2025, through Victoria Authors Self-Publishing Services. She published her second book, That one girl named Lilly, on 23 October 2026.

== Awards ==
- 2025 African Authors Recognition Awards' Best Female Author
- 2025 African Authors Recognition Awards' African Author of the Year
- 2025 African Authors Recognition Awards' Best Children's Writer from Namibia
