= Hand-holder =

2023 Namibian film directed by Tim Huebschle

- Directed by: Tim Huebschle
- Screenplay by: Ndinomholo Ndilula
- Produced by: David Benade
- Starring: Ndinomholo Ndilula; Adriano Visagie; Ndayola Ulenga
- Cinematography: Antonius Tsuob
- Edited by: Miranda Christian
- Music by: Vaughn Ahrens
- Production companies: Multichoice Namibia; Collective Productions Namibia; Namibian Broadcasting Corporation
- Release date: September 6, 2023
- Running time: 50 minutes
- Country: Namibia
- Language: English

Hand-holder is a Namibian LGBTQ+ film directed by Tim Huebschle.

== Plot ==
Katanga, grieving the death of his husband, loses his job as a substitute radio presenter after calling for an end to government-subsidised arts funding. Seeking refuge from the city, he moves into a defunct souvenir shop inherited from his late husband. Here he meets Enrico whose family owns the surrounding land and who tries to persuade Katanga to sell the shop. When that fails, Enrico hires protesting artists and a clairvoyant labour inspector, but Katanga perseveres. He breaths new life into the shop and discovers an appreciation for arts and crafts. As he embraces change and experiments with podcasting, Katanga gradually comes to terms with his grief, even considering the possibility of love with the farmer next door.

== Production notes ==
The film was produced as part of the 2022 Multichoice Namibia & Namibian Broadcasting Corporation local content initiative Mukorob.

It premiered on Showmax alongside the other 12 films made as part of Project Mukorob on 6 September 2023.

== Cast ==
- Ndinomholo Ndilula as Katanga
- Adriano Visagie as Enrico
- Ndayola Ulenga as Stella
