= Chinese people in Namibia =

Regions with significant populations
- Windhoek · Oshakati

Languages
- Chinese · English

The number of Chinese people in Namibia has grown tremendously since independence.

== Migration history ==
As recently as 1998, China Radio International reported there to be only fifty Chinese people doing business in Namibia, but by 2005 that had grown to more than a thousand. A 2009 U.S. embassy estimate released in the United States diplomatic cables leak states there are three or four thousand. Opposition politicians such as Jurie Viljoen of Monitor Action Group have made accusations that uncontrolled issuance of work permits has led to an influx of as many as 40,000 Chinese labourers, a figure confirmed by Malia Politzer.

== Trade ==
In the 2000s, trade between China and Namibia grew, rising from in $75 million in 2003 to $600 million in 2009. China City, a wholesale and retail centre located in an industrial area of northern Windhoek about 20 minutes from downtown, was opened in 1998 by Li Chengyuan (李澄原), a businessman from Taiwan; by 2005, merchants there were importing about 1,000 containers of goods per year from China.

Many Chinese migrants establish small retail businesses particularly in clothing and jewelry. The arrival of Chinese traders has drawn complaints from local traders about competition and concern about quality and safety. However, some Namibians welcomed the addition of Chinese in the retail sector citing the benefit of employment creation and lower costs of goods.

Oshikango, on the border with Angola has become a popular destination for Chinese traders hoping to take advantage of expanding cross-border trade. By 2004, the town had 22 Chinese-owned shops, expanding to 75 by 2006. From shoes and textiles, these shops have expanded their product offerings to include furniture, home electronics, motorcycles, artificial flowers, and various other types of goods. Shop owners import their goods through the ports at Walvis Bay or Durban in South Africa, and bring them in by rail for storage in bonded warehouses, where they are then sold on to Angolan traders for export to Angola in small quantities, thus avoiding customs duties. In some cases, Chinese businesspeople have set up factories in Oshikango. However these do not produce genuinely competitive goods; their main function is to get work permits for Chinese expatriates who can then work as shop assistants in import/export businesses.

== Integration and community ==
There are a few Chinese restaurants (three in Windhoek) and grocery stores in the country. The restaurants are popular among local Namibians.

The embassy's Chinese New Year celebration in 2010 reportedly attracted more than 1,000 Chinese guests, including migrants, international students, and representatives of Chinese multinationals stationed in the country, as well as about 100 local people.

== See also ==
- Angolans in Namibia
- German Namibians

== Bibliography ==
- Alden, Chris; Large, Daniel; Soares de Oliveira, Ricardo (2008), China returns to Africa: a rising power and a continent embrace, Columbia University Press, ISBN 978-0-231-70098-6
