= Yarri Kamara =

Sierra Leonean-Ugandan activist, policy researcher, writer and literary translator

Yarri Kamara is a Sierra Leonean-Ugandan policy researcher, writer and literary translator of French and Italian.

Kamara's essays and poems have featured in publications including Courrier International, Lolwe, Brittle Paper, Africa is a Country, The Republic, African Arguments and Welt-Sichten. For her non-fiction and poetry, she has been awarded a Villa Saint-Louis Ndar residency and a Goethe Institut African Writers residency, as well as a Sevhage Literary Prize shortlist. In 2023, she was an editor of Sahara: A Thousand Paths Into the Future, an anthology dedicated to the voices of the Sahara, intended as an accompaniment to the Swiss arts festival, Culturescapes.

Kamara's 2022 translation of Burkinabé author Monique Ilboudo’s So Distant From My Life was the winner of a PEN Heim Award and was shortlisted for the US National Translation in Prose Award in 2023.

== Life and career ==
Kamara was born in Sierra Leone; but grew up in Kenya, Uganda, Djibouti and Germany. As a Jefferson Scholar, she studied economics and French literature and language at the University of Virginia in the US and completed her master's degree in international affairs from Sciences Po in Paris, France. Having lived in Burkina Faso for two decades, she is currently based in Milan, Italy.

Kamara is fluent in French, Italian and Krio, and can reasonably read Spanish and Portuguese.
