= Another Sunny Day (film) =

2017 Namibian short film

- Directed by: Tim Huebschle
- Story by: Tim Huebschle
- Produced by: Tim Huebschle; Haiko Boldt
- Starring: Paulus Johannes
- Cinematography: Haiko Boldt
- Edited by: Haiko Boldt
- Music by: Christof van Niekerk
- Production company: Collective Productions Namibia
- Distributed by: Collective Productions Namibia
- Release date: 21 September 2017 (Jozi)
- Running time: 4 minutes
- Country: Namibia
- Language: Khoekhoe

Another Sunny Day is a 2017 Namibian documentary short film directed by Tim Huebschle and co-produced by director himself along with Haiko Boldt. The documentary film stars Paulus Johannes and his life as a person living with albinism in one of the hottest parts of Namibia. The film made its premiere on August 4, 2017 at the Jozi Film Festival Discovery Channel Don't Stop Wondering, Johannesburg, South Africa.

The film was screened at the Cannes Film Festival on Disability in 2017 and received positive acclaim from critics.

== Cast ==
- Paulus Johannes

== Nominations and awards ==
=== Nominations ===
- Changing Perspectives Short Film Festival (2018): Best Short Film
- InShort Film Festival (2018): Best Documentary
- Jozi Film Festivall (2017): Best Short Documentary
- Milan African Film Festival (2018): Best Short Film

=== Awards ===
==== Winner ====
- KRAF International Short Film Festival (2017): Best Documentary
