= Tim Huebschle =

Namibian film director and screenwriter (born 1978)

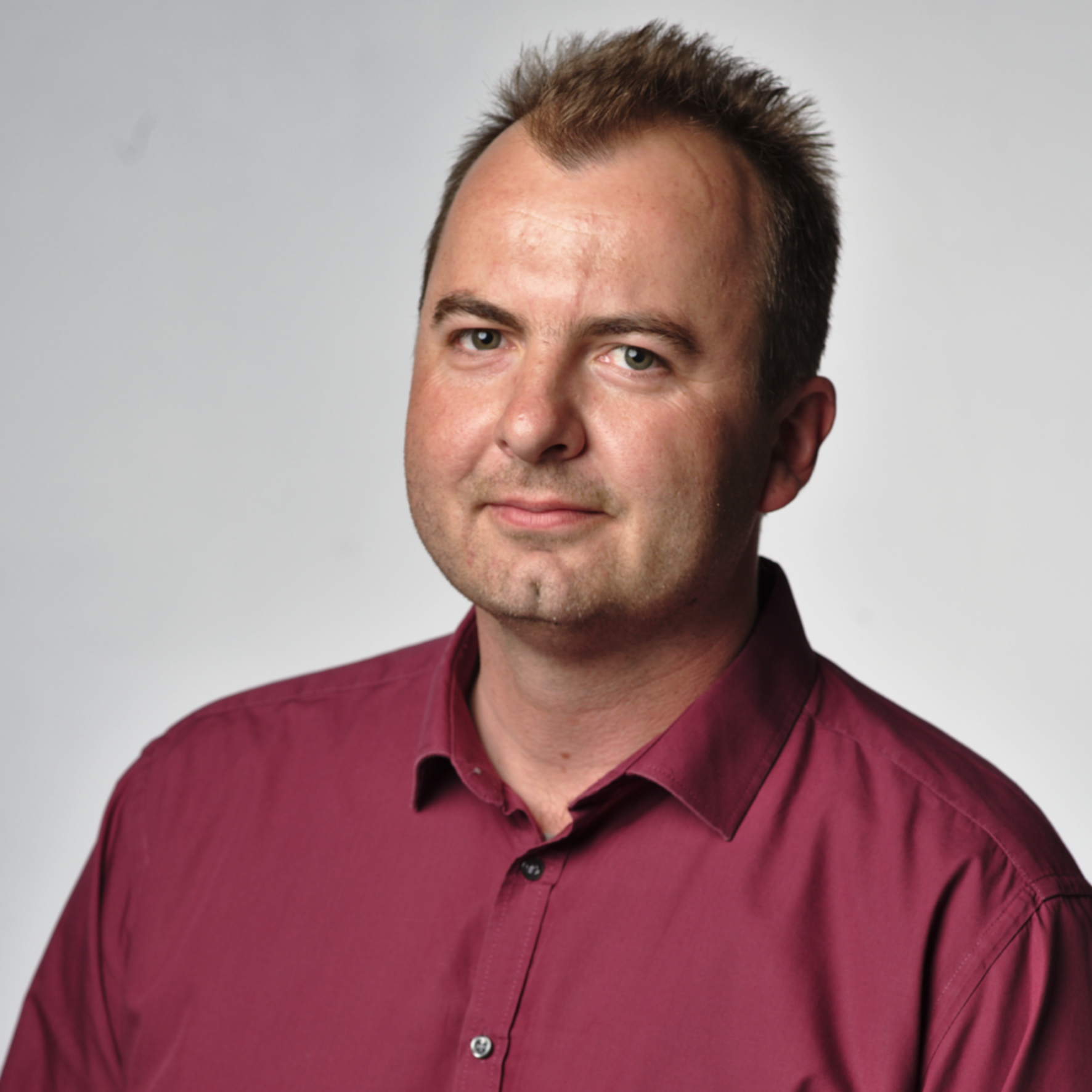
- Born: May 24, 1978 (age 48); Reutlingen, Germany
- Occupations: Film Director; Screenwriter; Producer; Editor
- Spouse: Meunajo Tjiroze (m. 2019)
- Parents: Otto Hübschle (father); Michaela Hübschle (mother)
- Website: collective.com.na

Tim Huebschle is a Namibian film director and screenwriter. His films are characterised by real-life scenarios, often blending documentary and fictional elements to highlight social and cultural themes relevant to Namibia.

== Biography ==
After completing his high school in Windhoek, Tim Huebschle relocated to Cape Town and earned a Bachelor of Arts in English & German Literature at the University of Cape Town. During his studies, he participated in a few film theory seminars and subsequently chose to follow a career in the film industry. He started making independent short films in 2000, after leaving South Africa and moving to Berlin to pursue internships at production companies in the German capital. In 2003 he returned to Namibia where he had secured a production budget for Savanna Stories, a 13-part documentary series, aired on the Namibian Broadcasting Corporation (NBC). After winding up the series in 2005 Huebschle continued to work as director on a wide range of short films, documentaries, music videos and commercials. Throughout the years he collected numerous local and international accolades for his work. In 2009 he co-founded the Namibian film production company Collective Productions. In 2013/14 he directed 26 episodes of a documentary series and 20 episodes of a children's series for the afternoon programming of the German TV station ARD. Huebschle premiered his debut full-length feature entitled #LANDoftheBRAVEfilm in October 2019.

== Awards and nominations ==
Year	Awards Event	Nominated work	Category	Result
2007	Channel O Music Video Awards	Mokasie – Gazza	Best Kwaito	Won
2008	Channel O Music Video Awards	Chokola – Lady May	Best Dance Video	Won
2012	Silicon Valley African Film Festival	Looking for Iilonga	Best Short Film	Won
2013	Africa Movie Academy Awards	Dead River	Best Short Film	Nominated
2013	Silicon Valley African Film Festival	Dead River	Best Short Film	Won
2019	Namibian Theatre & Film Awards	Another Sunny Day	Best Documentary	Won
2019	Namibian Theatre & Film Awards	Another Sunny Day	Best Sound & Music	Won
2020	Silicon Valley African Film Festival	#LANDoftheBRAVEfilm	Best Narrative Feature	Won
2021	Uganda Film Festival	#LANDoftheBRAVEfilm	Best International Feature Film	Won
2021	Urban Mediamakers Film Festival	Walking Forward	Best International Web Series	Won
2025	Africa Magic Viewers' Choice Awards	Walvis Tale	Best Documentary	Nominated
2025	Vues d'Afrique	Walvis Tale	Sustainable Development Prize	Won
2025	L'Afrique Fait Son Cinéma	Walvis Tale	Ubuntu de Bronze	Won

== Selected filmography ==
Year	Title	Genre	Director	Writer	Producer	Editor	Notes
2004 - 2005	Savanna Stories	TV series	Yes	Yes	Yes	Yes	directed & wrote 6 episodes; edited 9 episodes
2006	100 Years of Etosha	Documentary	Yes	No	Yes	Yes	
2007	Beef	Short film	Yes	No	Yes	Yes	
2007	Mokasie – Gazza	Music video	Yes	Yes	No	Yes	
2007	Chokola – Lady May	Music video	Yes	Yes	Yes	Yes	
2009	Rider without a Horse	Short film	Yes	Yes	Yes	Yes	co-written with Jana von Hase
2011	Looking for Iilonga	Short film	Yes	Yes	No	No	co-written with Nailoke Mhanda
2012	Dead River	Short film	Yes	Yes	No	No	co-written with Rolf Ackermann
2013 - 2015	Das Waisenhaus für wilde Tiere	TV series	Yes	Yes	No	No	
2017	Another Sunny Day	Documentary	Yes	Yes	Yes	No	
2017	Oom Land	Documentary	Yes	Yes	Yes	No	co-written with Ernst Steynberg
2017	Nikhita’s Dancing Feet	Documentary	Yes	Yes	Yes	No	
2019	Hafeni – The Man of Mondesa	Documentary	Yes	Yes	Yes	No	
2019	#LANDoftheBRAVEfilm	Feature film	Yes	Yes	No	No	
2020 - 2022	Walking Forward	Docuseries	Yes	No	Yes	Yes	
2022	The Forests of a Desert Land	Docuseries	Yes	Yes	No	Yes	
2022	More Than Just a Game	Docuseries	Yes	Yes	No	Yes	
2023	Hand-holder	Feature film	Yes	No	No	No	
2024	Walvis Tale	Documentary	Yes	Yes	No	Yes	co-written with Taati Niilenge
