= Looking for Iilonga =

2011 Namibian short film directed by Tim Huebschle

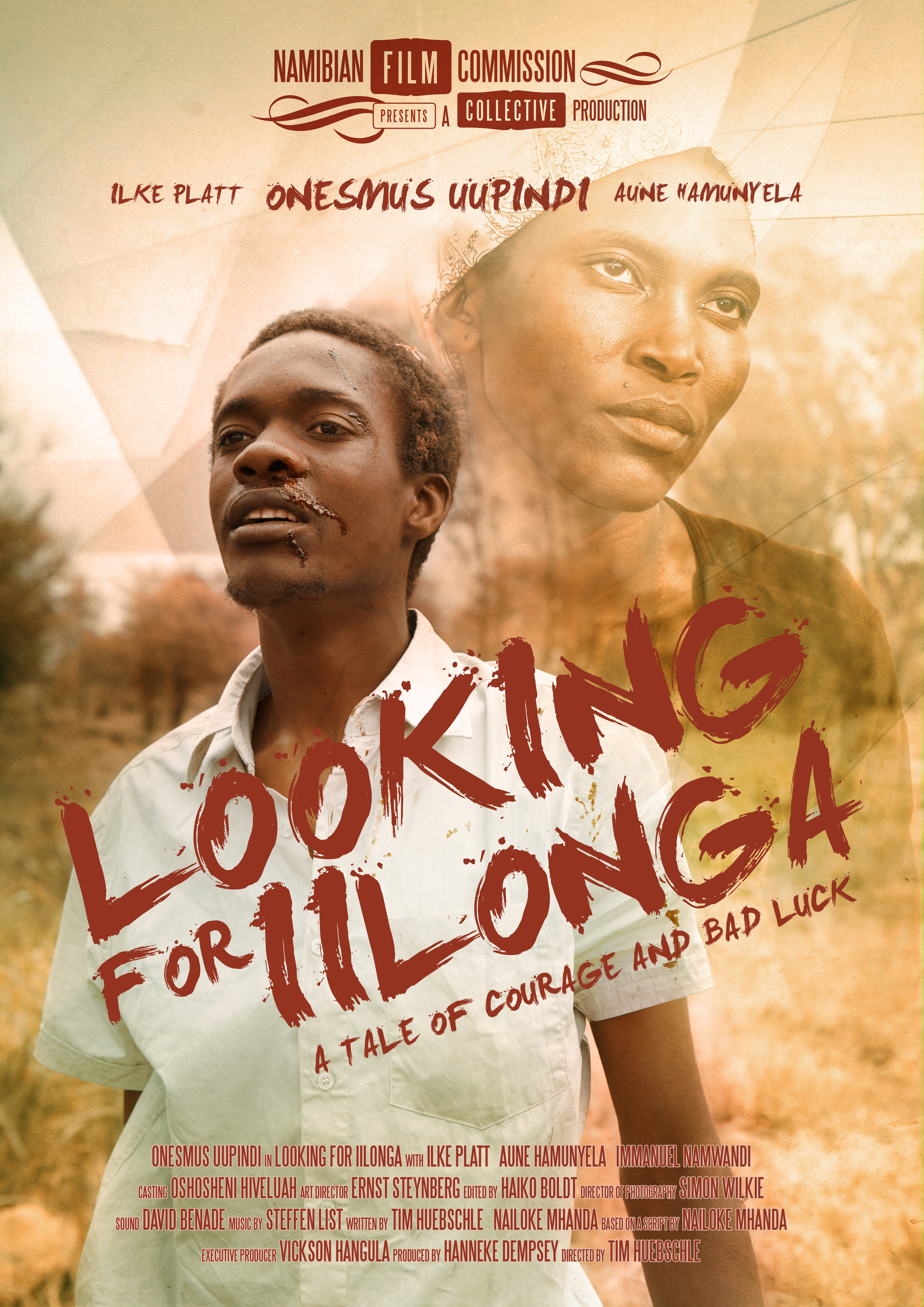
- Official poster
- Directed by: Tim Huebschle
- Screenplay by: Tim Huebschle; Nailoke Mhanda
- Produced by: Hanneke Dempsey
- Starring: Onesmus Uupindi; Ilke Platt; Aune Hamunyela
- Cinematography: Simon Wilkie
- Edited by: Haiko Boldt
- Music by: Steffen List
- Production company: Collective Productions Namibia
- Release date: April 9, 2011
- Running time: 18 minutes
- Country: Namibia
- Languages: Oshivambo, English

Looking for Iilonga is a Namibian short film directed by Tim Huebschle in 2011.

== Plot ==
Confronted by a loan shark who is collecting what he is owed, Simon is faced with one option only: he has to repay his family's debts. Ripped from his comfortable rural lifestyle, he travels far away to the big city, hoping to work off the debts. But from the moment he sets foot in the city, everything seems to be against Simon.

== Production ==
Looking for Iilonga was shot in and around Windhoek over four days in November 2010. The screenplay was written by Tim Huebschle and Nailoke Mhanda, based on an idea by Nailoke. The actors translated their respective lines into Oshivambo.

The film was uploaded to YouTube in February 2019. By June of the same year it was watched 75,000 times.

== Cast ==
- Onemus Uupindi as Simon
- Ilke Platt as Amanda
- Aune Hamunyela as Elizabeth
- Immanuel Namwandi as Kondjashili
