= Monique Ilboudo =

Burkinabé author and human rights activist

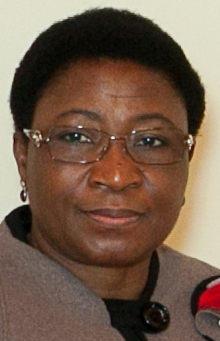
- Monique Ilboudo at a reception in Latvia on 16 October 2012
- Born: 1959 (age 66–67); Ouagadougou, Upper Volta
- Occupations: Lawyer, author
- Known for: Human rights activity

Monique Ilboudo (born 1959) is an author and human rights activist from Burkina Faso. As of 2012, she was Ambassador Extraordinary and Plenipotentiary of Burkina Faso to the Nordic and Baltic countries.

== Career ==
Monique Ilboudo was born in Ouagadougou, Upper Volta, in 1959. She studied law at the University of Ouagadougou, obtaining a bachelor's degree in 1982 and a master's degree in Private Law in 1983. She then studied at the Lille 2 University of Health and Law in France, gaining a diploma in advanced studies of private law in 1985. She obtained a PhD in private law at the Paris XII University in 1991, and became an assistant professor at the University of Ouagadougou. Between 1992 and 1995, she was the author of the column "Féminin Pluriel" in the Burkinabé daily paper L'Observateur Paalga. At the same time, she established Qui-vive, observing the condition of Burkinabé women. She became a founding member of the Supreme Council of Information from 1995 to 2000.

Ilboudo was one of the women portrayed by Anne-Laure Folly in her 1994 documentary Femmes aux yeux ouverts (Women with open eyes). The title of the film is from a poem that Ilboudo reads, which says: "A respectable woman should learn from her husband, she shouldn't read, she shouldn't have her eyes open." Ilboudo explains that in Burkina Faso, as in many African societies, men retain control over sexual relations. Procreation is the main factor, rather than love. Polygamy with the goal of reproduction and casual unprotected sex by the men exposes the women to a high risk of HIV/AIDS. Ilboudo summarizes the dilemma: "You can't take precautions to have kids!"

In 2000, Ilboudo was appointed Secretary of State for the Promotion of Human Rights. In June 2002, she was appointed Minister for the Promotion of Human Rights, a newly created position. She has argued that poverty is a violation of human rights, and has said that it will be hard to overcome poverty until economic, social and cultural rights reach the same level as political and civil rights.

She was appointed Ambassador Extraordinary and Plenipotentiary of Burkina Faso to the Nordic and Baltic countries. In April 2011, Burkina Faso established diplomatic relations with Latvia, and in October 2012 Ilboudo presented her credentials to Latvian President Andris Bērziņš. The Burkina Faso ambassador's residence is in Denmark.

== Author ==
Ilboudo has written many articles and several books, and is a major figure in Francophone African literature. In addition to her "Féminin Pluriel" column, she often contributed articles to the weekly Le Regard. In the preface to the third volume of collected articles from "Féminin Pluriel" she wrote:

If women take to writing a little more, take the microphone or the camera, they will not be so underrepresented in the media, which focus almost exclusively on keeping us informed of daily life, but life without women, is that really life? Men speak of women, yes, but the image that they present of them is not always very positive, and above all, it's not always an image of their reality: the aim is only to legitimize the established order in society and the position of the woman within it. This is a real danger and serious obstacle to change of attitudes relative to the current role and condition of women and an impediment to their achievement of concessions from the government for change.

Ilboudo received the national first prize for Best Novel with her 1992 Le Mal de Peau (The Ill of the Skin). The book was republished in 2001. It tells the story of a Burkinabé woman who is raped by a white soldier, and a young woman who is born from the rape. The young woman travels to Paris in search of her father, and falls in love with a white man. The novel deals sensitively with subjects such as the colonial experience, prejudice and miscegenation.

Murekatete, a novel written as part of the project "Rwanda, writing as a duty of memory", was published in 2001. Murekatete is the name of a woman, and means "let her live". The woman is haunted by memories of the Rwandan genocide. Trying to overcome her complex and return to normal life, she and her husband visit the memorial site at Murambi. The move only makes the problem worse. The story is written in the first person, in few words.

In 2006, Ilboudo published Droit de cité, être femme au Burkina Faso (Freedom of the City, being a woman in Burkina Faso).

== Bibliography ==
- Ilboudo, Monique (1992). Le mal de peau. Imprimerie Nationale du Burkina.
- Ilboudo, Monique (1992–1995). "Féminin Pluriel, un an de chroniques sur les femmes". Observateur Paalga.
- Ilboudo, Monique (1997–1999). "La Liberté matrimoniale et l'Infraction d'excision". Revue Burkinabé de Droit.
- Ilboudo, Monique; Djedanoum, Nocky (2000). Nyamirambo: recueil de poésies. Le Figuier. ISBN 978-2-84258-067-4.
- Ilboudo, Monique (2000). Murekatete. Lille: Editions du Figuier. p. 75.
- Ilboudo, Monique (2001). Le Mal de Peau. Le Serpent à Plumes.
- Ilboudo, Monique (2006). Droit de cité: être femme au Burkina Faso. les Éd. du remue-ménage. ISBN 978-2-89091-244-1.
- Si loin de ma vie (2018). So Distant from My Life, trans. Yarri Kamara (Tilted Axis Press, 2022)
- Carrefour des veuves (2020)

== Gallery ==
Some pictures from a reception in Latvia in October 2012, with Inese Lībiņa-Egnere:

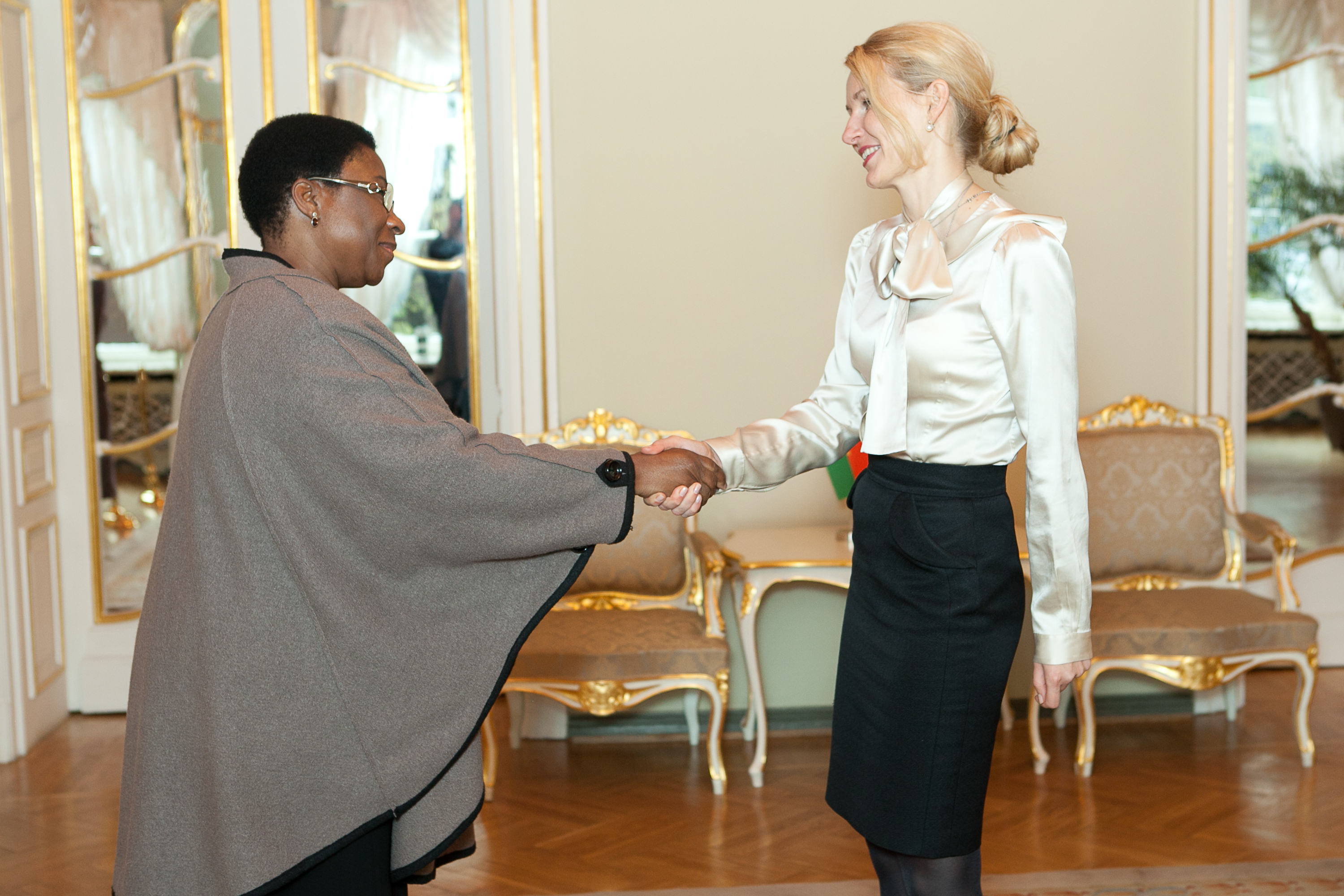

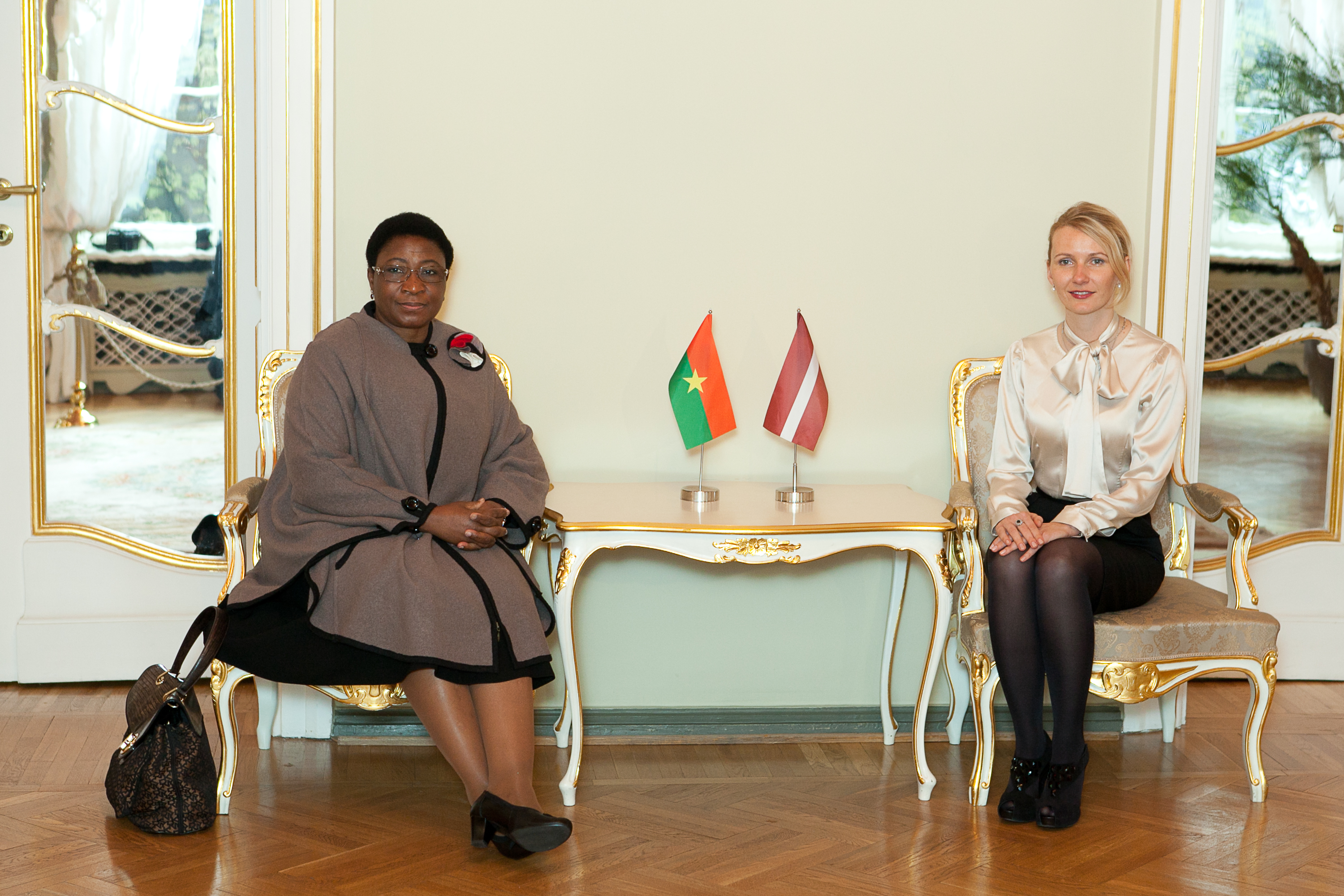

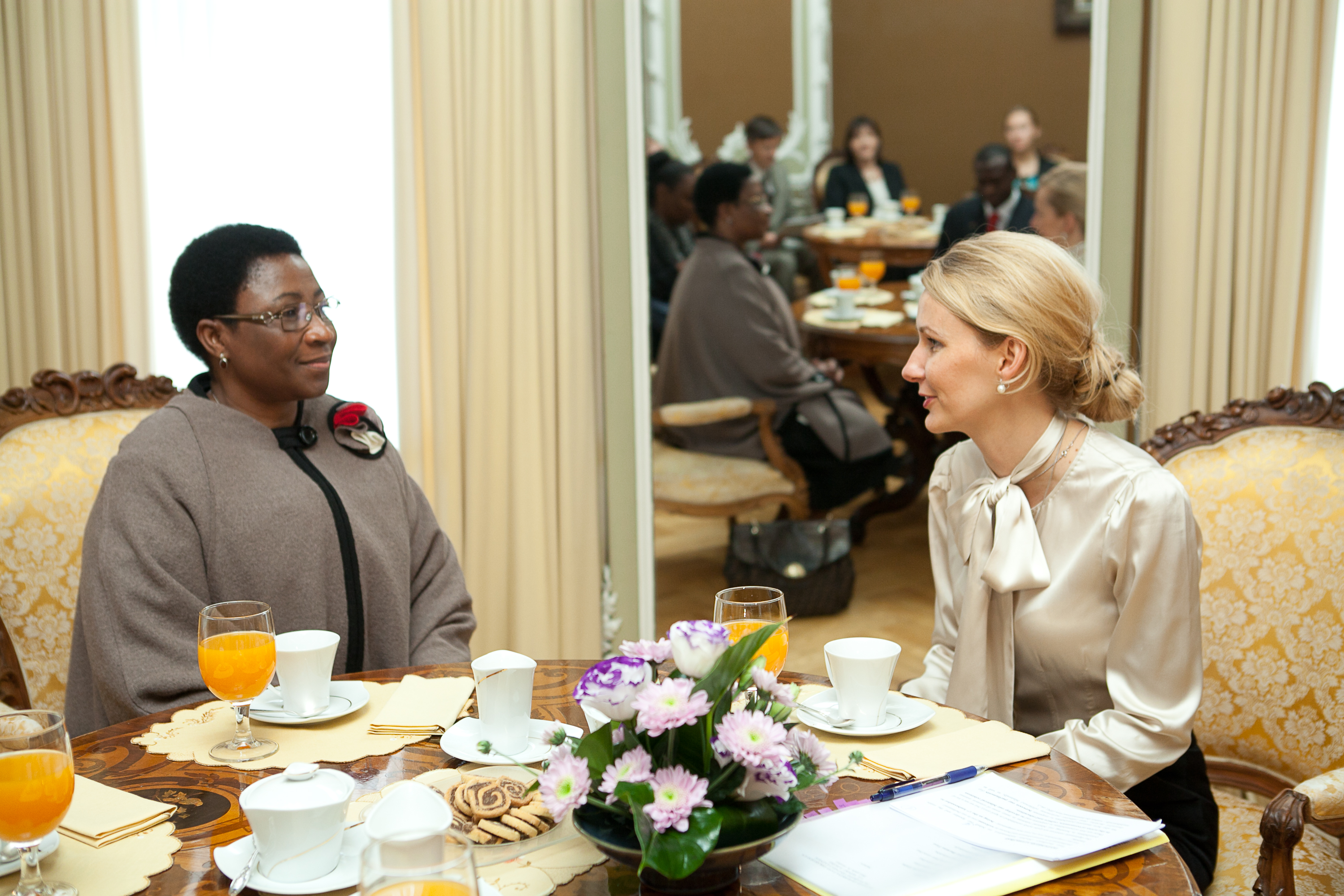
