= Anne-Laure Folly =

Togolese documentary filmmaker (born 1954)

- Born: March 31, 1954 (age 72); Togo
- Occupation: Filmmaker
- Awards: Silver Medal, Monte Carlo Television Festival, 1994 for Femmes aux yeux ouverts

Anne-Laure Folly (born March 31, 1954) is a documentary film maker from Togo.

== Work ==
In 1994, Folly won the silver medal at the Monte Carlo Television Festival for her documentary Femmes aux yeux ouverts (Women with eyes open). This film records women from Benin, Burkina Faso, Mali, and Senegal discussing their lives. The opening sequence of this film, her second, has a young woman staring into the camera and reciting the poem:

A good woman should obey her husband at all times,
A good woman should not know how to read,
A good woman's eyes should not be open.

The poem is by Monique Ilboudo of Burkina Faso, one of the women portrayed in the documentary. The film lets different women from Mali, Senegal, Burkina Faso and Benin talk about how they deal with the issues they are facing. Seven sections cover the subjects of clitoridectomy, forced marriage, HIV/AIDS, struggle, survival, economics and politics. It shows the paradox in which women have great responsibility for the survival and welfare of their families, but are given little voice in major decisions.

Folly's 1996 Les Oubliées (The forgotten women) is a documentary about Angola. After ten years of struggle for independence, the war in Angola had continued for another twenty years. The film explores the motives of the combatants, which were linked to the cold war, Cuban intervention and the racist South African regime. In this film, Folly again lets women tell their own stories. She shows the women from mid- or close-range, forcing the viewer to focus on their faces rather than their bodies or surroundings, and takes the time to let them say what they have to say, giving a unique women's perspective of the conflict. Folly participates in the film through her voice-over, giving a subjective element. She admits that she is not familiar with Angola, and certainly is not an authority.

Her film Sarah Maldoror ou la nostalgie de l'utopie (1998) is a tribute to Sarah Maldoror, who made the classic film Sambizanga (1972).

== Filmography ==
- 1992 Le Gardien des forces. Video, 52 min., documentary
- 1993 Femmes du Niger. Video, 26 min., documentary
- 1993 L'Or du Liptako. Video, 13 min.
- 1994 Femmes aux yeux ouverts. Video, 52 min., documentary
- 1995 Les Amazones se sont reconverties. Video, 13 min., documentary
- 1996 From the Tree to the Dugout/Entre l'arbe et la pirogue. 52 min., documentary
- 1997 Les Oubliées. 16mm, 52 min., documentary
- 1998 Sarah Maldoror ou la nostalgie de l'utopie. 16mm, 26 min., documentary
- 1999 Deposez les Lames. 25 min., documentary
