= Walking Forward =

2020 Namibian docuseries produced by Tim Huebschle

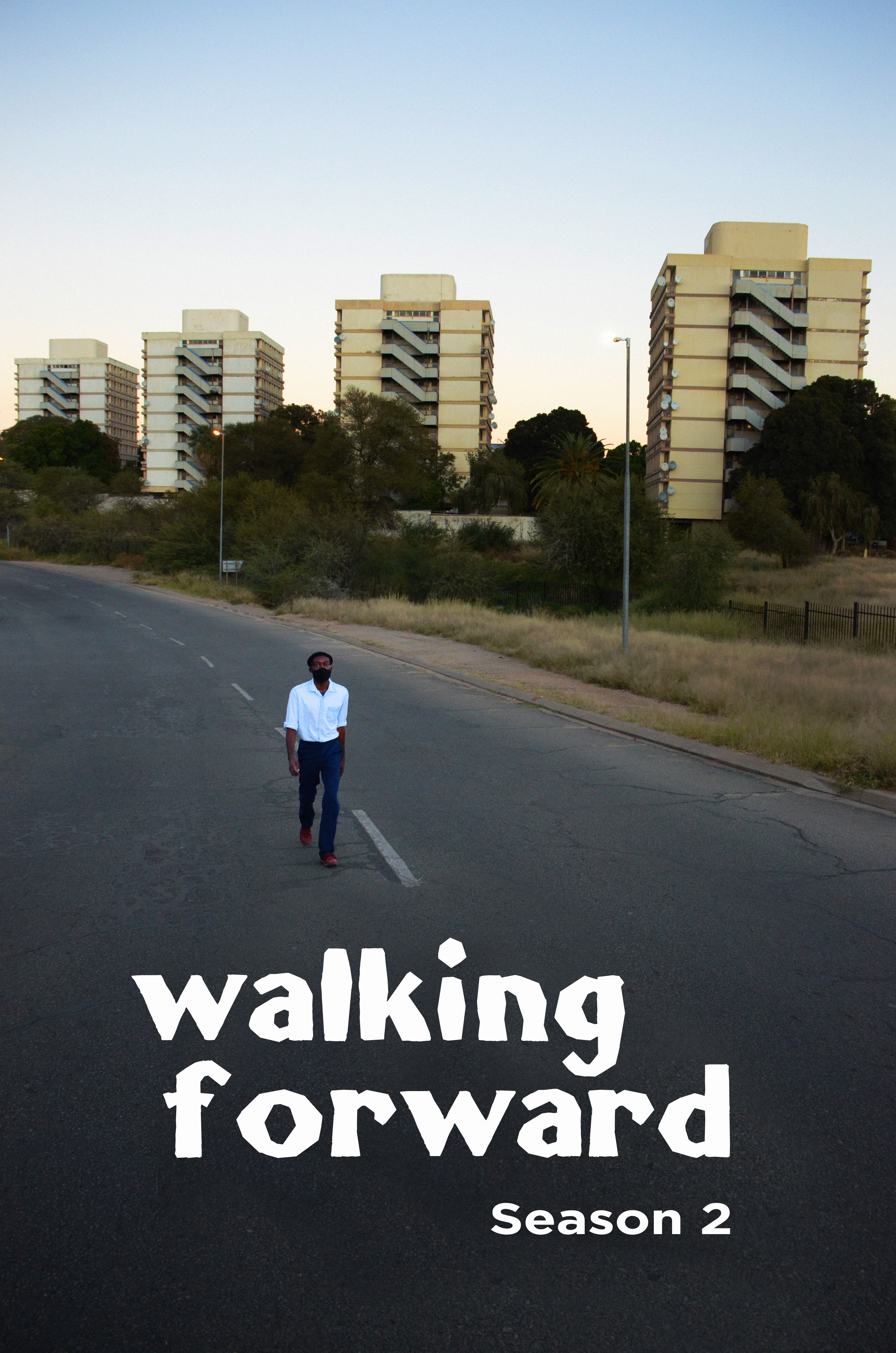
- Season 2 poster
- Genre: documentary
- Directed by: Tim Huebschle
- Presented by: Ndinomholo Ndilula
- Narrated by: Ndinomholo Ndilula
- Country of origin: Namibia
- Original language: English
- No. of episodes: 11

Production
- Producer: Tim Huebschle
- Cinematography: Antonius Tsuob
- Running time: 6 minutes
- Production company: Collective Productions Namibia

Original release
- Release: December 12, 2020

Walking Forward is a Namibian documentary web series produced and directed by Tim Huebschle. The first season premiered in December 2020 on YouTube. The second season aired in June 2021.

== Production ==
Walking Forward was shot in Windhoek in October 2020 and April 2021. The scripts were written by Ndinomholo Ndilula and Tim Huebschle. The interviewees were drawn from the various arts and cultural sectors in Season 1 and the healthcare sector in Season 2. The series was concluded with a last stand-alone episode entitled "So long, my friend." The episode was filmed in July 2022 and delves into the tourism sector after COVID-19 travel restrictions were lifted. It was filmed entirely at a lodge in the Namib and includes snippets from season 1 & 2.

== Cast ==
- Ndinomholo Ndilula (Interviewer / Artist & Creative Entrepreneur)
- Kulan Ganes (Casting Agent)
- Slick Upindi (Stand-up Comedian)
- Eva-Maria Manchen (Fashion Designer)
- Heino Manchen (Manufacturing)
- Leena Shipwata (Model)
- Galilei Njembo (Classical Music Student)
- Jackson Wahengo (Musician)
- Victoria Hailapa (Production Manager)
- Andy Diergaardt (Acting Director)
- Gina Figueira (Curator)
- Nikhita Winkler (Choreographer)
- Stanley Mareka (Dance Lecturer)
- Israel Iyambo (Paramedic)
- Justa de Klerk (Professional Nurse & Lecturer)
- Foibe Sakaria (Youth Leader)
- Michael Nauta (Mechanical Engineer)
- Dr. Kaveto Sikuvi (Emergency Medical Doctor)
- Ndumbu Pentikainen (Chief Medical Technologist)
- Ndahafa Frans (Technologist)
- Lize Ehlers (Musician)
- Adriano Visagie (Media Personality)
- Denver Kisting (Journalist)
- Lufina Kamoso (Kindergarten Principal)
- Jonathan Nangombe (Tourguide)
- Stephan Brückner (Managing Director)
- Cecilia Nghidengwa (Happiness Coordinator)
