= Dead River (film) =

2012 Namibian short film

- Directed by: Tim Huebschle
- Written by: Tim Huebschle
- Story by: Rolf Ackermann
- Produced by: Cecil Moller; Marinda Stein
- Cinematography: Frederik Füssel
- Edited by: Haiko Boldt
- Music by: Alessandro Alessandroni
- Production company: Collective Productions Namibia
- Distributed by: Collective Productions Namibia
- Release date: 12 July 2012
- Running time: 34 minutes
- Country: Namibia
- Language: English

Dead River, is a 2012 Namibian short drama history film directed by Tim Huebschle and co-produced by Cecil Moller and Marinda Stein. The film stars Christin Meinecke-Mareka and Jens Schneider in lead roles whereas Jade Coury, David Ndjavera and Hans-Christian Mahnke in supportive roles.

The film received critics positive acclaim and screened worldwide. The film received five awards and nominated for another eight awards.

== Cast ==
- Christin Meinecke-Mareka as Lisa von Dornstedt
- Jens Schneider as Adolf von Dornstedt
- Jade Coury as Young Lisa
- Erven Katiti as David (Teen)
- Hans-Christian Mahnke as Ex Husband
- David Ndjavera as David
- Shaquille Shikwambi as Young David
