= Odile Gertze =

Namibian beauty queen from Windhoek (born 1988)

- Born: Odile Madeline Gertze; 1988 (age 37–38); Windhoek, Namibia
- Occupations: Fashion journalist, Model, Actress, Radio Host
- Height: 1.69 m (5 ft 7 in)
- Beauty pageant titleholder
- Title: Miss Namibia 2010
- Hair color: Brown
- Major competitions: Miss Namibia 2010 (Winner); Miss World 2010 (Top 25)

Odile Madeline Gertze (born c. 1988) is a Namibian model and beauty pageant title holder. She was crowned Miss Namibia 2010 on July 31, 2010 and became one of the top 25 semifinalists in Miss World 2010.

== Early life ==
Gertze graduated from Elizabeth Galloway Fashion Academy in 2009, in South Africa, and while she was there, she took the opportunity to gain experience while working as a model during her studies.

She is currently working as a freelance journalist for The Namibian for their fashion section in The Weekender and previously worked on model work, such as Photography for Print Media, Model portfolio, Ramp/fashion shows, Meet & greet, Promotions and Fashion Shows.

== Miss World 2010 ==
As the official representative of her country to the 2010 Miss World pageant held in Sanya, China, Gertze became one of the Top 20 finalists during the Miss World Talent fast track event held on October 26, finishing her participation as one of the Top 25 semifinalists of Miss World 2010 on October 30.

== Acting ==
Odile acted in the 2014 feature film Katutura.

== Awards ==
In 2017, Odile won the Best Actress Award at the Namibia Theatre and Film Awards after featuring in the Katutura Film.

Awards and achievements
Preceded by Happie Ntelamo	Miss Namibia; 2010	Incumbent
