= Erna Chimu =

Namibian singer

- Born: 6 January 1974 (age 52); Ondekaremba farm
- Occupation: Musician
- Years active: 2009–present
- Notable work: Female Artist of Year 2014

Erna Chimu (born January 1974) is a Namibian jazz singer of jazz and songwriter. Erna grew up at Khorixas in Kunene Region, and Shemyetu ignited her passion for music. She rose to fame when she won several Namibian musical awards in 2014, including best instrumental jazz, best traditional song, and female artist of the year at the Namibia Annual Music Awards (NAMA).

== Music career ==
The music career of Chimu started in 2007, when she was one of the Namibian artists to appear at the 2008 Old Mutual Jazz Encounters in South Africa. She also participate in a similar concert in 2010. In 2009, Chimu released her first album, Imamakunguwe with which she won two awards: best Khoe-jazz in 2009 at the Ma/Gaisa Awards and best traditional song at the NAMAs 2010. In 2014, Chimu released her second album, Hai Serute. This album earned her the following awards: best instrumental jazz, best traditional song, and female artist of the year at the Namibia Annual Music Awards (NAMA). The third album of Erna Chimu was released in 2019 named Uprising that meant to be given a second chance and starting a new beginning after her illness and recovery. The album consisted of traditional jazz and township mbaqanga. Of recent the veteran musician Chimu released a new gospel single titled /Nororo which simply means wash away my signs.

Erna also performed in other concerts, such as those in Cameroon in 2013 at the Le Kolatier Music Festival; in 2015 at the United Kingdom at Leicester at the Night of Festivals; and in Sweden and Finland the same year. Throughout her career, she shared the stage with renowned South African artists such as Freshlyground, Vusi Mahlasela, Lira and Sipho Mabuse.

Erna Chimu also acted as Isola's mother in the film Katutura.

== Albums ==
- 2009: Imamakunguwe
- 2014: Hai Serute
- 2019: Uprising

== Awards ==
- 2009: Best Khoe-jazz(Ma/Gaisa Awards)
- 2010: Best traditional song (NAMAs)
- 2014: Best instrumental jazz
- 2014: Best traditional song
- 2014: Female artist of the year
