= Au rendez-vous du rêve abêti =

- Directed by: Kodjo Goncalves
- Release date: 1979
- Running time: 15 minutes
- Country: Togo

Au rendez-vous du rêve abêti is a Togolese documentary film directed by Kodjo Goncalves. It was released in 1979 and shot in 16mm. It runs for 15 minutes.
