= Welcome to the Smiling Coast: Living in the Gambian Ghetto =

2016 Hollan-Gambian documentary film

- Directed by: Bas Ackermann
- Written by: Bas Ackermann
- Produced by: Emiel Martens
- Starring: 15 Gambian youth
- Cinematography: Bas Ackermann; Danny Akker; Frits Marchand; Alhagie Manka
- Edited by: Bas Ackermann
- Production companies: Dudes in your Face; State of Mic; Stichting Caribbean Creativity; UpperUnder
- Release date: 11 February 2016; (United States)
- Running time: 72 minutes
- Country: Netherlands
- Language: English

Welcome to the Smiling Coast: Living in the Gambian Ghetto, is a 2016 Dutch-Gambian documentary film directed by Bas Ackermann and produced by Emiel Martens. The film revolves around 15 Gambian youngsters working in the Gambian tourism industry of sun, safari and sex where their daily struggles against the informal economy.

The film made its premier on 11 February 2016 at the Pan African Film Festival in United States. The film received positive reviews from critics. The film made official selection at many film festivals worldwide including: the Pan African Film Festival and AfricanBamba Human Rights Film Festival (African premier), Galway African Film Festival (European premier), The African Film Festival (TAFF), World Cinema Amsterdam, Amsterdam Lift-Off Festival Online, COMMFFEST (Global) Community Film Festival, Cine Pobre Film Festival, Lusaka Film & Music Festival, Evolution! Mallorca International Film Festival, Intimate Lens. Festival of Visual Ethnography, Festival International du Film PanAfricain de Cannes, Docs Without Borders Film Festival, Silver Lake Tour Film Festival (SILAFEST), and Campania Film Festival.

== Cast ==
- Abba – "Man-of-all-work"
- Abdul – "All-rounder"
- Alhagie – "Media producer"
- Amad – "Handyman"
- Andoullai – "Media producer"
- Aziz – "Reggae Artist"
- Fatima – "Fruit lady"
- Jahson – "Bumster"
- Jamela – "Soccer player"
- Kumba – "Lady of the night"
- Mousa – "Watchman"
- Muna – "TV host & director"
- Yancuba – "Kora player"
- Ebrima – "Student"
- Yusupha – "Student"
