= Land of the Brave =

2019 Namibian film

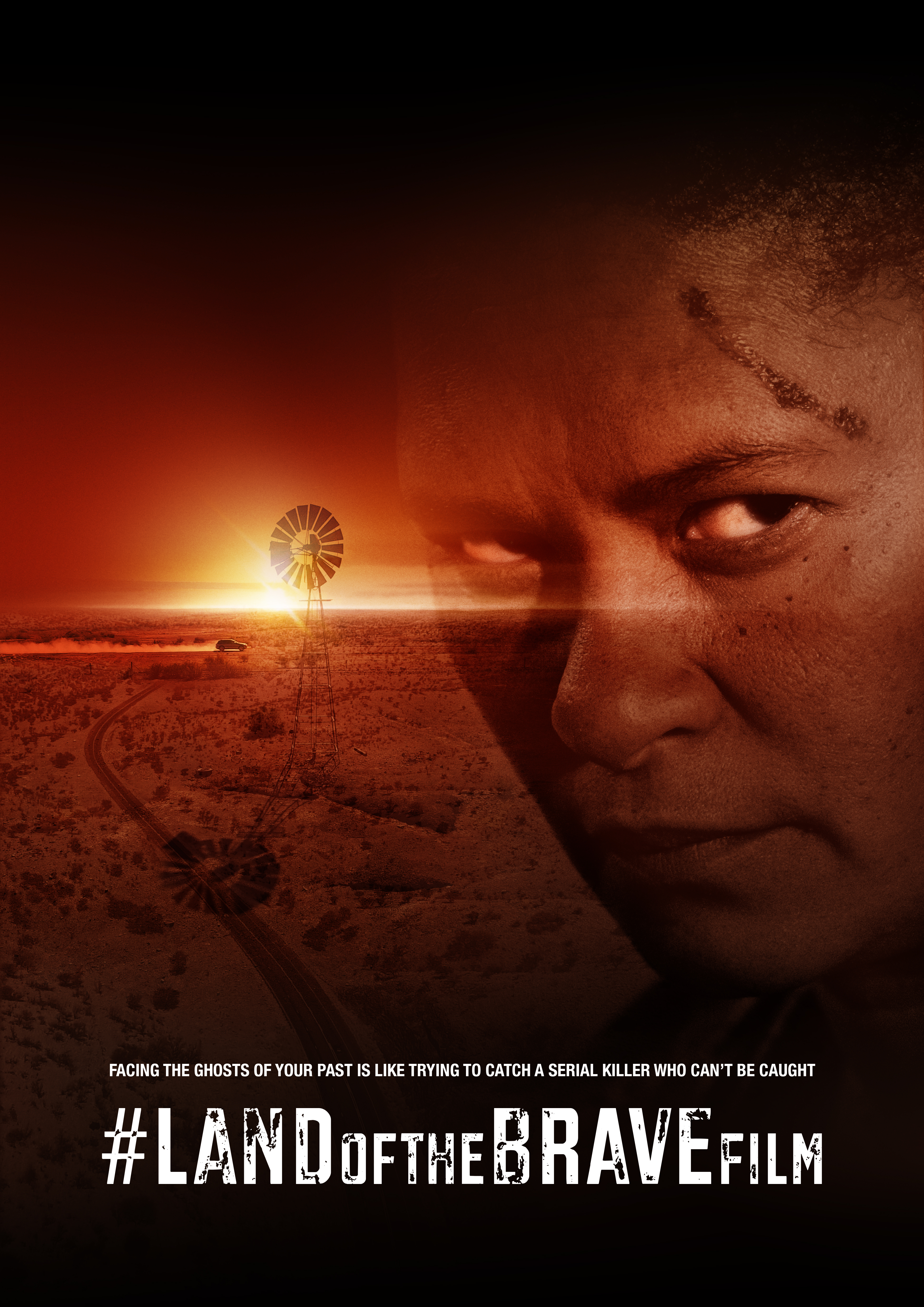
- Film poster
- Directed by: Tim Huebschle
- Screenplay by: Tim Huebschle
- Produced by: David Benade
- Starring: Elize de Wee; Armas Shivute; Pieter Greeff; Khadijah Mouton; Ralf Boll; Chantell Uiras
- Cinematography: Haiko Boldt
- Edited by: Haiko Boldt
- Music by: Ginge Anvik
- Production company: Collective Productions Namibia
- Release date: October 10, 2019
- Running time: 95 minutes
- Country: Namibia
- Languages: Afrikaans, English, Oshivambo

Land of the Brave (stylized as #LANDoftheBRAVEfilm) (also known as Terre des braves) is a Namibian feature film released in 2019, written and directed by Tim Huebschle.

== Plot ==
It follows Meisie Willemse, a tough cop with a successful career and a troubled past. Her dark secrets begin to surface as she works on one of the biggest murder cases of her career. The closer she gets to finding the killer, the more her past catches up with her, threatening to destroy everything.

== Cast ==
- Elize de Wee as Meisie Willemse
- Armas Shivute as Shivute
- Pieter Greeff as Piet Potgieter
- Ralf Boll as Dr. Franz Schneider
- Khadijah Mouton as Cherry
- Chantell Uiras as Charmaine
- Chridon Panizza as Suiker
- Felicity Celento as Maureen

== Production ==
Huebschle started developing the screenplay in 2009, loosely basing it on the story of the B1 Butcher, an unidentified serial killer in Namibia.

The Namibia Film Commission funded a portion of the production budget. Principal photography took place in July & August 2018.

== Release ==
#LANDoftheBRAVEfilm was launched in 2014 on social media as a transmedia project and premiered on the Namibian cinema circuit in October 2019. After the premiere in Namibia the film was screened at film festivals in Africa, Europe, Asia and North America.

In 2021 #LANDoftheBRAVEfilm was added to the library of the streamer Showmax. Since 2023 the French version of the film is available on Canal+ Afrique.

== Critical reception ==
The film received varied critical responses. The serial killer storyline was criticised for leaning heavily on Hollywood, setting itself apart only through the scenic landscapes in Namibia. The sparse production design was pointed out which limits the lived-in feel of the various interior film locations. The performance of the lead actress was considered unnatural, occasionally through her facial expressions and the consistent use of Namibian cusswords. On the other hand, the performance of Elize de Wee was praised for her accurate portrayal of a hardened cop and the storyline recognized for keeping the audience engaged throughout the duration of the film. The drone footage used for scene transitions throughout the film was considered tedious and the overall acting one-note. Despite these shortcomings the tight script and the gritty atmosphere made for a well constructed crime story with an atypical main character.

== Awards ==
The film won the following awards:

2020: Best Narrative Feature Award at Silicon Valley African Film Festival

2021: Best International Feature Film at Uganda Film Festival

2021: Best Actor Armas Shivute (Southern Africa) at Sotigui Awards

2021 : Best Actress (at Elize de Wee) at L'Afrique Fait Son Cinéma

2022: Best Soundtrack & Best Screenplay at International Police Award Arts Film Festival

2026: Best Sound & Music, Best Costume Design & Make-up, Best Editor at Namibian Theatre & Film Awards
