= Femmes aux yeux ouverts =

- Directed by: Anne-Laure Folly
- Narrated by: Anne-Laure Folly
- Release date: 1994
- Running time: 52 minutes
- Country: Togo
- Language: French with English subtitles

Femmes aux yeux ouverts (Women with eyes open) is a Togolese documentary film directed by Anne-Laure Folly. It covers the lives of contemporary African women in Burkina Faso, Mali, Senegal and Benin.

== Production ==
The film was released in 1994 and runs for 52 minutes in French with English subtitles. Folly said of it:

I simply wanted to show African women's ability to reach the end of the twentieth century and to enter the twenty-first century positively, that is, by articulating a set of problems, questions, and answers that contribute to world development. I wanted to show that they participate fully in the questions that concern all women.

== Description ==
This film records women from Benin, Burkina Faso, Mali, and Senegal discussing their lives. The opening sequence of this film, Folly's second, has a young woman staring into the camera and reciting the poem:

A good woman should obey her husband at all times,
A good woman should not know how to read,
A good woman's eyes should not be open.

The poem is recited by Monique Ilboudo of Burkina Faso, one of the women portrayed in the documentary. The film lets different women from Mali, Senegal, Burkina Faso and Benin talk about how they deal with the issues they are facing. Seven sections cover the subjects of clitoridectomy, forced marriage, HIV/AIDS, struggle, survival, economics and politics. It shows the paradox in which women have great responsibility for the survival and welfare of their families, but are given little voice in major decisions.

== Reception ==
The film won the Silver Medal at the 1994 Monte Carlo Television Festival. According to Kenneth W. Harrow, the film has a "rational substratum and structuring". The film tries to communicate a universally valid value system for women. Alice Walker said of the film:

It takes courage to see the true condition of women in the world and to speak out about it. Courage and a strong stomach. The women in this film possess the necessary radical vision that neither romanticizes nor renders remote the obvious consequences of female enslavement.
