= Guns for Sale =

Guns For Sale
- Directed by: Richard Alwyn
- Written by: Richard Alwyn & Sarah Errington
- Produced by: Sarah Errington
- Starring: Lokwarionga
- Narrated by: Andrew Sachs
- Release date: 1998
- Running time: 50 minutes
- Countries: Northern Uganda, Africa
- Languages: Ugandan, English

Guns for Sale is a 1998 documentary film about the effect of guns on manhood, raiding, and livelihood in Karamajong, northern Uganda.

== Synopsis ==
This film starts off with a brief introduction of the Karamajong people in Northern Uganda, Africa. They are one of the most feared tribes in all of Africa and are well known for their cattle herding and raiding. Traditions remain, but guns entered the fold and have become intertwined not only in Karamajong culture, but also the culture of neighboring tribes as well. The arms trade is responsible for this rise in guns from traditional sticks, spears, and bow & arrows; which has led to overwhelming brutality and violence all throughout Africa.

The film introduces Lokwarionga, a skilled warrior, commander, guardian, and feared raider who is part of the Karamajong ethnic people and has his fair share of violence. He has ten confirmed kills and holds much renown among his people. However, an aged Lokwarionga is introduced not a youthful one and his many wives and children have brought out a peaceful nature to him. He has seen the blood that spills with combat and has transitioned to a peaceful protector role. Violence plagues Uganda and the Ugandan government developed an initiative to recruit Karamajong warriors, including Lokwarionga, as vigilantes to bring peace to surrounding areas. These peace keepers essentially settle disputes and report back to the government.

An important conflict that opens this story up is a cattle raid on the Karamajong by a neighboring enemy, which causes Lokwarionga and other warriors to investigate and then contact the government. He meets with a Ugandan government official, but the official really just receives the report and tells them there is nothing that can really be done at that point. Simultaneously, Longora, younger brother of Lokwarionga, is presented in the film. Longora is not a warrior yet and does not own a firearm at this point. He is still learning the ropes and even raiding is fairly new to him. Juxtaposed to Lokwarionga, who is transitioning from that lifestyle, Longora is actively pursuing it. So, as a response to the cattle raid the Karamajong along with Lokwarionga plan to do a counter raid. First, they commence a raiding ceremony that has incorporated modern elements. The ceremony begins with the sacrifice of a cow. The cow is cut open and warriors must eat bits of the raw meat. Next, the warriors and their guns are smeared with the insides of the cow's intestines.

Finally, the raid comes to fruition and is ultimately successful. Longora, who was part of the raiding party, at this point shows his first real demonstration of manhood. Lokwarionga contradicts his new lifestyle when he presents his younger brother with a weapon. Although it seems necessary to have one in the type of environment these men were brought up in. The story comes to a close with violence and guns shown as pivotal to manhood.

== Cast ==
- Lokwarionga- a veteran commander, warrior, guardian, and raider in Karamajong
- Longora- younger brother of Lokwarionga, rookie raider, and warrior-in-training
- Naru- a female Karamajong, senior of Lokwarionga's wives
- Unnamed Karamajong man 1- describes violence and death that guns have brought
- Unnamed Karamajong wife of Lokwarionga 1- brief description of situation in Karamajong
- Unnamed Karamajong wife of Lokwarionga 2- talks about her husband Lokwarionga
- Unnamed Ugandan government official- reported to by Karamajong warriors, speaks English

== Production ==
This film was shot in Northern Uganda where the Karamajong ethnic group resides as well neighboring areas. Writer, Director, and Ethnographer Richard Alwyn and Writer, Ethnographer, and Producer Sarah Errington follow the real life events of Lokwarionga. The production centers around him and the geographic location where production took place was fairly focused. Most dialogue is translated, but Andrew Sachs, the narrator of this film, gives historical context and description of events to tie the film together.

== Release information ==
The film was released in 1998 with a plethora of documentaries that can be seen in Under the Sun, a doc-series, based out of London, England through BBC Worldwide.

== Reception ==
This film has yet to receive any reception through any mainstream media, but there were some scholarly articles by Ben Knighton. Knighton is a Co-ordinator of Africa Research Interest Group, Research Tutor, Oxford Centre for Mission Studies. In his three separate articles using this film as a reference he discussed the raider state and the threat of guns. Knighton even discusses how intertwined the gun has become with Karamajong culture.
