= Raimundo Bernabé Nnandong =

Equatoguinean director and actor

- Born: Raymundo Bernabé Nnandong Nchama Russo; 1991 (age 34–35); Equatorial Guinea
- Occupations: Director, Actor, Producer, Screenwriter
- Years active: 2008–present

Raymundo Bernabé Nnandong Nchama Russo (born 1991), is an Equatoguinean filmmaker, actor, producer, and screenwriter. He is best known for directing the award-winning 2020 documentary film Manoliño Nguema. He is also a member of the CEID board of directors in charge of Youth, Social Action and Communication.

== Personal life ==
He was born in 1991 in a small town in Equatorial Guinea. He later grew up in Bata, the capital.

== Career ==
In 2008, he started drama and theatre from the Spanish Cultural Centers in Bata and Malabo. He then joined the Ecuadorian and Guinean Cultural Center and the French Expression Institute (ICEF) to excel his artistic career. During his studies, he acted in many short films. Then in 2011, he co-directed the film Le Rendez-vous, La Cita (2011). His maiden cinema direction came in 2015 with the short film “Aricó Caliente.” He later won the Ceiba Award for the film as well. His best known and most awarded work is the short film “Aricó Caliente”, which was presented at the African Film Festival of Tarifa and Tangier (FCAT) in 2016.
