= Les Oubliées =

- Directed by: Anne-Laure Folly
- Narrated by: Anne-Laure Folly
- Cinematography: Arlette Girardo
- Edited by: Ondine Blanchard
- Production company: Amanou Production (France)
- Release date: 1996
- Running time: 53 minutes
- Country: Angola
- Languages: French and Portuguese with French subtitles

Les Oubliées (The forgotten women) is a 1996 documentary film directed by Anne-Laure Folly of Togo and shot in Angola.

== Production ==
The Portuguese-language film with French subtitles was released in 1996 and runs for 53 minutes. It takes the form of interviews with the women of Angola, including the daughter of Sarah Maldoror and Ruth Neto. Without running water, electricity or any way to communicate, they are normally mute.

== Description ==
The film is a documentary about Angola. It tells of the heavy cost of war to women. After ten years of struggle for independence, the war in Angola had continued for another twenty years. The film explores the motives of the combatants, including Cuba and South Africa's apartheid government. In this film, Folly lets women tell their own stories. She shows the women from mid- or close-range, forcing the viewer to focus on their faces rather than their bodies or surroundings, and takes the time to let them say what they have to say, giving a unique women's perspective of the conflict. Folly participates in the film through her voice-over, giving a subjective element. She admits that she is not familiar with Angola, and certainly is not an authority. The film thus becomes a record of Folly's own journey of discovery.
