= Assouma Adjiké =

Togolese filmmaker

- Born: Sanni Assouma Adjiké
- Occupations: Director, screenwriter
- Years active: 1990–present

Sanni Assouma Adjiké, is a Togolese filmmaker. She is notable as the director of the prizewinning short film Le Dilemme d'Eya.

== Career ==
In 1995, Assouma Adjiké directed two shorts: L'Eau sacree and Femmes Moba.

She made her short film Le Dilemme d'Eya in 2002. The film was produced by UNESCO and awarded two special jury prizes: Union Economique et Monétaire Ouest Africaine (UEMOA) and Plan International at the Panafrican Film and Television Festival of Ouagadougou (FESPACO). In May 2003, the film was selected for screening at the International Public Service Television Conference (INPUT).

== Filmography ==
Year	Film	Role	Genre	Ref.
1992	L'Eau potable d’Anazive	Director	Film	
1993	Le Savon de l’espoir	Director	Film	
1993	Vivre du poisson	Director	Documentary	
1995	L'Eau sacrée	Director	Short film	
1995	Femmes Moba	Director	Short film	
2002	Le Dilemme d'Eya	Director	Short film	
2006	Nyo Deal au Togo	Director	Short film	
2008	Déráyò Arúgbó	Screenwriter	Film	
