= Goldwidows: Women in Lesotho 1991 =

1991 Canadian-German documentary film

- Directed by: Don Edkins; Ute Holl; Mike Schlomer; Malibusong Matsoso; Thabo Nkubo
- Distributed by: First Run Icarus Films
- Release date: 1991 (Germany)
- Running time: 52 minutes
- Country: Canada
- Language: English

Goldwidows: Women in Lesotho 1991, is a 1991 Canadian-German documentary film co-directed by Don Edkins, Ute Holl, Mike Schlomer, Malibusong Matsoso and Thabo Nkubo. The film describes about four "Goldwidows", Basotho women from Lesotho whose husbands work as migrant gold miners in South Africa.

The film has been shot with interviews in Sesotho with English subtitles. The film made its premier in 1990 and distributed with VHS format. The film received mixed reviews from critics. The film made official selection to screen at Leipzig Film Festival and Melbourne Film Festival.
