= White Hotel (film) =

- Directed by: Dianne Griffin; Tobi Solvang
- Written by: Dianne Griffin
- Produced by: Dianne Griffin; Tobi Solvang
- Release date: 2004
- Country: United States
- Language: English

White Hotel is a documentary film produced by American filmmakers Dianne Griffin and Tobi Solvang. It was filmed in Eritrea in Eastern Africa and focuses on the issue of HIV/AIDS infection in Eritrea.

White Hotel was picked up for distribution by Jane Balfour Films in 2003. It was released on VHS in 2004.

== Plot ==
When two women with a video camera follow an American HIV research team to Eritrea, Africa, they are seduced by a land of joy, repression, sensuality, and sexual mutilation. White Hotel is the tourist residence where Griffin and Solvang begin their journey. Still, their journalistic objectivity is shattered by the circumstances they encounter, turning their documentary into an intimate investigation of their own capacities to love, suffer, and forgive.
