= Zinabu =

Ghanaian film

- Directed by: William Akuffor; Reichard Quartey
- Written by: William Akuffor
- Produced by: William Shakespeare Akuffor
- Production company: Worldwide Motion Pictures
- Release date: 1 October 1987
- Running time: 160 minutes
- Country: Ghana
- Language: English

Zinabu is a 1987 Ghanaian film directed by William Akuffo and Richard Quartey.

== Plot ==
Zinabu tells the story of a witch converting to Christianity.

== Production ==
The film was shot in 1985 using a video camera, rather than a film camera. Video was a relatively new medium at the time, but Akuffo recognised the advantage that video footage had over film, as film celluloid was more expensive and presented challenges for distribution. Zinabu became the first Ghanaian movie to be produced on video.

== Distribution ==
During the production of Zinabu, the Ghanaian government introduced a ban on video, in an attempt to curb the negative effect they thought unlicensed American and Chinese films were having on Ghanaian culture. This ban was lifted in 1987, largely due to the work of Akuffo.

The film received its premiere at the Globe Cinema. The screening was designed to imitate a normal film screening: the video player was not visible to the audience, and Akuffo was in the projection room.

== Legacy ==
Zinabu was the first Ghanaian video feature, beginning a new form of indigenous film production that would grow in the early 1990s. In 1988, two video films were released, but this grew to seven in 1991, and over 50 in 1993. Akuffo also produced three sequels to Zinabu.
