= Ashakara =

- French-language poster. The text means "The first African thriller: Scheming, Medicine, Multinationals."
- Directed by: Gérard Louvin
- Screenplay by: Gérard Louvin
- Story by: Philippe Souaille
- Starring: James Campbell; Jean-Marc Pasquet; Willy Monshengwo; Bamela Nyanta
- Cinematography: Yves Pouliquen
- Edited by: Nelly Meunier
- Music by: Louis Crelier
- Production companies: Diproci; Koulinga Productions; Ministère de la Culture du Togo; Télévision Suisse Romande
- Distributed by: Citel Films; La Société des Films Sirius; ArtMattan Productions
- Release dates: 31 August 1991 (VIFFF); 30 September 1992 (general release)
- Running time: 98 minutes
- Countries: Burkina Faso; Togo; Switzerland; France
- Language: French

Ashakara is a French-Swiss produced Burkinabé-Togolese dark comedy film directed by Gérard Louvin, starring James Campbell, Jean-Marc Pasquet, Willy Monshengwo and Bamela Nyanta. It was released in 1991 and entered into the 1992 Cognac International Film Festival, Solothurn Film Festival, Pan African Film Festival and Vevey International Funny Film Festival.

== Plot ==
A traditional African remedy is discovered to be effective against a deadly virus, but a multinational pharmaceutical company does not want it to succeed.
