= Katutura (film) =

- Directed by: Florian Schott
- Written by: Obed Emvula; Florian Schott
- Produced by: Obed Emvula; Florian Schott; Ed Ehrenberg; Mutaleni Nadimi
- Starring: Mara Baumgartner; Obed Emvula; Whilzahn Gelderbloem; Tjuna Kauapirura; Odile Müller; Kandi Shejavali; Jacobs Shivute; Chops Tshoopara; Gift Uzera
- Edited by: Haiko Boldt
- Music by: Sonja Majewski
- Release date: 5 October 2015 (Namibia)
- Running time: 114 minutes
- Country: Namibia
- Language: English

Katutura is a 2015 Namibian action/drama film directed by Florian Schott about the hard life in Katutura, a township in Windhoek, the capital city of Namibia.

== Synopsis ==
Katutura follows a group of characters as they experience the gravity of living in a township. Ex-convict Dangi has to deal with living a law-abiding life, an extramarital son, and an old flame whom his wife doesn't know about. Gangster Shivago explores a new market to sell his drugs, and Kondja, a teenager in a wheelchair who helps street kids, falls in love for the first time. Their paths intertwine and their lives collide in both hopeful and brutal ways.

Katutura deals with the struggle of everyday life in the township. There is crime, drug abuse, violence, but it also shows the strength of the community as well as the bustling creativity in the place otherwise known as the place where we do not belong.

== Festivals ==
2016

- Pan African Film Festival
- Helsinki African Film Festival – Finland
- Écrans Noirs Film Festival – Cameroon
- African Film Festival Trinidad and Tobago

== Crew ==
The film brought together a talented and diverse creative crew to make it a success. These are:

- Director : Florian Schott
- Producer : Obed Emvula
- Writers: Florian Schott, Obed Emvula
- Editor: Haiko Boldt
- Cinematography : Trevor A. Brown
- Production Design : Bobby Cardoso
- Composer: Sonja Majewski

== Cast ==
- Elizabeth: Mara Baumgartner
- Shivago: Obed Emvula
- Nancy: Whilzahn Gelderbloem
- Foibe: Tjuna Kauapirura
- Esme (as Odile Mueller): Odile Müller
- Ndapewa: Kandi Shejavali
- Gary: Jacobs Shivute
- Dangi: Chops Tshoopara
- Kondja: Gift Uzera
- Mouton: Armas Shivute
- Isola: Prisca Anyolo
- Companheiro : Jericho Gawanab
- Kondja's Sister 1: Tumi Angela Phatela
- Kondja's Sister 2 : Dineo Elizabeth Phatela
- Pele: Paulus Alugongo
- Shivago's Gangster 1 : George Matroos
- Shivago's Gangster 2 : Clarence Geingob
- Shivago's Gangster 3 : Ryno “Playshis The Poet” Platt
- Titus : Nambuli Nashandi
- Redemption : Shane Smith
- Music Producer : Jacques Mushaandja
- Pharmacist: Christopher J Grant
- Teenage girl : Rochelle Besser
- Watch buyer : West Uarije
- Teacher : Isola Emvula
- O'Brien : Nashawn Jorge Shigwedha
- O'Brien's Gangster 1 : John Magongo
- O'Brien's Gangster 2: Tobias Naushanga
- O'Brien's Gangster 3: Mabuzza
- Isola's Mother : Erna Chimu
- Helping Neighbor : Khama Nakaduungile
- Police Officer : Lynn Strydom
- Pastor : Bonnie Pereko
