= The Blooms of Banjeli =

- Directed by: Carolyn Saltman
- Release date: 1986
- Country: Togo

The Blooms of Banjeli is a Togolese short documentary film directed by Carlyn Saltman. The 29-minute film includes footage from 1914 not released until 1986 or 1987. It documents the town of Banjeli, from its iron smelting technology to local rituals and sexual prohibitions.
