= Kouami =

- Directed by: Metonou Do Kokou
- Release date: 1972
- Running time: 30 minute
- Country: Togo

Kouami is a Togolese film directed by Metonou Do Kokou. It was released in 1972. The 30 minute film was shot in 16mm.
