= Florian Schott =

German-born filmmaker (born 1982)

Florian Schott (born 16 March 1982) is a German-born filmmaker based in Namibia since 2009. He began his career in 2002 as a First Assistant Director and has since worked on films in Antarctica, Europe, Africa, and South America.

== Career ==
Florian wrote, produced, and directed Everything Happens for a Reason, which took home the Best Director prize at the 2014 Namibian Theatre & Film Awards in addition to winning the Afrinolly Short Film Competition in Nigeria. In 2015, Florian also directed and co-wrote the Katutura film.

Baxu and the Giants, a short film that Florian co-wrote and directed in 2019, took home several international honors, including Best Foreign Narrative from the San Francisco Independent Short Film Festival and Best Director from the 2020 Dreamanila International Film Festival. It also became Netflix's first Namibian movie.

Florian is also a television director, having directed a few episodes of popular crime shows on German TV. He is developing two feature films as well as a short-lived African television series.

== Awards ==
In addition to playing in several foreign film festivals, Florian won seven awards at the 2017 Namibian Theatre & Film Awards, including Best Director and Best Narrative Picture.
