= Sahara Occidental indépendance ou génocide? =

1976 Documentary film

- Directed by: Bruno Muel; Théo Robichet; Miguel Ibarrondo
- Produced by: Unicité
- Edited by: Nedjma Scialom; Hamid Djellouli
- Release date: 3 December 1976; (France)
- Running time: 26 minutes
- Countries: Western Sahara; France
- Language: French

Sahara Occidental indépendance ou génocide? (Western Sahara, independence or genocide?), is a 1976 Western Saharan documentary film co-directed by Bruno Muel, Théo Robichet, and Miguel Ibarrondo. The film is produced by Théo Robichet for Unicité. The film explains the struggle of the Saharawi people and Polisario Front for the independence of Western Sahara and the guerrilla war against the Moroccans.

The film crew traveled the north-east of Western Sahara, and collected the recent traces of Moroccan abuses and the remains needed for the film. The film made its premier on 3 December 1976 in France. The film received positive reviews from critics.
