= Bawina =

- Directed by: Minza Bataba
- Release date: 1988
- Running time: 27 minutes
- Country: Togo

Bawina is a Togolese short film directed by Minza Bataba. It was released in 1988 and lasts for 27 minutes. The film centres on an engineer in a rural village.
