= Sambizanga (film) =

1972 film by Sarah Maldoror

- Directed by: Sarah Maldoror
- Screenplay by: Mário Pinto de Andrade; Maurice Pons; Sarah Maldoror
- Based on: A vida verdadeira de Domingos Xavier by José Luandino Vieira
- Starring: Domingos de Oliveira; Elisa Andrade
- Cinematography: Claude Agostini
- Edited by: George Klotz
- Production company: Isabelle Films
- Distributed by: New Yorker Films (United States); Animatógrafo (Portugal)
- Release date: October 19, 1972 (Portugal)
- Running time: 97 minutes
- Countries: Portuguese Angola; France; People's Republic of the Congo
- Languages: Portuguese; Kimbundu; Lingala

Sambizanga is a 1972 film directed by Sarah Maldoror and written by Maldoror, Mário Pinto de Andrade, and Maurice Pons, based on the 1961 novella The Real Life of Domingos Xavier by José Luandino Vieira. Set in 1961 during the onset of the Angolan War of Independence, it follows the struggles of Angolan militants involved with the Popular Movement for the Liberation of Angola (MPLA), an anti-colonial political movement. Maldoror co-wrote the screenplay with her husband, who was a leader within the MPLA. Sambizanga was the first feature film produced in Angola and by any Lusophone African country. Maldoror was the first woman in Africa to direct a feature film.

== Plot ==
The film takes place partly in Sambizanga, a working-class neighbourhood in Luanda that housed a Portuguese prison where many Angolan anti-colonial militants were tortured and killed. On February 4, 1961, MPLA forces attacked the prison.

Domingos Xavier, a revolutionary, is arrested by colonial authorities and taken to the prison, where he faces threats of torture unless he discloses the names of his fellow activists. Meanwhile, his wife, Maria, unaware of his involvement in the anti-colonial struggle, searches from prison to prison, trying to find him. While she continues her search, Domingos dies from injuries sustained during interrogation.

== Cast ==
- Domingos de Oliveira as Domingos Xavier
- Elisa Andrade as Maria
- Jean M'Vondo as Petelo
- Dino Abelino as Zito
- Benoît Moutsila as Chico
- Talagongo as Miguel
- Lopes Rodrigues as Mussunda
- Henriette Meya as Bebiana
- Manuel Videira as the PIDE agent
- Ana Wilson as the narrator

== Production ==
Sambizanga was based on a 1961 novella by José Luandino Vieira, a white Angolan writer born in Portugal who had served a 11-year prison sentence for his work in the anti-colonial struggle in Angola.

Sambizanga was shot on location in the People's Republic of the Congo over a seven-week period.

Many of the actors in the film were non-professionals who were involved in African anti-colonial movements such as the MPLA and the African Party for the Independence of Guinea and Cape Verde (PAIGC). Domingos de Oliveira, who played Domingos Xavier, was an Angolan exile living in the Congo; while Maria was played by Elisa Andrade, an economist from Cape Verde.

== Release and reception ==
Sambizanga was released in Portugal on 19 October 1974 following the Carnation Revolution and was also released in Angola the same year following its independence.

Writing in The Village Voice, Michael Kerbel compared Sambizanga to Soviet Russian filmmaker Sergei Eisenstein's 1925 film Battleship Potemkin in terms of its political significance. Writing in 2012 for The Guardian, Mark Cousins named the film as one of the ten best African films, describing it "as bold, as well-lit as Caravaggio paintings".

Nwachukwu Frank Ukadike praised Sambizanga for its feminist themes, writing that it "gives female subjectivity special attention, as it pertains to revolutionary struggles... the feminist aspect of the film becomes apparent... as it is aimed at giving credibility to women's participation".

Maldoror won the Tanit d'Or at the 1972 Carthage Film Festival. Sambizanga also screened at the 1973 Berlin International Film Festival.

In 2021, Sambizanga was restored by the African Film Heritage Project, an initiative created by the Film Foundation's World Cinema Project, the Pan-African Federation of Filmmakers, and UNESCO, with the blessing of Maldoror's family.
