= Sarah Maldoror =

French film director (1929–2020)

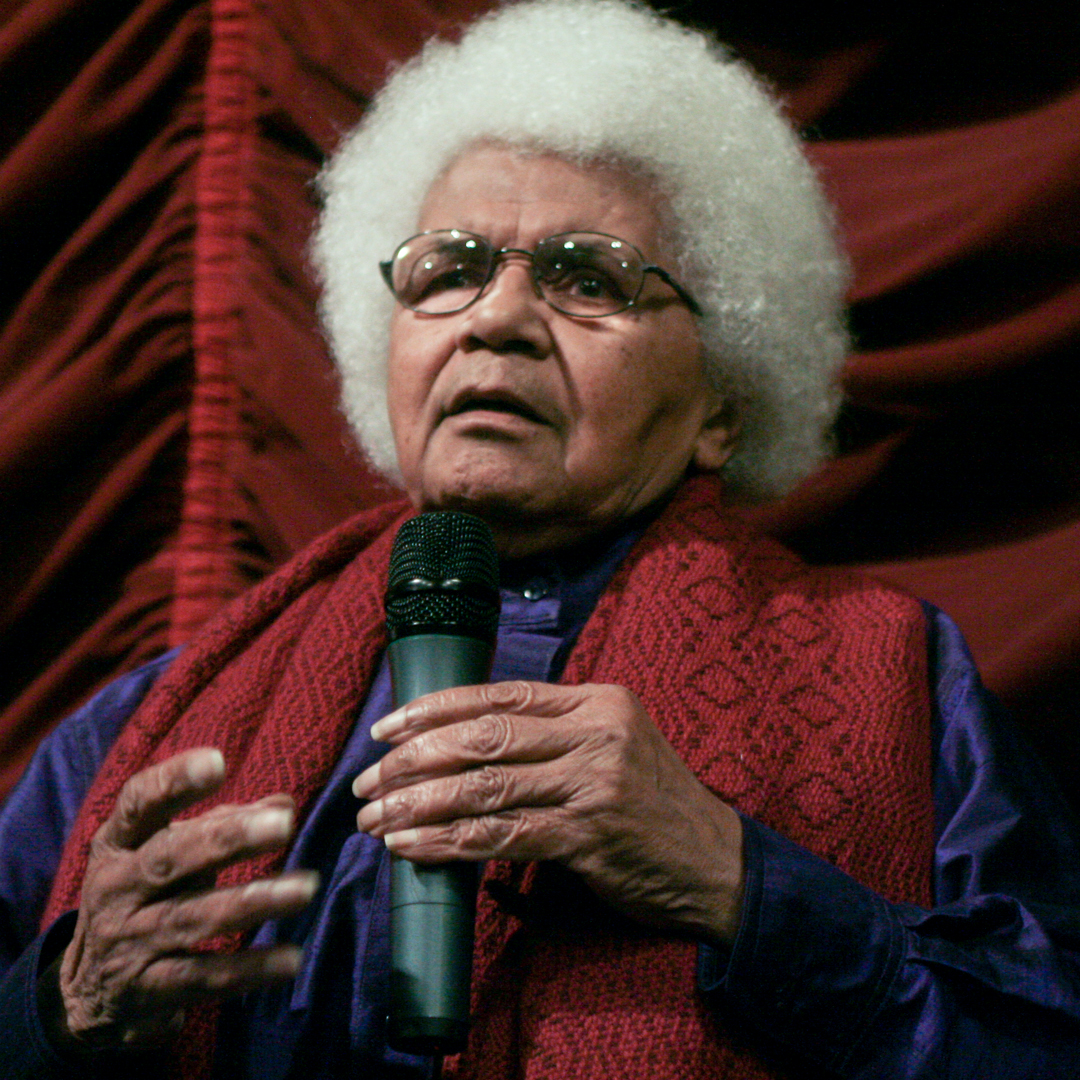
- Born: Sarah Ducados; 19 July 1929; Condom, France
- Died: 13 April 2020 (aged 90); Fontenay-lès-Briis, France
- Occupations: Film director, writer
- Notable work: Sambizanga (1972)
- Spouse: Mário Pinto de Andrade
- Children: two daughters
- Website: https://sarahmaldoror.org/

Sarah Maldoror (19 July 1929 − 13 April 2020) was a French filmmaker of European and Guadeloupean descent. She is best known for her feature film Sambizanga (1972) on the 1961–1974 war in Angola.

== Early life and education ==
Born Sarah Ducados in 1929 in Condom, Gers, in Southwest France, she was one of four children in her family. Her father was a black Frenchman from Guadeloupe. After his death when Sarah was young, her widowed mother struggled to support their family with her work as a maid. At times young Sarah was placed in an orphanage for care.

== Move to Paris ==
By the 1950s Ducados had moved to Paris, where she became involved in artistic circles. While studying drama, she and a group of other black students formed a theatre company called Les Griots. They gave readings of Césaire and produced Huis Clos, by Jean-Paul Sartre, as well as such playwrights as Pushkin and Synge.

Paris was also a center for activists for African independence. In this period Ducados chose her artist's surname from Les Chants de Maldoror by Lautréamont (the pseudonym of Isidore Ducasse, a French-Uruguayan poet).

About 1956 she met poet and Angolan nationalist Mário Pinto de Andrade, who had studied in Lisbon. They married and became "partners for life."

In 1958 Maldoror persuaded Jean Genet to give Les Griots first rights to perform his new play, Les Negres, to be directed Roger Blin, actor and theater director. Her coup captured the attention of intellectuals and artists. When the production opened in 1959, Le Monde described it as an "exciting work of the season."

Maldoror and Andrade together focused their activism in Africa. They were invited to Guinea-Conakry by its new leader, Sekou Touré, who had helped it gain independence. Andrade increased his political activism, becoming a founder of the Movimento Popular de Libertacao de Angola and its first president.

Maldoror had explored Surrealist verse in Paris and was intrigued by the connections between its practitioners and French communists. In Guinea, she was given a scholarship to study film at the Gerasimov Institute of Cinematography (also known as the Maxim Gorky Institute in Moscow). She worked with Mark Donskoi in 1961–62. During this period she also met Ousmane Sembène, a notable Senegalese author who became known as the "father" of modern African cinema.

Sarah and Mário had two daughters, Annouchka de Andrade, born in Moscow in 1962, and Henda Ducados Pinto de Andrade.

== Film career ==
After her studies, Maldoror with Andrade and their daughter lived in Morocco for a period, where their second daughter Henda was born in 1964.

In 1964, the family went to Algiers, described as the "new anti-imperialist metropole of the Third World" since Algeria's independence in 1962. Here Maldoror worked as an assistant on Gillo Pontecorvo's acclaimed film, The Battle of Algiers (1966), set during the nation's separation from France. She also worked as an assistant to Algerian director Ahmed Lallem on his film Elles (1966), a documentary about young Algerian women and their views of the future. She was a go-between the male directors and women subjects they wanted to film in this traditional society. These were her first projects in film.

Maldoror set her debut short film, Monangambée (1968), in Angola. It is based on a story by Angolan writer José Luandino Vieira. The title of this 17-minute film, Monangambée, refers to the call used by Angolan anti-colonial activists to signal a village meeting. The film was shot with amateur actors in Algeria.

Her first feature film, Sambizanga (1972), was also based on a story by Vieira (A vida verdadeira de Domingos Xavier). It is set in 1961 at the onset of the Angolan War of Independence. Maldoror filmed this in Francophone Congo-Brazzaville, as it would have been impossible for her to get permission in Angola.

It explores the lives of various peoples at the time: villagers, many of whose men work on major public projects by the Portuguese; African police and militia working for the Portuguese; networks of resistance among Angolans in the villages and cities, and the struggles of women. It features a poor married woman whose husband Domingos Xavier is arrested and taken away by Portuguese police, and her persistent efforts to find him in the city of Luanda, which had several kinds of prisons. He is tortured under interrogation and dies before she can reach him. The film was selected to represent Angola for the Director's Fortnight at the Cannes Film Festival in 1971.

== Reception ==
The Guardian film writer Mark Cousins included Sambizanga in a 2012 list of the ten best African films, saying it was "as bold, as well-lit as Caravaggio paintings".

Maldoror is one of the first women to direct a feature film in Africa. Her subjects were women at the time of the independence movements, and her work is often included in studies of the role of African women in African cinema.

She returned to France, completing numerous commercial as well as personal projects and films. Many of her early films have been lost.

Maldoror died on 13 April 2020, at the age of 90, from COVID-19 complications during the COVID-19 pandemic in France.

== Awards ==
- A Tanit d'or at the 1972 Carthage Film Festival
- Maldoror received the National Order of Merit (France) in 2011 from the Government of France

== Legacy ==
- Sambizanga (1972), considered her masterpiece, is included in the Criterion Collection, with two accompanying commentaries, including a short one by American director Martin Scorsese.
- Together with Monangambé (1968) and L'hôpital de Leningrad/The Leningrad Hospital (1982), Sambizanga was featured in an evening of screenings by the London Review of Books at The Garden Cinema, on 8 June 2024, in London.
- L'hôpital de Leningrad, (1982) commissioned by France 2TV, set in the Soviet Union in the 1930s; based on a story by Victor Serge

== Filmography ==
- Monangambé, 1968
- Des fusils pour Banta (Guns for Banta), 1970
- Carnaval en Guinée-Bissau (Carnival in Guinea-Bissau), 1971
- Sambizanga, 1972
- Un carneval dans le Sahel (Carnival in Sahel), 1977
- Folgo, Ile de Feu
- Et les chiens se taisaient (And the dogs kept silent)
- Un homme, une terre (A man, a country)
- La Basilique de Saint-Denis
- Un dessert pour Constance, 1981
- Le cimetière du Père Lachaise
- Miro
- Lauren
- Robert Lapoujade, peintre
- Toto Bissainthe, Chanteuse
- René Depestre, poète
- L'hôpital de Leningrad, (1982) commissioned by France 2TV, set in the Soviet Union in the 1930s; based on a story by Victor Serge
- La littérature tunisienne de la Bibliothèque nationale
- Un sénégalias en Normandie
- Robert Doisneau, photographe
- Le racisme au quotidien (Everyday racism), 1983
- Le passager du Tassili (The Tassili passenger), 1987
- Aimé Césaire, le masque des mots (Aimé Césaire, the mask of words), 1986
- Emmanuel Ungaro, couturier
- Louis Aragon – Un masque à Paris
- Vlady, peintre
- Léon G. Damas, 1995
- L'enfant-cinéma, 1997
- La tribu du bois de l'é (In the time of people)

== Documentary about Sarah Maldoror ==
- Sarah Maldoror ou la nostalgie de l’utopie by Anne Laure Folly, France /Togo, 1998.

== See also ==
- Women's Cinema
