= Angolans in Namibia =

Regions with significant populations
- Northeastern Namibia, especially along the Okavango River

Languages
- Portuguese, Oshiwambo

There are various communities of Angolans in Namibia.

== Migration history ==
As Angola and Namibia are neighbours, there has historically been a great deal of cross-border movements between the two countries. There were formerly large numbers of immigrants from southeast Angola at Mangarangandja and Sarasungu, east of Rundu along the Okavango River; however, they were relocated to Kaisosi and Kehemu in the 1970s. These early migrants tend to identify themselves as "Nyemba". Many early migrants were of Ovambo ethnicity, an ethnic group found on both sides of the border.

In 1989, as Namibia prepared to form a new independent government and Namibians in self-imposed exile in Angola returned to their homeland, hundreds of Angolans, including Angolans of Portuguese descent, came along with them, fleeing renewed fighting in the Angolan Civil War. The number of Angolan refugees had grown to 2,069 by 1996 and to 7,612 by 1999. Roughly 2,300 of those lived at Kahenge in the border area, with another 5,000 at Osire near Otjiwarongo in central Namibia. Efforts that year by the Namibian government to move newly-arriving refugees away from the border area to Osire camps were not well received; new arrivals preferred to remain in areas where they had familial and ethnic ties, despite the danger of attack from Angola and the poor facilities in the camp at Kahenge. At the peak in 2001, statistics of the United Nations High Commissioner for Refugees (UNHCR) showed 30,881 Angolan refugees in the country. Between January and July 2004, 7,035 Angolans who had taken refuge in Namibia during the Angolan Civil War had returned to Angola; the UNHCR aimed to repatriate a total of 14,000 that year. By 2005, the number of Angolan refugees remaining in the country had dropped sharply to 4,666 people.

Though even during the period of conflict, the border remained fairly permeable, the return of peace saw an increase in border crossings. Between 1999 and 2003, the number of foreign citizens arriving from Angola at the Oshikango border post nearly doubled from 143,992 to 267,504. The flow of Angolans into Namibia is much larger than the reverse flow of Namibians into Angola. Most cross the border on business or for visiting family members for short-term trips; only about 9% of these border-crossers stay in Namibia longer than six months. Some young labour migrants also cross the border from Angola into Namibia for temporary or seasonal work, especially on Namibian farms.

== See also ==
- Angola–Namibia relations
