= Vues d'Afrique =

Vues d'Afrique is an annual film festival in Montreal, Quebec. It is devoted primarily to African film, although it also includes some Canadian films about African Canadian culture.

The event was staged for the first time in 1985, originally under the name African Cinema Week, and was known as Vues d'Afrique by the early 1990s.

The festival's primary venue is the Cinémathèque québécoise, although films have also been screened at a variety of venues in the city including Concordia University, the Université du Québec à Montréal, the offices of the National Film Board, the Maison de la Culture Frontenac, and the Centre Pierre Péladeau. The festival has also sometimes organized film screenings in other cities outside Montreal, including Quebec City, Sherbrooke, Alma, Jonquière and Ottawa.

The festival screens both film and television projects. It also highlights other expressions of African culture, including an African food fair and events devoted to African dance, music, art and literature.

Due to the COVID-19 pandemic in Canada, the 2020 event was staged online through the website of TV5 Québec Canada.
