= Demographics of Namibia =

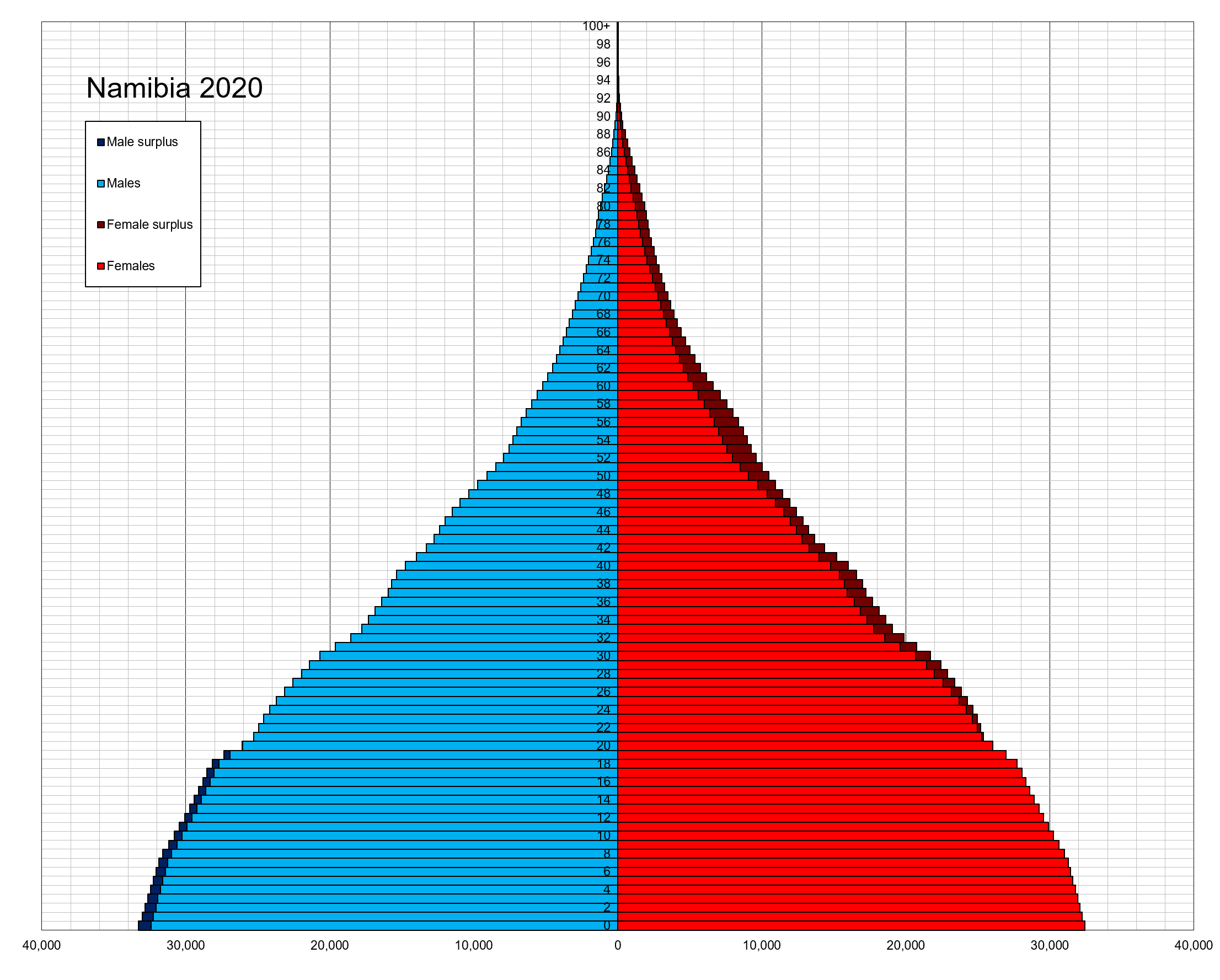
- Population pyramid of Namibia in 2020
- Population: 3,068,549 (2025 est.)
- Growth rate: 1.82% (2022 est.)
- Birth rate: 25.01 births/1,000 population (2022 est.)
- Death rate: 6.85 deaths/1,000 population (2022 est.)
- Life expectancy: 66.47 years
  - male: 64.46 years
  - female: 68.53 years
- Fertility rate: 2.98 children born/woman (2022 est.)
- Infant mortality: 29.42 deaths/1,000 live births
- Net migration rate: 0 migrant(s)/1,000 population (2022 est.)

Age structure
- 0–14 years: 35.68%
- 65 and over: 3.9%

Nationality
- Nationality: Namibian

This is a demography of the population of Namibia including population density, ethnicity, education level, health of the populace, economic status, religious affiliations and other aspects of the population.

== Population ==
Demographics of Namibia, Data of FAO, year 2005; Number of inhabitants in thousands.

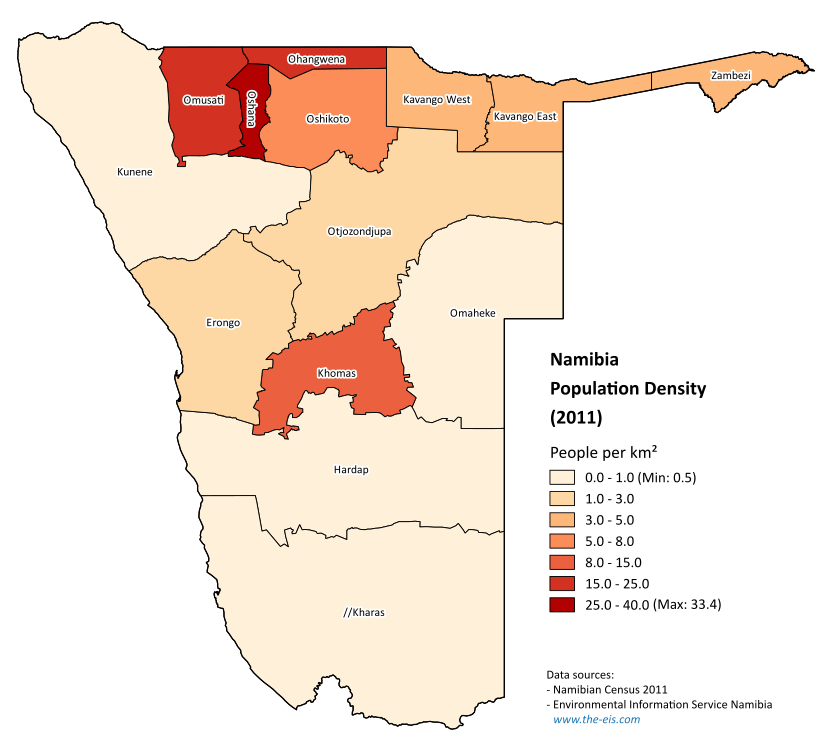
Population density in Namibia by regions (census 2011)

=== Census results ===
Historical population
Year	Pop.	±% p.a.
1921	228,916	—
1936	320,457	+2.27%
1946	362,464	+1.24%
1951	439,081	+3.91%
1970	761,010	+2.94%
1981	1,033,196	+2.82%
1991	1,409,915	+3.16%
2001	1,830,330	+2.64%
2011	2,113,077	+1.45%
2023	3,022,401	+3.03%

As required by the Namibian Statistics Act #66 of 1976, and in accordance with United Nations recommendations, a census is conducted every ten years. After Namibian independence the first Population and Housing Census was carried out in 1991, further rounds followed in 2001 and 2011. The data collection method is to count every person resident in Namibia wherever they happen to be. This is called the de facto method. For enumeration purposes the country is demarcated into 4,042 enumeration areas. These areas overlap with constituency boundaries in order to get reliable data for election purposes as well.

The 2011 Population and Housing Census counted 2,113,077 inhabitants of Namibia. Between 2001 and 2011 the annual population growth was 1.4%, down from 2.6% in the previous ten–year period.

In 2011 the total fertility rate was 3.6 children per woman, down from 4.1 in 2001.

=== UN estimates ===
According to the 2022 revision of the World Population Prospects the total population was 2,530,151 in 2021, compared to only 485 000 in 1950. The proportion of children below the age of 15 in 2010 was 36.4%, 59.9% was between 15 and 65 years of age, while 3.7% was 65 years or older.

	Total population	Population aged 0–14 (%)	Population aged 15–64 (%)	Population aged 65+ (%)
1950	485 000	38.8	57.1	4.1
1955	538 000	40.5	55.6	4.0
1960	603 000	41.6	54.7	3.7
1965	683 000	42.5	53.9	3.6
1970	780 000	43.1	53.3	3.6
1975	906 000	44.3	52.2	3.5
1980	1 013 000	46.6	49.9	3.5
1985	1 150 000	47.0	49.5	3.5
1990	1 415 000	43.7	53	3.4
1995	1 651 000	42	54.6	3.4
2000	1 896 000	40.3	56.3	3.4
2005	2 080 000	38.9	57.6	3.4
2010	2 283 000	36.4	59.9	3.7

Population Estimates by Sex and Age Group (01.VII.2020) (Based on the results of the 2011 Population Census.):

Age group	Male	Female	Total	%
Total	1 217 976	1 286 522	2 504 498	100
0–4	168 415	164 699	333 114	13.30
5–9	157 646	154 774	312 420	12.47
10–14	137 092	135 235	272 327	10.87
15–19	118 166	117 873	236 039	9.42
20–24	118 207	121 535	239 742	9.57
25–29	110 095	115 411	225 506	9.00
30–34	94 967	99 744	194 711	7.77
35–39	74 591	80 644	155 235	6.20
40–44	61 719	67 206	128 925	5.15
45–49	49 370	56 034	105 404	4.21
50–54	37 319	44 620	81 939	3.27
55–59	28 792	37 243	66 035	2.64
60–64	20 002	28 448	48 450	1.93
65–69	15 303	21 162	36 465	1.46
70–74	11 841	16 460	28 301	1.13
75–79	6 904	11 064	17 968	0.72
80+	7 547	14 370	21 917	0.88
Age group	Male	Female	Total	Percent
0–14	463 153	454 708	917 861	36.65
15–64	713 228	768 758	1 481 986	59.17
65+	41 595	63 056	104 651	4.18

== Vital statistics ==
=== United Nations estimates ===
Registration of vital events in Namibia is not complete. The website Our World in Data prepared the following estimates based on statistics from the Population Department of the United Nations.

	Mid-year population	Live births	Deaths	Natural change	Crude birth rate (per 1000)	Crude death rate (per 1000)	Natural change (per 1000)	Total fertility rate (TFR)	Infant mortality (per 1000 live births)	Life expectancy (in years)
1950	515,000	22,000	12,000	10,000	42.0	22.5	19.5	5.75	141.7	41.5
1951	521,000	22,000	12,000	10,000	42.0	22.4	19.6	5.79	140.3	41.8
1952	527,000	22,000	12,000	11,000	42.0	22.0	20.0	5.83	137.6	42.4
1953	534,000	22,000	12,000	11,000	42.0	21.6	20.4	5.89	134.7	43.0
1954	540,000	23,000	11,000	11,000	41.9	21.1	20.8	5.93	131.8	43.7
1955	547,000	23,000	11,000	12,000	41.7	20.7	21.1	5.97	128.8	44.3
1956	555,000	23,000	11,000	12,000	41.6	20.2	21.4	6.01	125.7	44.9
1957	562,000	23,000	11,000	12,000	41.6	19.7	21.8	6.05	122.6	45.6
1958	571,000	24,000	11,000	13,000	41.6	19.2	22.3	6.10	119.4	46.3
1959	580,000	24,000	11,000	13,000	41.6	18.8	22.8	6.14	116.1	46.9
1960	590,000	25,000	11,000	14,000	41.8	18.2	23.5	6.21	112.9	47.7
1961	601,000	25,000	11,000	15,000	42.0	17.8	24.2	6.27	109.7	48.4
1962	614,000	26,000	11,000	15,000	42.3	17.3	25.0	6.34	106.6	49.1
1963	627,000	27,000	11,000	16,000	42.6	16.9	25.7	6.40	103.5	49.7
1964	642,000	28,000	11,000	17,000	42.8	16.4	26.3	6.43	100.6	50.4
1965	658,000	28,000	11,000	18,000	43.0	16.0	26.9	6.46	97.8	51.0
1966	675,000	29,000	11,000	18,000	43.1	15.7	27.4	6.49	95.1	51.4
1967	693,000	30,000	11,000	19,000	43.3	15.4	27.9	6.51	92.5	52.0
1968	712,000	31,000	11,000	20,000	43.5	15.0	28.5	6.54	90.1	52.6
1969	733,000	32,000	11,000	21,000	43.6	14.6	29.0	6.55	87.7	53.1
1970	754,000	33,000	11,000	22,000	43.7	14.3	29.4	6.55	85.4	53.6
1971	777,000	34,000	11,000	23,000	43.9	13.9	30.0	6.55	83.1	54.2
1972	801,000	35,000	11,000	24,000	43.9	13.5	30.4	6.55	80.8	54.8
1973	825,000	36,000	11,000	26,000	44.1	13.1	30.9	6.56	78.6	55.4
1974	850,000	37,000	11,000	27,000	44.1	12.8	31.3	6.56	76.3	55.9
1975	877,000	39,000	11,000	28,000	43.9	12.4	31.5	6.54	74.2	56.5
1976	902,000	39,000	11,000	28,000	43.5	12.0	31.5	6.50	72.2	57.0
1977	926,000	40,000	11,000	29,000	42.9	11.7	31.3	6.45	70.5	57.6
1978	942,000	40,000	11,000	30,000	42.3	11.3	31.0	6.38	69.0	58.1
1979	957,000	39,000	11,000	29,000	41.0	11.1	29.9	6.32	67.6	58.4
1980	976,000	40,000	11,000	28,000	40.6	11.6	28.9	6.25	66.3	56.8
1981	987,000	40,000	11,000	28,000	39.7	11.4	28.4	6.16	64.9	57.1
1982	1,006,000	39,000	11,000	28,000	38.6	11.0	27.6	6.08	63.3	57.6
1983	1,033,000	40,000	11,000	29,000	38.5	10.8	27.8	6.00	61.5	58.0
1984	1,062,000	41,000	11,000	30,000	38.5	10.4	28.1	5.93	59.5	58.5
1985	1,093,000	42,000	11,000	31,000	38.5	10.1	28.3	5.85	57.3	59.0
1986	1,128,000	43,000	11,000	32,000	38.5	9.8	28.7	5.77	55.0	59.6
1987	1,165,000	45,000	11,000	34,000	38.7	9.5	29.2	5.67	52.8	60.2
1988	1,208,000	47,000	11,000	36,000	38.9	9.4	29.5	5.58	51.0	60.2
1989	1,288,000	49,000	10,000	39,000	39.3	8.4	30.9	5.47	49.2	62.6
1990	1,369,000	55,000	11,000	44,000	40.6	8.3	32.2	5.32	48.0	62.5
1991	1,416,000	57,000	12,000	45,000	40.1	8.4	31.6	5.23	47.0	62.1
1992	1,462,000	57,000	13,000	45,000	39.1	8.6	30.5	5.07	46.4	61.5
1993	1,510,000	57,000	13,000	44,000	37.8	8.8	29.1	4.89	46.1	60.9
1994	1,558,000	57,000	14,000	42,000	36.3	9.1	27.2	4.67	46.4	59.8
1995	1,605,000	55,000	15,000	40,000	34.6	9.5	25.1	4.43	47.2	58.6
1996	1,650,000	54,000	17,000	38,000	33.1	10.2	22.8	4.21	48.1	56.9
1997	1,693,000	55,000	18,000	37,000	32.6	10.8	21.8	4.15	48.9	55.6
1998	1,736,000	56,000	20,000	36,000	32.6	11.6	21.0	4.15	49.5	54.1
1999	1,778,000	57,000	22,000	36,000	32.3	12.1	20.1	4.11	49.8	53.0
2000	1,819,000	57,000	23,000	34,000	31.4	12.7	18.7	3.98	49.8	52.0
2001	1,856,000	56,000	24,000	32,000	30.4	13.1	17.3	3.83	49.7	51.3
2002	1,889,000	56,000	25,000	31,000	29.7	13.1	16.6	3.72	49.1	51.3
2003	1,915,000	56,000	25,000	31,000	29.2	13.2	15.9	3.62	49.0	51.1
2004	1,939,000	56,000	26,000	31,000	29.0	13.2	15.8	3.58	48.9	51.2
2005	1,963,000	57,000	25,000	32,000	29.0	13.0	16.1	3.56	46.8	51.8
2006	1,987,000	58,000	25,000	33,000	29.0	12.5	16.5	3.54	43.9	52.7
2007	2,011,000	59,000	24,000	35,000	29.3	12.0	17.2	3.55	41.2	53.7
2008	2,039,000	61,000	24,000	37,000	29.7	11.6	18.1	3.59	38.1	54.7
2009	2,068,000	62,000	23,000	39,000	30.1	11.2	18.9	3.61	36.2	55.5
2010	2,099,000	64,000	23,000	41,000	30.4	11.1	19.4	3.63	34.3	56.0
2011	2,132,000	66,000	23,000	43,000	30.8	10.9	19.9	3.66	34.6	56.6
2012	2,167,000	67,000	23,000	45,000	31.1	10.4	20.7	3.68	35.0	57.6
2013	2,205,000	68,000	22,000	46,000	30.9	9.9	21.0	3.65	34.2	58.7
2014	2,243,000	69,000	21,000	48,000	30.7	9.4	21.3	3.64	33.5	59.8
2015	2,283,000	70,000	21,000	49,000	30.4	9.1	21.3	3.60	33.4	60.7
2016	2,323,000	70,000	20,000	50,000	30.1	8.7	21.4	3.57	32.5	61.7
2017	2,365,000	70,000	20,000	50,000	29.5	8.5	21.0	3.51	31.6	62.3
2018	2,406,000	70,000	20,000	50,000	29.0	8.4	20.6	3.46	31.0	62.6
2019	2,447,000	70,000	20,000	49,000	28.4	8.2	20.2	3.40	29.8	63.1
2020	2,688,000	76,000	21,000	55,000	27.7	7.5	20.2	3.35	29.5	64.1
2021	2,770,000	76,000	26,000	50,160	27.0	9.2	17.8	3.30	28.7	60.9
2022	2,851,000	76,000	22,000	54,535	27.9	7.5	18.9	3.25	28.7	64.2
2023	2,928,000	77,000	18,000	58,436	25.9	6.2	19.7	3.21	27.2	67.4
2024				59 739	25.9	6.2	19.7	3.21		
2025				59 567	25.4	6.2	19.3	3.17		

View source data.
View source data.
View source data.
View source data.

=== Demographic and Health Surveys ===
Total Fertility Rate (TFR) (followed by wanted fertility rate in brackets) and Crude Birth Rate (CBR):

Year	Total		Urban		Rural	
Year	CBR	TFR	CBR	TFR	CBR	TFR
1992	42	5.4 (4.8)	43	4.0 (3.4)	42	6.3 (5.8)
2000	30.5	4.2 (3.4)	29.9	3.1 (2.4)	30.8	5.1 (4.2)
2006–2007	29.2	3.6 (2.7)	28.8	2.8 (2.2)	29.6	4.3 (3.3)
2013	29.5	3.6 (2.9)	30.0	2.9 (2.4)	29.3	4.7 (3.5)

Fertility data as of 2013 (DHS Program):

Region	Total fertility rate	Percentage of women age 15–49 currently pregnant	Mean number of children ever born to women age 40–49
Zambezi	4.2	4.5	4.4
Erongo	2.9	6.1	3.3
Hardap	3.7	3.8	3.4
Karas	3.4	6.4	3.4
Kavango	4.6	6.8	5.4
Khomas	2.6	6.4	2.7
Kunene	4.5	8.5	4.6
Ohangwena	5.3	9.8	5.2
Omaheke	4.6	8.6	4.2
Omusati	4.2	6.3	3.6
Oshana	2.7	6.2	3.1
Oshikoto	4.2	5.7	4.0
Otjozondjupa	4.1	5.4	4.0

=== Life expectancy at birth ===
Life expectancy from 1950 to 2015 (UN World Population Prospects):

Period	Life expectancy in Years
1950–1955	41.75
1955–1960	▲45.27
1960–1965	▲48.43
1965–1970	▲51.20
1970–1975	▲53.52
1975–1980	▲56.63
1980–1985	▲58.34
1985–1990	▲60.67
1990–1995	▲61.52
1995–2000	▼58.11
2000–2005	▼53.83
2005–2010	▲54.98
2010–2015	▲61.75

== Ethnic groups ==
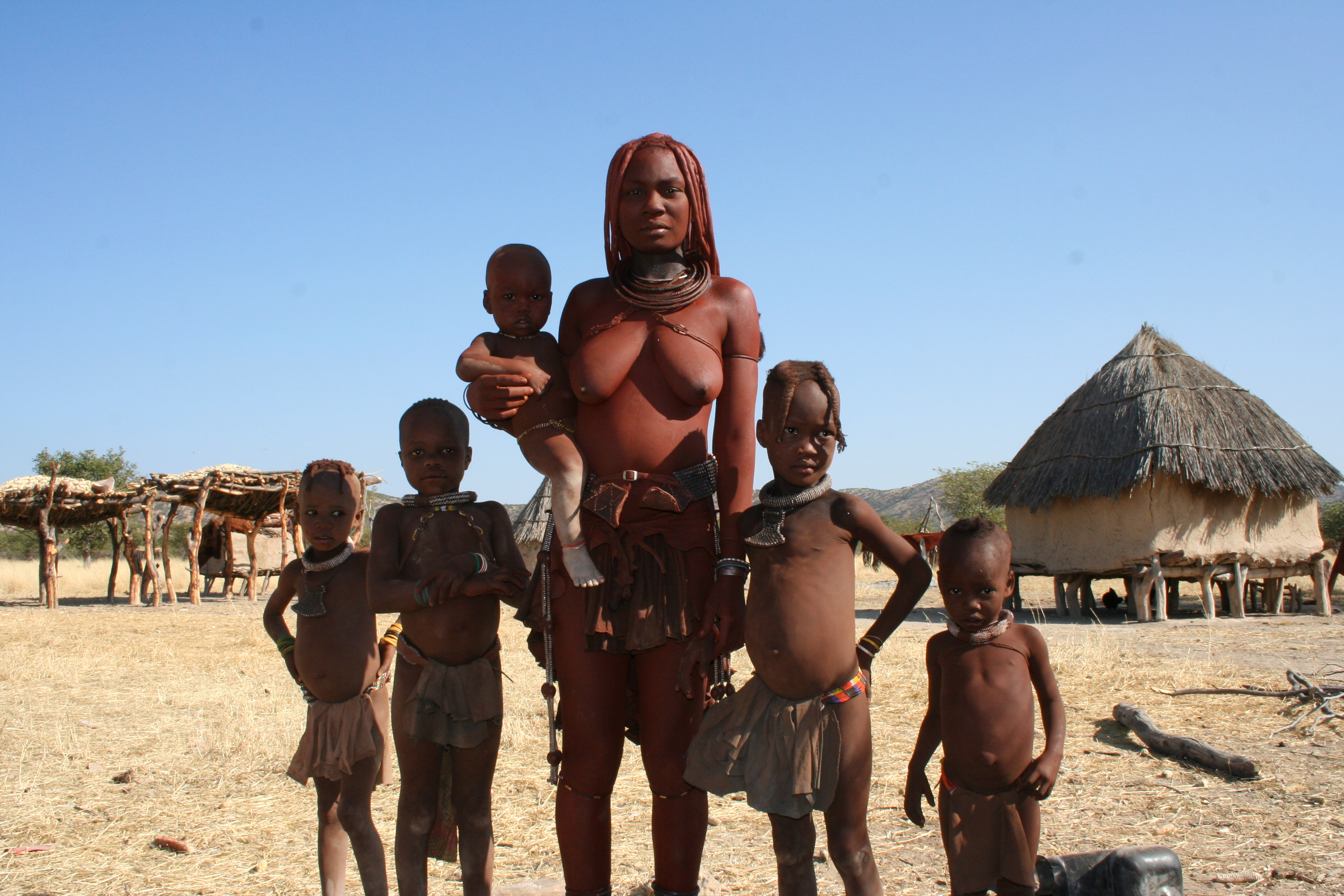
Himba people in northern Namibia

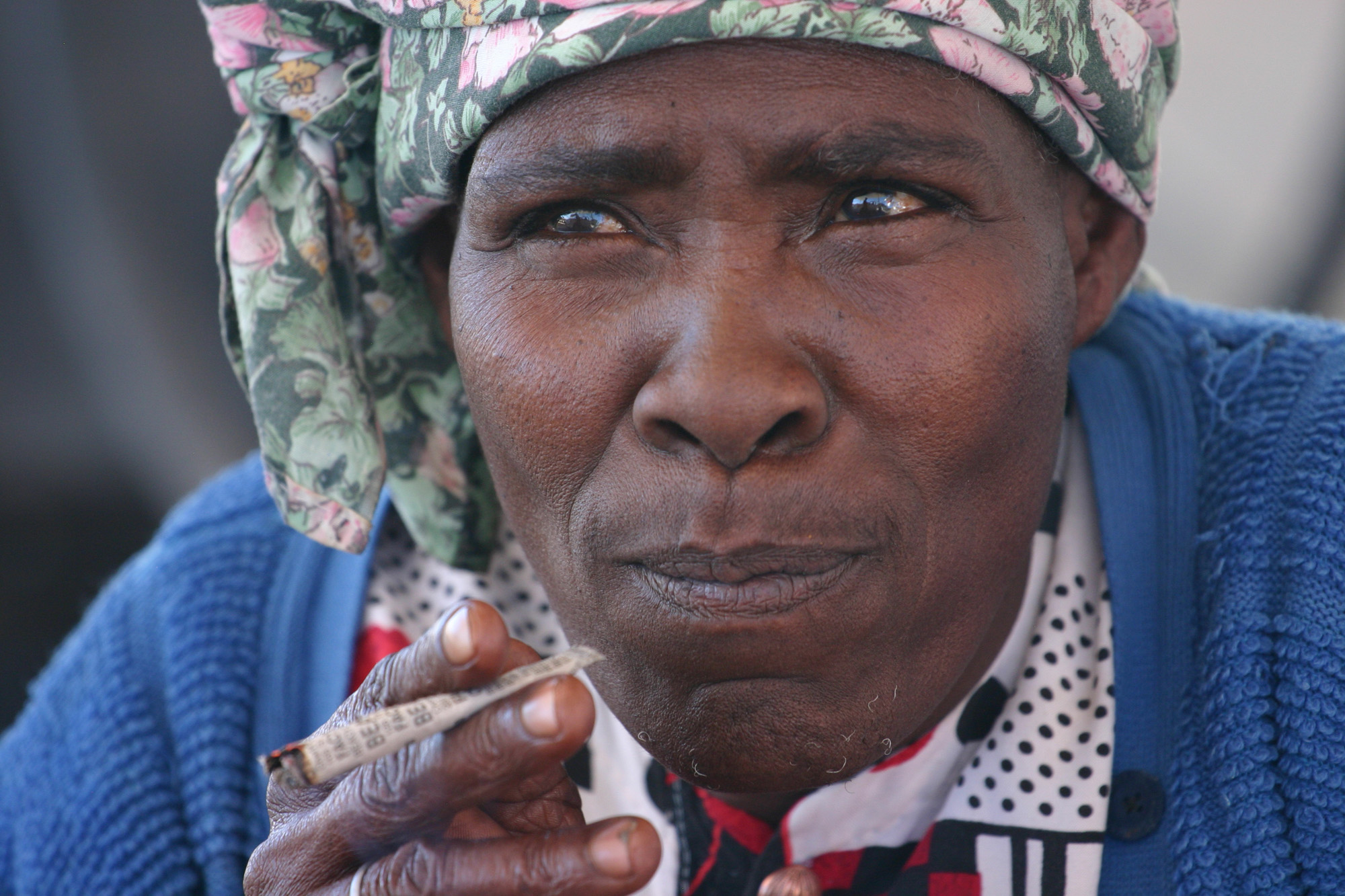
A Nama tribal smoking a roll

Racial groups in Namibia
Racial groups
African	96.1%
Mixed	2.1%
White	1.8%

Tribes in Namibia
Tribe
Ovambo	50.4%
Kavangos	11.6%
Damara	8.5%
Herero	5.9%
Lozi	4.1%
Nama	3.7%
San	2.4%
Tswana	0.4%
Other Tribes	8.4%

Namibia has many ethnic groups. The majority of the Namibian population is of Bantu-speaking origin—mostly of the Ovambo ethnicity, which forms about half of the population—residing mainly in the north of the country, although many are now resident in towns throughout Namibia. They also include the Lozi people and Kavango people. Other ethnic groups are the Herero and Himba people, who speak a similar language, and the Damara, who speak the same "click" language as the Nama. As of 2022 Herero and Nama peoples make up less than 10% of the population, but at the beginning of the 20th century and before the Herero and Nama genocide, they made up a majority.

The largest ten ethnic groups are Aakwanyama, Aandonga, Ovaherero, Damara, Aakwambi, Vakwangali, Nama, Aambalantu, Vakavango, and Aangandjera.

In addition to the Bantu majority, there are large groups of San, who are descendants of the original culture of Southern Africa, as well as Nama who are descendants of the above as well as mixed with colonists. They often speak Khoekhoegowab. The country also contains some descendants of refugees from Angola.

There are also two smaller groups of people with mixed racial origins, called "Coloureds" (2.1%) and "Basters" (1.5%). There is a substantial Chinese minority in Namibia; it stood at 40,000 in 2006.

Whites (mainly of Afrikaner, German, British and Portuguese origin) make up 1.8% of the population, according to the 2023 Population and Housing Census. Although their proportion of the population decreased after independence due to emigration and lower birth rates, they still form the third-largest population of European ancestry, both in terms of percentage and actual numbers, in Sub-Saharan Africa (after South Africa and Angola). The majority of Namibian whites and nearly all those who are of mixed race, speak Afrikaans and share similar origins, culture, and religion as the white and coloured populations of South Africa. A large minority of whites (around 30,000) trace their family origins back to the German settlers who colonised Namibia prior to the British confiscation of German lands after World War I, and they maintain German cultural and educational institutions. Nearly all Portuguese settlers came to the country from the former Portuguese colony of Angola. The 1960 census reported 526,004 persons in what was then South West Africa, including 73,464 whites (14%).

== Languages ==
Distribution of Oshiwambo (2011)

Distribution of Khoekhoe (also known as Nama or Damara (2011)

Distribution of Afrikaans (2011)

Distribution of Otjiherero (2011)

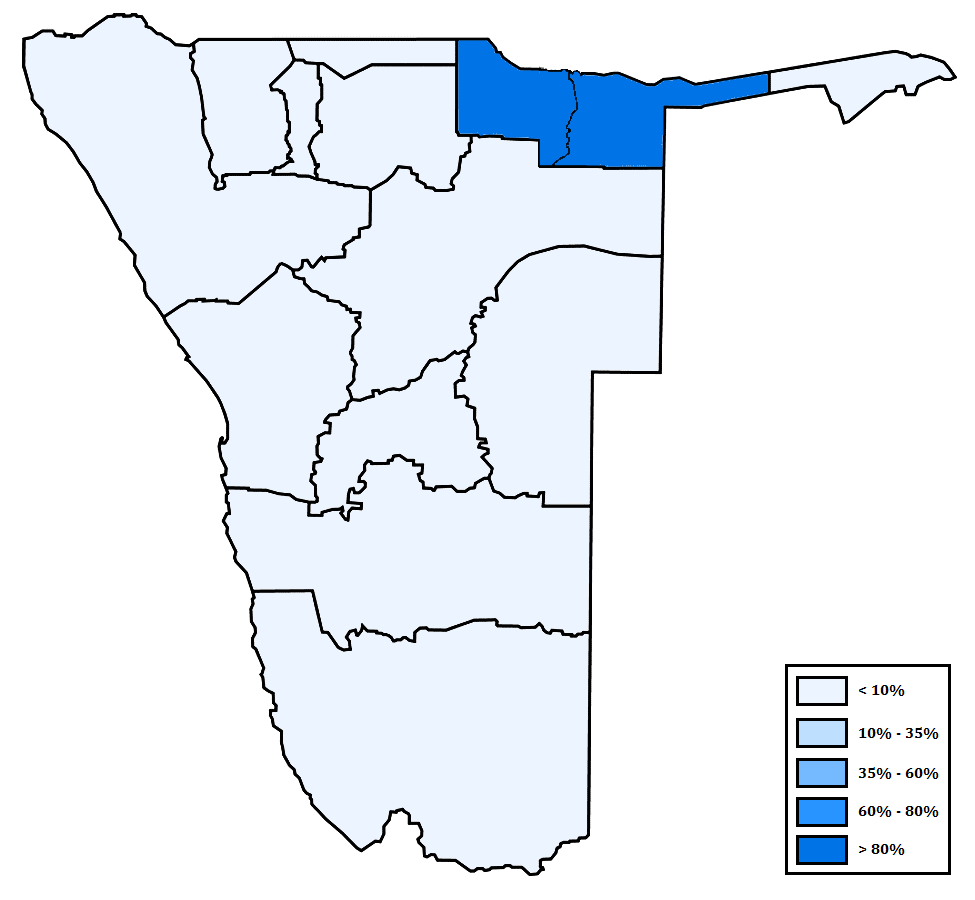
Distribution of Kavango languages (2001)

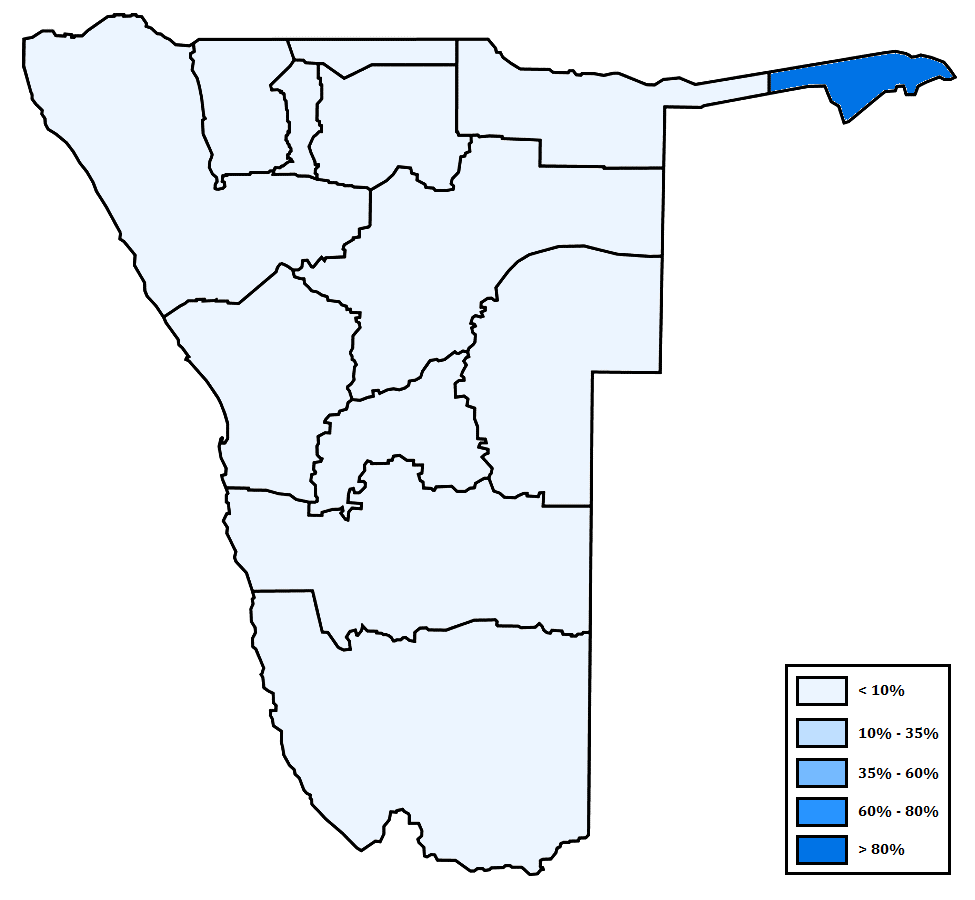
Distribution of Silozi (2001)

Languages of Namibia in 2022.
1. Oshiwambo (48.9%)
2. Khoekhoegowab (11.3%)
3. Afrikaans (11.3%)
4. Otjiherero (8.60%)
5. RuKwangali (8.50%)
6. Silozi (4.80%)
7. English (3.40%)
8. German (1.00%)
9. Other (2.20%)

== Religion ==
Missionary work during the 19th century drew many Namibians to Christianity, especially Lutheranism. While most Namibian Christians are Lutheran, there also are Roman Catholic, Methodist, Anglican, African Methodist Episcopal, and Dutch Reformed Christians represented.

- Christian 80% to 90% (at least 50% Lutheran)
- Indigenous beliefs 10% to 20%
