= Culture of Namibia =

Culture in Namibia is a blend of many different people and its culture and customs have absorbed both African and European elements and fused them into a blend of the two. Although the country is urbanising rapidly, a majority of Namibians still live in rural areas and lead largely impoverished lives. It is among these people, however, that cultural tradition survive most strongly.

One of the sparsest populated countries in the world, Namibia's different cultures span a diverse population, from the Bantu-speaking Ovambo and Herero tribes (the latter of which wear colorful Victorian dress) to the Damara minorities and nomadic San. German colonisation left its own imprint on Namibia, with German being a widely spoken language today and German architecture and cuisine featuring prominently. Namibia's diverse and, at times, harsh climate has contributed to its colourful history.

== Population ==
Namibia has the second-lowest population density of any sovereign country, after Mongolia. In 2017 there were on average 3.08 people per km^{2}. The current population of Namibia is 2,599,944 based on projections of the latest United Nations data.

=== Ethnic groups ===
Namibia has many ethnic groups. The 9 main ethnic groups are:

- Coloured/Baster people
- Herero people
- Kavango people
- Lozi people
- Nama/Damara people
- Ovambo people
- San people
- Tswana people
- White people

These groups can be further broken down into smaller tribes with each having a slightly different dialect from the other.

=== Language ===
During the apartheid regime in Namibia, the three languages of English, German, and Afrikaans were designated as the official languages of Namibia. After Namibia gained independence from South Africa in 1990, the new government adopted English as the official language, enshrined in the constitution of the country. English is now used in government, and it is the medium of instruction in schools and universities. However, the schools of Namibia are facing a shortage of teachers proficient in the English language, and a report reveals that 98% of the country's teachers lack sufficient training in the language.

The most widely spoken languages used in households are Oshiwambo dialects, by 49% of the population, Khoekhoegowab by 11%, Afrikaans by 10%, RuKwangali by 9%, Otjiherero by 9%, and Silozi by 4.71%. Other native languages include the Bantu languages Setswana, Gciriku, Fwe, Chikuhane, Mbukushu, Yeyi; and the Khoisan Naro, ǃXóõ, Kung-Ekoka, ǂKxʼauǁʼein and Kxoe. English, the official language, is spoken by 3% of people as their native language. Portuguese was spoken by 4–5% of the total population, i.e. 100,000 people, made up mostly of the Angolan community in 2014. The number of Angolans in Namibia declined from 2014 to 2015. The economic crisis in the neighboring country affected the numbers. Among the white population, 60% speak Afrikaans, 32% German, 7% English, and 1% Portuguese.

Main household language	2001	2011
Oshiwambo	48.5	48.9
Khoekhoegowab	11.5	11.3
Afrikaans	11.4	10.4
Otjiherero	7.9	8.6
RuKwangali	9.7	8.5
Silozi	5.0	4.8
English	1.9	3.4
German	1.1	0.9
San languages	1.2	0.8
Other	1.8	2.4

=== Religion ===
Namibian religion is dominated by various branches of Christianity, with more than 90% of Namibian citizens identifying themselves as Christian. According to the United States Bureau of Democracy, Human Rights and Labor, in 2007 up to 75% were Protestant, including as much as 50% Lutheran. According to the Namibia Demographic and Health Survey of 2013, the proportions are:

- 65.1% Protestant (43.7% Lutheran, 4.4% Seventh-day Adventist, 17.0% Anglican or other Protestant denomination)
- 22.8% Roman Catholic
- 10.5% a non-Christian religion (primarily African traditional religions, Sunni Islam, Buddhism)
- 1.5% unaffiliated or irreligious

Foreign missionary groups operate in the country. The Constitution provides for freedom of religion, and the government generally respects this right in practice. Islam in Namibia is subscribed to by about 9,000 people, many of them Nama. Namibia is home to a small Jewish community of about 100 people.

== Norms and lifestyle ==
=== Dress ===
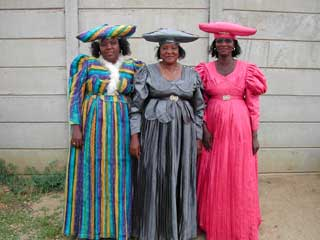
Herero women in Victorian dresses

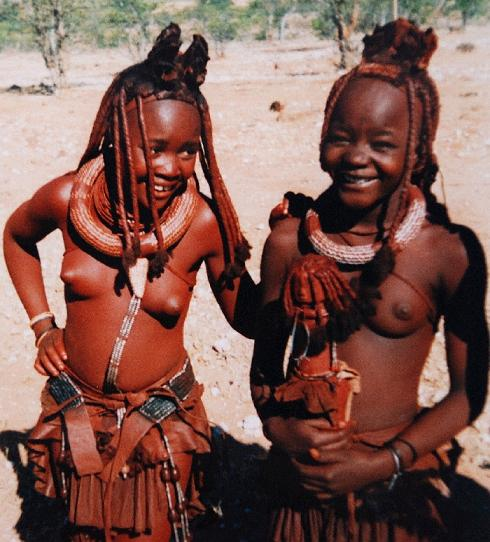
Himba adolescents in northern Namibia, wearing traditional attire. The Erembe headdress indicates that they are no longer children.

Women in different areas of Namibia dress differently from each other. Lozi women wear Musisi or wrap themselves with a sarong called Sitenge. Some women wear traditional clothing while others wear Victorian-styled clothing because of the influence of the missionaries in the area. Herero women wear traditional style clothing and dress with traditional jewellery. The hairstyle indicates their rank and social status. Himba people still wear traditional attire and apply otjize to their skin, a cosmetic mixture of butterfat and ochre pigment. It gives Himba people's skin and hair plaits a distinctive texture, style, and orange or red tinge, and is often perfumed with aromatic resin.

=== Greetings ===
Greetings are especially important to Namibians. Namibians tend to be indirect communicators. Conversations almost always begin with a hello and how are you doing. It is generally considered impolite to just rush into trying to obtain the specific information you need. Extended greetings and handshakes are very important in most Namibian cultures. When food and drink are offered, it is polite to accept. There is a general emphasis on emotional restraint in public, and public displays of affection between spouses or lovers are frowned upon, especially in rural areas.

Along with a curtsy, another traditional show of respect is for the greeter to shake with his or her right hand while at the same time touching their right elbow with their left hand. The curtsy and the elbow touch performed together are very common in the northern regions, especially the rural areas. It is considered common courtesy to greet people in. It is considered disrespectful to not greet people. When entering a room for a meeting, you should greet everyone with a handshake if possible, before sitting down. When asking someone in a public establishment for help (i.e. directions, prices, etc.), always greet first and ask how they are before proceeding to business. Often after shaking someone's hand, Namibians will continue to hold on to each other's hand while conversing, especially if the two people are friends with one another.

When shaking someone's hand especially when its an elder, males are required to nod their heads while females are required to bend their knees a little bit as a form of respect.

=== Family structure ===
In Namibia, most households are not nuclear families but contain other kin as well. The head of the household manages domestic finances, makes important decisions, and organizes productive activities. Parents receive substantial help with child-rearing from other family members. It is not unusual for children to live with other relatives if the parents have work obligations, the child needs to be closer to school, or a relative needs a child's help. Most boys and girls attend primary school, although sometimes they stay at home to help with the livestock or crops.

Corporate kin groups are formed by ties traced through women (matrilineal), men (patrilineal), or both (bilateral), depending on ethnicity. These kin groups provide a support network for their members and control joint property, especially livestock; in the past, they also played significant roles in political and religious affairs. There has been a general shift from matrilineal to patrilineal. For example, wives and children in matrilineal communities can now assert rights to the property of deceased husbands and fathers, which has been traditionally inherited by the man's matrilineal relatives (his siblings and sisters' children). In a Namibian culture, the wealth of a family is measured by how much cattle it has, and families live a semi-nomadic life, following grazing and water sources for their livestock. In the rural communal areas, men and boys generally care for livestock, build and maintain homesteads, plow fields, and contribute some agricultural labor, while women and girls do most of the agricultural labor, food preparation, childcare, and household work.

=== Marriage ===
Weddings are extremely important social events in Namibia, bringing family and friends together to sing, dance, and feast. Most weddings combine old and new elements. Many Owambo couples, for example, say their vows in a church ceremony accompanied by identically dressed bridesmaids and groomsmen, then exit to a crowd of guests shouting praises, dancing, and waving horsetail whisks.

The South African Marriage Act #25 of 1961 (SA) came into force in Namibia on 1 February 1972 when the Marriage Amendment Act, 1970 was brought into force in South West Africa. Men and women of full age have the right to marry and to be found a family. They shall be entitled to equal rights as to marriage, during the marriage, and at its dissolution. Marriage shall be entered into only with the free and full consent of the intending spouses. The family is the natural and fundamental group unit of society and is entitled to protection by society and the State. Marriage was allowed without any limitation due to race, color, ethnic origin, nationality, religion, creed, or social or economic status, but not between "Whites" and "Non-Whites", as defined by the South African government and formalised by the Prohibition of Mixed Marriages Act, 1949. Only in 1985 was this restriction repealed.

According to the Basic Analysis with Highlights, July 2003 reflect the incidence of customary and common law marriages in Namibia indicates that About 56% of the Namibian population is never married, with about 19% being married at common law. And about 9% is married traditionally while 7% is married consensually. Some 3% is divorced persons while about 4% are widowed. The highest incidence of married persons are found m the Caprivi (54%), Kunene (48%) and Kavango (61%) regions.

== Arts ==
The National Theatre of Namibia serves as a venue for both Namibian and foreign musicians and stage actors, in addition to assisting community-based drama groups. School and church groups create and stage less formal productions. Traditional dance troupes representing the various ethnic groups of Namibia perform at local and national festivals and holiday celebrations and also participate in competitions. Many craftspeople produce objects for local use and the tourist trade; wood carvings (containers, furniture, animals) from the Kavango and basketry from Owambo are the best-known examples. Some craftspeople have formed organizations to assist each other with production and marketing.

Namibia has large numbers of rock art sites scattered across the country, especially rock engraving sites. The best-known rock art areas are the Brandberg Massif in Damaraland (2697m – mainly painting sites), and Twyfelfontein, a UNESCO World Heritage rock art site, also in Damaraland. Both of these sites are in the Erongo region in northwestern Namibia. Another important painting area is the Erongo Mountains southeast of the Brandberg.

One of the richest rock painting areas/sites in the subcontinent, the Brandberg has large numbers of sites scattered across its 750 km^{2} which are mostly the work of ancestral Bushman/San hunter-gatherers and may be up to 2,000 years old or more in some cases. Meanwhile, Twyfelfontein is one of the most important rock engraving sites in southern Africa. The most celebrated rock painting is The White Lady rock painting, located on a panel, also depicting other artwork, on a small rock overhang, deep within Brandberg Mountain. The giant granite monolith located in Damaraland and called 'The Brandberg' is Namibia's highest mountain. The painting's German name is Weiße Dame

=== Music ===
Popular styles of music in Namibia include hip hop, R&B, Soul, reggae, afro-pop, house, and kwaito. Upon Namibia's independence, Jackson Kaujeua and Ras Sheehama had been the most outstanding Namibian performers. Kaujeua had been performing since the 1970s, he performed a mix of Namibia's traditional genres with afro-pop/gospel sounds. Other early Namibian musicians include a Setswana band called People's Choice, that was popular between 1996 and 1998 for their hit single "Don't Look Back (Siwelewele)", a kwaito trio called Matongo Family, Boli Mootseng, X-Plode with members (Jaicee James, Lizell Swarts & Christi Nomath Warner Warner Christi), Oshiwambo indigenous rapper Shikololo and R&B turn-producer Big Ben. Big Ben has eventually become the most respected artist through his Afro-pop and Fusion with his live shows. In fact, he is one of the very few that performs all his shows with a live band while many still perform with backtracks. Namibian stars such as Stefan Ludik, The Dogg, Gazza, EES, Lady May, Sunny Boy, Sally Boss Madam, and Big Ben have become continental celebrities as well as Placa Gang a group of hard-working dream chasers.

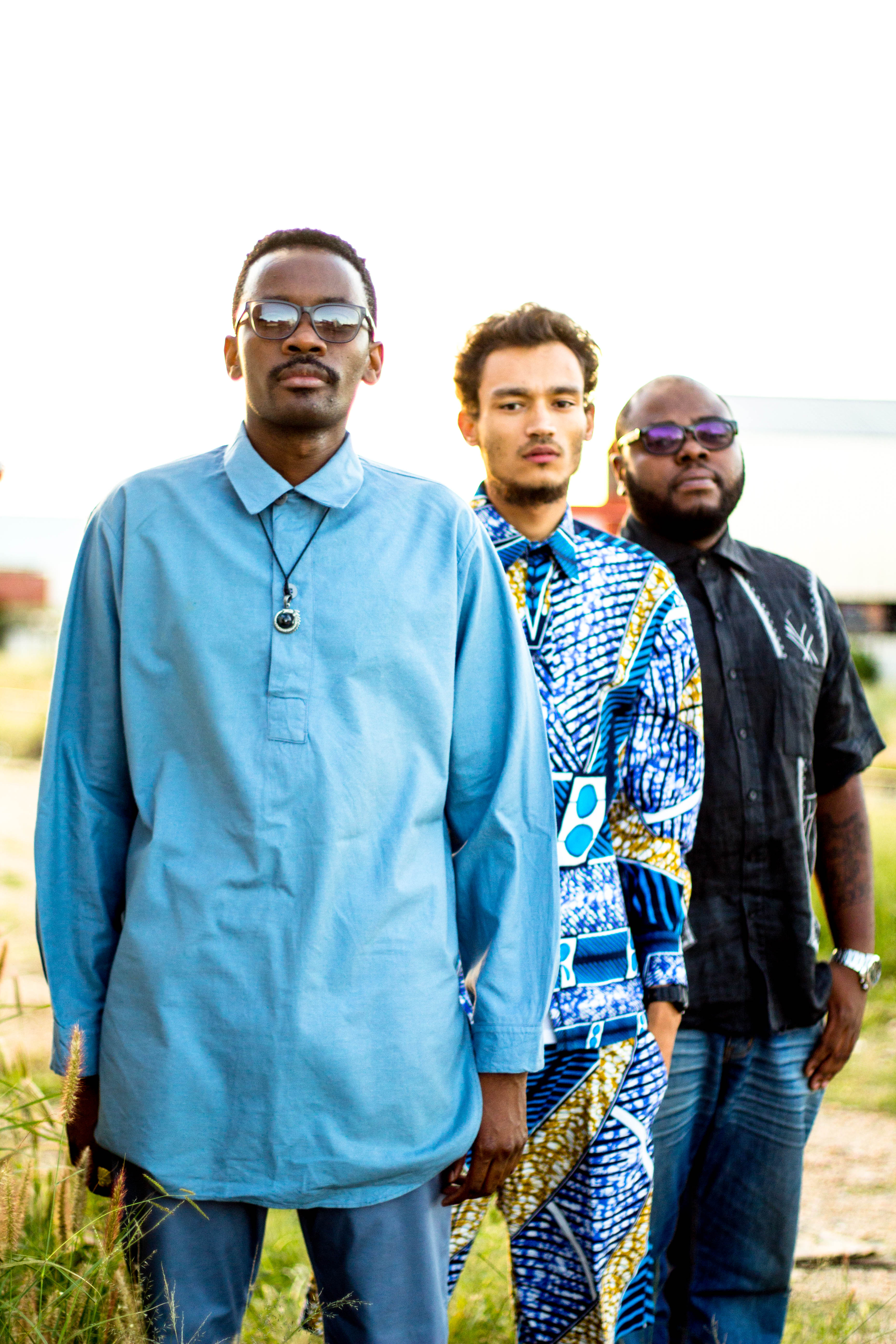
Black Vulcanite- Mark Mushiva (Mark Question), Allain Villet (alithatdude) and Nikolai Tjongarero (Okin). A Namibian Music Group.

The Sanlam-NBC Music Awards and the Namibian Music Awards are two separate institutions that give out annual awards respectively. The Namibia Society of Composers and Authors of Music (NASCAM) has helped promote Namibian music within and outside the country. NAMAS ceremony is run by MTC Namibia and the Namibian Broadcasting Corporation. The awards were introduced to replace the Sanlam-NBC Music Awards, which were run by Sanlam Namibia and the Namibian Broadcasting Corporations.

Traditional Music in Namibia is extremely diverse, partly due to the diversity of language groups and the artificial ethnic separation of the past (apartheid), which discouraged people from freely mixing. Namibian musical practices can probably be generalized following three broad (yet culturally mixed) bands across the region. Cultural sharing, migrations, political history, and even agricultural practices are all inscribed upon bodies and revealed in dance and music. Much of the music is sung in groups, mostly with dance and sometimes drums. Most solo songs are either with bows, lamellophones, or unaccompanied. Traditional Namibian dances occur at events such as weddings and at traditional festivals such as the Caprivi Arts Festival. Folk music accompanies storytelling or dancing. The Nama people use various strings, flutes, and drums while the Bantu use xylophones, gourds, and horn trumpets.

=== Film ===
Before independence, American anthropologist John Marshall made ethnographic films of the Ju/'hoansi for over four decades from 1950 onwards, resulting in documentary films such as The Hunters (1957) and Nǃai, the Story of a ǃKung Woman (1980).

After independence, Namibian filmmakers have started to assert their own identity. Pioneers included Bridget Pickering, Richard Pakleppa, and Cecil Moller. They have been joined by a younger generation including Joel Haikali, Oshosheni Hiveluah, Perivi Katjavivi, Tim Huebschle, and Krischka Stoffels. In 2000, the Namibian government passed the Namibian Film Commission Act to promote filmmaking in the country.

=== Literature ===
Namibian literature before independence was really more an extension of the South African or German literary scene. After independence, at least initially, there was a movement to publish "Namibian" books and create a true "Namibian literature". Examples from that period are the works of Neshani Andreas, Mvula ya Nangolo and Peya Mushelenga. That impetus has since eased off a bit. Most literature in the indigenous languages consists of traditional tales, short stories, and novels written for schoolchildren. Published fiction, poetry, and autobiographical writings appear in both English and Afrikaans.

== Cuisine ==
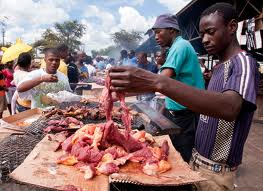
Kapana stall in Katutura

In the precolonial period, indigenous cuisine was characterized by the use of a very wide range of fruits, nuts, bulbs, leaves, and other products gathered from wild plants and by the hunting of game. The domestication of cattle in the region about two thousand years ago by Khoisan groups enabled the use of milk products and the availability of meat. However, during the colonial period, the seizure of communal land in Namibia helped to discourage traditional agriculture and reduced the extent of land available to indigenous people.

For agriculturalists, the staple foods are maize, millet and sorghum; for pastoralists, dairy products. Beans and greens are eaten with millet in the north, but otherwise few vegetables are grown or consumed. Hunting and gathering, more important in the past, still provides a dietary supplement for some. Meat is highly desired and eaten. Important occasions are marked by the slaughter of cattle or goats, and the consumption of meat, home-brewed beer, purchased beverages, and other foods. In some cultures, leftover meat is sent home with the guests.

Food in Namibian cultures:

- Mielie meal
- Kapana, grilled beef strips with hot spices
- Omalodu (Traditional Beer)
- Ombidi (Spinach)
- Oshikundu drink
- Pearl millet porridge (Oshifima)
- Roselle / Mutete
- Tripe (Also known as Afval, a type of edible lining from the stomachs of various farm animals)
- Zambezi bream fish

== Sport ==
Football is highly popular in Namibia. Most children grow up playing the game. Track and field is also a popular sport in the country. Many Namibians run daily chores that demand great physical efforts. Children in rural areas walk or run for long distances daily to reach school. The principal sports in Namibia are Football, Rugby, Cricket, Boxing, Track and field. The home stadium for all national teams is the Independence Stadium in Windhoek, while Sam Nujoma Stadium in Katutura is also occasionally used.

== Education ==
Namibia has a controversial education history. During the time when the apartheid system was still in effect, it was designed to profit the territory's resident Whites. When Namibia was able to attain its independence, that was the only time that the government started to provide funding for the natives themselves. There was much improvement in the educational sector when independence was ratified. It was made by the government to be law. It was made compulsory for children between the ages of 6 and 16 to attend school in Namibian. The education that they have is provided for by the Namibian government however, the student's parents are to the front for the expenses of the uniforms, textbooks, and miscellaneous fees of the school. The government also has made provisions to extend education not only to men but also to women.

The Namibian constitution and Education Act (2001) frame the education system as the following: "compulsory school attendance exists for the seven years of primary school, respectively for children between the age of six ( 6 ) and sixteen (16). School fees are not allowed for primary education." These were six levels of education in Namibia: pre-primary, lower primary (grades 1–4), upper primary (grades 5–7), junior secondary (grades 8–10), senior secondary (grades 11 & 12), and tertiary (university) but the curriculum was revised in 2014 and implemented from 2015 .

The revised junior primary curriculum was implemented in January 2015 while the revised curriculum for the senior primary phase (grades 4–7) was implemented in 2016 and implementation of the revised curriculum for the Junior Secondary curriculum was: grade 8 in 2017, grade 9 in 2018. The revised curriculum for the senior secondary Phase for grade 10 was implemented in 2019 and for grade 11 in 2020. In the revised curriculum the junior primary phase is from Grade 1 to 3 while the senior primary phase is from Grade 4 to 7. The junior secondary phase, which consists of Grade 8 and 9, are required to write junior secondary semi-external examinations at the end of Grade 9 – similar to what the Grade 10 results were.

The senior secondary phase starts at Grade 10 and the National Senior Secondary Certificate Ordinary Level (NSSCO) is a two-year course, covered in Grade 10 and 11. Grade 11 is the first exit point in the senior secondary phase. Learners receive an internationally recognized National Senior Secondary Certificate Ordinary. Learners may choose to continue to grade 12, tertiary institutions, vocational education and training institutions, or into the job market. Upon completing grade 12, school leavers have an internationally recognized certificate, National Senior Secondary Certificate Higher Level, which gives them access to higher education institutions, or the job market.

As of 2022, Namibia has 1,947 primary and secondary schools, up from 1,723 schools in 2013. These schools cater for a total of 822,574 pupils (2013: 24,660 teachers, 617,827 pupils). Most of the country experiences a shortage of schools, school hostels, and classroom space. Many Namibian schools are built in a uniform design that was suggested by the Chilean-born (turned Swedish citizen) architect Gabriel Castro, in the 1990s.

=== Universities and Colleges in Namibia ===
- University of Namibia (UNAM)
- Namibia University of Science and Technology (NUST)
- International University of Management (IUM)
- Namibian College of Open Learning (NamCOL)
- The University Centre for Studies In Namibia (TUCSIN)

=== Vocational Training centers ===
- Namibian Institute of Mining and Technology (NIMT)
- Rundu Vocational Training Centre, Rundu, Kavango Region
- Valombola Vocational Training Centre, Ongwediva, Oshana Region
- Windhoek Vocational Training Centre, Windhoek, Khomas Region
- Zambezi Vocational Training Centre, Katima Mulilo, Zambezi Region
- Eenhana Vocational Training Centre, Eenhana, Ohangwena Region
- Nakayale Vocational Training Centre, Outapi, Omusati Region
- Okakarara Vocational Training Centre, Okakarara, Otjozondjupa
