= Cinema of Namibia =

The Cinema of Namibia refers to cinema in the country of Namibia, which claimed its independence from South Africa in 1990.

Before independence, American anthropologist John Marshall made ethnographic films of the Ju/'hoansi for over four decades from 1950 onwards, resulting in documentary films such as The Hunters (1957) and Nǃai, the Story of a ǃKung Woman (1980).

The movie The Gods Must Be Crazy (1980) took place in Namibia. Kalahari bushman N!xau was hired as an actor and paid in cattle.

In 2000, the Namibian government passed the Namibian Film Commission Act to promote filmmaking in the country. Disney's The Young Black Stallion (2003) was shot in the Namibian desert.

Following the ShutItAllDown movement (2020), Namibian cinema picked up on the themes of gender-based violence and social evolution.

== Notable Namibian Filmmakers ==
After independence, Namibian filmmakers have started to assert their own identity.

Here are several notable Namibian filmmakers that have added to Namibia's cinema history:

- Bridget Pickering (born 1966) is a film maker and producer from Namibia, and she was an executive producer on the 2004 film Hotel Rwanda, and she also directed Mama Africa series.
- Richard Pakleppa (born 1961) is a white Namibian screenwriter, film director and film producer.
- Cecil Moller (born 1967) is a Namibian film director and producer, who served as a chairman for the Namibian Film Commission (2004–2007) and he received the Best Film Director Award at the 2017 Namibian Film & Theatre Awards.
- Tim Huebschle (born 1978) is a Namibian producer and director.
- Philippe Talavera, is a Namibian director and founder of the Ombetja Yehinga Organisation (OYO).

They have been joined by a younger generation including:

- Joel Haikali is a Namibian director, film producer and writer and he was also a chairperson for the Namibia Film Commission.
- Oshosheni Hiveluah (born 22 October 1981) is a Namibian writer, producer and director.
- Perivi Katjavivi,
- Krischka Stoffels.
