= 1996 Cannes Film Festival =

- Official poster of the 49th Cannes Film Festival
- Opening film: Ridicule
- Closing film: Flirting with Disaster
- Location: Cannes, France
- Founded: 1946
- Awards: Palme d'Or: Secrets & Lies
- Hosted by: Sabine Azéma
- No. of films: 22 (In Competition)
- Festival date: 9 May 1996 – 20 May 1996
- Website: festival-cannes.com/en

Cannes Film Festival
- 1997 1995

The 49th Cannes Film Festival took place from 9 to 20 May 1996. American filmmaker Francis Ford Coppola served as jury president for the main competition. Sabine Azéma hosted the opening and closing ceremonies.

British filmmaker Mike Leigh won the Palme d'Or, the festival's top prize, for the drama film Secrets & Lies.

The festival opened with Ridicule by Patrice Leconte, and closed with Flirting with Disaster by David O. Russell.

1996 Un Certain Regard poster, adapted from an original illustration by Jacques Loustal.

== Juries ==
=== Main competition ===
- Francis Ford Coppola, American filmmaker - Jury President
- Michael Ballhaus, German cinematographer
- Nathalie Baye, French actress
- Henry Chapier, French journalist, presenter and director
- Atom Egoyan, Canadian filmmaker
- Eiko Ishioka, Japanese artist and costume designer
- Krzysztof Piesiewicz, Polish screenwriter
- Greta Scacchi, Italian actress
- Antonio Tabucchi, Italian writer
- Trần Anh Hùng, Vietnamese-French filmmaker

=== Camera d'Or ===
- Françoise Fabian, French actress - Jury President
- Gian Luca Farinelli, Cinephile
- Ramon Font, Critic
- Sandrine Gady, Cinephile
- Jacques Kermabon, Critic
- Daniel Schmid, Swiss director
- Antoine Simkine, French member of the Fédération Nationale des Industries

== Official Selection ==
=== In competition ===
The following feature films competed for the Palme d'Or:

English title	Original title	Director(s)	Production country
Breaking the Waves		Lars von Trier	Denmark, Sweden, France, Netherlands, Norway, Iceland, Finland, Italy, Germany, United States
My Sex Life... or How I Got into an Argument	Comment je me suis disputé... (ma vie sexuelle)	Arnaud Desplechin	France
Crash		David Cronenberg	Canada
Drifting Clouds	Kauas pilvet karkaavat	Aki Kaurismäki	Finland
Earth	Tierra	Julio Medem	Spain
The Eighth Day	Le huitième jour	Jaco Van Dormael	Belgium, France
Fargo		Joel Coen	United States, United Kingdom
Goodbye South, Goodbye	南國再見,南國	Hou Hsiao-hsien	Taiwan, Japan
Kansas City		Robert Altman	United States
The Quiet Room		Rolf de Heer	Australia
Ridicule (opening film)		Patrice Leconte	France
The Second Time	La seconda volta	Mimmo Calopresti	Italy
Secrets & Lies		Mike Leigh	United Kingdom, France
A Self-Made Hero	Un héros très discret	Jacques Audiard	France
Stealing Beauty	Beauté volée / Io ballo da sola	Bernardo Bertolucci	France, Italy, United Kingdom
The Sunchaser		Michael Cimino	United States
Temptress Moon	風月	Chen Kaige	China
Thieves	Les voleurs	André Téchiné	France
Three Lives and Only One Death	Trois vies & une seule mort	Raúl Ruiz	France
Too Late	Prea târziu	Lucian Pintilie	Romania
Tree of Blood	Po di Sangui	Flora Gomes	Guinea-Bissau, France
The Van		Stephen Frears	Ireland

=== Un Certain Regard ===
The following films were selected for Un Certain Regard section:

English title	Original title	Director(s)	Production country
At Full Gallop	Cwał	Krzysztof Zanussi	Poland
Bastard Out of Carolina		Anjelica Huston	United States
La Bouche de Jean-Pierre		Lucile Hadžihalilović	France
Buenos Aires Vice Versa	Buenos Aires viceversa	Alejandro Agresti	Argentina, Netherlands
The Ferry	Pramis	Laila Pakalniņa	Latvia
Few of Us	Mūsų nedaug	Šarūnas Bartas	Lithuania
Fourbi		Alain Tanner	France, Switzerland
Gabbeh	گبه	Mohsen Makhmalbaf	Iran, France
Haifa		Rashid Masharawi	Palestine
Hard Eight	Sydney	Paul Thomas Anderson	United States
I Shot Andy Warhol		Mary Harron	United States, United Kingdom
Irma Vep		Olivier Assayas	France
Looking for Richard		Al Pacino	United States
Love Serenade		Shirley Barrett	Australia
Lulu		Srinivas Krishna	Canada
The Mail	Pasts	Laila Pakalniņa	Latvia
Mossane		Safi Faye	Senegal
No Way to Forget		Richard Frankland	Australia
The Pallbearer		Matt Reeves	United States
The Pillow Book		Peter Greenaway	Netherlands, United Kingdom, France, Luxembourg
A Saturday on Earth	Un samedi sur la terre	Diane Bertrand	France
Some Mother's Son		Terry George	Ireland, United States
A Summer's Tale	Conte d'été	Éric Rohmer	France
Traveling Companion	Compagna di viaggio	Peter Del Monte	Italy
The Waste Land		Deborah Warner	United Kingdom

=== Out of Competition ===
The following films were selected to be screened out of competition:

English title	Original title	Director(s)	Production country
The Elective Affinities	Le affinità elettive	Paolo and Vittorio Taviani	Italy, France
Flirting with Disaster (closing film)		David O. Russell	United States
Girl 6		Spike Lee	United States
Microcosmos	Microcosmos: Le peuple de l'herbe	Claude Nuridsany and Marie Perennou	France, Switzerland, Italy, United Kingdom
Opening Day of Close-Up (short)	Il giorno della prima di Close Up	Nanni Moretti	Italy
Runaway Brain (short)		Chris Bailey	United States
Trainspotting		Danny Boyle	United Kingdom

=== Short Films Competition ===
The following short films competed for the Short Film Palme d'Or:

- 4 maneras de tapar un hoyo by Guillermo Rendon Rodriguez, Jorge Villalobos de La Torre
- Attraction by Alexeï Diomine
- Brooms by Luke Cresswell, Steve Mcnicholas
- Estoria do gato e da lua by Pedro Miguel Serrazina
- Film Noir by Michael Liu
- Les fourmis rouges by Pierre Erwan Guillaume
- Oru Neenda Yathra by Murali Nair
- Passeio com Johnny Guitar by João César Monteiro
- Petite Sotte by Luc Otter
- Sin #8 by Barbara Heller
- Small Deaths by Lynne Ramsay
- Szél (Wind) by Marcell Iványi
- The Beach by Dorthe Scheffmann
- This Film Is a Dog by Jonathan Ogilvie

== Parallel sections ==
=== International Critics' Week ===
The following films were screened for the 35th International Critics' Week (35e Semaine de la Critique):

Feature film competition

- Les Aveux de l’innocent by Jean-Pierre Améris (France)
- Yuri by Yoonho Yang (South Korea)
- Mi último hombre by Tatiana Gaviola (Chile)
- The Empty Mirror by Barry J. Hershey (United States)
- The Daytrippers by Greg Mottola (United States)
- A Drifting Life by Lin Cheng-sheng (Taiwan)
- Not Me! (Sous sol) by Pierre Gang (Canada)

Short film competition

- Planet Man by Andrew Bancroft (New Zealand)
- A Summer Dress (Une robe d’été) by François Ozon (France)
- La Grande migration by Youri Tcherenkov (France)
- Le Réveil by Marc Henri Wajnberg (Belgium)
- The Slap by Tamara Hernandez (United States)
- La Tarde de un matrimonio de clase media by Fernando Javier León Rodríguez (Mexico)
- Derrière le bureau d’acajou by Johannes S. Nilsson (Sweden)

=== Directors' Fortnight ===
The following films were screened for the 1996 Directors' Fortnight (Quinzaine des Réalizateurs):

- A toute vitesse by Gaël Morel
- Beautiful Thing by Hettie MacDonald
- A Chef in Love by Nana Djordjadze
- Le Cri de la soie by Yvon Marciano
- Edipo Alcalde by Jorge Ali Triana
- Encore by Pascal Bonitzer
- Flame by Ingrid Sinclair
- Vaska Easoff (Haggyállógva, Vászka) by Peter Gothar
- Inside by Arthur Penn
- Youth Without God (Jeunesse sans Dieu) by Catherine Corsini
- Jude by Michael Winterbottom
- Kids Return by Takeshi Kitano
- Prisoner of the Mountains (Kavkazskiy plennik) by Sergei Bodrov
- La Promesse by Jean-Pierre Dardenne, Luc Dardenne
- Lone Star by John Sayles
- Macadam Tribu by José Laplaine
- Mondani a mondhatatlant: Elie Wiesel üzenete by Judit Elek
- Perfect Love (Parfait amour!) by Catherine Breillat
- Pasajes by Daniel Calparsoro
- Salut cousin ! by Merzak Allouache
- Select Hôtel by Laurent Bouhnik
- Trees Lounge by Steve Buscemi
- White Night (Layla Lavan) by Arnon Zadok
- Will It Snow for Christmas? (Y aura t’il de la neige à Noël ?) by Sandrine Veysset

Short films

- La Faim by Siegfried (18 min.)
- La Fille et l’amande by Bénédicte Brunet (15 min.)
- Vacances A Blériot by Bruno Bontzolakis (25 min.)
- Virage Nord by Sylvain Labrosse (15 min.)

== Official Awards ==
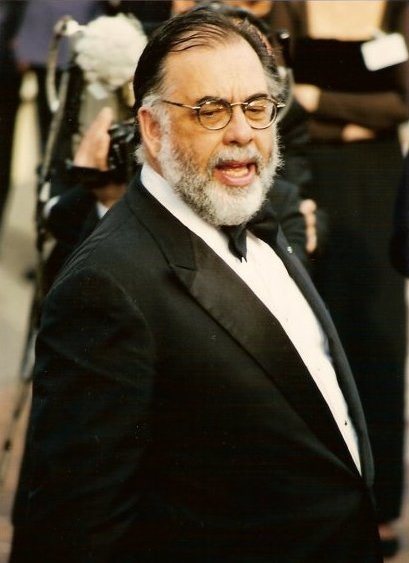
Francis Ford Coppola, Jury President

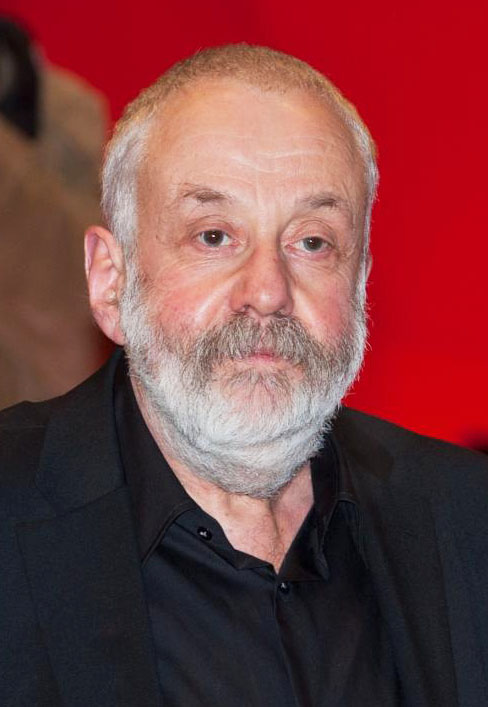
Mike Leigh, Palme d'Or winner

=== In Competition ===
- Palme d'Or: Secrets & Lies by Mike Leigh
- Grand Prix: Breaking the Waves by Lars von Trier
- Best Director: Joel Coen for Fargo
- Best Screenplay: A Self-Made Hero by Jacques Audiard and Alain Le Henry
- Best Actress: Brenda Blethyn for Secrets & Lies
- Best Actor: Daniel Auteuil and Pascal Duquenne for The Eighth Day
- Jury Special Prize: Crash by David Cronenberg

=== Caméra d'Or ===
- Love Serenade by Shirley Barrett

=== Short Film Palme d'Or ===
- Szél by Marcell Iványi
- Jury Prize: Small Deaths by Lynne Ramsay

== Independent Awards ==
=== FIPRESCI Prizes ===
- Secrets & Lies by Mike Leigh (In competition)
- Prisoner of the Mountains by Sergei Bodrov (Directors' Fortnight)
- The Mail & The Ferry by Laila Pakalnina (Un Certain Regard)

=== Commission Supérieure Technique ===
- Technical Grand Prize: The whole technical team for Microcosmos

=== Prize of the Ecumenical Jury ===
- Secrets & Lies by Mike Leigh
  - Special Mention:
    - A Drifting Life by Lin Cheng-sheng
    - Drifting Clouds by Aki Kaurismäki

=== Award of the Youth ===
- Foreign Film: White Night by Arnon Zadok
- French Film: Les aveux de l'innocent by Jean-Pierre Améris

=== International Critics' Week ===
- Mercedes-Benz Award: Les aveux de l'innocent by Jean-Pierre Améris
- Canal+ Award: Planet Man by Andrew Bancroft

=== Award the First Multimedia Day at the 49th Cannes Film festival ===
- Best Cyber Poster Award: The Visionary by Beny Tchaicovsky

== Media ==
- INA: Opening of the 1996 Festival (commentary in French)
- INA: List of winners of the 1996 festival (commentary in French)
