= Katjavivi =

Katjavivi is a surname occurring in Namibia. Notable people with the surname include:

- Jane Katjavivi (1952–2022), English-born Namibian author, publisher and editor
- Perivi Katjavivi (born 1984), Namibian-British filmmaker
- Peter Katjavivi (born 1941), Namibian politician, diplomat, and academic administrator
