= 100 Bucks =

2015 Namibian documentary film

- Directed by: Oshosheni Hiveluah
- Written by: Onesmus Shimwafeni
- Produced by: Cecil Moller; Mutaleni Nadimi
- Cinematography: Raphael Scriba
- Edited by: Bjoern Rheder
- Music by: Steffen List; Becoming Phill
- Release date: July 2012 (Namibia)
- Running time: 24 min.
- Country: Namibia
- Languages: Otjiherero; English

100 Bucks is a 2012 Namibian short film directed by Oshosheni Hiveluah and co-produced by Cecil Moller and Mutaleni Nadimi. The film focused on an urban story of the journey of a 100-Namibian Dollar note that passes from the hands of wealth to the hands of need and through thieving hands.

The film received positive reviews and won several awards at international film festivals. The film won the Audience Choice Award at the 2012 Namibia Film and Theatre Awards. In 2011, Oshosheni received the Focus Features Africa First program Prize for 100 Bucks. 100 Bucks also won the 2012 Namibian Theatre and Film Audience Choice award. 100 Bucks was screened in London by the non-profit organization AfricAvenir Windhoek as well as in New York in 2012 at the African Diaspora International Film Festival (ADIFF).

== Cast ==
- Steven Afrikaner as Tsotsi 2
- Sylvanie Beukes as Dantagob
- Girley Jazama as Maria
- Perivi Katjavivi as Nolan
- Victor Mtambanengwe as Elvis
- David Ndjavera as Taxi Driver
- Lynn Strydom as Tameka
- Tanya Terblanche as Reyna
- Ripuree Tjitendero as Lia
- Onesmus Uupindi as Tsotsi 1
