= Africa Is a Woman's Name =

2010 documentary film

- Directed by: Wanjiru Kinjanjui; Ingrid Sinclair; Bridget Pickering
- Written by: Wanjiru Kinyanjui; Cristina Lopez-Palao; Bridget Pickering; Ingrid Sinclair
- Story by: Cristina Lopez-Palao
- Produced by: Cristina Lopez-Palao; Ana Menendez; Helena Subijana; Loreley Yeowart
- Starring: Njoki Ndung'u; Amai Rosie; Phuti Ragophala
- Cinematography: George Andare; Francesco Biagini; Esko Metsola
- Edited by: Lizzie Minnion; Wilfried Prager; Andres Prieto
- Production companies: Transparent Productions; Zimmedia production company
- Distributed by: Women Make Movies
- Release date: 2010
- Running time: 88 minutes
- Countries: Kenya; Zimbabwe; South Africa; Spain
- Language: English

Africa Is a Woman's Name is a 2010 documentary film created and produced by Cristina Lopez-Palao through her poroduction company Transparent Productions and distributed by Women Make Movies (WMM). It was directed by Wanjiru Kinjanjui, Ingrid Sinclair and Bridget Pickering. It lasts for 88 minutes.

== Synopsis ==
Three Prestigious African Female Filmmakers. Three Charismatic African Women. Three Outlooks on Gender and Empowerment. Female power embodied in lives of three remarkable African women from different social levels and origins determined to bring about radical transformations in their day-to-day realities.

The film stars three women, each of whom tell their life stories: Amai Rose from Zimbabwe is a businesswoman and housewife, Phuti Ragophala is a South African school teacher and principal, and Njoki Ndung’u from Kenya is a politician, a member of Kenya's parliament, a supreme court judge and a human rights attorney and supporter. The three women express their opinions about what women and children in African cultures need to succeed. The film is a documentary that upholds gender equality as a fundamental principle in the growth of democracy and the creation of a better future, as well as a necessary condition for reducing poverty, it portrays a women's revolution in Africa of the era (the late 2000s and early 2010s).

== Cast ==
- Njoki Ndung'u as herself
- Rhuti Ragophala as herself
- Amai Rosie as herself
