= Phillip Talavera =

French choreographer and film director

Philippe Talavera is a French choreographer and film director who has been living in Namibia since 1997. In 2001, he founded the Ombetja Yehinga Organisation Trust.

Talavera has worked in Namibia since 2000 on programmes such as HIV prevention and education through the arts. He directed the 2024 Namibian film Lukas, which was nominated in 2025 for the "Best Indigenous Language (Southern Africa)" film in the Africa Magic Viewers Choice Awards. Talavera also directed the films Kapana (2020), Kukuri (2018), Salute! (2017), and Pap and Milk (2016).

Talavera completed his studies in France. He holds a Ph.D in veterinary sciences as well as a DEE in human biochemistry. He also studied performing arts.
