= Tjiraa =

2012 Namibian short film

- Directed by: Krischka Stoffels
- Production company: New Mission Films
- Release date: June 5, 2012
- Country: Namibia
- Language: Otjiherero

Tjiraa is a 2012 Namibian short drama film, directed by Krischka Stoffels. The screenplay was written by Toucy Tjijambo. The movie is almost entirely in Otjiherero, one of the indigenous Namibian languages.

== Plot summary ==
The film follows Vezuva, a young Ovaherero woman who returns from her studies abroad, in Germany, only to discover that her married cousin has died, and that according to tradition, she is expected to marry her cousin's widower.

Vezuva complies with her family's wishes, although she is in love with someone else, and finds herself trapped in an abusive relationship. By the end of the film, she turns her family's attitude around and is able to leave, with their blessing.

== Background ==
The film's title, Tjiraa, is short for the Otjiherero word for "cousin", tjiramue. The marriage tradition described in the film is a long-standing one, which developed in order to retain wealth and power within tribes and families in times of trouble. The tradition, however, creates situations such as the one faces by Vezuva, in which she is expected to live within a violent and abusive marriage, lacking in any basis of love, affection or respect. The film's message is that even traditions that were formed for good reasons, or with good intentions, can become harmful and negative. In the film, Vezuva's family - including her mother, who is the one who pushed her to marry - see the harm and change their attitude. The social change occurring in this narrative reflects the existing discourse in Ovaherero society, which attempting to navigate and balance between tradition and modern life.

== Production and Release ==
The film was financed by the Namibia Film Commission. It was selected for screening at multiple international film festivals, including the New York film festival, African Diaspora International Film Festival, and Cannes Film Festival.
