= Kapana =

Kapana may stand for:

- Kapaná, an alternative name for the Madí language
- Kapana (grilled meat), a beef dish in Namibia
- Kapana (film), Namibian film
