= Hairareb =

2019 Namibian film

- Directed by: Oshoveli Shipoh
- Screenplay by: Aina Kwedhi
- Produced by: Dantagos Jimmy; Ellen Ernst
- Starring: David Ndjavera; Claudine de Groot
- Cinematography: Antonio Tsuob
- Production company: Ndapunikwa Investments
- Release date: 30 August 2019
- Country: Namibia
- Language: English

Hairareb is a 2019 Namibian drama film directed by Oshoveli Shipoh in his directorial debut. The film stars David Ndjavera and Claudine de Groot in the lead roles. The plot of the film is loosely based on a novel with the same title written by August C. Bikeur and the title role was played by the lead actor, David Ndjavera. The film was released on 30 August 2019. Before the release of the film, it was regarded as one of the most anticipated Namibian films of 2019. It received critical acclaim from the critics for its narrative, direction, and cinematography.

== Production ==
The project was announced by newcomer Oshoveli Shipoh as his maiden directorial venture, and the principal photography commenced in October 2018 and went on floors continuously until January 2019. The official teaser was unveiled in October 2018. The portions of the film were mostly shot and set in Okarundu and in Otjimbingwe. The film is produced by production studio Ndapunikwa Investments in association with the Namibia Film Commission. The official trailer of the film was unveiled on 1 March 2019.

== Cast ==
- David Ndjavera as Hairareb
- Claudine de Groot as Ininis (Hairareb's bride)
- Hazel Hinda as Moira (Hairareb's assistant)
- Maximilian Kadeen Kaoseb as Nausub
- Moria Kambrude as Khaxas
- Ashriff Naomunic Feris as Hairareb Jr.
- Bianca Heyns as Nurse Yvonne
- Mauritia Gawanas as Anmire

== Synopsis ==
The plot follows a flashback storyline where a boy finds a diary in the past and begins to read it, revealing the life of his father and his hidden truths.

== Plot ==
Hairareb (David Ndjavera), a wealthy farmer fighting hard to stay afloat in the terrible drought, then marries a young, attractive, beautiful lady, Ininis (Claudine de Groot), with hidden motives. When he marries her, he struggles to talk to her independently. The relationship between them slowly starts to break up due to their personality differences.

== Nominations ==
The film received seven nominations at the 2019 Namibia Theatre and Film Awards (NTFA).

Year	Award	Category	Result	Ref
2019	Namibia Theatre and Film Awards	Best Script	Nominated	
2019	Namibia Theatre and Film Awards	Best Director - Oshoveli Sipoh	Nominated	
2019	Namibia Theatre and Film Awards	Best Sound and music	Nominated	
2019	Namibia Theatre and Film Awards	Best Editor	Nominated	
2019	Namibia Theatre and Film Awards	Best Cinematographer - Antonio Tsuob	Nominated	
2019	Namibia Theatre and Film Awards	Best Male actor - David Ndjavera	Nominated	
2019	Namibia Theatre and Film Awards	Best Narrative	Nominated	
2021	Africa Movie Academy Awards	Best Film	Nominated	
2021	Africa Movie Academy Awards	Best Director - Oshoveli Sipoh	Nominated	
2021	Africa Movie Academy Awards	Best Actor in a Leading Role - David Njavera	Nominated	
2021	Africa Movie Academy Awards	Best Actress in a Leading Role - Claudine de Groot	Nominated	
2021	Africa Movie Academy Awards	Best Actress in a Supporting Role - Hazel Hinda	Won	
2021	Africa Movie Academy Awards	Achievement in Screenplay	Nominated	
2021	Africa Movie Academy Awards	Best Sound	Nominated	
2022	Africa Magic Viewers' Choice Awards	Best Movie Southern Africa	Pending	
