= Uushimba =

2016 Namibian short film

- Directed by: Khama Nakanduungileh
- Screenplay by: Perivi Katjavivi
- Produced by: Gustav Nuujoma
- Production company: Optimistic Media Group Namibia Film Commission
- Release date: 17 September 2016
- Running time: 25 minutes
- Country: Namibia
- Language: English

Uushimba (City Life) is a 2016 Namibian short film directed by Khama Nakanduungileh. The film focuses on the young man who moved to the city in pursuit of a better life and opportunities. He dreamed of becoming an architect; however, his dream was instead lured into gangsterism by his cousin.

The film premiered at Afrikikas Film Festival on 17 September 2016 in Namibia. The film was also invited for screening at the 18th Zimbabwe International Film Festival and Trust (ZIFFT) hosted in Harare from 1 to 8 October 2016.

== Cast ==
The cast of Uushimba includes:

- Gustav Nuuyoma as Hangula
- Jason Shivute as Tangeni
- Elago Ndapewa Shitaatala as Katrina
- James Paulus as Kalipi
- Kondja Lungameni as Gibson
- Jekonia Akuunda as Ndjeke

== Production ==
Uushimba was filed in three locations Northern part of Namibia, Okahandja, and Windhoek. The film is jointly produced by Optimistic Media Group and Namibia Film Commission.
