= My Father's Son =

My Father's Son may refer to:

- My Father's Son (album), a 1991 album by Ricky Skaggs
- My Father's Son (TV series), a 1988 Hong Kong comedy television drama
- My Father's Son (film), a 2010 Namibian comedy film
