= Alejandro Cooper =

Namibian actor

- Born: 2012 (age 13–14); Keetmanshoop
- Occupation: Actor
- Years active: 2024-present

Alejandro Cooper (born 2012 at Keetmanshoop) is a young Namibian actor, known for the Ombetja Yehinga Organization Trust film, Lukas as well as in Uno and Hatago film. Cooper was named a winner for the best young African actor category on 16 November 2024 at Sotigui awards in Ouagadougou, Burkina Faso. He won the award while he was a grade seven learner at Moses van der Byl primary School. He was a first Namibian to be nominated in this category, he was also nominated at other festival in Nigeria, Egypt, Italy and United States.

== Filmography ==
Year	Film	Role	Genre	Ref.
2024	Lukas	Lukas	film	
2024	Uno and Hatago		film	
