= Taste of Rain =

Taste of Rain may refer to:

- Taste of Rain (2012 film), directed by Richard Pakleppa
- A Taste of Rain (album), 1991 album by Martyn Campbell
- The Taste of Rain... Why Kneel, 1991 album by Deep Puddle Dynamics
