= Salute! (film) =

2017 Namibian drama film

- Directed by: Philippe Talavera
- Written by: Philippe Talavera
- Produced by: OYO Films
- Starring: Adriano Visagie; Odile Muller; David Ndjavera
- Cinematography: Bernd Curschmann
- Edited by: Haiko Boldt
- Music by: Ponti Dikuua; Walter Kahivere
- Release dates: October 2017 (Warehouse Theater); 15 August 2018 (Namibia)
- Running time: 70 minutes
- Country: Namibia
- Language: Afrikaans

Salute! is a 2017 Namibian drama film directed by Philippe Talavera and produced as an Ombetja Yehinga Organisation Trust (OYO) film. It stars Adriano Visagie, Odile Muller, and David Ndjavera in lead roles, along with newcomer Monray Garoëb. The film focused on the life of Carlito 'Kado', who is sentenced to three years in prison for fraud, leaving his pregnant girlfriend to fend for herself in the real world.

The film premiered in October 2017 at the Warehouse theatre. The film received positive reviews and won several awards at international film festivals.

== Awards ==
On 30 November 2019 at Canal Olympia Ouaga 2000, in Ouagadougou, Burkina Faso, lead actor Adriano Visagie won the Sotigui Award for Best Actor in Southern Africa. It is also nominated as best film in Southern Africa at the 2018 Africa Magic Viewers' Choice Awards (AMVCA), as well as selected at AIDS 2018 in Amsterdam.

== Plot ==
Salute! follows the story of Carlito "Kado," a young man whose life took a sharp turn when he was sentenced to three years in prison for committing fraud. Behind bars, Kado is confronted with the harsh realities of prison life

== Cast ==
- Adriano Visagie as Carlito 'Kado'
- Odile Muller
- David Ndjavera
- Monray Garoëb
- Dawie Engelbrecht
- Desmond Kamericka
- Sakanombo Kasoma
- Jeremiah Jeremiah
- Dennis!Kharuchab
- Bruno Caldeira
- Mara Baumgarther
