= Flame (1996 film) =

1996 film by Ingrid Sinclair

- Directed by: Ingrid Sinclair
- Produced by: Joel Phiri; Simon Bright
- Starring: Marian Kunonga; Ulla Mahaka
- Distributed by: California Newsreel
- Release date: 1996
- Running time: 85 minutes
- Language: English

Flame is a controversial 1996 war film directed by Ingrid Sinclair, produced by Joel Phiri and Simon Bright, written by Ingrid Sinclair, Barbara Jago and Philip Roberts (writer) and stars Marian Kunonga and Ulla Mahaka. It was the first Zimbabwean film, since independence, to be set in the Rhodesian Bush War. It served as a tribute to the Zimbabwe African National Liberation Army's many female guerrillas.

== Plot ==
At the height of the Rhodesian Bush War, Florence, an impulsive teenage peasant girl from the Mashonaland countryside, decides to run away and join the Zimbabwe African National Liberation Army (ZANLA) after her father is detained by the Rhodesian Security Forces. She is joined on her journey by her friend, Nyasha; together, the duo trek across the border to a ZANLA training camp in neighbouring Mozambique. While undergoing guerrilla training, the girls adopt new revolutionary identities: Nyasha chooses the nom de guerre "Liberty", signifying her desire for independence, while Florence brands herself "Flame" to represent her passionate nature.

Flame becomes pregnant after being raped by Comrade Che, an unscrupulous ZANLA political commissar. Although initially devastated, she reconciles herself to raising her infant son in the camp. Flame subsequently survives a Rhodesian air strike that kills both Che and their child. Deciding that she has nothing to live for but the war effort, she throws herself into her training and soon distinguishes herself in several ZANLA raids targeting infrastructure and commercial farms.

The end of the war and the election of Robert Mugabe in 1980 proves bittersweet for Flame, who finds it difficult to adjust to civilian life. Many unemployed ZANLA veterans, including Flame and her new husband, feel disillusioned and neglected by Mugabe's government. Flame subsequently relocates to Harare, where Liberty has used her background as an intelligence officer to secure a lucrative administrative post. The reunion between the two is somewhat tense, as Flame wants financial assistance but Liberty no longer believes in the collectivist lifestyle of mutual support and shared purpose once pursued in the guerrilla camps.

Five years after the war's end, Flame and Liberty attend a Heroes' Day party in an increasingly authoritarian and corrupt Zimbabwe. They continue to greet passers by with the old pan-African slogan, "A luta continua" ("the struggle continues") as the film closes.

== Cast ==
- Marian Kunonga as Florence (Flame)
- Ulla Mahaka as Nyasha (Liberty)
- Robina Chombe as Charity
- Dick Chingaira as Rapo

== Production ==
The film was shot in Zimbabwe.

== Reception ==
Flame was selected for the 1996 Cannes Film Festival.

=== Awards ===
Flame received several awards in the following film festivals:

Southern African Film Festival, Harare

- OAU Prize - Best Film
- Jury Award - Best Actress
- Jury Award - Best Director

Journées de Cinématographe de Carthage, Tunis

- Special Jury Prize - Best Film

Amiens Film Festival, Amiens, France

- Prix du Public - Best Film
- Palmares du Jury - Best Actress
- OCIC Award - Best Film

M-Net Film Awards, Cape Town

- Best Music

The Annonay International Film Festival, France

- The Grand Prix - Best Film

The Milan African Film Festival

- Premio del Pubblico (The Public Prize)
- Concorso Lungometraggi - Migliore Opera Prima (Best First Film)

The Human Rights Watch International Film Festival, New York

- The Nestor Almendros Prize

The International Women's Film Festival in Turenne (1998)

- The Jury Award for Best Film
- The Youth Award for Best Feature Film

=== In Zimbabwe ===
After being shown to the Veterans Association of Zimbabwe, the veterans claimed it was "full of lies" and were angered by the rape scene. The film was confiscated by police for being "subversive and pornographic", but was returned to the producers after a worldwide campaign. Ultimately, it passed Zimbabwean censors and became a box office success and the number one film of the year in Zimbabwe.
