= Kapana (film) =

2019 Namibian gay love story film

Kapana is a 2019 Namibian gay love story film directed by Philipp Talavera and written by Senga Brockerhoff and Mikiros Garoes. The film follows the story of two young men, George and Simeon, who come from different backgrounds but find love in the city of Windhoek, Namibia.

The word kapana comes from preparing raw meat, commonly beef, by grilling it over an open fire; it is frequently sold at open markets.

== Plot ==
The film introduces Simeon, a street vendor selling grilled meat (Kapana) in Windhoek's busy marketplace. George is a successful businessman who regularly visits the market to buy food for his restaurant. Despite their differing social backgrounds, the two develop a close bond and fall in love.

Their relationship faces opposition from wider society and their families, who disapprove of their union. Despite these challenges, George and Simeon remain committed to each other and persevere, demonstrating that their love transcends social and familial boundaries.

== Cast ==
The cast includes:

- Simon Hanga as Simeon
- Adriano Visagie as George
- Mikiros Garoes as Frieda
- Felicity Celento as Rebekka
- Elize de Wee as Ousie Rosa
- Dawie Engelbrecht as Joe
- Foreversun Haiduwah as Tangeni
- Albertina Hainane as Cecilia
- Jeremiah Jeremiah as Nghilifa
- Chanwrill Vries as Gerald
- Ndakolo Haiduwa as Mattheus
- Lucas Paulus as Josh
- Joseph Ortman as Petrus

== Production ==
Kapana was filmed on location in Windhoek, Namibia. The film was produced by Ombetja Yehinga Organisation Trust. It's them follows an LGBTQ +- love story between an insurance broker and a Kapana Seller.

== Release ==
The film premiered at the Namibia Film Festival in 2019 and received positive reviews from critics and audiences alike. Kapana: A Namibian Love Story went on to be screened at several international film festivals, showcasing Namibian talent on a global stage.

== Reception ==
Kapana was praised for its heartfelt storytelling, strong performances, and stunning cinematography. Critics noted the film's exploration of class differences and the power of love to overcome societal barriers.

== Award ==
Kapana won the Hivos Free To Be Me Award in March 2022 at Krakeling theater in Amsterdam. The film also won Best Narrative Feature at the African Diaspora Cinema Festival in Italy and the US, Best Narrative Feature Black Star International Film Festival in Ghana, and Best International Film at the PRIDE Queer Film Festival in Australia.
