= Erold Naomab =

Namibian academic

Vice-chancellor of the Namibia University of Science and Technology
- Incumbent
- Assumed office 1 January 2021
- Preceded by: Tjama Tjivikua

Personal details
- Born: 2 April 1977 (age 49) Omaruru, Erongo Region
- Education: University of Namibia; Nottingham Trent University

Erold Naomab (born 2 April 1977) is a Namibian academic. He was the vice-chancellor of the Namibia University of Science and Technology (NUST) from 2021 till 2025.

== Early life and education ==
Naomab was born on 2 April 1977. He grew up Omaruru in the Erongo Region of Namibia. He attended schools in Omaruru, Okombahe and Otjiwarongo. After a brief stint at a consultancy firm, Naomab started tertiary education at the University of Namibia, graduating with Bachelor and Master of Science. He then studied at Nottingham Trent University in England and obtained another master's degree (Research in Strategic Resource Management) as well as a PhD in Science.

== Career ==
Naomab worked at the Southern Campus of the University of Namibia (UNAM) in Keetmanshoop where he rose to the position of assistant pro-vice chancellor, UNAM's highest-ranking administrator at that campus. In January 2021 he was appointed vice-chancellor of the Namibia University of Science and Technology (NUST), succeeding the founding rector Tjama Tjivikua, and taking over from Andrew Niikondo who acted in that position. In October 2025, Naomab was suspended from his position at NUST over alleged mismanagement, two months before his regular contract expiry.

In September 2024 Naomab was appointed chairperson of the board of the Association of African Universities for Southern Africa (AAU SARO).
