= Paths to Freedom (film) =

2014 documentary film

Paths to Freedom: The story of the birth of Namibia's armed struggle against South Africa is a 2014 documentary film directed by Richard Pakleppa.

== Background ==
The film was produced by On Land Productions, in collaboration with the Namibian Broadcasting Corporation, with participation from the Namibian Film Commission. The film was released in Namibia in July 2014. The film features interviews complemented by a poetic visual narration and an original soundtrack created by Hishishi Papa and Philippa Miller. The narrative voice of the film is provided by Johannes ‘Chops’ Tshoopara. Some of the interviewed struggle icons, John Nankudthu and Priskilia Tuhadeleni, passed away during the course of the production.

== Synopsis ==
Paths to Freedom recounts how Namibian peasants and migrant workers formed a guerrilla army, SWAPO, and a nationalist movement in the 1960s to resist South Africa's UN-mandated occupation of their homeland. The movie tells the story of how Namibians broke free from domestic slavery and went on to fight South Africa.

== Awards ==
The film won the Best Sound Design and Best documentary film during the 2014 Namibian Theatre and Film Awards.

== Cast ==
- Michael McElhatton
- Brendan Coyle
- Deirdre O'Kane
- Pat Leavy
- Ian Fitzgibbon
- Peter McDonald
