= Peter Katjavivi =

Namibian politician

The Honorable Peter Katjavivi
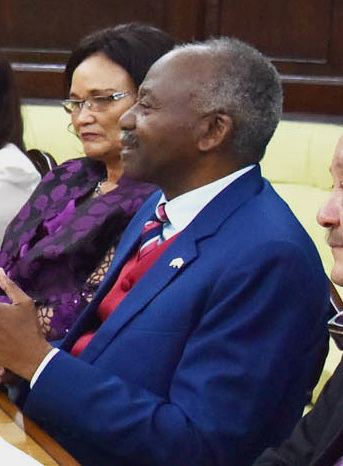
- Katjavivi in 2017

Speaker of the National Assembly
- In office 21 March 2015 – 21 March 2025
- President: Hage Geingob (2015–2024); Nangolo Mbumba (2024-2025)
- Preceded by: Theo-Ben Gurirab
- Succeeded by: Saara Kuugongelwa

Vice-Chancellor of the University of Namibia
- In office 1992–2003
- Succeeded by: Lazarus Hangula

Chancellor of the Namibia University of Science and Technology
- Incumbent
- Assumed office October 2016
- Deputy: Tjama Tjivikua

Personal details
- Born: 12 May 1941 (age 85) Okahandja; South-West Africa
- Party: SWAPO
- Spouse: Jane Katjavivi (1981–2022)
- Children: 5 (including Perivi Katjavivi)
- Occupation: Politician
- Profession: Professor

Peter Hitjitevi Katjavivi (born 12 May 1941) is a Namibian politician who served as Speaker of the National Assembly of Namibia from March 2015 until March 2025. He was also the chancellor of the Namibia University of Science and Technology from 1992 to 2003. Previously he was the founding Vice-Chancellor of the University of Namibia from 1992 to 2003, Ambassador to the European Union from 2003 to 2006, Ambassador to Germany from 2006 to 2008, and Director General of the National Planning Commission from 2008 to 2010.

== Life and career ==
Peter Katjavivi was born in Okahandja and attended a primary school in Windhoek, then the Augustineum Secondary School in Okahandja (1960–61) and the Government College Umuahia, Nigeria (1963-1966). In 1966/67, he began studying History, Law, and Political Science at the University of Dar es Salaam, Tanzania. Katjavivi joined SWAPO in the 1960s and was head of SWAPO's overseas offices in London. In 1986, he obtained a doctorate (DPhil) at St Antony's College, Oxford.

In 1989, he was a member of the Constituent Assembly of Namibia. From 1992 to 2003, he was Vice-Chancellor of the University of Namibia, which he had significantly helped to found. Katjavivi was a member of numerous national and international educational, cultural, and research organizations. He served as President of the Namibia Economic Policy Research Unit beginning in 1990, as Chairman of the Council of National Monuments (now the National Heritage Council of Namibia) from 1992 to 2000, and as an Executive Council Member of UNESCO from 1993 to 1997. From 2003 to 2006, he was Namibia's Ambassador to the European Union in Brussels, and from 2006 to 2008, Ambassador to Germany. He was appointed as Director-General of the National Planning Commission on 8 April 2008.

Following the November 2009 parliamentary election, President Hifikepunye Pohamba appointed Katjavivi to the National Assembly as one of the six non-voting members of parliament appointed by the President for the term that began in March 2010. Subsequently, he was SWAPO's Chief Whip in the National Assembly. He was elected to the National Assembly in the November 2014 parliamentary election as a SWAPO candidate. When the National Assembly began sitting for its new term on 20 March 2015, Katjavivi was sworn in as Speaker of Parliament, succeeding Theo-Ben Gurirab. In 2016 he was appointed chancellor of the Namibia University of Science and Technology (NUST).

== Personal life ==
Katjavivi was married to a British woman Jane, and has five children. Besides his native Herero, he speaks five other languages.

== Awards ==
- Ordre des Palmes Académiques, France, 1996
- Distinguished Academic Visitor Award, New Delhi, India, 1998
- Honorary Doctorate of the University of Joensuu, Finland, 1999
- Certificate of Service to the Executive Council of the Association of African Universities (AAU), 2002
- Most Brilliant Order of the Sun, First Class, Heroes' Day 2014
- Honorary Doctorate of the University, awarded by the University of Bath in December 2018.

== Publications ==
- The Road to Namibian Independence, Gamsberg Macmillan, Windhoek.
- Church and Liberation in Namibia, Zwan Publications, London, 1989.
- A History of Resistance in Namibia, James Currey, London, 1988
