= Namibian cuisine =

Culinary traditions of Namibia

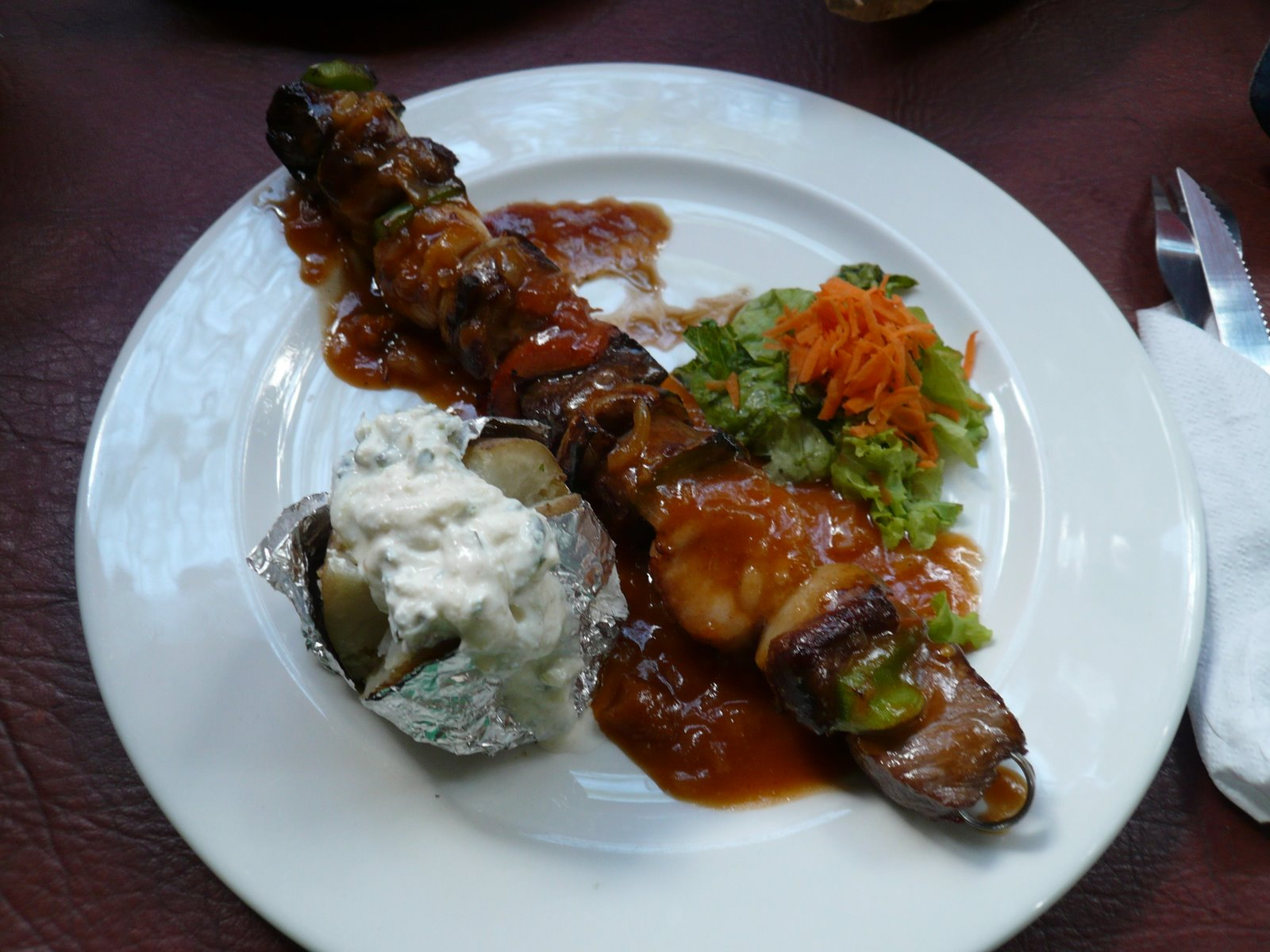
Grilled game: crocodile, kudu and oryx in Windhoek, Namibia

Location of Namibia

Namibian cuisine is the cuisine of Namibia. It is influenced by two primary cultural strands: cookery practised by indigenous people of Namibia such as the Himba, Herero and San groups; and settler cookery introduced during the colonial period by people of German, Afrikaner and British descent.

== Indigenous cookery ==
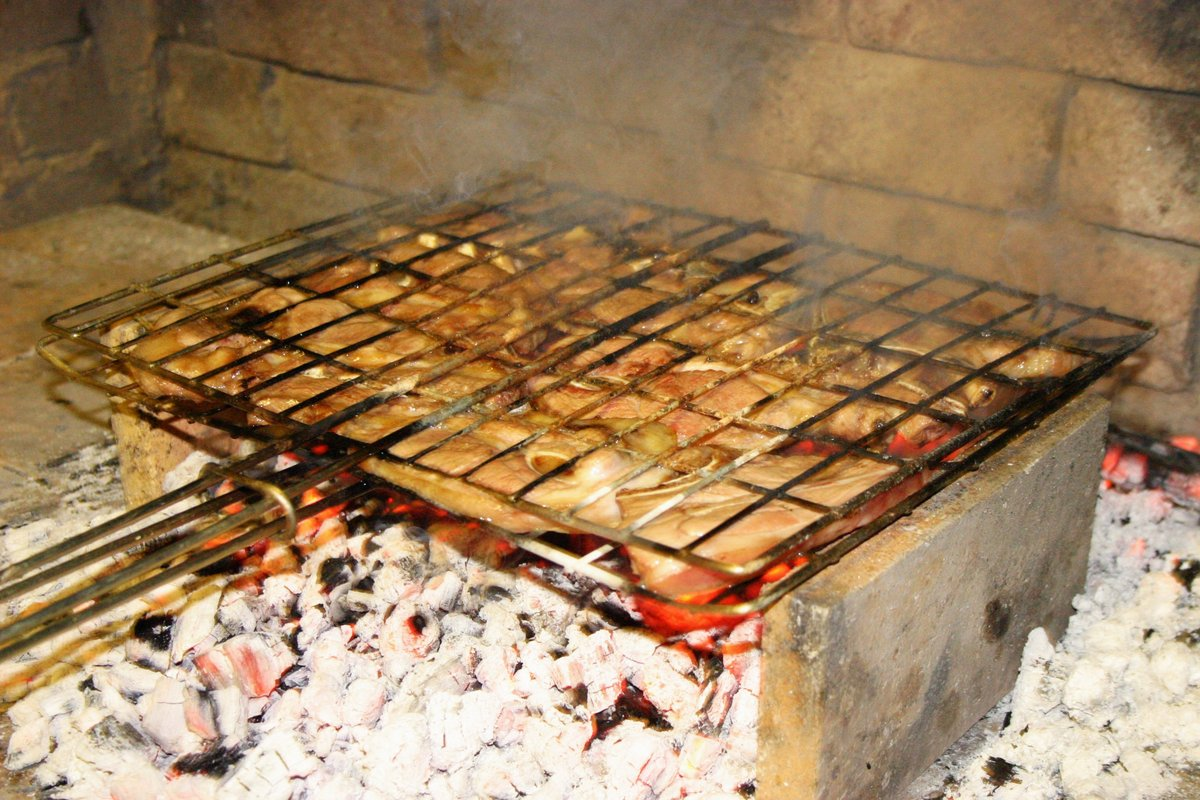
Lamb chops on a braai

In the precolonial period indigenous cuisine was characterised by the use of a very wide range of fruits, nuts, bulbs, leaves and other products gathered from wild plants and by the hunting of wild game. The domestication of cattle in the region about two thousand years ago by Khoisan groups enabled the use of milk products and the availability of meat.

- Vetkoek—a traditional fried-dough bread
- Oshikundu—a drink made from fermented millet

== Colonial cookery ==
Namibia was settled by German colonists during the nineteenth century, and German influence on white Namibian cookery remains very strong. One example of German settler cuisine is Wiener schnitzel.

== Brewing ==
Beer was brewed by many indigenous tribes in the territory that is now Namibia. The recipes depended on locally available ingredients and were brewed to make, for instance, sugar beer and honey beer. The German brewing tradition continued in colonial German South-West Africa. After it quickly proved impractical and expensive to import beer from Germany, breweries were established all over the colony. However, after World War I many Germans were deported and an economic depression set in, and most breweries went out of business.

German lager beers including Tafel and Windhoek lagers are still brewed in the country for domestic consumption and export.

== See also ==
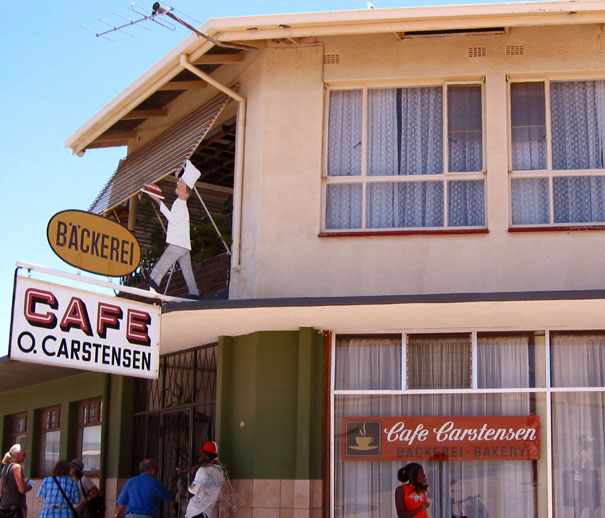
The now-closed Cafe Carstensen in Otjiwarongo, the capital of Otjozondjupa Region in Namibia

- Kapana (grilled meat)
- African cuisine
- List of African cuisines

== Bibliography ==
- Brown, J., 1954. The Thirsty Land, Hodder & Stoughton, London, United Kingdom.
- Van Wyk, B. and Gericke, N., 2000. People's plants: A guide to useful plants of Southern Africa, Briza, Pretoria, South Africa.
- Routledge Encyclopaedia of Africa - Farming
- Wylie, D., 2001. Starving on a Full Stomach: Hunger and the Triumph of Cultural Racism in Modern South Africa, University of Virginia Press, Charlottesville, VA., United States of America.
