= Esther Beukes =

- Other name: Tasha Utjiwa
- Education: University of Namibia Cape Town
- Occupations: Producer, filmmaker, chairperson of the Namibia Film Commission

Esther Beukes (born 13 July 1993), is a Namibian producer, filmmaker and the current chairperson of the Namibia Film Commission (NFC).

== Education and career ==
Beukes started her career at the ages of 16 as a make-up artist for music videos and later moved into wardrobe, production design, casting, assistant directing and a producer. Beukes also studied public relations at the University of Namibia.

Beukes obtained a higher certificate in Television and Film Production from AFDA Cape Town. She also holds a certificate in Film/Cinema/Video studies from Multichoice Talent Factory.

== Achievement ==
Beukes achieved being an assistant director and associate producer on the Zambian telenovela Zuba. She was the writer and director of 2022's award-winning Miss Understood. Beukes was also the director of Mark Mushiva's music film 'Turbo Summation'.

== Filmography ==
- The Unseen (2016)
- Lusala (2019)
- Miss Understood (2022)
