= Tjitji: The Himba Girl =

2015 Namibian short film

Tjitji the Himba girl
- Directed by: Oshosheni Hiveluah
- Written by: Oshosheni Hiveluah
- Produced by: Virginia Witts
- Starring: Uno Kamoruao; Naimbona Licius; Ester Kakoi
- Cinematography: Renier de Bruyn
- Edited by: Robert Scott
- Music by: Christian Polloni & ‘Big Ben’
- Release date: 2014
- Running time: 22 min.
- Country: Namibia
- Languages: Otjihimba; English

Tjitji: The Himba Girl is a 2015 Namibian short film directed by Oshosheni Hiveluah and produced by Virginia Witts. Written by: Sophie Mukenge Kabongo and Audrey Mootseng. The film focuses on the life of Tjijandjeua 'Tjitji', a young, successful and ambitious Himba student who has secret dreams of being the next famous ‘Talk Show Host’. The film has been recognized for breaking stereotypes against women.

The film received positive reviews and won several awards at international film festivals. The film had the nominations in the categories Best Director, Best Original Screenplay, Best Original Music Score, Best Cinematography, and Best Narrative Film at the 2014 Namibian Theater and Film Awards held at the National Theatre of Namibia (NTN). Later, it won awards for cinematography and narrative film at the Namibian Theatre and Film awards in 2014. It received special mention at the Bangalore Short Film Festival in Bangalore, India, in 2015. Tjitji the Himba Girl was also the official short film at the Africa International Film Festival in 2015.

== Plot ==
The movie follows a young Himba girl, Tjitji, who struggles to balance the demands of her traditional culture with her own hopes for a different, more independent future.

== Cast ==
- Uno Kamoruao as Tjitji
- Maoongo Hembinda as Tjitji’s Father
- Tuakara Mutambo as Tjitji’s Mother
- Naimbona Licius as Tamuna (Tamu)
- Ester Kakoi as Verihiva
- Ngunotje Raphael as Lesedi
- Kauna Willem as Bolingo
- Kehitire Daniel as Muasahepi
- Utakara Ndando as Muasahepi’s Father
