= Lukas (2024 film) =

2024 Namibian film

- Directed by: Philippe Talavera
- Written by: Mikiros Garoes
- Produced by: Ombetja Yehinga Organisation
- Starring: Alejandro Cooper Hernandes Goanakgosi Treazurique Titus
- Release date: 1 February 2024
- Running time: 104 minutes
- Country: Namibia
- Language: Afrikaans

Lukas is a 2024 Namibian film directed by Philippe Talavera. The film is based on real-life stories of street children in Windhoek, Namibia, aimed at creating awareness about children who live on the streets. The film stars Alejandro Cooper, who plays young Lukas, Hernandes Goanakgosi, and Treazurique Titus.

The film was first screened at Ster Kinekor, Grove Mall, on 1 February 2024. This was the first Namibian-produced film to be shown in the South African cinema at the Ster Kinekor Rosebank Nouveau as well as at Southgate in Johannesburg.

== Cast ==
The cast of Lukas includes:

- Alejandro Cooper
- Hernandes Goanakgosi
- Treazurique Titus
- Isvaldo Eixab
- Christiano Farmer
- Juanita Ludik
- Justin Tshabalala
- Christian Kariseb
- Dawie Engelbrecht
- Roya Diehl
- Mara Baumgartner
- Lucky Pieters
- Felicity Celento
- Adrian Visagie
- Titus
- Oscar Shikongo
- Sydney Farao

== Production ==
The film is produced by the Ombetja Yehinga Organisation Trust with the support of the Embassy of the Federal Republic of Germany.
