= Andrew Niikondo =

Namibian academic

Pro-vice chancellor (Academic Affairs) of the Namibia University of Science and Technology
- Incumbent
- Assumed office 2011

Vice-chancellor of the Namibia University of Science and Technology (acting)
- In office 19 May 2020 – 31 December 2020
- Preceded by: Morné du Toit
- Succeeded by: Erold Naomab

Personal details
- Born: 15 January 1962 (age 64) Onantsi, Oshana Region
- Party: SWAPO
- Education: Technikon South Africa; University of the Western Cape; University of Uppsala; University of Namibia

Andrew Niikondo (born 15 January 1962) is a Namibian academic. He is the pro-vice-chancellor for academic affairs of the Namibia University of Science and Technology and the chairperson of the think tank of SWAPO.

== Education and early life ==
Niikondo was born on 15 January 1962 in Onantsi near Ondangwa in Ovamboland, today Namibia's Oshana Region. He quit school at the age of 17 in order to join the People's Liberation Army of Namibia (PLAN). He went into Angolan exile and was trained at Lubango. He became an officer of the artillery for PLAN under Epaphras Denga Ndaitwah and only returned to Namibia a decade later. In 2018 Niikondo published a book, Are you a Person or a Ghost?, detailing his experiences in exile. The title refers to his mother's exclamation at his return, not having heard of him in ten years. Speaking at the book launch and remarking on Niikondo's later academic career, Ndaitwah quipped that he was the only [PLAN] commander to have groomed a doctor.

== Academic career ==
Niikondo only continued his formal schooling after Namibian independence and obtained his matric through distance education in 1992. He was 30 at that time. He obtained a first academic degree (a National Diploma) in Public Administration in 1995 from the University of Namibia. He then graduated with a B.Tech from Technikon South Africa in 1999 and a Master's degree, again in Public Administration, from the University of the Western Cape and the University of Uppsala. In 2008 he obtained a PhD in Public Administration from the University of Namibia. Niikondo worked as a part-time lecturer from 2002, and joined the Polytechnic of Namibia (now the Namibia University of Science and Technology) in 2003. After serving as head of the Public Administration department and as deputy dean of the School of Business and Management he became vice-rector of academic affairs and research in 2011.

Niikondo had a difficult time as vice rector. The Polytechnic's founding rector Tjama Tjivikua repeatedly accused him of incompetence, while Niikondo opened grievance procedures against Tjivikua for "harassment, victimisation and discrimination". Plans to split the research portfolio from academic affairs, thereby creating a third vice-rector position, were seen as an attempt to demote Niikondo. With the institution's Council divided on the issue, Niikondo retained his position as vice rector, and when the Polytechnic became a university he assumed office as academic deputy vice-chancellor of the institution. In May 2020 he became acting vice-chancellor, replacing Morné du Toit. He served until the end of 2020, handing over to Erold Naomab.

== Political career ==
Niikondo is a long-term member of SWAPO and was appointed chairperson of it think tank in 2021.
