= Taste of Rain (2012 film) =

2012 Namibian film

- Directed by: Richard Pakleppa
- Written by: Richard Pakleppa
- Produced by: AfricAvenir
- Starring: Nicola Hanekom Grant Swanby Pope Jerrod
- Release date: 13 November 2012
- Running time: 1 hour 22 minutes
- Country: Namibia
- Language: English

Taste of Rain is a 2012 Namibian drama film written and directed by Richard Pakleppa. The film is based on a human drama turning around loss, love, memory, and healing. The film stars Nicola Hanekom as the lead actor, Grant Swanby, a South African actor, and Pope Jerrod.

== Synopsis ==
A story of a woman farmer encountering a severe drought and the discovery of ways to survive in the Namibian desert.

== Cast ==
- Nicola Hanekom as Rachel
- Pope Jerrod as Ray
- Grant Swanby as Tomas
- Frieda Byl as Lena
- David Ndjavera as Shaanika
- Tuli Shityuwete as Dancer
- Sara Gomez as Tuli

== Production ==
The film was written and directed by Richard Pakleppa. The film was produced through AfricAvenir, in cooperation with On Land Productions, the Filmmakers Association of Namibia (FAN) and the Namibia Film Commission (NFC).

== Release ==
The film was released on 13 November 2012 at the National Theater of Namibia (NTN). It was screened as part of the Namibia Film Week’s cycle of screenings of Namibian films preceding the Namibia Theatre and Film Awards 2012.
