= Oshosheni Hiveluah =

Namibian writer, producer, and director (1981–2019)

- Born: 22 October 1981; Luanda, Angola
- Died: 10 October 2019 (aged 37)
- Education: Namibia University of Science and Technology
- Occupations: writer, producer, and director.
- Known for: Tjitji the Himba Girl and 100 Bucks
- Parent(s): Ulitala Monnica Nameuja and Tuli Hiveluah

Oshosheni Hiveluah (22 October 1981 – 10 October 2019) was a Namibian writer, producer, and director. She is best known for the films Tjitji the Himba Girl and 100 Bucks.

== Early life and education ==
Oshosheni was born in Luanda, Angola, on 22 October 1981 to Ulitala Monnica Nameuja and Tuli Hiveluah and was sent to Germany, the former GDR, when she was three years old. Her family returned to Namibia post-independence. Oshosheni completed her secondary school education at the Deutsche Höhere Privatschule in Namibia. She attended the CityVarsity Multi Media School in Cape Town. Oshosheni also studied advanced TV documentary filmmaking under the Fulbright Alumni at the Namibia University of Science and Technology.

== Career ==
Oshosheni's career began with her debut student film Tulila's Fate which won the audience choice award at the Wild Cinema Film Festival in 2004. She founded the Shooting Stars Agency in 2010 and the Windhoek/Harare–based company Digital Afros. She also headed an NGO called Emoona Cultural Foundation.

Oshosheni co-wrote 100 Bucks with Onesmus Shimfaweni. The film focuses on a 100 dollar note that passes through characters in diverse social communities. In 2011, Oshosheni received the Focus Features Africa First program Prize for 100 Bucks. 100 Bucks also won the 2012 Namibian Theatre and Film Audience Choice, Best Director, Best Production Design, Best Screenplay and Best Film awards. 100 Bucks was screened in London by the non-profit organization AfricAvenir Windhoek as well as in New York in 2012 at the African Diaspora International Film Festival (ADIFF).

In 2015, she was listed among the Media Institute of Southern Africa top ten women to watch in media.

Tjitji the Himba Girl is recognized for breaking stereotypes against women. It won awards for cinematography and narrative film at the Namibian Theatre and Film awards in 2014. It received special mention at the Bangalore Short Film Festival in Bangalore, India in 2015. Tjitji the Himba Girl was also the official short film at Africa International Film Festival in 2015.

Oshosheni was a member of the jury at the 2019 Namibia Theater and Film Awards. She is remembered for art exhibitions such as The Evoking Origin and the films Omeva and Cries at Night.

== Death ==
As of her death, she was working on a project titled The Village Tap.

Hiveluah died in Rhino Park Hospital in October 2019 after battling with ill-health for a few years.

== Filmography ==
- Tulila's Fate
- 100 Bucks
- Tjitji the Himba girl
- Omeva
- Cries at Night
- The Village Tap (unfinished)
