= Otjiherero grammar =

Grammar of the Herero language

Otjiherero grammar is the grammar of the Herero language (Otjiherero), a Bantu language spoken primarily in Namibia. It includes several hallmarks of Bantu languages such as a large number of noun classes and the use of subject concords.

== Relevant literature ==
- Kavari, Jekura Uaurika. Omiano vya tjipangandjara: Otjiherero proverbs and idioms. University of Namibia Press, 2013.
- Bryner, Ann; Rose, Tom (2011). Otjiherero: Grammar Manual. Namibia.
