= David Ndjavera =

Namibian actor and director (1969–2021)

- Born: 21 August 1969
- Died: 14 July 2021 (aged 51); Windhoek, Namibia
- Citizenship: Namibia
- Occupations: Actor, film director, university teacher

David Ndjavera (21 August 1969 – 14 July 2021) was a Namibian actor and director, known for Hairareb (2019), Katutura (2015), Salute! (2017) and Just Drive (2014).

== Personal life and death ==
He was married to Helena Ndjavera. He died on 14 July 2021, in Windhoek, Namibia. He was known by many in the theatre and film industry as a theatre educator, award-winning actor, director, and scriptwriter.

== Selected filmography ==
- Hairareb (2019)
- Katutura (2015)
- Just Drive (2014)
- Salute! (2017)
- Taste of Rain (2012)
- Under the hanging tree
