= Tjama Tjivikua =

Namibian academic and businessman

Vice-chancellor of the Namibia University of Science and Technology
- In office 1995 – March 2019
- Preceded by: office established
- Succeeded by: Erold Naomab

Personal details
- Born: 27 July 1958 (age 68) Otjomupanda, Otjozondjupa Region
- Spouse: Neavera Olivier (m. 2015)
- Education: Rockland Community College; Lincoln University; University of Lowell; University of Pittsburgh; Massachusetts Institute of Technology
- Profession: Chemist

Tjama Tjivikua (born 27 July 1958) is a Namibian academic and businessman. He was the Rector of the Polytechnic of Namibia in Windhoek since its inception in 1995. When the institution was renamed into Namibia University of Science and Technology in 2015, Tjivikua continued to lead it, now in the position of vice-chancellor, until March 2019.

== Education and early life ==
Tjivikua was born on 27 July 1958 in Otjomupanda, Otjozondjupa Region. His mother was a nurse and his father a school teacher. He grew up in Oruua in the then Ovitoto Reserve, and started primary school in 1967 at St Barnabas Anglican Church School in Windhoek's Old Location. His family soon moved to Katutura as a result of the forced removal of blacks from Old Location, and he continued his schooling there. After completing high school at Windhoek's Augustineum (1976–1978), Tjivikua worked at the main branch of Barclays Bank (now First National Bank) in Windhoek.

Tjivikua left Namibia in June 1979 to study chemistry in the United States at Rockland Community College (1979–1980) and then Lincoln University (1980–1983), from which he graduated cum laude. He then completed a MSc at University of Lowell and a PhD at University of Pittsburgh and Massachusetts Institute of Technology. His thesis was on molecular recognition in organic chemistry. He was a well recognized researcher at that time, and he worked as assistant professor of chemistry at Lincoln University from 1990 to 1995.

== Professional career ==
In 1995, Tjivikua returned to Namibia to take up the post as founding Rector of Polytechnic of Namibia. When the institution was renamed into Namibia University of Science and Technology in 2015, Tjivikua continued to lead it, now in the position of vice-chancellor, until March 2019. Morne du Toit and Andrew Niikondo were successively appointed in acting position until Erold Naomab was appointed in 2021.

Tjivikua has also served on national bodies such as the National Planning Commission (1998–2006), the Namibia Qualifications Authority (1997–present), the Namibia Council for Higher Education (2006–present) and several others. He has several business interests, including finance, agriculture, and oil.

== Awards ==
- Heroes' Day 2014: Most Distinguished Order of Namibia: Second Class
- 2013: Doctor of Humane Letters (Honoris Causa), Lincoln University (Pennsylvania)
- 2008: Bank Windhoek Business Communicator of the Year
- 2006: FinWeek recognition as one of the 10 most prominent and respected members of the Namibian society
- 2006: D.Sc (Honoris Causa) for exceptional contributions to the development of higher education in Namibia, Worcester Polytechnic Institute (WPI), USA
- 2005: Life Fellow, Centres for Leadership and Public Values, University of Cape Town and Duke University
- 1985: Outstanding Young Man of America
- 1983: American Chemical Society Award, Lincoln University
