= My Father's Son (film) =

2010 Namibian film directed by Joel Haikali

- Directed by: Joel Haikali
- Starring: Patrick Hainghono
- Release dates: October 28, 2010
- Running time: +88 minutes
- Country: Namibia
- Languages: English, Afrikaans, Ovambo

My Father's Son is a 2010 Namibian comedy film directed by Joel Haikali. It stars Panduleni Hailundu, Patrick Hainghono, and Senga Brockerhoff. The film explores the cultural clash between urban and rural lifestyles in Namibia, as well as the relationship between modern and traditional values.

== Plot ==
Ngilifa, a successful businessman from the capital city of Windhoek, returns to his native village in Ovamboland, in northern Namibia, after 21 years of absence. He brings along his sophisticated urban wife, who is of a different ethnic background. They seek out his younger brother, who still lives in the village as a cattle herder, to "free" him from the "backward" traditional life. However, their attempt to persuade him to join them in the city meets with resistance and ridicule from the villagers, who are proud of their customs and heritage. A comedy of culture clash ensues as the film negotiates the relation between the urban worlds of modern Africa and its traditional roots.

== Cast ==
- Panduleni Hailundu as Ngilifa
- Patrick Hainghono as Ngilifa's younger brother
- Senga Brockerhoff as Ngilifa's wife
- Other actors as villagers

== Production ==
The film was produced by Joe Vision Production, a company founded by Joel Haikali, who also wrote and directed the film. The film features dialogue in Oshiwambo, Afrikaans, and English. It was shot in Windhoek and in a rural village in Ovamboland. The film was released in October 2010 in Namibia.

== Reception ==
The film received positive reviews from critics and audiences, who praised its humor, social commentary, and cultural representation. The film was nominated for the Best Feature Film award at the 2011 Namibian Film Awards. The film was also screened at various international film festivals, such as the Pan-African Film Festival, the Durban International Film Festival, and the Africa in Motion Film Festival.
