= Under the Hanging Tree =

2023 film directed by Perivi Katjavivi

- Directed by: Perivi Katjavivi
- Written by: Perivi Katjavivi
- Release date: 2023
- Country: Namibia

Under the Hanging Tree is a 2023 Namibian film directed and written by filmmaker Perivi Katjavivi. The movie explores themes of historical trauma, identity, and cultural displacement, set against the backdrop of Namibia's colonial past. The film became Namibia's first official submission for the Academy Award for Best International Feature on the occasion of the 96th Academy Awards. The film is in German, Afrikaans, Otjiherero, and Khoekhoegowab with English subtitles.

== Plot ==
In Namibia, a dedicated police officer named Christina investigates a murder on a remote farm. As she investigates the case, she gains dark insights into her family's history.

== Cast ==
- Girley Jazama as Christina Mureti
- Dawie Engelbrecht as Hosea Boois
- Royal Diehl as Eva Fischer
- David Ndjavera as Cornelius Kerung
- Petrina Ndjavera as Ndjambi
- Christian Stiebahl as Gustav Fischer
- Andreas Elifas as Bootcall
- David Tsebo Kemba as Eyuva
- Charles Zambwe as Farm Worker #2
- Otja Kambaekua as Farm Worker #1
