= Kukuri (film) =

Namibian film

- Directed by: Philippe Talavera
- Produced by: Ombetja Yehinga Organisation (OYO) Trust
- Release date: 2018
- Running time: 48 minutes
- Country: Namibia
- Language: local languages with English subtitles

Kukuri was produced and edited by Philippe Talavera, Director and founder of Ombetja Yehinga Organisation Trust (OYO). It was nominated at the 7th Africa Magic Viewers Choice Awards for Best Movie, Southern Africa. The producer, OYO, surveyed child marriage, and the team conducted an anonymous interview on girls in the north who had been forced to marry at an early age.

== Synopsis ==
The film follows a young girl from the Kavango region who dreams of becoming a lawyer. Her dreams get shattered when her grandmother starts plotting to get her married to the local bricklayer.

== Released ==
Kukuri was released on 1 December 2018.

== Cast ==
- Hanty Kashongo
- George Antonio
- Mbango Munyima
- Renah Xuexom
- Nangana Mushavanga
- Diyanna Longwani
- Christiaan Haingura Njamba
- Rozalina Wanga.
