= Black Vulcanite =

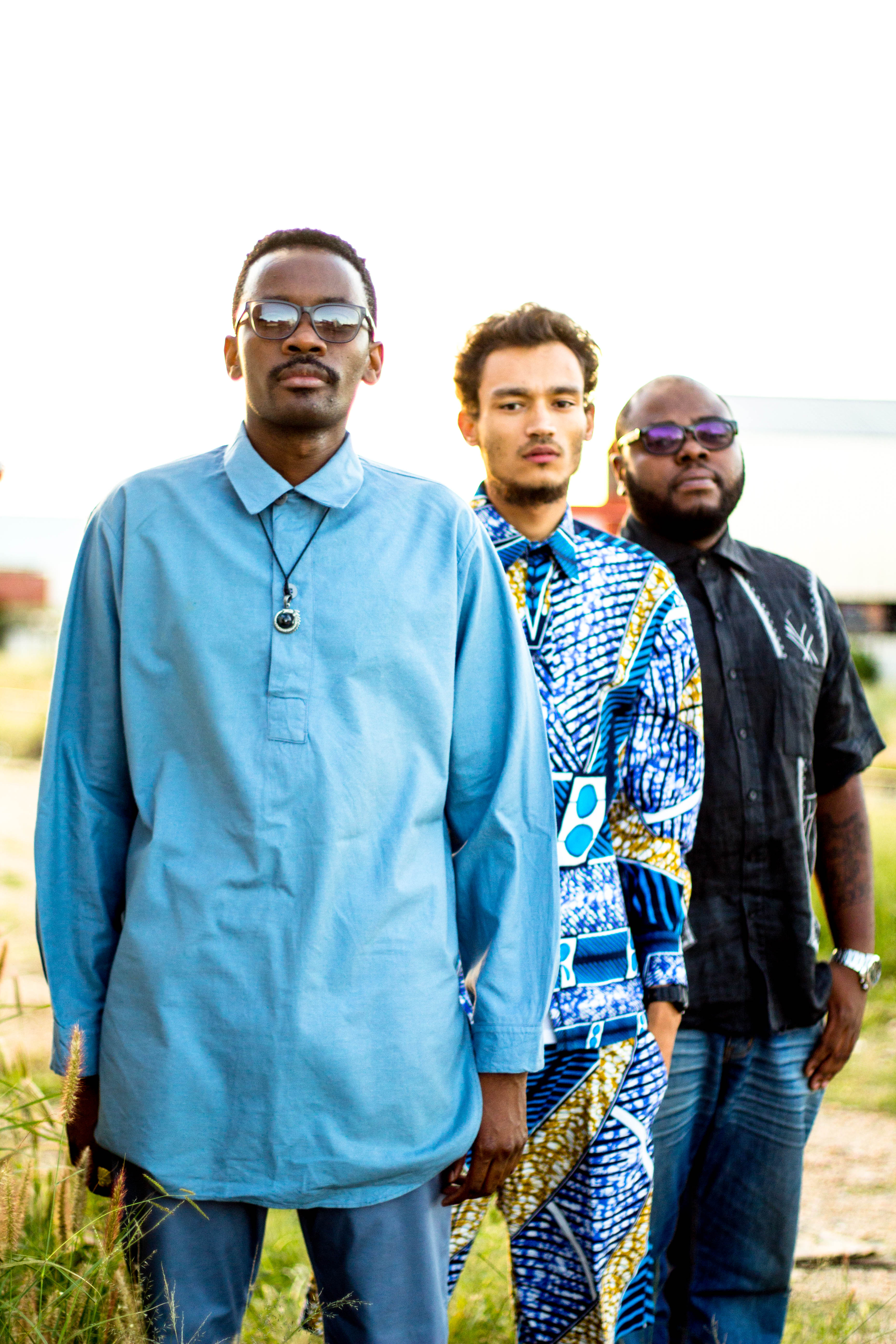
- Band members: Mark Question, AliThatDude, Okin

Background information
- Origin: Windhoek, Namibia
- Genres: Hip hop, Conscious Hip Hop
- Years active: 2001–present
- Labels: Independent
- Members: Mark Question; AlithatDude; Okin

Black Vulcanite is a rap group based in Windhoek, Namibia. The group was formed in 2013 by Mark Question, AlithatDude, and Okin. After they released their EP Remember the future in 2013, the group was featured on OkayAfrica and in the South African Rolling Stone. In 2015 the group won the award for Best Music Video at the Namibia Annual Music Awards (NAMAS). In 2016 they released their debut album, Black Colonialists, which touches on topics like the Herero and Namaqua genocide, African self image, racial injustice and poverty, all through a lens of Afrofuturism. Their approach towards conscious hip-hop has been described as "inspiring and thought-provoking".
