= Joel Haikali =

Namibian film director

- Occupations: Director; film producer; writer

Joel Haikali is a Namibian director, film producer, and writer. He released his first feature film, My Father's Son, in 2011, and has produced several short films, including Differences (2008), African Cowboy (2011), and Try (2012). The aforementioned short films were screened at the Alliance Française in Swakopmund. Haikali previously chaired the Namibia Film Commission.

== Career ==
Joel Haikali is a Namibian filmmaker and has a production company called Joe Vision Production. In 2007, he attended the Pan-African Film Festival in order to make connections and network on behalf of himself and other Namibian filmmakers. His first feature film, My Father's Son, was released in 2011. Its narrative features dialogue in Oshiwambo, Afrikaans and English. The film's cast includes Panduleni Hailundu, Patrick Hainghono and Senga Brockerhoff. AfricAvenir and Franco-Namibian Cultural Centre (FNCC) teamed up to screen My Father's Son in September 2015, at the latter's venue in Windhoek. In an article published by Variety, Haikali spoke at the Berlinale Africa Hub in February 2018 and expressed interest in developing the Namibian industry through collaborative means with foreign counterparts. The Namibia Film Commission, an organization he previously presided over, approved the South Africa-Namibia-Germany co-production title The Girl from Wereldend. His latest works include the feature film PEPE, which won the Silver Bear award at the 2024 Berlin International Film Festival.

== Selected filmography ==
- The World of Today (2004)
- Differences (2008)
- African Cowboy (2011)
- My Father's Son (2011)
- Try (2012)
- Invisibles Kaunapawa (2019)
