= Cecil Moller =

Namibian film director and producer (born 1967)

- Born: 1967 (age 58–59)
- Education: Ramapo College; Chapman University
- Occupations: Film director, film producer
- Years active: 1991-present

Cecil Moller (born 1967) is a Namibian film director and producer.

== Biography ==
Moller was born in Namibia in 1967 and came to the United States to study art. Interested in magical realism, he received his bachelor's degree in communications from Ramapo College. Moller worked as a sound engineer, cinematographer and editor for several productions before directing his own films. He made his film directing debut with No Plot in 1991. It was the first of several feature films he made in the 1990s. In 2000, the Namibian Film Commission Act was passed to promote local film directors such as Moller.

In 2001, Moller explored the lives of prostitutes in Walvis Bay dependent on seasonal shipping trawlers in his award-winning short film House of Love. He wanted to figure out why these women, some of whom he knew from school, had become sex workers. From 2004 to 2007, he served as chairman of the Namibian Film Commission. Moller estimated the Namibia was missing out on 50 percent of the revenue that could come from major international productions in the country like Generation Kill because of the lack of infrastructure.

Moller received his master's degree in film production from Chapman University in 2010. He came out with the short film Marvin and Stevie and God shortly after his graduation. In 2016, Moller co-produced Perivi Katjavivi's first feature film The Unseen, exploring the themes of post-colonial Namibian identity and existentialism. He received the Best Film Director Award at the 2017 Namibian Film & Theatre Awards.

== Filmography ==
- 1991 : No Plot
- 1992 : Culture Shock
- 1992 : Black and White
- 1993 : The Journey (short film)
- 1993 : Drugs and Rock and Roll
- 1995 : Village Square
- 1997 : The Naming
- 2000 : Khomasdal Stories (short film)
- 2001 : House of Love (short film)
- 2005 : Savanna Stories (TV series, two episodes)
- 2009 : Marvin and Stevie and God (short film)
- 2010 : Suburban Superhero (short film)
