= Szél =

Szél is a Hungarian surname. Notable people with the surname include:

- Anna Szél (born 2001), Hungarian freestyle wrestler
- Bernadett Szél (born 1977), Hungarian politician

== See also ==
- Szél (song)
