= Yuri (film) =

2019 Burmese film

- Film Poster
- Burmese: ယူရီ
- Directed by: Arga Thura
- Screenplay by: Arga Thura
- Story by: Arga Thura
- Starring: Aung Myo Win; Wendy Myat Htet Tun; Einnadi Naing; Han Min Htet Kyaw; Ngwe Zin Oo; May Myat Noe
- Cinematography: Marga Thura
- Edited by: Marga Thura
- Music by: Romuld H. Phillips; Miniminers
- Production company: Motivation Gallery
- Distributed by: Motivation Gallery
- Release date: December 12, 2019 (Myanmar)
- Running time: 120 minutes
- Country: Myanmar
- Language: English

Yuri (Burmese: ယူရီ) is a 2019 English language romantic horror film, written and directed by Arga Thura starring Aung Myo Win, Wendy Myat Htet Tun, Einnadi Naing, Han Min Htet Kyaw, Ngwe Zin Oo and May Myat Noe. The film was premiered in Myanmar on December 12, 2019. The sound track of the film released on March 9, 2020.

== Synopsis ==
Yuri is one of the films that responds to young love in a different way from the audience. This film depicts the hardships and love times of the students.

== Cast ==
- Aung Myo Win as Hank
- Wendy Myat Htet Tun as Yuri
- Einnadi Naing as Evelyn
- Han Min Htet Kyaw as Andrew
- May Myat Noe as Jennifer
- Ngwe Zin Oo
