= Ingrid Sinclair =

Zimbabwean director, screenwriter and producer

- Born: Elizabeth Ingrid Sinclair; 1948 (age 77–78); Weston-Super-Mare, England
- Citizenship: Zimbabwe
- Occupations: Director; screenwriter; producer
- Known for: Flame
- Spouse: Simon Bright

Ingrid Sinclair is a director, screenwriter and producer best known for being an important filmmaker of the African Renaissance. She is internationally recognized for her 1996 film, Flame, a drama about the Zimbabwe War of Liberation and her documentaries about Zimbabwe. Flame was chosen for the Director's Fortnight section at the Cannes Film Festival and the Nestor Almendros Award at the Human Rights Watch International Film Festival in New York City.

== Biography ==
Ingrid Sinclar was born in Weston-Super-Mare in 1948. She was raised in Great Britain where she studied Medicine and Literature. Sinclair moved to Zimbabwe in 1985 after starting to work with filmmaker and producer Simon Bright whom she later went on to marry. Sinclair wrote and directed a variety of short films and documentaries in the late eighties and early nineties, exploring themes of equality, culture, history, and the landscape of Zimbabwe. Her short fiction, Riches, was selected for international festivals world-wide and won the coveted City of Venice prize. Ingrid also directed the award-winning documentary Biopiracy: Who Owns Life?, several dance films including Dance Got Me, a moving biography of choreographer Bawren Tavaziva, and festival favourite Africa is a Woman's Name. She is widely considered to be a filmmaker of the African Renaissance

The political situation in Zimbabwe changed dramatically in 2001 with the land reform program. During this time period, "not only the white farmers were purged, but also other notable white people still working in Zimbabwe. It was also during this time that the ideological effort of the regime was intensified, fueling racial hostility". As media laws became increasingly restrictive, the couple decided to move to England.

In 2003, Sinclair and Bright left Zimbabwe and moved to Bristol where they established Afrika Eye Film Festival https://www.afrikaeye.org.uk/ and continue to work in film production.

== Selected filmography ==
=== Flame (1996) ===
Flame is Sinclair's first full-length feature film. It tells the story of two women who join the Zimbabwean Liberation Army to fight for Zimbabwe self-rule. It is the first film to chronicle Zimbabwe's liberation struggle. "It is perhaps the most controversial film ever made in Africa --certainly the only one to be seized by the police during editing on the grounds it was subversive and pornographic. Sinclair's tribute to women fighters in the Zimbabwean liberation struggle aroused the ire of war veterans and the military because it revealed officers sometimes used female recruits as "comfort women." Flame's real crime may have been that it exposed not just past abuses but continuing divisions within Zimbabwean society."

The film was later returned to producers after a global campaign of support. The film eventually passed Zimbabwe censors and became the most successful film of the year in Zimbabwe. Flame was selected for the Director's Fortnight section at the 1996 Cannes Film Festival. The film won numerous awards worldwide including Grand Prize at the Annonay International Film Festival in France, the jury award for best film at the 1998 International Women's Film Festival in Turenne, and the Nestor Alemendros award at the Human Rights Watch International Film Festival in New York

=== Tides of Gold (1998) ===
The film Tides of Gold (1998) is a documentary which illustrates the history of the 1000-year-old trading network which dominated southern and eastern Africa, linking the region to distant places including China and Indonesia.

=== Riches (2002) ===
Riches is a short film which tells the story of a black teacher and her son from apartheid South Africa who move to an isolated village in Zimbabwe and the challenges they encounter.

=== Africa is a Woman's Name (2009) ===
Africa is a Woman's Name is a trilogy of three dramas about of the lives of three women in three African countries directed by three African women. "Amai Rose, a Zimbabwean housewife and businesswoman, Phuti Ragophala, a dedicated school principal in one of South Africa's poorest communities, and Njoki Ndung’u, a human rights attorney and member of Kenya's parliament, tell their individual stories, reflecting upon their own achievements and failures as well as needed initiatives for women and children in their respective societies". The film was co-directed with Wanjiru Kinyanjui from Zimbabwe and Bridget Pickering from South Africa.

Year	Film	Role	Notes
2011	Robert Mugabe... What Happened?	Screenwriter	Nominate Best Documentary, South African Film and Television Awards
2009	Africa is a Woman's Name	Director and screenwriter	Segment Amai Rosie
2002	Mama Africa	Director	Segment Riches
2001	Riches	Director	Milan Venice Prize: African Film Festival Milan
1998	Tides of Gold	Director	Winner Best Documentary Film Southern African Film Festival
1996	Flame	Director and screenwriter	Winner Human Rights Watch International Film Festival (1997); Golden Camera Nominee Cannes Film Festival 1996
1991	Bird from Another World (short)	Director	Documentary, Winner African Film Festival
1989	Limpopo Line	Co-director with Simon Bright	Documentary
