= Krischka Stoffels =

Namibian-British filmmaker

- Born: Krischka Stoffels; Windhoek, Namibia
- Occupations: Director, writer, screen writer, cinematographer, editor
- Years active: 2006–present

Krischka Stoffels is a Namibian filmmaker. Krischka has made several critically acclaimed films including Gesie in die glas and Tjiraa. Apart from direction, she is also a producer, writer, cinematographer and editor.

== Personal life ==
She was born in Windhoek, Namibia.

== Career ==
In 2010, she made her maiden short, Gesie in die glas, which won the Special Mention Award at the Namibian Film and Theater Awards. With the success, she made her second short Tjiraa. The film follows Vezuva, a young Ovaherero woman who returns from her studies abroad, in Germany, only to discover that her married cousin has died, and that according to tradition, she is expected to marry her cousin's widower. The film was financed by the Namibia Film Commission and was selected for screening at multiple international film festivals, including the African Diaspora International Film Festival.

== Filmography ==
Year	Film	Role	Genre	Ref.
2006	Climbing Kilimanjaro	Editor	Documentary	
2007	Desert Soul	Editor	TV series	
2008	The Shop	Editor	Short film	
2010	Gesie in die glas	Director, producer, writer, cinematographer, editor	Short film	
2012	Tjiraa	Director	Short film	
2014	Coming Home	Co-writer	Short film	
