= Namibia University of Science and Technology =

Institute of tertiary education in Windhoek, Namibia

- Other name: NUST
- Motto in English: Technology and development
- Type: Public university
- Established: 1994; 32 years ago
- Chancellor: Peter Katjavivi
- Vice-Chancellor: Frednard Gideon
- Faculty: ≥300
- Administrative staff: 670 (including faculty)
- Students: 10,500
- Location: Windhoek, Khomas Region, Namibia; 22°36′40″S 17°03′27″E
- Website: www.nust.na

The Namibia University of Science and Technology (NUST), formerly known as Polytechnic of Namibia, is a public university located in the city of Windhoek, Namibia.

NUST was headed by the founding vice-chancellor Tjama Tjivikua from 1995 until 2019. The current vice-chancelor is Frednard Gideon. The largely ceremonial role of chancellor of the university is held by Peter Katjavivi.

== History ==
It emerged from the Academy for Tertiary Education, founded in 1980, which was the first institution of higher education in the Republic of Namibia. Act 9 of 1985 of the South African administration defined three sections for this academy, a university part, the College of Out-of-School Training (COST) for vocational training programs and the Technikon Namibia for technical programs related to science and technology. When in 1992 the University of Namibia (UNAM) was founded, the academy lost its university section. The remaining sections, COST and Technikon, were merged to form the Polytechnic of Namibia per Act of Parliament 33 / 1994. The founding council and rector Tjama Tjivikua were appointed in July 1995. In 2015 the Polytechnic was renamed to the Namibia University of Science and Technology (NUST), again per Act of Parliament, as the 1994 Act prescribed the name "Polytechnic of Namibia".

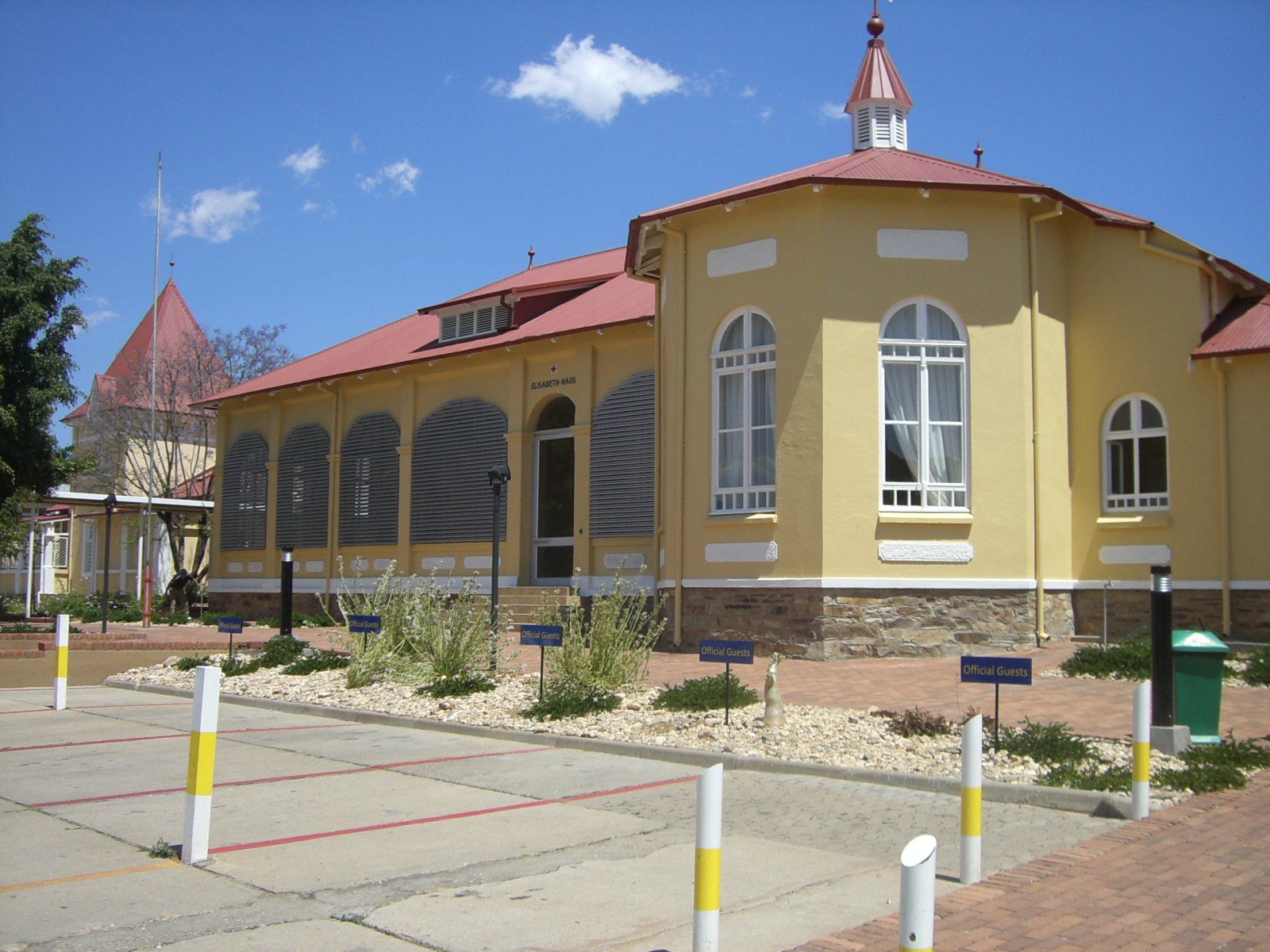
Elisabeth house on NUST's main campus

The Namibia University of Science and Technology consists of two campuses and a number of scattered former residential buildings all located in the Windhoek West suburb close to the city centre. The main campus consists of the structures originally erected for the Academy for Tertiary Education. At its center is the Elisabeth house, Windhoek's former obstetric hospital designed by Wilhelm Sander in 1907. Elisabeth house is a national monument since 1986 and houses the Senate chambers and the office of the Vice-Chancellor.

The Engineering campus is adjacent to the main campus; construction of this area started in 1995. Originally intended to house only the School of Engineering, this campus has gradually grown and accommodates the library, all auditoria, and many of the other faculty venues, including, most recently, a new building for the School of Health Sciences. A further building, to house new lecture venues and the Department of Architecture and also a new library for the maters and PHD students, is currently being constructed on this campus.

== Academic and vocational offerings ==
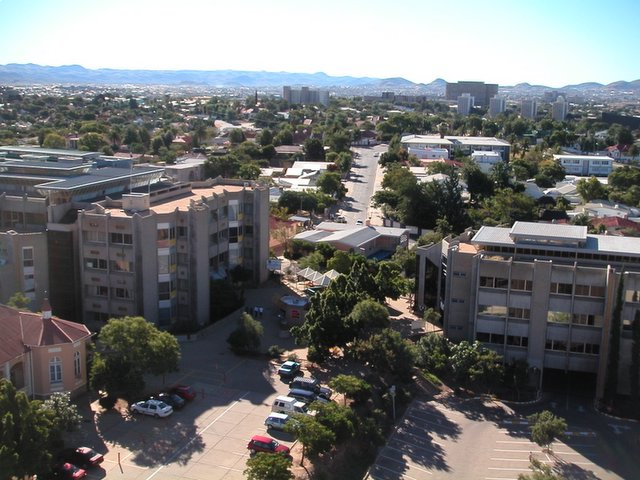
NUST main campus

Until the 2010s a classic polytechnic, the institution offered both higher-level vocational training and academic degrees in technical subjects and the applied sciences. In many cases these programs could be combined such that the academic degree could be attempted after a more basic vocational training was successfully passed. Since gaining university status in 2015 several Master and PhD programs have been developed, and short, entry-level certifications have been phased out.

The Namibia University of Science and Technology comprises six academic faculties and offers undergraduate as well as postgraduate degrees in the areas of business and management, engineering, information technology, journalism, hospitality, natural resource management, and medicine. As of 2010 there were 86 undergraduate and 19 postgraduate degrees offered at the institution. The university now also offers master's degree courses. A Centre of Excellence in Information Technology (CEIT) has also been set up.

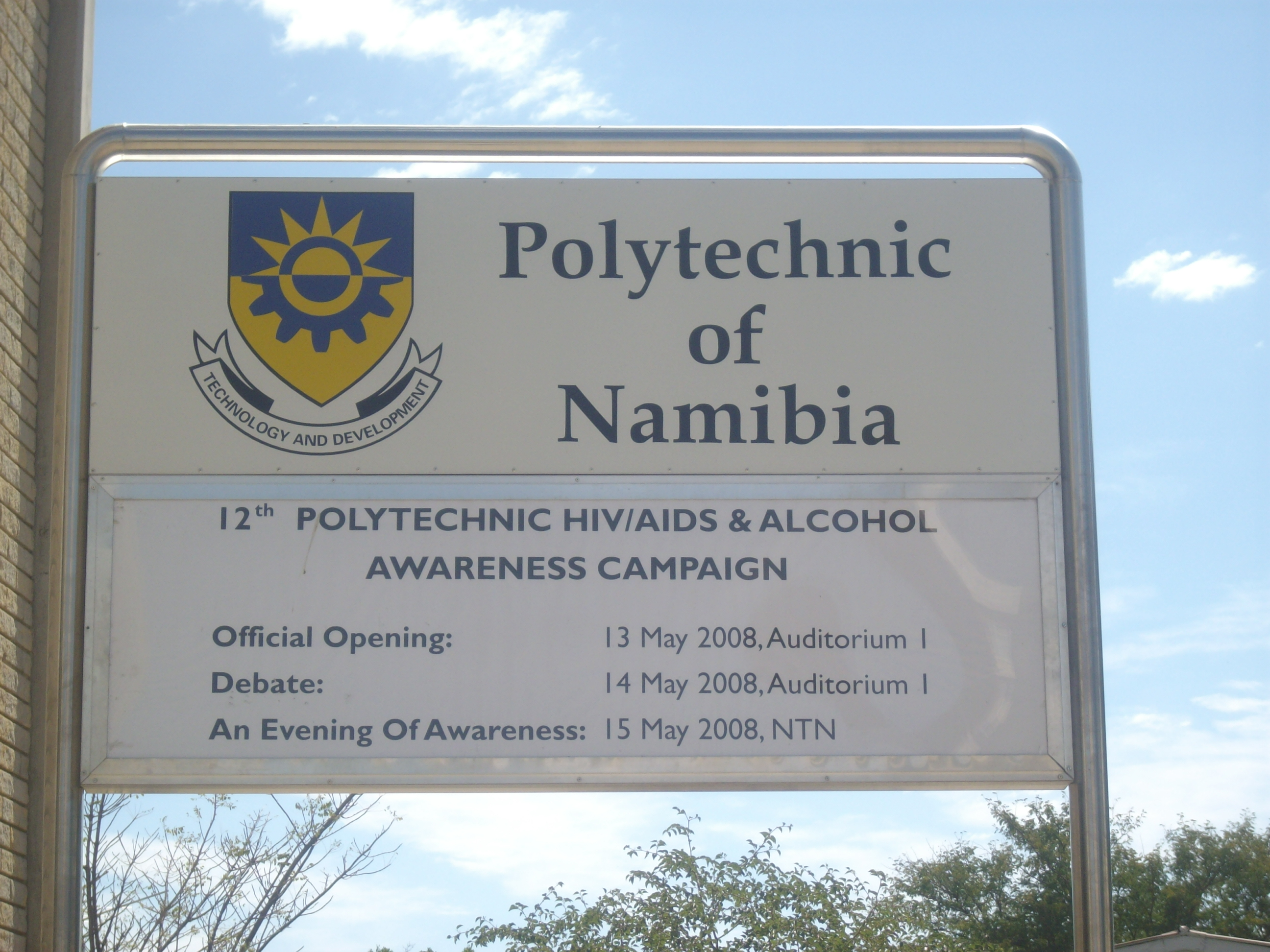
A sign at the then Polytechnic of Namibia with the old logo in 2008

== Competition with the University of Namibia ==
NUST has been in constant competition with Namibia's other state-owned university, the University of Namibia (UNAM). University rankings consistently list both institutions among Africa's Top-50, until 2009 usually with UNAM a few places ahead of NUST. In recent years NUST has been ahead of UNAM; the Webometrics 2013 lists it on rank 28 in Africa (2,284 globally), and UNAM on rank 48 (3,160).

On the local level, judging service and contributions to the Namibian economy, NUST usually tops all other educational institutions. In 2010 the argument about who delivers the best tertiary education in Namibia entered a new stage when a local study found the NUST again to be far ahead in terms of services delivery. This study has subsequently been rejected by the Students' Representative Council of UNAM but endorsed by NUST management staff.

== Naming controversy ==
The Polytechnic of Namibia had for a number of years attempted to change its name and its mandate to that of a Namibian University of Science and Technology. The institution intermittently adopted the name on its web site and in much of its official communication. This, however, was against the law that established the institution. In August 2010, the motion was stopped by cabinet, stating upcoming overall changes to the Namibian education sector as the reason to decline the name change.

More than two years later in December 2012, cabinet instructed the Ministry of Education to grant the Polytechnic of Namibia university status and a change to the desired name. Part of the transition process was the phasing out of one-year Diploma and one-semester Certificate courses within five years. In 2015 the new act was gazetted and the name change became official.

== Events ==
The institution conducts a cultural festival every year at the onset of spring. Activities include an International Cuisine Day where staff and students prepare and sell traditional food, a flea market, and the Miss and Mr NUST competition.

NUST has an Internet radio station called NustFM.

== Staff ==
=== University leadership ===
The largely ceremonial role of chancellor of the university is held by Peter Katjavivi.

NUST was headed by the founding vice-chancellor Tjama Tjivikua from 1995 until March 2019. After several consecutive acting vive-chancellor appointments of Morné Du Toit in 2019 and Andrew Niikondo in 2020, Erold Naomab was appointed vice-chancellor in January 2021. Naomab served five years and was again succeeded by Niikondo in an acting position. In August 2026 Frednard Gideon was appointed as substantial vice-chancellor.

=== Notable staff ===
- Anicia Peters, the pro-vice-chancellor for research, innovation and development at the University of Namibia, former dean of computing and informatics at NUST

== Notable alumni ==
- Hendrik Gaobaeb, President of the United Democratic Front, graduated with a Diploma in Public Administration in 2000
- Sam Nujoma, first president of Namibia, received a doctorate honoris causa in public management in 2005
- Harold Pupkewitz, entrepreneur, received a doctorate honoris causa in business management in 2011
- Erastus Uutoni, Minister of Sport, Youth and National Service of Namibia, holds a Diploma in Police Science and a Certificate in Marketing from NUST
