= Richard Pakleppa =

Namibian film director

- Born: 1961 (age 64–65); Namibia
- Education: African studies, University of Cape Town
- Alma mater: University of Cape Town
- Occupations: Screenwriter, film director, producer
- Notable work: Dying for Gold

Richard Pakleppa (born 1961) is a Namibian screenwriter, film director, and film producer.

== Education and Career ==
Pakleppa studied philosophy and theatre in Munich, Germany, and gained an Honours Degree in African studies from the University of Cape Town. Since 1990, he has directed and produced documentary and fiction films across Southern Africa. He currently lives in South Africa. In the year 2000, Pakleppa was awarded the Best Documentary Award of the Southern African Film Festival. He has also been the founding member and Director of Land Productions since 1992.

== Filmography ==
Year	Film	Role	Genre	Ref.
2005	The Strongest Heart	Director, Writer	Documentary	
2006	Angola: Saudades from the One Who Loves You	Director, Writer	Documentary	
2009	Three an half lives	Drimer	Drama	
2012	Taste of Rain	Director, Writer	Drama	
2013	Jogo de Corpo. Capaeira e Ancestralidade	Director	Documentary, Biography	
2014	Paths to Freedom	Director	Short film	
2016	Dying for Gold	Director	Documentary	

== Writing ==
- '40,000 workers stay away in Namibia', South Africa Labour Bulletin, Vol. 13, No. 6, 1988, pp. 15–23
