= Jane Katjavivi =

Namibian writer and publisher (1952–2022)

- Born: 1952; Leeds, England
- Died: 9 August 2022
- Education: University of Birmingham and University of Sussex
- Occupations: Author, editor, publisher
- Spouse: Peter Katjavivi (1981–2022)

Rosemary Jane Tuauana Katjavivi (1952 – 9 August 2022) was an English-born Namibian author, publisher and editor.

Katjavivi worked with the South West Africa People's Organisation (SWAPO) in London, and was centrally involved in Namibian publishing organizations and institutions. She is credited with an "outstanding role" in helping to develop publishing in the Namibian language and preserve Namibian literature. She made it possible for Namibians to read important works that could not have been published or legally read under the Apartheid regime. Her papers are stored in the National Archives of Namibia.

== Life in England ==
Jane Katjavivi was born in Leeds, northern England. As a young girl she joined a church charity working in support of underdeveloped nations. She then studied Literature and African Studies at University of Sussex, which led her to be in contact with African students and inspired her to be an activist against Apartheid in Southern Africa. She did a master's degree at the University of Birmingham, where she specialized in African studies. Her thesis is titled South Africa Subimperialism.

Jane Katjavivi's first job was a scholarship officer at a scholarship charity in London at World University Services in 1975. While she was at this position she managed to raise funds for Southern African students who were deprived their rights to education because of their race or political affiliation. Namibians benefitting from this charity include Jackson Kaujeua and Bishop Colin Winter.

She worked as an information officer for SWAPO in London between 1976 and 1978, She also worked as a journalist and a copy editor in London. In 1981, she married Peter Katjavivi, a SWAPO politician and historian.

== Life in Namibia ==
Katjavivi moved to Namibia in 1989 or 1990 and became a naturalized Namibian. She adopted the Otjiherero name "Tuauana", meaning in English “we are one or we are united”.

Following Namibia's Independence in 1990 she established New Namibia Books, a publishing house. For ten years it facilitated in publishing Namibian writings. From 2011 to 2016, Katjavivi was the founding publisher of the University of Namibia Press. Her editing works include peer-reviewed books in areas such as language and culture, public policy and law, history and memory politics and autobiography. On her retirement in 2016 she was succeeded at UNAM Press by Jill Kinahan.

As an editor and publisher, Katjavivi significantly contributed to Namibia's literary heritage. She made it possible for Namibians to read important works that would have been unpublished or suppressed under the Apartheid regime. As a result, they "could liberate their minds and in turn, liberate themselves from the sense of inferiority which was forced upon them by the racist policies of the then South African government”.

Katjavivi was a founding chairperson of other organizations including the Association of Namibian Publishers and the Namibia Book Development Council. She was the Southern African Representative on the board of the African Publishers Network. She was also a member of the African Books Collective Management Committee.

Jane Katjavivi was also the author of the book Undisciplined Heart and of other short stories. Undisciplined Heart has been described as a thanatographical memoir, for the frequency with which it addresses themes of illness, pain, and death.

In addition to her publishing and writing, Katjavivi supported environmental and wildlife initiatives. In 1992, she was a Founding Board Member of the Cheetah Conservation Fund (CCF), based in Otjiwarongo, Namibia. She later served as the Vice Chair of CCF in Namibia. From 1999 onwards, she supported the CCF's Livestock Guarding Dog program.

== Death ==
Katjavivi died on 9 August 2022 while en route to Windhoek, Namibia with her husband. They were returning from a visit to the United Kingdom. In extending condolences to her family, Namibian President Hage Geingob stated “After independence in 1990, as an accomplished author and passionate editor, Jane was instrumental in building Namibian literature.”
