= Ombetja Yehinga Organisation Trust =

Namibian welfare organisation

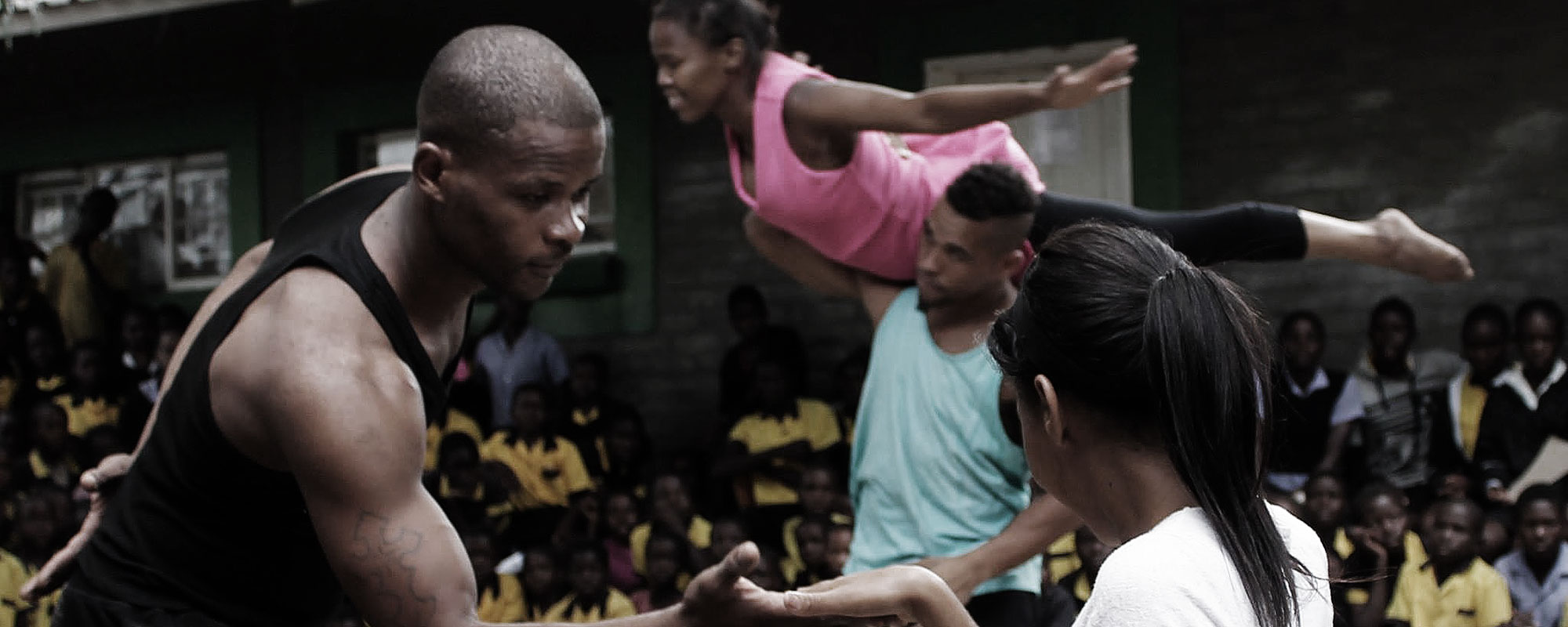

Ombetja Yehinga Organisation (OYO) is a Namibian welfare organisation founded in December 2002 and launched in March 2003. It uses visual and performing arts to raise awareness and address social challenges such as HIV/AIDS, domestic violence, rape , and substance abuse among the youth in Namibia. The vision is to create a society in which there is broad Access to information and the arts, creating skills and making informed choices through young people motivating themselves,

== Background ==
OYO originated from the Kunene Regional Council, where teachers in 2000 sought help to include HIV/AIDS education in schools. This led to the launch of the Ombetja Yehinga programme in January 2001 under the Regional HIV/AIDS Coordinating Committee (RACOC). Due to its success, the programme was extended in 2002 and later registered with the Ministry of Health and Social Services as an NGO. Guided by the slogan "Using the arts with young people to create social awareness," OYO expanded its reach in 2003 by establishing a head office in Windhoek and regional offices in the Erongo and Kunene regions. OYO employs various initiatives, including youth-friendly magazines and a dance group that showcases story-driven performances to empower, raise awareness and educate the youth.

== Actors ==
Mary Jane Andreas

Desmund Kamerika

Joe Nakapela

Sydney Farao

Sophia Janser

Jeffrey Ndjahera

George Williams

Carlos Kusange

Chris Mouton

Ethen Philander

Frankie van Schalkwyk

Vincent k. Mboku

== OYO Films ==
The following are films produced by the Ombetja Yehinga Organisation Trust (OYO): Panado Girl, Kukuri , Kapana Now that I can talk about it, Pap and Milk, My Best Interest, Salute!, and Lukas (2024 film).

== OYO Dance Troupe ==
The OYO dance troupe is one of the branches in the Ombetja Yehinga Organisation Trust. It was created in 2008. The group uses contemporary dance and physical theatre to raise social awareness amongst young people on issues such as HIV/AIDS, Stigma, teenage pregnancy, corrective rape and gender based violence.

== OYO Youth Groups ==
Since 2006, OYO has worked with unemployed, out-of-school youth, training them in theatre, dancing and singing. In 2017, OYO supported youth groups in Ohangwena, Omaheke , Karas and Khomas Region respectively, with the support of Embassy of Finland, Horizon and UNAIDS.
