= Kapana (grilled meat) =

Namibian grilled beef

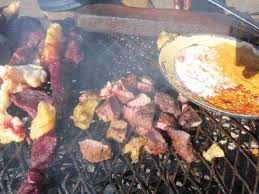
Kapana on the grill

Kapana is a way of preparing raw meat, typically beef, in Namibia by grilling it on an open fire. The grilled meat is often sold at stalls in open markets; it is cut into small pieces and grilled and sold while it is cooking. There are often many people selling it at one place, so the price is usually negotiable. Kapana business has contributed in a small way to the economic development of the country by giving unemployed young people an opportunity to start their business with a very low capital and look after their family. The township of Katutura in Windhoek is known for its kapana.

== Preparation ==
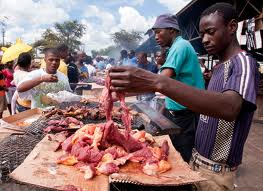
Kapana being prepared

A metal plate is welded into a grill stand with a flat top and the wood burns under it. The Kapana men (as they are called, although a few women also make their living this way), cut the raw meat with a machete into smaller pieces, and prepare the "salsa" with onions, tomatoes, white vinegar, canola oil, and "kapana" spice, a specialty blend of spices. When the top is hot enough, the meat is placed on the grill, cooked for roughly 5-10 minutes depending on cut of meat. Kapana meat is most commonly beef, but can be used with other red meat such as game meats. Kapana is eaten with the aforementioned salsa, and Vetkoek or more commonly known as "junkies", yeast risen fried dough balls.

== Culture ==
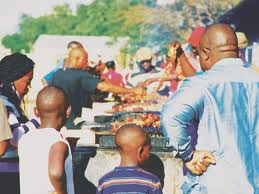
Customers awaiting Kapana

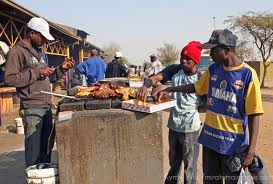
Customers enjoying fresh Kapana

Kapana is inexpensive to buy and fast to cook. The area around the Kapana stand is regarded as a social place, meeting new people of varying economic backgrounds while enjoying the lunch. Although most people could grill beef at home, many prefer to go and eat Kapana while having conversation and making new friends.

Kapana traders compete noisily for customers, each shouting and claiming that his meat is the best cooked.

In 2014, a drought in Namibia meant that the farms that traditionally provided meat to the Kapana men could not keep up with the demand. Kapana meat had to be shipped from afar, increasing the price and making it difficult for the men to make a profit.

== See also ==
- Barbecue
- Namibian cuisine
- African cuisine
- List of African cuisines
