= Bridget Pickering =

Namibian film producer

- Born: 1966 (age 59–60)
- Education: Syracuse University
- Occupations: film maker and producer
- Father: Arthur Pickering

Bridget Pickering (born 1966) is a film maker and producer from Namibia. Her producing credits include Hotel Rwanda (2004), The March of the White Elephants (2016), Liyana (2017), The Tale (2018), and Under The Hanging Tree (2023), Namibia's submission for Best International Feature at the 96th Academy Awards. She is the daughter of Namibian diplomat and trade unionist Advocate Arthur Pickering.

She attended college at Syracuse University in the United States and worked for Universal Pictures before returning to Namibia. Her father is Namibian and her mother from South Africa. In 1999, she was one of six women chosen to direct a short film for the Mama Africa series. Her contribution, Uno's World, is about a young woman dealing with an unplanned pregnancy.
