= Perivi Katjavivi =

Namibian-British filmmaker

- Born: Perivi John Katjavivi; 22 January 1984 (age 42); Oxford, England
- Education: Columbia College Hollywood; University of Cape Town; University of the Western Cape
- Occupations: Director, writer, screen writer, cinematographer, editor
- Years active: 2008–present
- Height: 5 ft 9 in (175 cm)
- Parents: Peter Katjavivi (father); Jane Katjavivi (mother)
- Website: https://perivikatjavivi.com

Perivi John Katjavivi is a Namibian-British filmmaker. He has made several critically acclaimed films including Eembwiti, The Unseen, and Film Festival Film. Apart from direction, he is also a producer, writer, camera operator, actor, cinematographer and editor. Perivi holds a BA in Cinema from Columbia College, Hollywood in Los Angeles, and an MA in African Cinema from UCT.

== Personal life ==
Katjavivi was born in Oxford, England, and has five siblings. His father Peter Katjavivi is a Namibian politician and diplomat, currently the speaker of the National Assembly of Namibia, his mother is Briton Jane Katjavivi.

Katjavivi grew up in Windhoek, the capital of Namibia. He studied film at Columbia College in Los Angeles where he obtained a BA. He holds an MA in African Cinema from the University of Cape Town.

== Career ==
In 2016, Katjavivi made his maiden feature film The Unseen. The film was screened at several film festivals including Busan, in competition at Durban. The film won the award for Best Film at Innsbruck in Austria as well. In 2019, he produced the short Film Festival Film and was co-directed with Mpumelelo Mcata. The film had its World Premiere at the 69th Berlinale in February 2019.

Apart from cinema, he has also written extensively for the Windhoek Observer, Africa is a Country, and OkayAfrica. Katjavivi also contends that aside of being any kind of genre film, ‘Under the Hanging Tree’ offers a unique and arguably unseen window into a contemporary Namibia still grappling with its colonial ghosts.

== Filmography ==
Year	Film	Role	Genre	Ref.
2008	The Shop	Director	Short film	
2009	Love Is...	Director, producer	Short film	
2011	Eembwiti	Director	Short film	
2012	100 Bucks	Actor: Nolan	Short film	
2012	My Beautiful Nightmare	Director, writer, producer, camera operator, cinematographer, editor	Short film	
2016	Uushimba (City-Life)	Writer	Short film	
2016	The Unseen	Director, writer, producer	Feature film	
2018	Emoyeni: Nsanguluko	Director	TV Mini-Series	
2019	Film Festival Film	Director, producer, camera operator, additional editor	Feature film	
2023	Under the Hanging Tree	Director, writer, producer	Feature film	
