= Namibia Film Commission =

Namibia Film Commission (NFC) is a Namibia government agency formed to support, encourage and promote the development of the film industry in Namibia. It was established by Act No.6 of Parliament in 2000 under the Ministry of Information, Communication and Technology in Namibia.

== Functions and responsibilities ==
The Namibia Film Commission functions and responsibilities are anchored on the following thematic areas that includes:

- Film development
- Economic growth
- Training and capacity building
- Promotion and marketing
- Partnership and collaboration
- Film funding
- Locations and facilities
- Co-production and international collaboration
- Film regulation and incentives
- Film festivals and events
- Film archives and preservation
- Film education and awareness.

== The Board ==
The Board is appointed by the Minister of Information and Communication Technology. The current board was appointed by Minister Emma Theofelus effective 1 December 2024. The appointment came after the Minister blocked the appointments of two commissioners on grounds that they previously served on the board.

The current board comprises

- Esther Beukes: Chairperson
- Reagan Malumo: Vice Chairperson
- Ronald James: Commissioner
- Iyaloo Hamunyela: Commissioner
- Ilalion Muha: Commissioner
