= List of Damelin people =

This is a comprehensive list of all notable alumni and faculty (past and present) of Damelin.

== Alumni ==
Name	Field of expertise	Notability	References
Lionel Abrahams	Literature	Late South African novelist, poet, editor, critic, essayist and publisher	
Daniel Buys	Music	Idols competitor and finalist	
Michael Kitso Dingake	Politics, Literature	member of the ANC, SACP and MK; author and columnist	
Beauty Dlulane	Politics	ANC politician	
Nicole Flint	Radio/Television, Modelling	Miss South Africa 2009	
John Fourie	Sport	South African professional golfer	
Gift Gwe	Music	Idols competitor and finalist	
Nkosiphendule Kolisile	Politics	Late member of the ANC and SACP	
Basetsana Kumalo	Business	Chair & CEO of Basetsana Woman Investment Holdings	
Sindiwe Magona	Literature	Writer	
Mninwa Mahlangu	Politics	Chairperson for the National Council of Provinces and ANC politician	
Dumisani Meslane	Sport	South African rugby union player, currently playing with the SWD Eagles	
Abdul Milazi	Literature, Music	Motivational speaker, life coach, poet, author, musician and entrepreneur	
Nosipho Mngomezulu	Music	Idols competitor and finalist	
Tim Modise	Journalism, Radio/Television	South African journalist, TV and radio presenter currently presenting for SAfm	
Murphy Morobe	Business	Anti-apartheid Activist and CEO of Kagiso Media	
Thabiso "Boki" Ntsime	Music	Idols competitor and finalist	
David Nosworthy	Sport	Former Proteas cricketer	
Cyril Ramaphosa	Politics	ANC politician	
Clive Rice	Sport	Former Proteas cricketer	
Solly Shoke	Military, politics	General of the South African Army and chief of the South African National Defence Force	
Emile Smith	Sport	Olympic field hockey player for South Africa	
Nomakhwezi (Khwezi) Hani		Late daughter of Chris Hani	
Zunaid Bulbulia	Business	ex-CEO of MTN South Africa	
Sifiso Mzobe	Literature	Award winning author	
Lerato Kganyago	Modelling	Miss Soweto 2002	
Mobi Dixon (Mabi Ntuli)	Music	DJ and music producer	
Rosie Motene	Literature	Actress, author, film producer and activist	
Nomgcobo Jiba	Law	ex-Deputy National Director of Public Prosecutions	
Bess Nkabinde	Law	ex-Constitutional Court judge	

== Faculty and staff ==
Name	Field of expertise	Position in Damelin	Years of service	Notability	References
RJ Benjamin	Music	Head vocal coach at Bramley campus	2001-2007	Popular musician	
Frederick John Harris	N/A	Lecturer at Johannesburg campus	Circa 1965	South African executed for anti-Apartheid bombing	
Themba Maseko	Management	Managing director of the Damelin Education group	2000-2001	Businessman	
Benjamin Damelin	Education	Founder		Founder of Damelin in 1943	
Johann Brummer	Education	Teacher, Managing director	1951-1998	Founder of Damelin Correspondence College in 1955	
Mark Pilgrim	Television	Television course lecturer at Centurion and Johannesburg campuses		Television and radio personality	
Cecil Skotnes	Art	Head of the art department	1965	Painter	
