= Damelin =

Private college in South Africa

Damelin (Pty) Ltd
- Type: Private
- Established: 1943; 83 years ago
- Parent institution: Educor
- Affiliations: UMALUSI; UNISA; CompTIA; CAA; IMM; IBS; ICB; IATA; PMI
- Endowment: No data available
- Chancellor: Prof. Paul Beard
- Students: 4,012 (2022)
- Location: South Africa
- Campus: 6 campuses across South Africa
- Language: English
- Colours: Blue & gold
- Website: www.damelin.co.za

Damelin (officially Damelin Pty Ltd) is a private South African tertiary education institution founded in 1943. It has 6 campuses in South Africa and is owned by Educor (the Education Investment Corporation Limited) group.

The institution offers degrees, diplomas, and other higher qualifications. Damelin is the oldest education subsidiary owned by Educor.

In January 2026, the South African Department of Higher Education stated issued a Notice of Intent to Cancel the registration of Damelin, City Varsity, and ICESA City Campus, due to their consistently being unable to fulfil their mandates.

== History ==
Damelin was established in 1943 by Benjamin Damelin.

In 1951, Johann Brummer joined Damelin as a teacher, becoming a partner in 1952, and serving as Educor's Executive Chairman until his resignation in 1998. One of the key aspects in the development of the Damelin name was initiated in 1952 when Brummer started developing materials for long-distance learning, which later became the Damelin Correspondence College in 1955.

In the early 1960s, Damelin began offering evening classes at what would later become their Johannesburg Campus . In 1968, the Damelin Management School was established and offered education and training to adults for the attainment of Damelin certificates. In the 1970s, many of the prisoners imprisoned on Robben Island were registered as students of Damelin. In 1985, the Damelin Computer School, which only offered part-time programs at the time, was established in Johannesburg.

By 1991, Damelin had started offering contact instruction to University of South Africa students, which had been established for middle-class African students who were unable to gain entry into universities of higher prestige with higher level education. All these programs were coordinated at the same Johannesburg site for many years until 1993, when the Braamfontein Campus was founded. In 1998, the University of Pretoria approached the Damelin Computer School to facilitate the computer training of residential students of the University of Pretoria on their main campus because their IT faculty was better suited to training undergraduates than the University of Pretoria's.

By 2005, Damelin was the only institution in Southern Africa whose Bachelor of Commerce degrees were recognized by the Oxford Brookes University, a university established in 1992. In 2007, Damelin aligned their programs with the National Qualifications Framework (NQF) and by 2008, Damelin was offering more than 200 NQF programs. In 2008, Educor was purchased by National Pride Trading 452 as a going concern and started integrating the Damelin School of Banking and Insurance's academic operations as part of their offerings.

By November 2012, over one million students had graduated from Damelin.

In 2013, Pacofs signed a three-year contract with Damelin for the training of audio engineers.

In October 2013, the Damelin Gaborone campus cut its ties with Damelin South Africa and renamed itself.

From November 2013, as part of an initiative in the South African education sector called Project Athena, South African telecommunication company Telkom pledged to give over 40,000 SIM cards to Damelin students over the course of three months. In the next phase of the project, free Wi-Fi access was set to be implemented across select Damelin campuses for students to use.

In March 2024, the South African Department of Higher Education and Training said that Damelin, along with other Educor-owned educational institutions Icesa City Campus, Lyceum College, and City Varsity, had failed to meet their mandates. The department said the institutions had failed to submit their annual financial statements and tax clearance certificates for the 2021 and 2022 financial years, as proof of their financial viability.

Furthermore, the department said there had been daily complaints from students that went unresolved, including those related to poor quality of teaching, lack of proper administrative support, poorly qualified staff, corruption and bribery, a lack of response for requests for refunds, a lack of professionalism, exploitation of poor students, as well as non-payment and under-payment of staff salaries.

The department also stated that the institutions had misrepresented their enrolment numbers. At the time, Educor had claimed the total number of students was 50,000, but the department confirmed it was actually 13,096.

Educor was given a period in which to phase out pipeline students, and was instructed to reimburse students where such was due. Subsequently, a remedial deadline was set for 6 June 2025.

In January 2026, as a result of Damelin, City Varsity, and ICESA City Campus continuously being unable to fulfil their mandates, the Department of Higher Education and Training issued a Notice of Intent to Cancel the institutions' registrations.

== Campuses ==
Damelin has 6 campuses across South Africa in various cities, including but not limited to Johannesburg, Port Elizabeth, Pretoria, Cape Town, Durban.

All of the current campuses are situated within South Africa's borders in five of South Africa's nine provinces: Gauteng, Kwa-Zulu Natal and Western Cape, the first of which was established in the 1960s in Johannesburg, Gauteng.

== Faculties, departments and schools ==
Damelin has various faculties, departments and schools, namely:

- Faculty of Commerce, Leisure and Information Technology: The Faculty of Commerce, Leisure and Information Technology specializes in accounting, ICT, and travel and tourism. The qualifications in the Faculty range from certificates to diplomas and Bachelor of Commerce degrees. The Diploma in Information Technology, which carries 360 credits with an NQF rating of 6, is more affordable than similar courses offered by the University of the Witwatersrand, Rhodes University and the University of Pretoria.
- Faculty of Management Sciences and Communication: The Faculty of Management Sciences and Communication specializes in various professional fields such as journalism, public relations, human resources management, marketing and business management with various diplomas and a Bachelor of Commerce degree on offer.
- Faculty of Creative Arts: The Faculty of Creative Arts specializes in the fields of graphic design, photography and various audio technologies.
- School of Business, Management and Corporate Training: The School of Business, Management and Corporate Training caters for students who are interested in studying business related subjects that include courses like general finance and public relations. The School of Business, Management and Corporate Training is one of the best 1000 business schools in the world.
- School of Media and Design Technology: The School of Media and Design Technology is the largest full-time school in Damelin with a selection of 13 programmes offered over a range of creative media, design and performing art disciplines. The School of Media and Design Technology offers courses in fashion design, interior design, presenting and digital photography. Sound Engineering is offered as part of the School of Media and Design Technology at the Bramley campus.
- School of Information Technology: The School of Information Technology caters for students by providing a variety of computer related programmes to them.
- School of Engineering: The School of Engineering offers various qualifications in the field of engineering, including diplomas in chemical engineering, civil engineering, mechanical engineering and electrical engineering.
- School of Management and Humanities: The School of Management and Humanities offers diplomas across various disciplines, such as tourism, management and public relations.
- School of Leisure and Lifestyle: The School of Leisure and Lifestyle caters to students interested in a wide variety of career paths in various fields, such as game ranging and hotel management.
- School of Banking and Insurance: The School of Banking and Insurance, which was founded in 1993 in Johannesburg, is a specialist division of Damelin that deals with banking and insurance as well as other financial professions. The School of Banking and Insurance's courses are offered at the Braamfontein and Pretoria City campuses. The School of Banking and Insurance has been involved in the Adult Basic Education and Training programme which aims to improve the education of adults.
- Department of Business Management: The Department of Business Management specializes in various fields of business and offers a range of certificates in accounting, business management and public administration.
- Department of Media and Communication: The Department of Media and Communication offers two certificates specializing in journalism and public relations respectively.
- Department of Information Technology: The Department of Information Technology offers a single certificate, specializing in the principles of information technology.
- Department of Tourism and Event Management: The Department of Tourism and Event Management offers one qualification: a certificate specializing in travel and tourism.
- Centre of Excellence: The Centre of Excellence is a division of Damelin that offers a range of diplomas to prospective students.

== Awards and accolades ==
In 2005 a survey conducted by Markinor amongst a sample of fifty recruitment agents revealed that individuals who studied at Damelin and attained their qualifications there were more likely to be hired than individuals educated elsewhere due to the fact that Damelin's qualifications satisfy both the vocational and the professional requirements of both the marketplace and students.

Damelin's various campuses have varying degrees of the PMR.africa award that serve to recognize the high standard of education offered by the award recipient. The Cape Town city campus was awarded with a Silver Arrow award on 22 April 2013 for their hard work and excellence in the category "College/Institutions for Higher Education". Damelin Kwa-Zulu Natal (all the Damelin campuses in the province) won a Silver Arrow award in the category "Colleges/Training Institutions" on 14 October 2013.

== Community interaction ==
On 13 February 1997, then South African President Nelson Mandela delivered a speech at the Damelin business college in Johannesburg.

In 2007, Damelin partnered with Ocean Experience to promote the safe use of oceans.

Since 2009, Damelin has been the title sponsor for the annual Damelin Rugby Night Series, which is a high school rugby tournament for boys' teams.

Damelin is known for giving away many bursaries to members of the public.

In March 2013, hundreds of students from Damelin's Durban City campus took to the streets to express their support against rape and violence against women.

== Notable people ==
=== Faculty and staff ===
- Frederick John Harris, South African executed for anti-apartheid bombing, lecturer at the Johannesburg campus prior to his death in 1965
- Themba Maseko, managing director of Damelin 2000–2001
- Mark Pilgrim, television presenter and lecturer at the Johannesburg and Centurion sites for the Television Course

=== Alumni ===
- Lionel Abrahams, late South African novelist, poet, editor, critic, essayist and publisher
- John Antonakis, Professor, Faculty of Business and Economics, University of Lausanne, Switzerland, author
- Michael Kitso Dingake, member of the ANC, SACP and MK, author and columnist
- Nicole Flint, Miss South Africa 2009 and television/radio personality
- Basetsana Kumalo, Chair and CEO of Basetsana Woman Investment Holdings
- Mninwa Mahlangu, Chairperson for the National Council of Provinces and ANC politician
- Dumisani Meslane, South African rugby union player, playing with the SWD Eagles
- Tim Modise, South African journalist, TV and radio presenter for SAfm
- David Nosworthy, former South African international cricketer
- Cyril Ramaphosa, ANC politician, 5th president of South Africa
- Clive Rice, former South African international cricketer
- Solly Shoke, general of the South African Army and chief of the South African National Defence Force
- Damelin Short Learning Programs. sainfoweb.co.za.

== Controversy ==
On 9 September 2012, the investigative journalism program Carte Blanche aired a feature called "Arrested Development" in which the legitimacy of Damelin's qualifications was questioned. Damelin was quick to set the record straight and address the issue and even Debora Patta was quoted as saying "Damelin has a good name and is a trusted brand."
