= CityVarsity =

Private higher education institution in South Africa

- Established: 1996
- Parent institution: Educor
- Location: South Africa
- Website: cityvarsity.co.za

CityVarsity School of Media and Creative Arts is a private higher education institution in South Africa. It falls under Educor and offers full-time, short, and online degrees, diplomas, and certificates in the creative arts and media.

Campuses opened in Cape Town and Johannesburg. The latter closed in 2024. In 2026, the South African Department of Higher Education issued a Notice of Intent to deregister Educator-owned institutions including CityVarsity and Damelin for failure to fulfill their mandates.

== History ==
Seeking to provide creative arts and media career training and education, Rob Gray founded CityVarsity in Cape Town in 1996. Rob collaborated with John Lazarus who owned the building in Kloof street, Cape Town. Later, it was officially registered as Private Higher Education Institution with the Department of Higher Education and Training in 1997 and accredited by the Council on Higher Education. The second campus in Johannesburg opened in 2007. The Cape Town campus moved from Park & Kloof Street to Roeland Street in 2014. CityVarsity saw an increase in international students over the duration of its existence.

Weeks into the 2024 academic year, the Johannesburg campus suddenly ceased operations.

== Courses and student life ==
CityVarsity offered a variety of courses including Animation, Journalism, Professional Acting and many more. Students would take on work experience during their studies.

Bachelor of Arts:

- Film and Television
- Professional Acting for Camera
- Sound and Music Technology

Diploma:

- Animation
- Film and Television Production Techniques
- Multimedia Design and Production
- Professional Acting for Camera
- Professional Photography
- Sound Engineering

Certificate:

- Acting for Camera
- Art Direction
- Digital Media Arts
- Motion Picture Make-up
- New Media Development

Short programmes:

- Acting for Camera 1
- Basic Photography
- Camerawork and Lighting
- Creative Writing
- Digital Video Editing
- Directing
- Graphic Design and Digital Media
- Introduction to DSLR Filming
- Music Production
- Scriptwriting
- Short Video Production
- Sound Design and Post Production
- TV Presenting
- Vocal Training for Radio

== Notable people ==
- Gérard Rudolf, head of drama 1998–2002

=== Alumni ===
- Garth Breytenbach
- Clint Brink
- Joe Daly
- Oshosheni Hiveluah
- Mapaseka Koetle-Nyokong
- Elvira Lind
- Mamarumo Marokane
- Michael Matthews
- Bongo Mbutuma
- Tariro Mnangagwa
- Clarence Peters
- Meganne Young
- Marlin Van Noie
