= Educor =

South African education company

Coordinates: 29.8379°S 30.9990°E

Educor Holdings (Pty) Ltd
- Type: Subsidiary
- Industry: Private tertiary education
- Founded: 1996; 30 years ago
- Headquarters: Pinetown, KwaZulu-Natal, South Africa
- Area served: South Africa
- Services: Education
- Parent: National Pride Trading 452 (Pty) Ltd
- Subsidiaries: Damelin; Damelin Correspondence College; CityVarsity; ICESA City Campus; Lyceum College; Intec College; Durban Central Technical College
- Website: educor.co.za

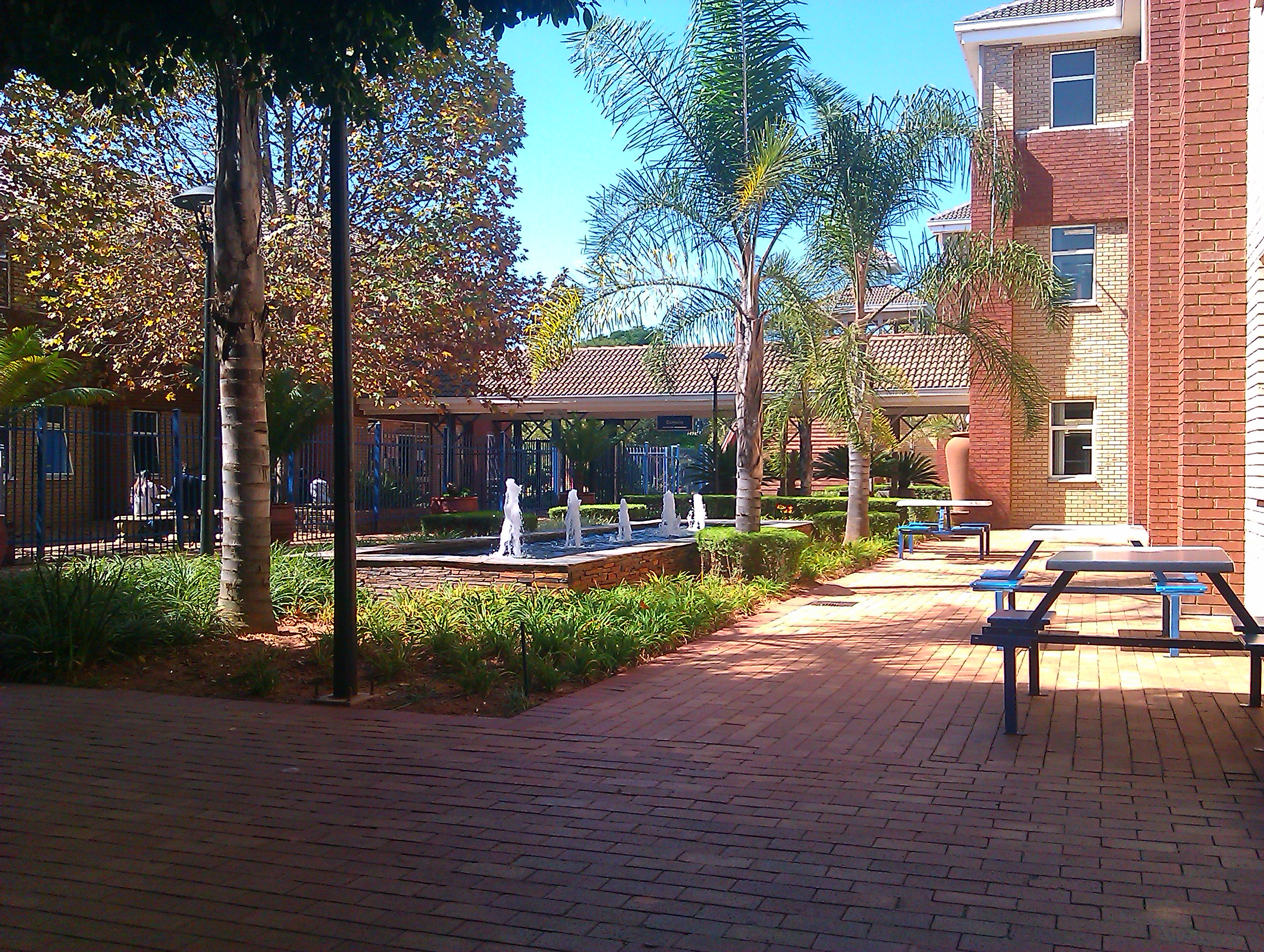
The entrance to Damelin's Randburg campus

Educor (officially Education Holdings Pty Ltd) is a South African holding company that owns multiple private tertiary education institutions, multiple of which have been deregistered by the South African Department of Higher Education and Training for continuously failing to meet their mandates.

== Operations ==
Educor owns the following private tertiary education institutions:

- Damelin (deregistered by the South African government)
- CityVarsity (deregistered by the South African government)
- ICESA City Campus (deregistered by the South African government)
- Damelin Correspondence College (deregistered by the South African government)
- Lyceum College (deregistered by the South African government)
- Intec College
- Durban Central Technical College

== History ==
Educor was established in 1996, when the Housewares Group bought educational institutions Damelin and Midrand College. In June of the same year, Educor was listed on the JSE Limited, South Africa's largest stock exchange.

In January 2008, Educor was purchased from Media 24 by National Pride Trading 452 (Pty) Ltd.

In January 2026, as a result of Damelin, City Varsity, and ICESA City Campus continuously being unable to fulfil their mandates, the South African Department of Higher Education and Training issued a Notice of Intent to Cancel the institutions' registrations.
