= Miss Namibia 2022 =

27th edition of Miss Namibia pageant

- Date: August 12, 2022
- Presenters: Michelle McLean; Adriano Visage; Franklin Shitaleni
- Entertainment: Kp Illest
- Venue: Windhoek Country Club Resort, Windhoek, Namibia
- Broadcaster: NBC
- Entrants: 12
- Winner: Cassia Sharpley; Windhoek

Miss Namibia 2022 is the 27th edition of Miss Namibia pageant that was held on August 12 2022. At the end of the event, Chelsi Shikongo crowned Cassia Sharpley as her successor. Sharpley represented Namibia in Miss Universe 2022.

== Results ==
Color key

- : Declared as Winner
- : Ended as runner-up or top 5/6 qualification
- : Ended as one of the finalists or semifinalists
- : Ended as special awards winner

Final result	Contestant	International placement
Miss Namibia 2022	Windhoek – Cassia Sharpley	Unplaced – Miss Universe 2022
1st Runner-up	Swakopmund – Leoné Renate Van Jaarsveld	Unplaced – Miss World 2022
2nd Runner-up	Windhoek – Diana Andimba	Top 20 – Miss Earth 2022
Top 5	Tsumeb – Nongee Faye Kandjii; Windhoek – Ashleigh Kleintjes	

== Contestants ==
12 contestants competed for the title:

Contestant	Age	Represented	Ref.
Aina Kweyo	26	Oniipa	
Ashleigh Kleintjes	24	Windhoek	
Cassia Sharpley	21	Windhoek	
Diana Andimba	23	Windhoek	
Elizabeth Namoloh	23	Windhoek	
Leoné Renate Van Jaarsveld	26	Swakopmund	
Lilly Shihepo	26	Onamutanda Village	
Michelle Mukuve	22	Rundu	
Nongee Faye Kandjii	26	Tsumeb	
Uetuesa Zaire	22	Windhoek	
Zawady Tjijombo	21	Opuwo	
Zhahida Tanigu Tjizera	25	Witvlei	

== Judges ==
=== Finals ===
- McBright Kavari – Designer
- Helena Kandjumbwa – Founder of New Elementary Namibia
- Maguire Mulder – Commercial and Trade Marketing manager at Coca-Cola Namibia
- Dr. Esperance Luvindao – Medical Doctor
- Gerine Hoff – Editor of the Windhoek Express
