= List of colleges in South Africa =

South Africa has a number of colleges. There two types of public colleges in South Africa, public and private colleges. All accredited colleges must be registered. Public and private colleges are registered by the Department of Higher Education and Training but only private colleges can be registered by Umalusi.

There are two types of public colleges: Further Education and Training (FET) and Technical and Vocational Education and Training (TVET) colleges. South Africa's youth, especially those in rural areas and townships tend to enroll at colleges at they are more accessible, affordable and they focus on practical learning.

== List of Public Colleges ==
=== List of FET Colleges ===
1. 1st Choice Varsity College of South Africa
2. Abakholwe Community Developers (NB: Declined)
3. Abcone
4. About Learning
5. Academy Business School
6. Academy International
7. Academy of Advanced Technology
8. Academy of Learning SA
9. Academy of Sound Engineering
10. Access Education and Training
11. Accord Business Academy
12. Action Training Academy
13. Adaptive Corporate Systems
14. Advtech Resourcing
15. Aether Training (NB: Declined)
16. AFM Home for the Elderly
17. Africa Competency Development
18. Africa Institute of Management and Technology
19. African Global Skills Academy
20. African Learning and Development Academy
21. African Renaissance College and Business Consultants
22. African Union Skills Development
23. Afrilink Leisuretainment
24. Agon Training
25. Amasundu Academy
26. Anchor-Lite College SA
27. ARWYP Medical Centre
28. Ashleigh Erin Foundation
29. Assurance College of Business and Information Technology
30. Tjheseho Community Skills Development Centre
31. B B Access
32. Bamaketse Academy of Fashion and Entrepreneur Design
33. Better Best Educational Projects
34. BHP Billiton Energy Coal South Africa
35. Bibette Clothing Manufacturers
36. Birnam Business College
37. Blueprint Future Skills Development
38. Bluff Improvement Centre
39. Boston Administrative Services
40. Boston City Campus and Business College
41. Boston School of Finance
42. Braitex-Tensilon
43. British American Tobacco South Africa
44. Bushbuckridge Technical College for Further Education and Training
45. Bytes People Solutions
46. Candy Nxusani Trading
47. Cape Business College
48. Cape Guide Training
49. Cape Town Baptist Seminary
50. Cape Training College
51. Capsicum Culinary Studio
52. Capstone 528
53. Centre for Creative Education
54. Chatsmed Candlelight Nursing School
55. Chedy Empowerment Services
56. Chemical Initiatives
57. Chili Pepper Information Technology Solutions
58. Christina Martin School of Food and Wine
59. Cida Training
60. Colliery Training College
61. Columbus Commercial College
62. Comficor Professional Development
63. Competency International SA (Withdrawn)
64. Computer Datamotion School of SA
65. Concept Interactive (Cape)
66. Constrauction Industrie Education and Training Services
67. Creative Foundation Trust
68. CRL Beauty School
69. Crossley Holdings
70. CTU Training Solutions
71. Damelin
72. Dano Textile Industries
73. DCC Campus FET Institution
74. Delcom Training Institute
75. Denver Technical College of South Africa
76. Derlon Spinning
77. Desto
78. Dionysus Skills Development Initiative
79. Ditasa
80. Durban Computer Tech
81. Durban South Training Trust
82. Durbuscol
83. Dyna Training
84. Eaglesvale College
85. Eastern Cape Technical and Commercial College
86. Ebuhleni Training Solutions
87. Ebus-Tech Consulting
88. ED-U Options Academy
89. Educol Training
90. Educon Business College (Pretoria)
91. Edusa College
92. Edutak Pre-School Training and Development
93. Edutel Services Company
94. Edutel Skills Development
95. Edutel Wholesale and Retail Academy
96. Ekufundeni Training School
97. Elderberry Investments 53
98. Emendy
99. Emmanuels Staffing Services
100. Empumelelweni
101. Training Centre
102. Enterprise for Learning Resources and Materials
103. Entrepreneurial Business School
104. Entrepreneurs Survival Solutions

=== List of TVET Colleges ===
1. Boland TVET College
2. Buffalo City TVET College
3. Capricorn TVET College
4. Central Johannesburg TVET College
5. Coastal TVET College
6. College of Cape Town for TVET
7. Ehlanzeni TVET College
8. Eastcape Midlands TVET College
9. Ehlanzeni TVET College
10. Ekurhuleni East TVET College
11. Ekurhuleni West TVET College
12. Elangeni TVET College
13. Esayidi TVET College
14. False Bay TVET College
15. Flavius Mareka TVET College
16. Gert Sibande TVET College
17. Goldfields TVET College
18. Ikhala TVET College
19. Ingwe TVET College
20. King Hintsa TVET College
21. King Sabata Dalindyebo TVET College
22. Lephalale TVET College
23. Letaba TVET College
24. Lovedale TVET College
25. Majuba TVET College
26. Maluti TVET College
27. Mnambithi TVET College
28. Mopani South TVET College
29. Motheo TVET College
30. Mthashana TVET College
31. Nkangala TVET College
32. Northern Cape Rural TVET College
33. Northern Cape Urban TVET College
34. Northlink TVET College
35. Orbit TVET College
36. Port Elizabeth TVET College
37. Sedibeng TVET College
38. Sekhukhune TVET College
39. South Cape TVET College
40. South West Gauteng TVET College
41. Taletso TVET College
42. Thekwini TVET College
43. Tshwane North TVET College
44. Tshwane South TVET College
45. Umfolozi TVET College
46. Umgungundlovu TVET College
47. Vhembe TVET College
48. Vuselela TVET College
49. Waterberg TVET College
50. West Coast TVET College
51. Western College for TVET

== Top TVET colleges by Province ==
=== Eastern Cape ===
1. Buffalo City TVET College
2. Eastcape Midlands TVET College
3. Lovedale TVET College

=== Free State Province ===
1. Flavius Mareka TVET College
2. Goldfields TVET College
3. Motheo TVET College

North west

1. Vuselela TVET College

=== Gauteng Province ===
1. Central Johannesburg TVET College
2. Ekurhuleni West TVET College
3. Tshwane North TVET College

=== KwaZulu-Natal Province ===
1. Coastal TVET College
2. Elangeni TVET College
3. Thekwini TVET College

=== Limpopo Province ===
1. Capricorn TVET College
2. Lephalale TVET College
3. Sekhukhune TVET College

== List of Private Colleges ==
1. Abakholwe Community Developers
2. Academic Institute Of Excellence (Pty) Ltd
3. Academy At Vaal Triangle
4. Academy Of Training And Development
5. Advisor Progressive College
6. Africa Skills Training Solutions (Pty) Ltd
7. Aranda Learnership College
8. Baal-Perazim Fet College (Pty) Ltd
9. Be Competent Training Institute
10. Bhekubanzi Business Enterprise
11. Blacken Group
12. Bolton Business College And Computer Studies
13. Central Technical College (Pty) Ltd
14. Central Technical College - Cape Town
15. Centurion Academy - Rustenburg
16. Centurion Akademie (Pty) Ltd
17. Centurion Akademie - Klerksdorp
18. Centurion Akademie - Rustenburg
19. Churchil Technical College (Pty) Ltd
20. Circle Way Training – Belfast
21. Circle Way Training - Kriel
22. Ctu Training Solutions - Menlyn Pretoria
23. Curro Holdings
24. Curro Holdings Ltd (Midrand)
25. Curro Holdings Ltd (Rivonia)
26. Dam Technical College
27. Damelin (Pty) Ltd
28. Damelin Port Elizabeth
29. Denver Technical College
30. Divoh Technical College
31. Ekurhuleni Computer College
32. Engineering Technology Academy
33. Gauteng City College
34. Gauteng College Of Engineering And Technology
35. Germiston Fet College
36. Growth Path Projects (Pty) Ltd
37. Icalc Training Academy (Pty) Ltd
38. Ikage Sd College
39. Immaculate College Of Commerce & Engineering
40. Imra Technology Academy
41. Innovatus Fet College (Pty) Ltd
42. Jeppe College Of Commerce And Computer Studies
43. Jfa Square Technical Training Institution Npc
44. Kingsway College Of Computing And Business Studies
45. Kwadukuza Technical College
46. Life Prep College (Pty) Ltd
47. Madzahisi College
48. Management And Leadership Academy
49. Mechatronics Development Academy
50. Mtech Mega College
51. Nasor College
52. Natedstudiessouthafrica (Pty) Ltd
53. Natedstudiessouthafrica - Tzaneen
54. Ncm Computer And Business Academy
55. Northern Technical College
56. Optimi College (Pty) Ltd
57. Overcomers Training College
58. Oxbridge Academy (Pty) Ltd
59. Pax Commercial College
60. Polokwane Technology Institute
61. Qualitas Career Academy (Pty) Ltd
62. Qualitas Career Academy – Newcastle
63. Rand Training College (Pty) Ltd
64. Revine Technical College
65. Richedzani Engineering Fet College And Training Center (Pty) Ltd
66. Richfield Graduate Institute Of Technology (Pty) Ltd
67. Rostec Technical Fet College (Pty) Ltd
68. Rostec Technical Fet College - Bloemfontein
69. Rostec Technical Fet College (Pty) Ltd - Gauteng
70. Rostec Technical Fet College - Johannesburg
71. Rostec Technical Fet College (Pty) Ltd - Limpopo
72. Saj Competency Training Institute
73. Samancor Chrome (Pty) Limited
74. Shakaland Technical College
75. Springfield Fet College (Pty) Ltd
76. Springfield Fet College (Pty) Ltd - Kempton Park
77. Technicol Sa College (Pty) Ltd
78. Tekmation Training Institute
79. Thasululo Technical College
80. Thekwini City College
81. Thekwini City College - Kwadukuza
82. Thekwini City College - Pietermaritzburg
83. Tlharihani Training Centre
84. Umbilo Private Technical College
85. Vaal Technical Institute
86. Vaal Technical Institute - Klerksdorp
87. Varsity Institute Of Science And Technology
88. Wamalloy Engineering College Pty Ltd
89. Watersrand Computer And Business College
90. White River Technical College
91. Whitestone College - Bloemfontein
92. Whitestone College - Klerksdorp
93. Zurel Bros Sa
94. Zurel Bros Sa - Station Campus
