= Miss Namibia =

Beauty pageant

- Miss Namibia Organization
- Formation: 1980; 46 years ago
- Founder: Nic Kruger
- Type: Beauty pageant
- Headquarters: Windhoek
- Location: Namibia
- Members: Miss Universe; Miss World; Miss Earth; Miss Supranational; Miss Charm
- Official language: English
- National Director: Conny Maritz
- Website: www.missnamibia.org/home

Miss Namibia is a national Beauty pageant in Namibia. The winner represents Namibia at Miss Universe pageant.

The organization of Miss Namibia has produced one Miss Universe. Michelle McLean was crowned Miss Universe 1992, and became the first Namibian woman to win the title. McLean had been crowned Miss Namibia 1991 before Miss Universe, and also placed as the fourth runner-up at Miss World 1991. In addition, Umbi Karuaihe Upi has been the miss Namibia Chief Executive Officer for 35 years and she ended this career in 2026.

== History ==
The first Miss Namibia contest was held in 1980 by Nic Kruger, the founder of the pageant. After that there are three national directors: Nic Kruger (1980–1996), Danie Botes (1997–1998) and Conny Maritz (1999–today). The first Miss Namibia was organised by the Afrikaans newspaper Die Republikein in 1980 and conducted by Nic Kruger, the founding director of the pageant. The winner Desèré Kotze was allowed to participate in the Miss Universe contest representing Namibia, but wore the South African flag. After that there are two further national directors: Nic Kruger (1980–1996), Danie Botes (1997–1998) and Conny Maritz (1999–today). According to the source from Glynis Fester (Miss RSA 1977)—the first Miss SWA-Namibia was Ann Parker who was crowned by her on 18 June 1977. This is on public record in the Rapport published on 19 June 1977. She did not go to any international pageants.

== Titles ==
Number of wins under Miss Namibia
Pageant	Wins
Miss Universe	1
Miss World	0
Miss Earth	0
Miss Charm	0

Note that the year designates the time Miss Namibia has acquired that particular pageant franchise.

== Titleholders ==
Year	Miss Namibia	Region
1980	Bernice Tembo	Khomas
1981	Antoinette Knoetze	Erongo
1982	Desere Kotze	Khomas
1983	Astrid Klotzch	Khomas
1984	Peta Harley-Peters	Khomas
1985	Alice Pfeiffer	Khomas
1986	Jo-Rina Meyer	Oshikoto
1987	Bianca Pragt	Khomas
1988	Caroline du Preez	Khomas
1989	Emsie Esterhuizen	Khomas
1990	Ronel Liebenberg	Khomas
1991	Michelle McLean; Miss Universe 1992	Khomas
1992	Anja Schroeder	Khomas
1993	Barbara Kahatjipara	Khomas
1995	Patricia Burt	Khomas
1996	Faghma Absalom	Khomas
1997	Sheya Shipanga	Khomas
1998	Retha Reinders	Khomas
1999	Vaanda Katjuongua	Khomas
2000	Mia de Klerk	Khomas
2001	Michelle Heita	Khomas
2002	Ndapewa Alfons	Kavango East
2003	Petrina Thomas	ǁKharas
2004	Adele Basson	Khomas
2005	Leefa Shiikwa (Note: Miss Namibia 2005, Leefa Shiikwa was stripped of her title after it was disclosed that she was married to an Angolan man.)	Khomas
2006	Anna Svetlana Nashandi	Khomas
2007	Marichen Luiperth	Erongo
2008	Marelize Robberts	Khomas
2009	Happie Ntelamo	Zambezi
2010	Odile Gertze	Khomas
2011	Luzaan van Wyk	Khomas
2012	Tsakana Nkandih	Oshikoto
2013	Paulina Malulu	Khomas
2014	Brumhilda Ochs	Otjozondjupa
2015	Steffi Van Wyk	Khomas
2016	Lizelle Esterhuizen	Khomas
2017	Suné January	Hardap
2018	Selma Kamanya	Khomas
2019	Nadja Breytenbach	Khomas
2021	Chelsi Shikongo	Erongo
2022	Cassia Sharpley	Khomas
2023	Jameela Uiras	Khomas
2024	Prisca Anyolo	Khomas
2025	Johanna Swartbooi	Kharas
2026	Charene Labuschagne	Khomas

=== Wins by region ===
Region	Titles	Years
Khomas	32	1980, 1982, 1983, 1984, 1985, 1987, 1988, 1989, 1990, 1991, 1992, 1993, 1995, 1996, 1997, 1998, 1999, 2000, 2001, 2004, 2005, 2006, 2008, 2010, 2011, 2013, 2014, 2015, 2016, 2018, 2019, 2022, 2023, 2024
Erongo	3	1981, 2007, 2021
ǁKharas	2	2003, 2025
Oshikoto	2	1986, 2012
Hardap	1	2017
Otjozondjupa	1	2014
Zambezi	1	2009
Kavango East	1	2002

== Titleholders under Miss Namibia org. ==
=== Miss Universe Namibia ===
- : Declared as Winner
- : Ended as runner-up or top 5/6 qualification
- : Ended as one of the finalists or semifinalists
- : Ended as special awards winner

The main winner of Miss Namibia represents her country at the Miss Universe. On occasion, when the winner does not qualify (due to age) for either contest, a runner-up is sent.

Year	Region	Miss Namibia	Placement at Miss Universe	Special award(s)	Notes
Conny Maritz directorship — a franchise holder to Miss Universe from 1999
2026	Khomas	Charene Labuschagne	TBA		
2025	ǁKharas	Johanna Swartbooi	Unplaced		
2024	Khomas	Prisca Anyolo	Unplaced		
2023	Khomas	Jameela Uiras	Top 20		
2022	Khomas	Cassia Sharpley	Unplaced		
2021	Erongo	Chelsi Tashaleen Shikongo	Unplaced		As it turns out, Shikongo was named after the late American actress Chelsi Smith, who was crowned Miss Universe 1995.
Due to the impact of COVID-19 pandemic, no representative in 2020
2019	Khomas	Nadja Breytenbach	Unplaced		
2018	Khomas	Selma Carlicia Kamanya	Unplaced		
2017	Hardap	Suné January	Unplaced		
2016	Khomas	Lizelle Esterhuizen	Unplaced		
2015	Khomas	Steffanie "Steffi" van Wyk Freygang	Did not compete		
2014	Otjozondjupa	Brumhilda Ochs	Did not compete		
2013	Khomas	Paulina Nangula April Malulu	Unplaced		Before naming as Miss Namibia, Paulina was "Miss International Namibia 2012" and represented Namibia at Miss International 2012 where she made the Top 15 semi-finalists in Okinawa, Japan.
2012	Oshikoto	Tsakana Nkandih	Unplaced		
2011	Khomas	Odile Madeline Gertze	Did not compete		
2011	Khomas	Luzaan van Wyk	Did not compete		
2010	Khomas	Odile Madeline Gertze	Did not compete		
2009	Zambezi	Happie Namsiku Ntelamo	Unplaced		
2008	Erongo	Marichen Jolandi Luiperth	Did not compete		
2007	Khomas	Laurencia Endjala	Did not compete		
2006	Khomas	Anna Svetlana Nashandi	Unplaced		
2005	Khomas	Adele Basson	Unplaced		
2004	ǁKharas	Petrina Twahangwapo Thomas	Did not compete		
2003	Kavango East	Ndapewa Alfons	Top 10		
2002	Khomas	Michelle Heita	Unplaced		
2001	Khomas	Michelle Heita	Did not compete		
2000	Khomas	Mia de Klerk	Unplaced		
1999	Khomas	Vaanda Katjuongua	Unplaced		
Danie Botes directorship — a franchise holder to Miss Universe between 1997―1998
1998	Khomas	Retha Reinders	Unplaced		
1997	Khomas	Sheya Shipanga	Unplaced		
Nic Kruger directorship — a franchise holder to Miss Universe between 1981―1996
1996	Khomas	Faghma Absalom	Unplaced		
1995	Khomas	Patricia Burt	Unplaced		Namibia became the official venue of the Miss Universe 1995 competition.
1994	Khomas	Christalene Barbara Kahatjipara	Unplaced	Miss Congeniality	
1993	Khomas	Anja Schroeder	Unplaced		
1992	Khomas	Michelle McLean	Miss Universe 1992		
1991	Khomas	Ronel Liebenberg	Unplaced		
1990	Khomas	Emarencia "Emsie" Esterhuizen	Did not compete		
Did not compete between 1987—1989
1986	Oshikoto	Jo-Rina Meyer	Did not compete		
1985	Khomas	Alice Elizabeth Pfeiffer	Did not compete		
1984	Khomas	Peta Harley-Peters	Unplaced		
1983	Khomas	Astrid Klotzch	Unplaced		
1982	Khomas	Desere Anita Kotze	Unplaced		
1981	Erongo	Antoinette Knoetze	Unplaced		
1980	Khomas	Bernice Tembo	Did not compete		

=== Miss World Namibia ===
- : Declared as Winner
- : Ended as runner-up or top 5/6 qualification
- : Ended as one of the finalists or semifinalists
- : Ended as special awards winner

The runner-up of Miss Namibia will select as Miss World Namibia title. In some years the main winner also selected to Miss World before 2021.

Year	Region	Miss World Namibia	Placement at Miss World	Special award(s)	Notes
Miss World Namibia directorship — a franchise holder to Miss World from 2025
2026	Ohangwena	Elly Penomwene Aron	Unplaced		
2025	Khomas	Selma Carlicia Kamanya	Top 8	Head to Head Challenge (Top 8)	Previously Miss Namibia 2018
Conny Maritz directorship — a franchise holder to Miss World between 1999−2023
Miss World 2023 was rescheduled to 2024 due to the change of host and when entering India as the new host, there were several issues that caused the postponement until March 2024.
2023	Erongo	Leoné Renate van Jaarsveld	Unplaced		1st Runner-Up of Miss Namibia 2022
Miss World 2021 was rescheduled to 16 March 2022 due to the COVID-19 pandemic outbreak in Puerto Rico, no edition started in 2022.
2021	Kunene	Annerie Maré	Unplaced		1st Runner-Up of Miss Namibia 2021
Did not compete between 2017—2020
2016	Khomas	Lizelle Esterhuizen	Did not compete		
2015	Khomas	Steffanie "Steffi" van Wyk Freygang	Unplaced	Miss World Sport	
2014	Otjozondjupa	Brumhilda Ochs	Unplaced	Miss World Top Model (Top 20)	
2013	Khomas	Paulina Nangula April Malulu	Unplaced		
2012	Oshikoto	Tsakana Nkandih	Did not compete		
2011	Khomas	Luzaan van Wyk	Unplaced		
2010	Khomas	Odile Madeline Gertze	Top 25		
2009	Zambezi	Happie Namsiku Ntelamo	Unplaced	Miss World Beach Beauty (Top 20)	
2008	Khomas	Martha Elizabeth "Marelize" Robberts	Unplaced	Miss World Top Model (Top 32)	
2007	Erongo	Marichen Jolandi Luiperth	Unplaced		
2006	Khomas	Anna Svetlana Nashandi	Top 17		
2005	Khomas	Leefa Shiikwa	Unplaced		
2004	Khomas	Adele Basson	Unplaced		
2003	ǁKharas	Petrina Twahangwapo Thomas	Unplaced		
2002	Kavango East	Ndapewa Alfons	Unplaced		
2001	Khomas	Michelle Heita	Unplaced		
2000	Khomas	Mia de Klerk	Unplaced		
1999	Khomas	Vaanda Katjuongua	Did not compete		
Danie Botes directorship — a franchise holder to Miss World between 1997―1998
1998	Khomas	Retha Reinders	Did not compete		
1997	Khomas	Sheya Shipanga	Unplaced		
Nic Kruger directorship — a franchise holder to Miss World between 1989―1996
1996	Khomas	Faghma Absalom	Did not compete		
1995	Khomas	Patricia Burt	Did not compete		
Did not compete in 1994
1993	Khomas	Christalene Barbara Kahatjipara	Unplaced		
1992	Khomas	Linda Sharon Schultz	Unplaced		
1992	Khomas	Anja Schroeder	Did not compete		
1991	Khomas	Michelle McLean	Top 5		Later Miss Universe 1992.
1990	Khomas	Ronel Liebenberg	Unplaced		
1989	Khomas	Emarencia "Emsie" Esterhuizen	Unplaced		

=== Miss Earth Namibia ===
- : Declared as Winner
- : Ended as runner-up or top 5/6 qualification
- : Ended as one of the finalists or semifinalists
- : Ended as special awards winner

Began 2022 the organization of Miss Namibia is an official national franchise holder for Miss Earth. One of the runners-up at Miss Namibia will go to Miss Earth pageant.

Year	Region	Miss Earth Namibia	Placement at Miss Earth	Special award(s)	Notes
Conny Maritz directorship — a franchise holder to Miss Earth from 2022
2025	Omaheke	Ndeshipewa Angula	Top 25	(gold) Best Bikini (Africa)	Contestant of Miss Namibia 2025
2024	Khomas	Albertina Haimbala	Top 12		1st Runner-Up of Miss Namibia 2023
2023	Ohangwena	Martha Kautanevali	Unplaced		2nd Runner-Up of Miss Namibia 2023
2022	Khomas	Diana Andimba	Top 20	(gold) Best Eco Video (Africa)	2nd Runner-Up of Miss Namibia 2022

=== Miss Supranational Namibia ===
- : Declared as Winner
- : Ended as runner-up or top 5/6 qualification
- : Ended as one of the finalists or semifinalists
- : Ended as special awards winner

Began 2011 the organization of Miss Namibia is an official national franchise holder for Miss Supranational. One of the runners-up or finalists at Miss Namibia will go to Miss Supranational pageant.

Year	Miss Supranational Namibia	Placement	Special award(s)	Notes
Bobby Kaanjosa directorship — a franchise holder to Miss Supranational from 2011
2027	TBA	TBA	TBA	
2026	Cassia Sharpley	Top 24		
2025	Savannah Pereira	Unplaced		
2023	Romiley Hoffmann	Unplaced		
2022	Julita Kitwe Mbangula	Unplaced		
2021	Chanique Rabe	Miss Supranational 2021		
Due to the impact of COVID-19 pandemic, no competition held in 2020
2019	Yana Haenisch	1st Runner-Up		
2018	Ndilyowike Haipinge	Unplaced		
2017	Meriam Kaxuxwena	Unplaced	Best Body	
2012	Ester Ndapewoshali Shatipamba	Unplaced		
2011	Susanna Maria Van Zyl	Unplaced		

=== Miss Charm Namibia ===
- : Declared as Winner
- : Ended as runner-up or top 5/6 qualification
- : Ended as one of the finalists or semifinalists
- : Ended as special awards winner

Began 2024 the organization of Miss Namibia is an official national franchise holder for Miss Charm. One of the runners-up or finalists at Miss Namibia will go to Miss Charm pageant.

Year	Miss Charm Namibia	Placement	Special award(s)	Notes
Bobby Kaanjosa directorship — a franchise holder to Miss Charm from 2024
2026	Hertha Iipinge	TBA		
2025	Alica Mokhatu	Unplaced		Top 10 finalists at Miss Namibia 2025
2024	Georgia Garises	Top 10		2nd Runner-Up of Miss Namibia 2024
