= Tsakana Nkandih =

Namibian beauty queen and model

- Born: Tsakana Nkandih; Tsumeb, Namibia
- Height: 1.70 m (5 ft 7 in)
- Beauty pageant titleholder
- Title: Miss Namibia 2012
- Hair color: Black
- Major competitions: Miss Namibia 2012 (Winner); Miss Universe 2012

Tsakana Nkandih is a Namibian model and beauty pageant titleholder who elected as Miss Namibia 2012 at the Windhoek country club on Saturday night of 4 August 2012. Fifteen finalists participated in the final round. She represented Namibia in the Miss Universe 2012 pageant where she was unplaced.

Awards and achievements
| Preceded by Luzaan van Wyk | Miss Namibia; 2012 | Succeeded by Paulina Malulu |
