= Philippine International Convention Center =

Arts center in Pasay, Philippines

Philippine International Convention Center Sentrong Pangkumbensyong Pandaigdig ng Pilipinas
- Interactive map of Philippine International Convention Center; Sentrong Pangkumbensyong Pandaigdig ng Pilipinas
- Former names: Manila International Conference Center (1974–1975)
- Location: Vicente Sotto Street, CCP Complex, Manila Bay Freeport Zone, Pasay, Philippines
- Coordinates: 14°33′15″N 120°58′57″E
- Owner: Bangko Sentral ng Pilipinas

Construction
- Built: 1974–1976
- Opened: September 5, 1976; 50 years ago
- Renovated: 1996, 2025
- Architects: Leandro Locsin; Raul Locsin (1996 renovation)

Website
- www.picc.gov.ph

The Philippine International Convention Center (Filipino: Sentrong Pangkumbensyong Pandaigdig ng Pilipinas; PICC) is a convention center located in the Cultural Center of the Philippines Complex in Pasay, Philippines. The Brutalist facility has been the host of numerous local and foreign conventions, meetings, fairs, and social events.

The PICC also hosts the main office of the National Privacy Commission and an office of the Securities and Exchange Commission. It formerly housed the office of the vice president of the Philippines from 1992 to 2005, the Philippine Charity Sweepstakes Office, and a satellite office of the Professional Regulation Commission until 2025.

== History ==
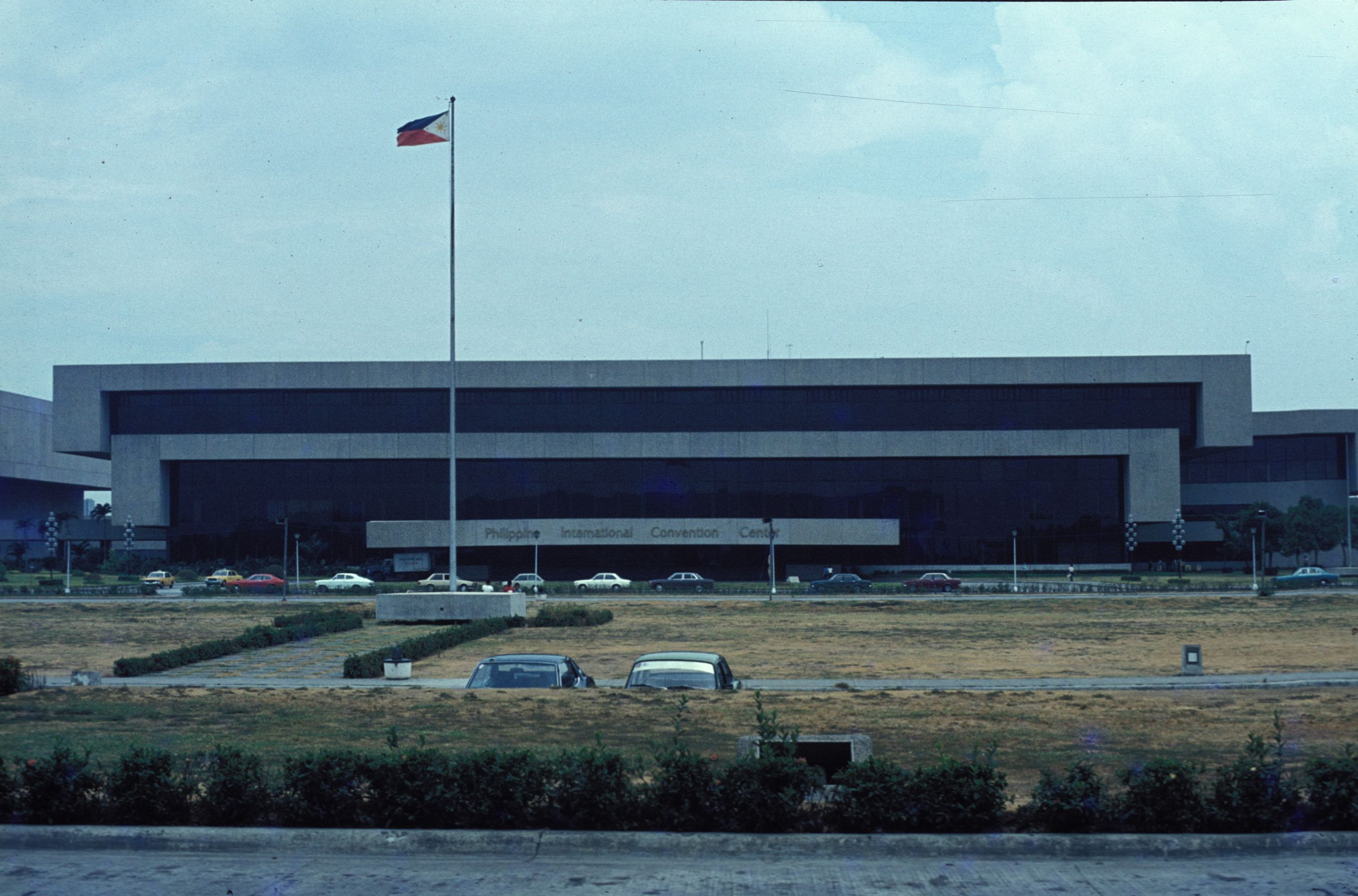
The PICC in 1981, as seen from the Folk Arts Theater

On July 23, 1974, President Ferdinand Marcos signed Presidential Decree No. 520, which authorized the Central Bank of the Philippines (now Bangko Sentral ng Pilipinas) to construct an international conference building, acquire a suitable area for that purpose, and organize a corporation to manage a conference center. The conference center was initially named as Manila International Conference Center.

This was a part of Marcos' efforts to make Metro Manila as one of Southeast Asia's financial centers. The PICC building, along with other buildings in the Cultural Center of the Philippines complex, has been associated with what has been termed Imelda Marcos' "edifice complex," which writer Gerard Lico defined as "obsession and compulsion to build edifices as a hallmark of greatness or as a signifier of national prosperity."

The construction of the conference center complex was undertaken in a short span of 23 months, from November 1974 to September 1976, with Leandro Locsin, who was subsequently named a National Artist of the Philippines, as architect. On May 27, 1975, the under-construction conference center was renamed as the Philippine International Convention Center (PICC).

On September 5, 1976, the PICC, Asia's first international convention center, was officially opened ahead of its first major event, the 1976 IMF–World Bank Meeting scheduled on October 4–8.

From its inception to the present, the PICC has also hosted the annual Awards Night of the Filipino Academy of Movie Arts and Sciences (FAMAS), the Philippine-equivalent of the Academy Awards, mostly at its Plenary Hall.

Presidential Decree No. 995 created the Batasang Bayan to function as a legislative body before the Interim Batasang Pambansa convened in 1978. So, on the 4th founding anniversary of the Bagong Lipunan (New Society) on September 21, 1976, the Batasang Bayan held its inauguration at the PICC. For the first time, the PICC was used to house a legislative body from 1976 to 1978. In 1986, the PICC Plenary Hall hosted the Commission on Elections (COMELEC) canvassing of the presidential snap elections, where a walkout occurred to protest the alleged electoral manipulation favoring President Ferdinand Marcos, an event considered as the triggering factor leading to the People Power Revolution.

The PICC was the venue of numerous significant events, including the World Law Conference in 1977, the XXIII World Medical Assembly in 1978, 30th World Chess Olympiad in 1992, Board of Governors Annual Meeting of the Asian Development Bank in 1993 and 2012, the Miss Universe pageant in 1994, the APEC meeting in 1996, and the 3rd Informal Summit of the ASEAN in 1999.

Renovation work of the PICC was completed in 1996, which took around seven months for the APEC Meeting after the aging structure has been neglected since 1985. Renovations were headed by Raul Locsin, the cousin of the original architect of the facility. The endeavor was funded by the facility's owner, the Bangko Sentral ng Pilipinas. In 2003, the PICC Forum was inaugurated as part of the expansion.

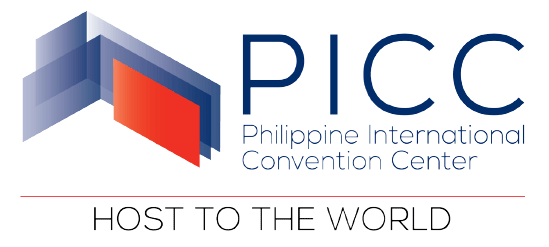
Logo from 2014 to 2025

In March 2011, "The Feast," a weekly prayer meeting of the Light of Jesus Family founded by Bo Sanchez, began holding its sessions at the PICC. The Feast PICC has an attendance of 3,000 at the Plenary and Reception Halls combined. Similarly, PICC was a venue of the Kerygma Conference (now Feast Conference) in November 2013 and November 2014.

On November 18–19, 2015, the PICC hosted the APEC Economic Leaders' Meeting. On April 29, 2017, the PICC hosted the 30th ASEAN Summit. It was the site of protests on November 11, 2017, against the arrival of U.S. President Donald Trump. It also hosted the Twelfth East Asia Summit on November 14, 2017.

On December 4–9, 2019, the PICC Forum became the venue for the sport of boxing at the 2019 Southeast Asian Games.

On September 27, 2022, PICC and its four intrinsic artworks were publicly declared as National Cultural Treasure (NCT).

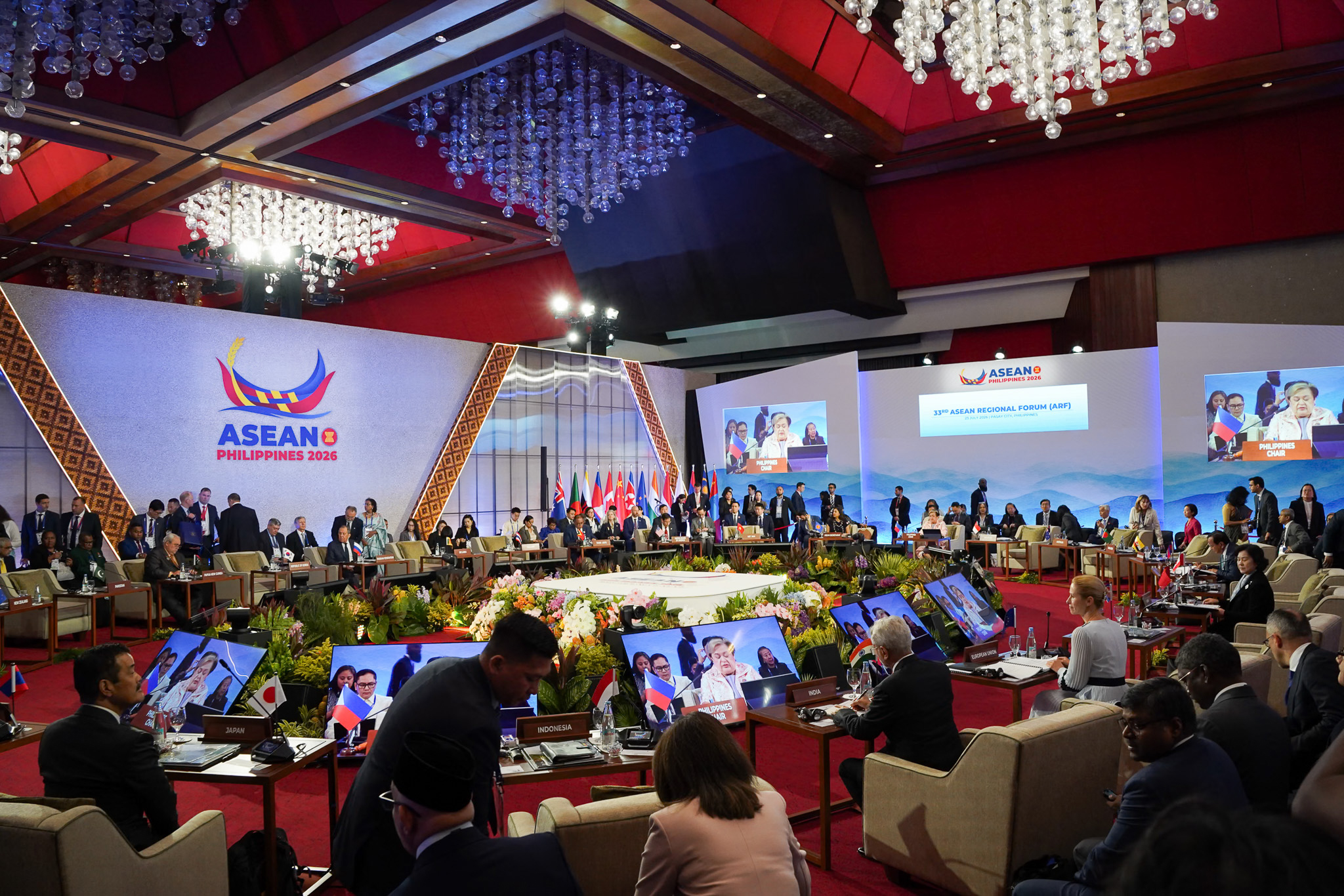
Reception hall of the PICC during the 16th East Asia Summit Foreign Ministers Meeting in 2026

From March to September 2025, PICC was temporarily closed to undergo renovation in preparation for its 50th anniversary and the 48th and 49th ASEAN Summits to be hosted by the Philippines in 2026. On March 17, 2025, four Professional Regulation Commission offices were permanently relocated to the commission's main office in Sampaloc, Manila. PICC was reopened on September 30, 2025.

=== Incidents ===
- May 13, 2019: At around 7:00 p.m. (PHT), a caliber .40 pistol was accidentally discharged at the PICC while it was transferred between security officers changing shifts, coinciding with the Commission on Elections' vote canvassing for the 2019 Philippine general election. The incident left no injuries nor casualties, as the bullet only struck the floor.
- May 12, 2023: The National Privacy Commission, headquartered at the PICC, received a bomb threat through their Facebook page, prompting evacuation and suspension of activities at the PICC. However, a thorough inspection by the Explosive Ordnance Disposal unit and K9 teams confirmed it was a hoax, as no explosive devices were found.

== Architecture and design ==
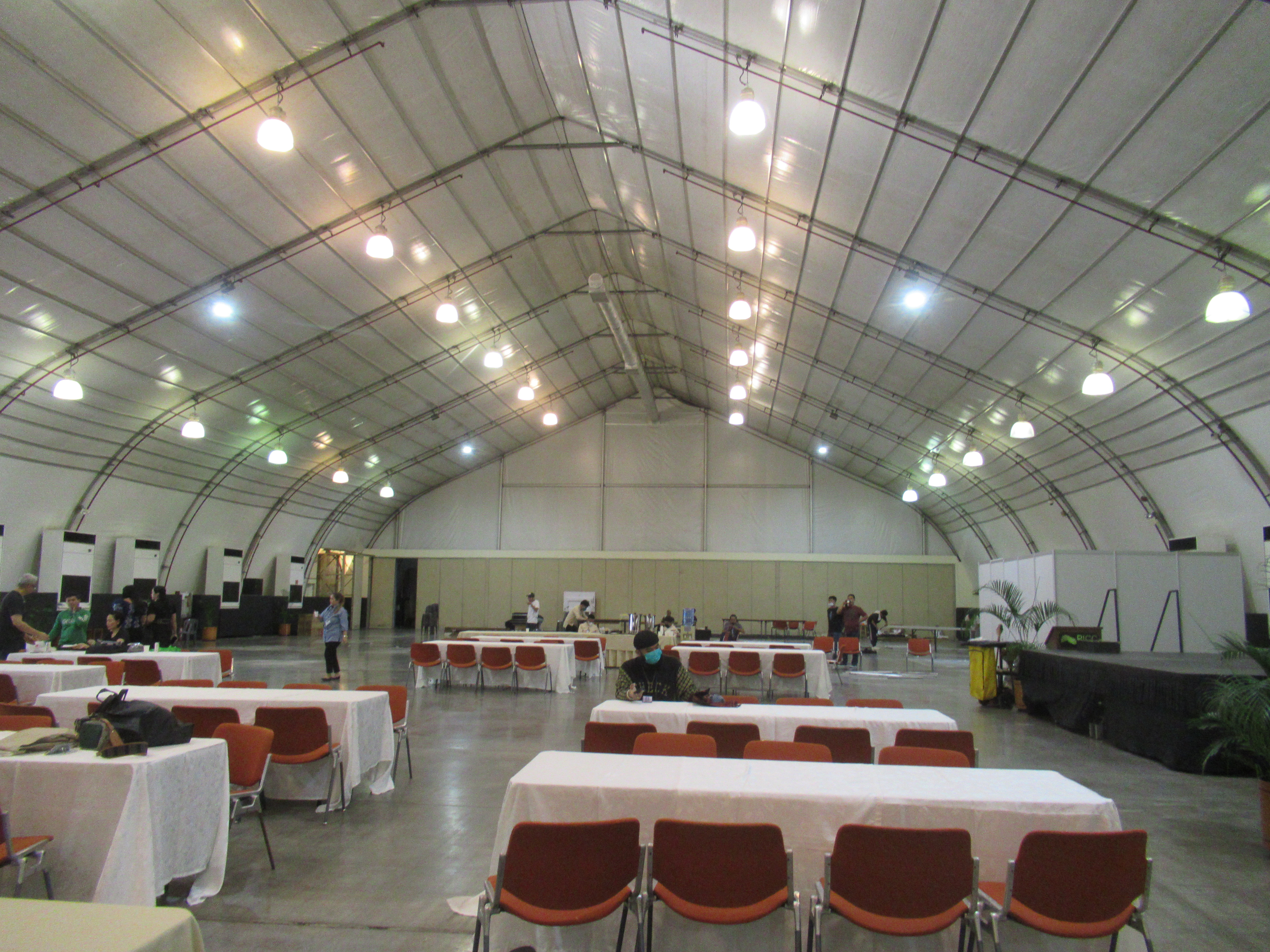
Interior of the PICC Forum

The PICC is composed of five building modules: the Delegation Building, Secretariat Building, Plenary Hall, Reception Hall and The Forum. Designed by Leandro Locsin, the facility is situated on a 12-hectare (30-acre) lot in reclaimed land. It has 38 meeting rooms, a Muslim prayer hall, and a floor area of more than 70,000 square feet (6,500 m^{2}). Surrounding the Reception and Plenary Halls are reflecting pools, while open-air facilities like The Courtyard and The Garden are also present within the complex.

== Artworks ==
The PICC is home to four intrinsic artworks by renowned Filipino artists, also declared as National Cultural Treasures in 2022, such as:

- The Pagdiriwang by José T. Joya, a 7-by-5.5-meter (23 by 18 ft) oil-on-canvas painting, one of the largest abstract works in the Philippines, displayed on the Upper Lobby wall of the Delegation Building.
- Anito by Arturo Luz, a 10.28-meter (33.7 ft) sculpture crafted from cast concrete and metal, serving as the centerpiece at The Courtyard.
- Grid by Arturo Luz, a nonmagnetic satin steel sculpture in the shape of an octothorpe, mounted above the grand staircase of the Plenary and Reception Hall Lobby
- Napoleon Abueva’s collection of 93 wooden benches with laminated wood bases and polished stainless-steel surfaces, in both rectangular three-seaters and squarish four-seaters, located throughout the PICC.

In addition to these, the PICC also houses a variety of other artworks displayed in its buildings. Following its 2025 renovation, it will debut a new art collection showcasing notable works from the Bangko Sentral ng Pilipinas.

== APEC Sculpture Garden ==
The APEC Sculpture Garden is located in the right, left and front lawns of the PICC. It was jointly organized by the Department of Foreign Affairs and the National Commission for Culture and the Arts, the curator of the garden, in commemoration of the APEC Philippines 1996. The garden is composed of 20 unique sculptures made by artists from their respective APEC countries. Each sculpture embodies the collective ideals of the 20 APEC member economies. The countries that donated their sculptures to the garden include Australia, Brunei Darussalam, Canada, Chile, Chinese Taipei, Hong Kong, Indonesia, Japan, Malaysia, Mexico, New Zealand, Philippines, Papua New Guinea, People's Republic of China, Republic of Korea, Russian Federation, Singapore, Thailand, United States and Vietnam. As of 2017, only Peru has yet to donate a sculpture to the garden.

== Gallery ==
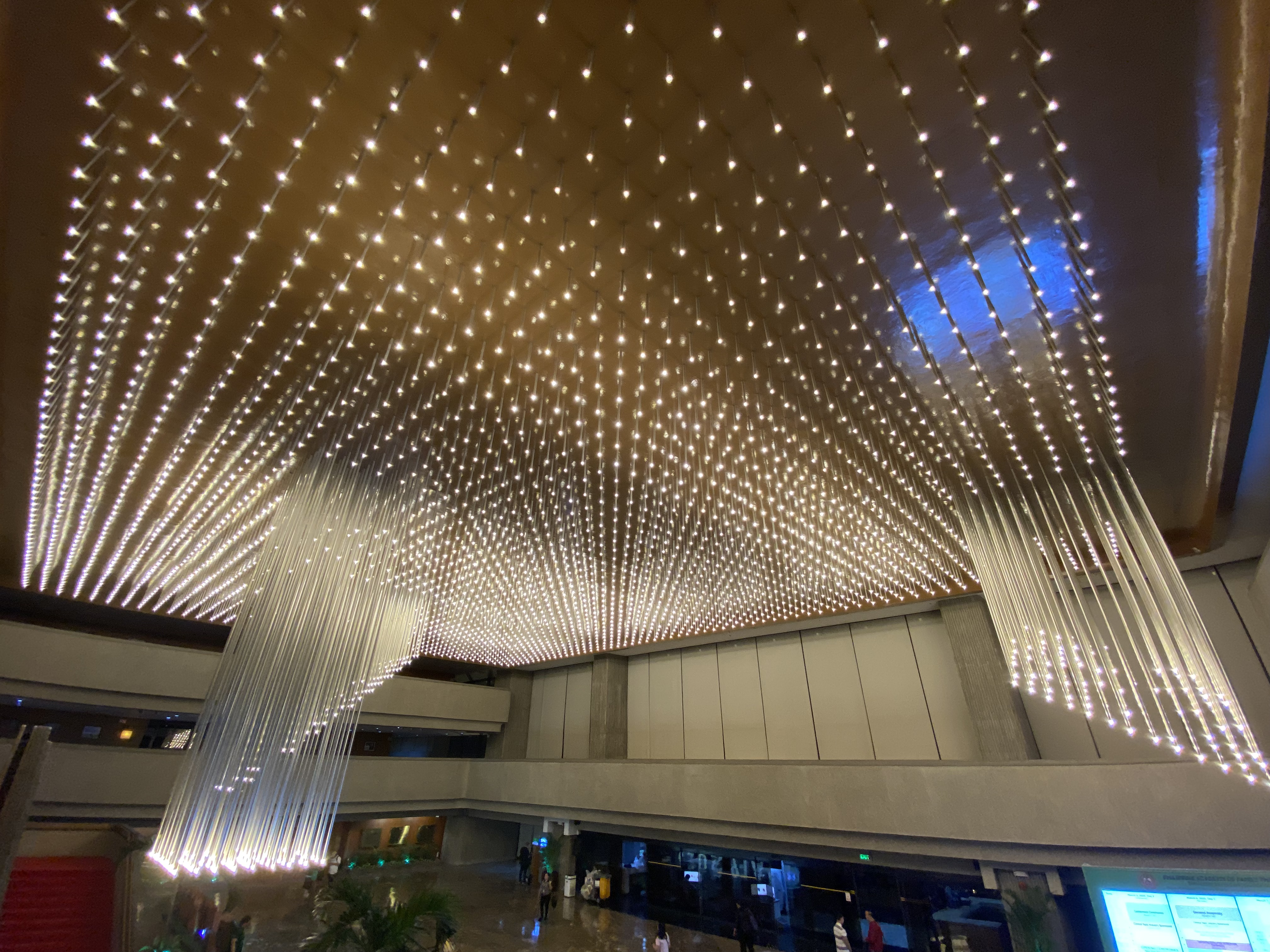
Main lobby of the Delegation Building

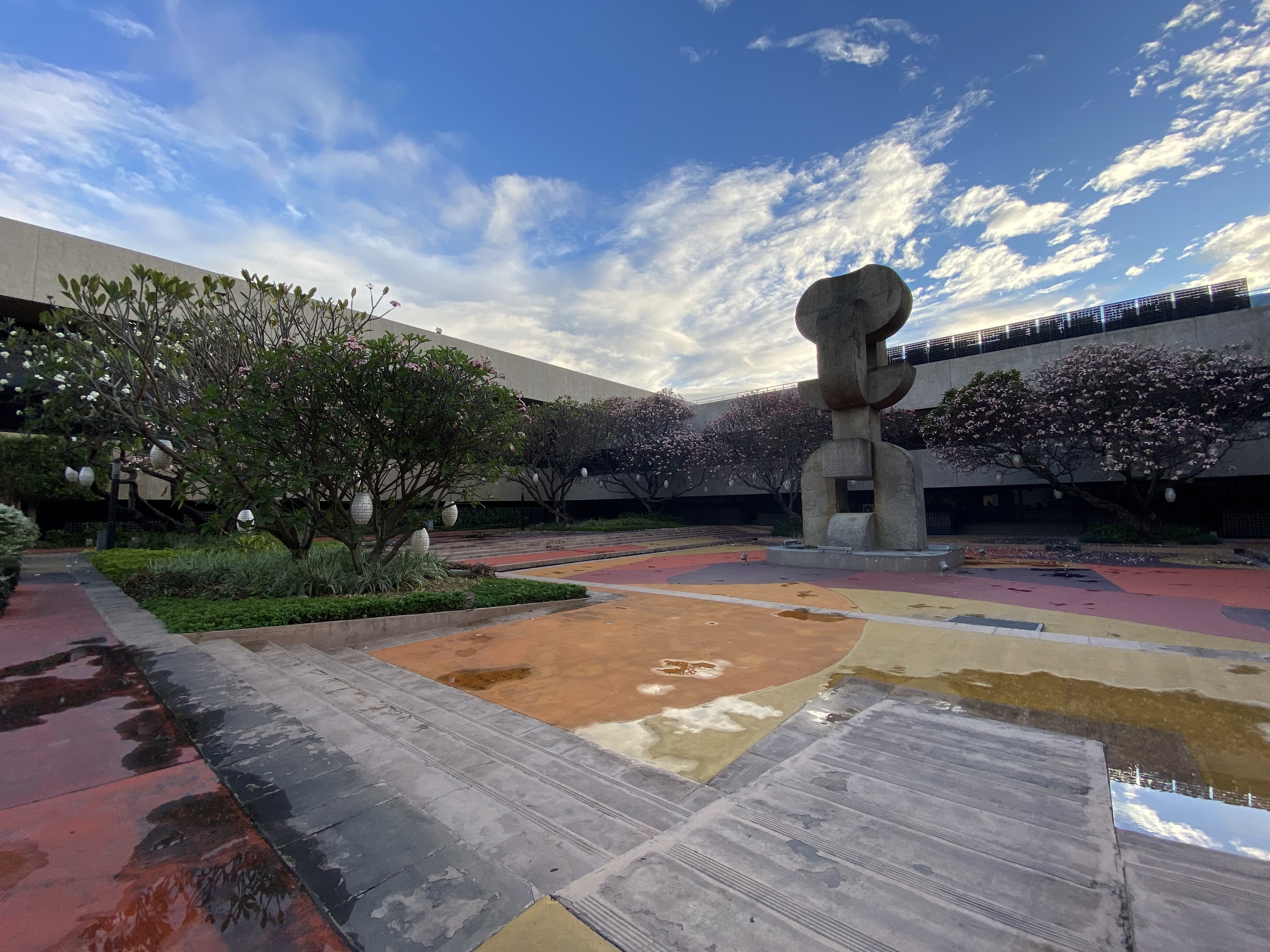
The Courtyard with the sculpture "Anito" by National Artist Arturo Luz

Plenary Hall

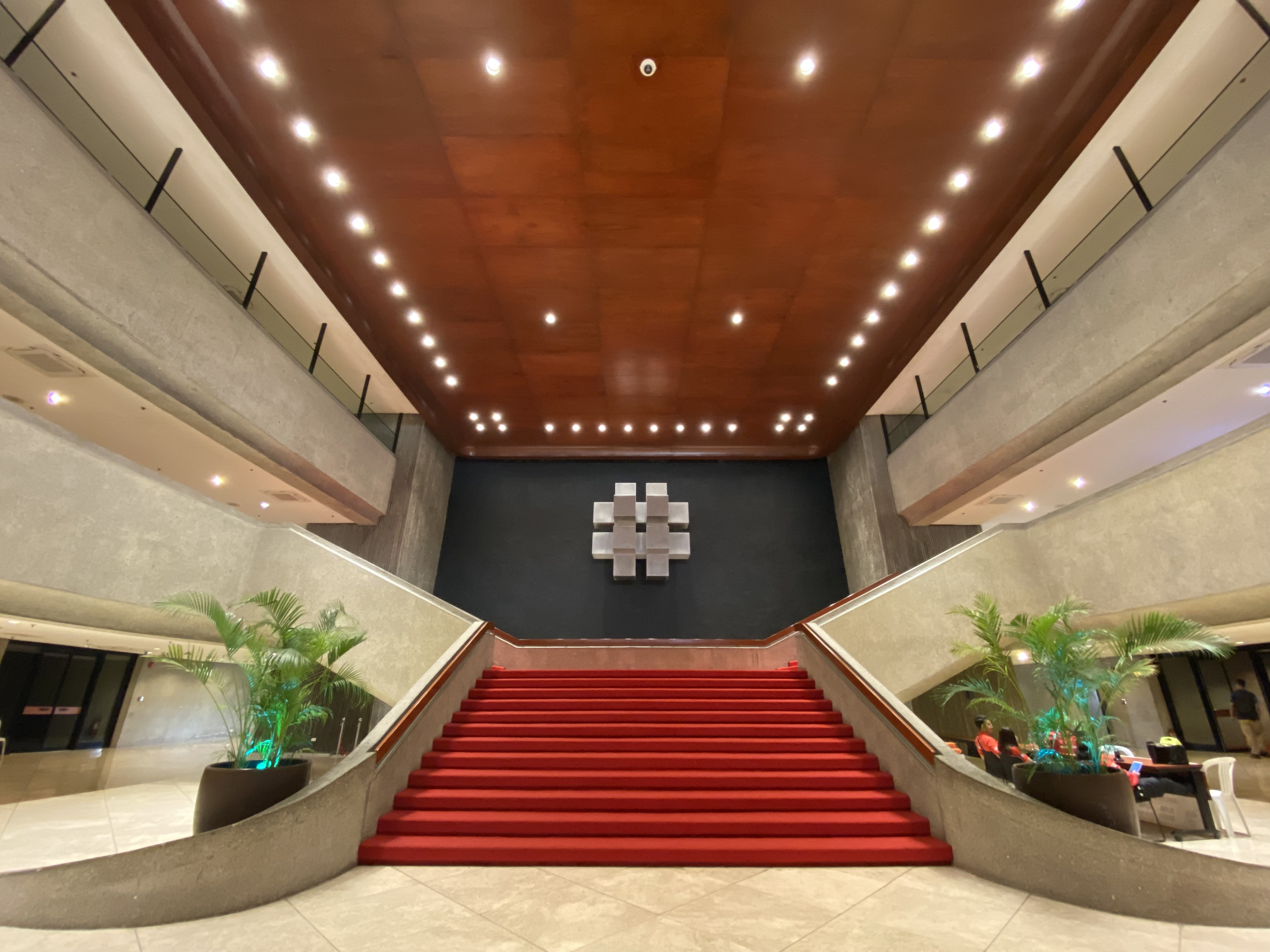
Lobby of the Plenary Hall with the sculpture "Grid" by Arturo Luz

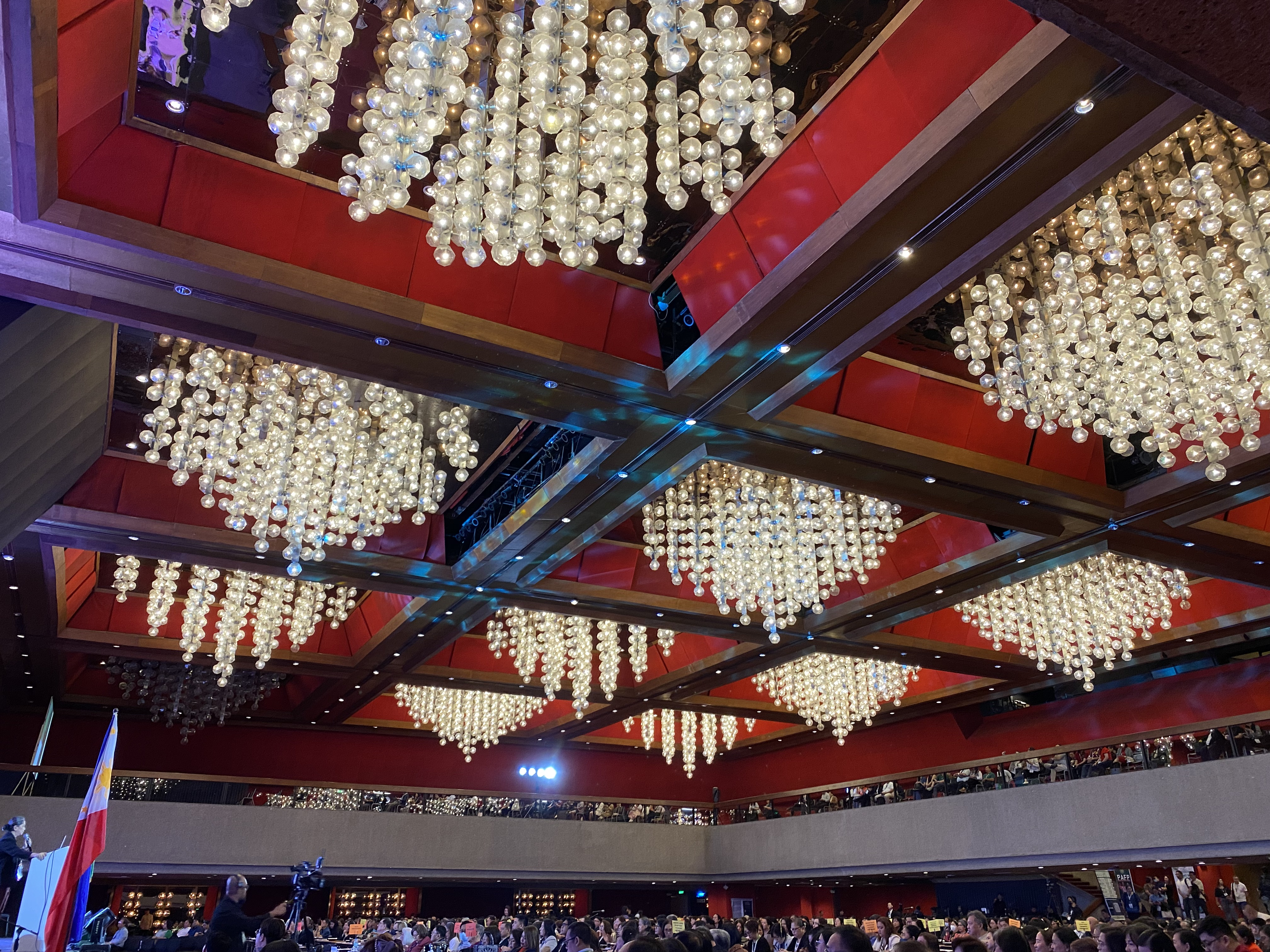
Chandeliers above the Reception Hall

== See also ==
- Philippine International Exhibition Center

Preceded by National Auditorium; Mexico City	Miss Universe venue 1994	Succeeded by Windhoek Country Club Resort (Namibia) Windhoek
