= Diana Andimba =

Namibian model

- Born: 1998 or 1999 (age 26–27); Windhoek, Namibia
- Education: European University of Lefke
- Occupations: Architect in Training; Model
- Height: 1.68 m (5 ft 6 in)
- Beauty pageant titleholder
- Title: Miss Earth Namibia 2022
- Major competitions: Miss Earth 2022 (Top 20)

Diana Andimba (born between 1998/1999) is a Namibian model, architect in training, and beauty pageant titleholder who was crowned Miss Earth Namibia and represented Namibia at Miss Earth 2022 where she was part of the Top 20 semifinalists. She has become the first delegate from Namibia to enter the semifinals of Miss Earth.

== Life and career ==
=== Early life ===
She came from a tribe known as the Ovambo, which is the largest ethnic group in Namibia. As published on Miss Earth's website, Diana shared that she grew up in the slums, which allowed her to see some issues in her community in her early years. She still considers her childhood to be "full of memories, laughter, and great times."

Diana founded a nonprofit organization called "Diana's Heartbeat Foundation" in 2019. The utmost goal of her foundation is to achieve zero informal settlement and to secure home sustainability measures.

== Pageantry ==
=== Miss Namibia 2022 ===
Diana joined 11 other Namibian women in competing for Miss Namibia 2022 pageant. At the end of the pageant, Diana was called as Second Runner-Up, to be later on given the title of Miss Earth Namibia 2022. Diana becomes the first Namibian delegate to compete at Miss Earth after 2016 through Elize Shakalela.

=== Miss Earth 2022 ===
Diana flew to the Philippines to be part of Miss Earth 2022 in November 2022. She competed from various preliminary competition across the Philippines and participated in several environmental activities such as school tours, tree planting, and environmental seminars.

Part of the Miss Earth pageant program is to provide an advocacy from each delegate. Diana chose Pangolin as her main advocacy to promote its condition as the said specie has a slow reproduction the results to only one birth annually.

During the finals night of Miss Earth 2022, Diana got the award of "Best Eco Video" for Africa. She was also called as one of the Top 20 semifinalists; while South Korea's Mina Sue Choi was called the winner of Miss Earth 2022.

Awards and achievements
Preceded by Elize Shakalela (2016)	Miss Earth Namibia; 2022	Succeeded by Martha Kautanevali
