= Marelize Robberts =

Namibian model

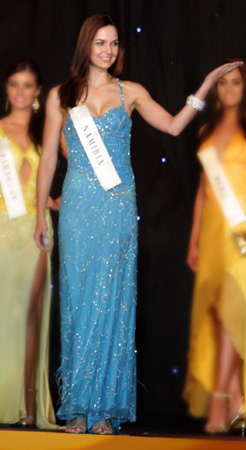
- Born: Martha Elizabeth Robberts; 1986 (age 39–40); Windhoek, South West Africa
- Height: 1.80 m (5 ft 11 in)
- Beauty pageant titleholder
- Title: Miss Namibia 2008

Martha Elizabeth “Marelize” Robberts (born 1986) is a Namibian model and beauty pageant titleholder who won the title of Miss Namibia 2008 and represented Namibia in Miss World 2008 in South Africa.
