= Cassia Sharpley =

Namibian beauty pageant titleholder

- Born: Namibia
- Beauty pageant titleholder
- Title: Miss Namibia 2022; Miss Universe Namibia 2022; Miss Cosmo Namibia 2025; Miss Supranational Namibia 2026
- Major competitions: Miss Teen Namibia 2017; (1st Runner-up); Miss Teen Continents 2018; (Unplaced); Miss Namibia 2022; (Winner); Miss Universe 2022; (Unplaced); Miss Cosmo 2025; (Unplaced); Miss Supranational 2026; (Top 24); (Supra Chat Winner)

Cassia Sharpley is a Namibian beauty pageant titleholder, who won Miss Namibia 2022. She represented Namibia at Miss Universe 2022 and Miss Cosmo 2025 in Vietnam, and was unplaced in both competitions. She also represented Namibia at Miss Supranational 2026 in Poland and finished in the top 24.

== Pageantry ==
Cassia Sharpley's first pageant was in 2017, where she was first runner-up at Miss Teen Namibia 2017. On June 23, 2018, Sharpley represented Namibia at Miss Teen Continental 2018, at the South Point Hotel and Casino in Las Vegas, Nevada, United States, competing against eight other contestants. She was unplaced, and won the Best Interview award.

=== Miss Namibia 2022 ===
On 12 August 2022, Sharpley won Miss Namibia 2022, at the Windhoek Country Club Resort and Casino in Windhoek, competing alongside 12 other contestants.

=== Miss Universe 2022 ===
Sharpley represented Namibia at Miss Universe 2022 and was unplaced.

=== Miss Cosmo 2025 ===
She was appointed as the first Miss Cosmo Namibia to represent the country at Miss Cosmo 2025 and was unplaced.

=== Miss Supranational 2026 ===
Sharpley represented Namibia at Miss Supranational 2026, where she won the Supra Chat challenge, securing her place in the top 24.

Awards and achievements
Preceded by Chelsi Shikongo	Miss Namibia; 2022	Succeeded by Jameela Uiras
Preceded by None	Miss Cosmo Namibia; 2025	Succeeded by Incumbent
Preceded by Jiahui Jade Wu	Cosmo Impactful Beauty Award; 2025	Succeeded by Incumbent
