= Paulina Malulu =

Namibian beauty queen and model (born 1989)

Paulina Nangula Malulu
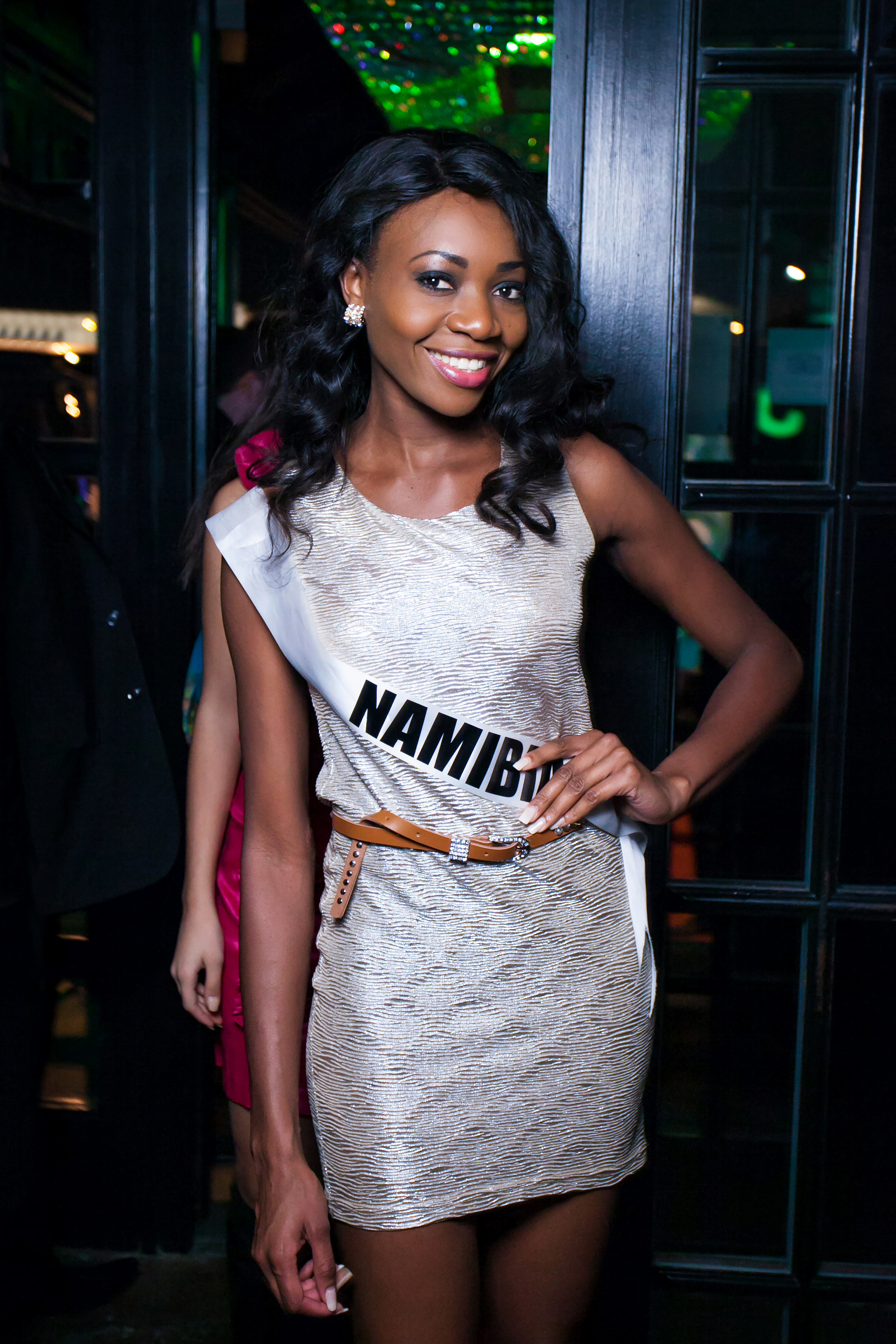
- Born: Paulina Nangula Malulu; April 28, 1989 (age 37); Windhoek, South West Africa (now Namibia)
- Height: 1.75 m (5 ft 9 in)
- Beauty pageant titleholder
- Title: Miss International Namibia 2012; Miss Namibia 2013; Miss Earth Namibia 2014
- Hair color: Black
- Major competitions: Miss International Namibia 2012; Miss International 2012 (Top 15); Miss Namibia 2013 (Winner); Miss World 2013 (Unplaced); Miss Universe 2013 (Unplaced); Miss Earth 2014 (Unplaced)

Paulina Malulu (born 28 April 1989) is a Namibian model and beauty pageant titleholder who represented Namibia and participated at the Big Four international beauty pageants. She competed in Miss International 2012 and was in the Top 15. She went on to compete for Miss World 2013 and Miss Universe 2013 and Miss Earth 2014.

Born in exile, shortly before independence, Malulu grew up in Windhoek. After completing her high school education, Malulu studied health and skincare and also has a qualification in tour guiding.

Malulu is also the executive director and founder of the Paulina Malulu Trust (PMT), an operating, not-for-gain organization that advocates for the roles of beauty queens. She also organised the "Day of the Beauty Queen", an annual event that highlights the important social role of beauty queens that was first held in Namibia in 2015.

She has represented Namibian youth on the African Youth Forum, the Global Aids Summit and serving as Public Relations for the Namibia Book Fair.

Awards and achievements
Preceded by Tsakana Nkandih	Miss Namibia; 2013	Succeeded by Brumhilda Ochs
