= Brumhilda Ochs =

Namibian model and beauty pageant titleholder

- Born: Brumhilda Ochs; 1992 (age 33–34); Windhoek, Namibia
- Height: 1.79 m (5 ft 10 1/2 in)
- Beauty pageant titleholder
- Title: Miss Namibia 2014
- Hair color: Black
- Eye color: Black
- Major competitions: Miss Namibia 2014 (Winner)

Brumhilda Ochs - Pachawo (born 1992, Windhoek, Namibia) is a Namibian model and beauty pageant titleholder who was crowned Miss Namibia 2014 and represented Namibia at the Miss World 2014.

== Early life ==
Ochs is a student of Medicine at Unam School of Namibia. She was volunteering as A Model for AIDS Risk Reduction Model by Bupe.

== Pageantry ==
=== Best Model of the World 2010 ===
Ochs represented Namibia at Best Model of the World 2010 in Plovdiv, Bulgaria by Namibian Model Casting.

=== Miss Namibia 2014 ===
Ochs was crowned as Miss Namibia 2014 represented Windhoek on August 2, 2014.

=== Miss World 2014 ===
Ochs competed at Miss World 2014 in London, United Kingdom.

Awards and achievements
Preceded by Paulina Malulu	Miss Namibia; 2014	Succeeded by Steffi Van Wyk
