= Barbara Kahatjipara =

Namibian model

- Born: Barbara Kahatjipara; 1975 (age 50–51); Windhoek, Namibia
- Height: 6 ft 0 in (1.83 m)
- Beauty pageant titleholder
- Title: Miss Namibia 1993
- Hair color: Honey Brown
- Eye color: Brown
- Major competitions: Miss Namibia 1993 (Winner); Miss Universe 1994 (Unplaced)

Kahatjipara Barbara (born 1975) is a Namibian fashion model, economics teacher and beauty pageant titleholder.

== Career ==
She won Miss Namibia 1993 and the Miss Universe Congeniality 1994 award as part of the Miss Universe 1994.

== Early life and education ==
Barbara Kahatjipara completed also a BA degree in international politics at the University of Cape Town in South Africa and an MBA in "International Marketing" at the Fachhochschule Reutlingen in Germany and about 2008 she has been a research assistant at the economics institute of the Polytechnic of Namibia in Windhoek. In 2020, she worked as an actress.

In the Namibian city Karibib, a street was named after her.
