= Steffi van Wyk =

Namibian model (born 1991)

- Born: October 23, 1991 (age 34); Windhoek, Namibia
- Height: 1.75 m (5 ft 9 in)
- Beauty pageant titleholder
- Title: Miss Namibia 2015
- Hair color: Brown
- Eye color: Hazel
- Major competitions: Miss Namibia 2015 (Winner); Miss World 2015 (Unplaced) (Miss World Sport)

Steffi van Wyk-Brink (born 23 October 1991) is a Namibian model and beauty pageant titleholder who represented Namibia at the Miss World 2015 pageant. She is a Survivor South Africa reality Star.

== Early life and education ==
Van Wyk is from Otjiwarongo and grew up on a farm. She attended Jan Mohr Secondary School in Windhoek. She studied further in South Africa.

== Career ==
Van Wyk was a sports organiser and a part-time fitness instructor at Jan Mohr Secondary School, her former high school. Her contract with the school, however, expired in August 2015. After August 2015, van Wyk devoted time to prepare for her title as Miss Namibia 2015.

In August 2015, van Wyk won the title of Miss Namibia. The pageant was held in Windhoek, Namibia. Van Wyk represented Namibia and competed at Miss World 2015.

Van Wyk is a fitness instructor and body builder. She co-owns a sports, fitness, and wellness company, with her husband.

Van Wyk was a contestant on 2019's Survivor South Africa: Island of Secrets. Van Wyk competed in Survivor South Africa: Return of the Outcasts.

== Personal life ==
In August 2016, van Wyk married Clint Brink, a South African actor. They live in Johannesburg.

== See also ==
- Miss Namibia

Awards and achievements
Preceded by Brumhilda Ochs	Miss Namibia; 2015	Succeeded by Lizelle Esterhuizen
