= Philippine International Exhibition Center =

Convention center in Pasay, Philippines

- Location: Pasay Harbor City, Pasay, Philippines

Construction
- Construction cost: ₱27 billion

The Philippine International Exhibition Center (PIEC) is an under-construction convention center located in Pasay Harbor City, Pasay, Philippines.

== Background ==
=== Construction ===
The Philippine International Exhibition Center will be constructed at a cost of ₱27 billion pesos and is divided into two phases: Phase 1 (2024–2025) is set to be constructed by EEI Corporation at a cost of ₱15.75 billion which covers the detailed engineering and design, foundation, structural and architectural works, while Phase 2 (2026–2027) is allocated with the remaining budget and will focus on the civil, structural, and architectural works.

== See also ==
- Philippine International Convention Center
