= Clint Brink =

South African actor

- Born: 29 September 1980 (age 45); Paarl, Cape Province, South Africa (now Western Cape)
- Education: CityVarsity
- Occupation: Actor
- Years active: 2005–present
- Height: 1.73 m (5 ft 8 in)
- Spouse: Steffi van Wyk (Steffi Brink)
- Partner: Marubini Mogale (2000–2002) (deceased)
- Children: 1

Clint Brink (born 29 September 1980) is a South African actor. He is best known for his roles in the films King Dog, Ellen: Die storie van Ellen Pakkies and Lockdown Heights as well as the soap opera Binnelanders.

== Early life ==
Brink was born in Paarl, Cape Province (now Western Cape). He attended New Orleans High School. He went on to graduate with a Bachelor of Arts in Film and Television from CityVarsity School of Media and Creative Arts in 1999.

== Career ==
During his studies, Brink worked on several short films. At the age of 19 after graduation, he auditioned for the film Gangsters and dancers. Unfortunately, the film was cancelled before its production. However, he landed the role of Shaun Jacobs in the television series Backstage. He then appeared in the soap opera Generations as 'Bradley Paulse'. He also starred in several South African films such as Dollars and White Pipes, Swop! and Mega Python vs. Gatoroid.

In 2006, he was nominated for the South African Film and Television Award (SAFTA) for Best Actor in a Feature Film for his role in the blockbuster film Dollars + White Pipes. In 2007 he starred as Valentino "Tino" Martens in the series Scandal!. For his performance, he earned SAFTAs for Best Actor and Best Supporting Actor in a TV Soap.

== Personal life ==
In 2000, Brink began dating fellow actress Marubini Mogale. In 2002, Brink, Mogale, and Mogale's sister Lerato were in a car together. The driver lost control and the car overturned; Marubini died while Brink and Lerato sustained minor injuries.

Brink married Steffi van Wyk, a Namibian model and beauty pageant winner, in 2016.

== Filmography ==
Year	Film	Role	Genre	Ref.
2005	Binnelanders	Dr. Steve Abrahams	TV series	
2005	Dollars and White Pipes	Bernie Baaitjies	Film	
2007	Scandal!	Valentino "Tino" Martens	Film	
2008	Swop!	Bevan Adonis	Film	
2013	Lucky Bastard	Devin	Film	
2014	Rockville	Trevor	TV series	
2018	Ellen: The Ellen Pakkies Story	Adrian Samuels	Film	
2020	Lockdown Heights	Damien	TV series	
TBD	King Dog	Kong	Film	
