= Department of Higher Education =

Department of Higher Education may refer to:

== India ==
- Department of Higher Education (India)
- Department of Higher Education (Haryana)
- Department of Higher Education (Odisha)
- Department of Higher Education (Tamil Nadu)
- Department of Higher Education (Kerala)

== South Africa ==
- Department of Higher Education and Training

== Other places ==
- Department of Higher Education (Malaysia)
- Department of Higher Education (Myanmar)
- Colorado Department of Higher Education
