= Miss Universe 1994 =

43rd Miss Universe pageant

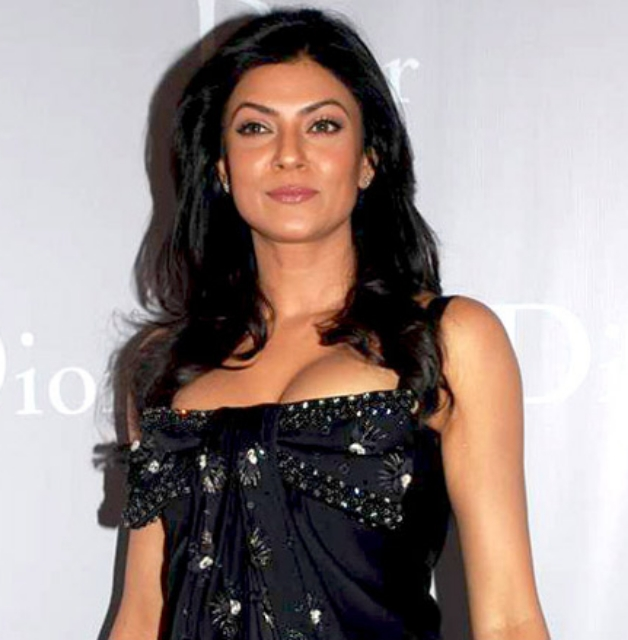
- Sushmita Sen, Miss Universe 1994
- Date: 21 May 1994 (Note: The event was held at 8:00 am Philippine Standard Time (UTC+08:00); for the Americas, this was May 20 in their local times.)
- Presenters: Bob Goen; Arthel Neville; Angela Visser
- Entertainment: Peabo Bryson; Bayanihan Philippine National Folk Dance Company; Eraserheads
- Venue: Plenary Hall, Philippine International Convention Center, Pasay City, Metro Manila, Philippines
- Broadcaster: CBS (international); ABS-CBN (DWWX-TV) (official broadcaster)
- Entrants: 77
- Placements: 10
- Debuts: Russia; Slovakia; Zimbabwe
- Withdrawals: Austria; Belize; Czech Republic; Ghana; Lebanon; Nicaragua; Suriname; United States Virgin Islands
- Returns: Cook Islands; Egypt; Republic of China
- Winner: Sushmita Sen; India
- Congeniality: Barbara Kahatjipara (Namibia)
- Best National Costume: Charlene Gonzales (Philippines)
- Photogenic: Minorka Mercado (Venezuela)

Miss Universe 1994 was the 43rd Miss Universe pageant, held at the Plenary Hall of the Philippine International Convention Center in Pasay City, Philippines, on 21 May 1994. Seventy-seven contestants competed during this year.

At the conclusion of the event, Dayanara Torres of Puerto Rico crowned Sushmita Sen of India as Miss Universe 1994, marking the first time India won Miss Universe, which they would later win again in 2000 and in 2021.

== Background ==
=== Location and date ===
Manila was announced as host city for the pageant in October 1993. It was the second time the pageant was held in the Philippines, after it was staged at the nearby Folk Arts Theater in 1974. The country expected to make ₱10 million (US$357,000) profit out of the pageant, as well as the accompanying media exposure. The ₱150 million ($5.3 million) spent on hosting the pageant was funded from the private sectors, with sponsors such as Nestlé, Kodak and Hertz. Some of the expected sponsorship money did not materialize, leading the shortfall to be covered by the government. In the midst of power shortages around the time of the pageant, the Philippine government promised to ensure that the weekend of the pageant's coronation night would be "blackout-free". By mid May, as the contestants were already in Manila, organizers confirmed that they were short of money and were unsure whether a profit would be made from the event. There was also a probe by the Commission on Human Rights during May as to whether a police round-up of street children was intended to improve Manila's international image during the pageant events. This was also criticised by Miss Thailand, Areeya Chumsai, even though the same incident occurred in Thailand in the Miss Universe 1992 pageant.

During rehearsal on the day prior to the pageant, a small homemade bomb exploded outside the pageant venue where the contestants had earlier been rehearsing, though it caused minimal damage and there were no injuries. As a result, more than 3000 Filipino police officers were involved in protecting the delegates, as well as dozens of policewomen assigned as personal or group bodyguards.

The pageant came under public attack from the Nationalist Movement of New Women, a branch of the National Democratic Front, which claimed that it was being used to promote sex tourism. The cost of the event was also criticized by the Philippine Congress, despite it being endorsed by President Fidel V. Ramos. A social function attended by the delegates held prior to the final broadcast was picketed by the women's group, who opposed the nature of the pageant and the lavish spending.

=== Controversies ===
Miss Malaysia, Liza Koh, made a public apology on behalf of her country about the arrest of 1200 Filipina domestic helpers in Kuala Lumpur. As a result, the Malaysian Foreign Minister Abdullah Ahmad Badawi admonished her not to make any further political remarks.

Miss Philippines, Charlene Gonzales, gained criticism for winning the Best National Costume award, as the judges were also criticized for allegedly favouring the host nation's delegate. Miss British Virgin Islands, Delia Jon Baptiste, publicly declared that Gonzales won the award, because of Filipino favouritism, and that the other delegates disagreed with the choice. Miss Venezuela Minorka Mercado, won the Philippine costume Terno award, followed by Slovakia, who was also celebrating her birthday, and Miss Mexico by their respective placements.

== Results ==
=== Placements ===
Placement	Contestant
Miss Universe 1994	India – Sushmita Sen
1st Runner-Up	Colombia – Carolina Gómez
2nd Runner-Up	Venezuela – Minorka Mercado
Top 6	Philippines – Charlene Gonzales; Slovakia – Silvia Lakatošová; United States – Lu Parker
Top 10	Greece – Rea Toutounzi; Italy – Arianna David; Sweden – Domenique Forsberg; Switzerland – Patricia Fässler

=== Special awards ===
Award	Winner
Best National Costume	Philippines – Charlene Gonzales
Miss Congeniality	Namibia – Barbara Kahatjipara
Miss Photogenic	Venezuela – Minorka Mercado

== Pageant ==
=== Format ===
Prior to the final telecast, all contestants competed in pre-pageant shows including the national costume and opening show held at the Araneta Coliseum, and swimsuit and evening gown during the preliminary competition held at its main venue, the Philippine International Convention Center. They also participated in interviews with the judges.

During the final competition, the ten semifinalists competed in the swimsuit, evening gown and interview. The top six contestants participated in a final round of on-stage interviews, and cut to the final top three before the runners-up were announced and the new Miss Universe named.

=== Selection committee ===
==== Final telecast ====
- Carlos Arturo Zapata – Colombian fashion designer
- Florence LaRue – American singer and original member of The 5th Dimension
- Richard Dalton – Princess Diana's stylist and confidante
- Beulah Quo – Chinese-American actress
- Emilio T. Yap – Publisher and Business tycoon
- Stephanie Beacham – English actress
- Jonas McCord – American screenwriter, director and producer
- Mona Grudt – Miss Universe 1990 from Norway

== Contestants ==
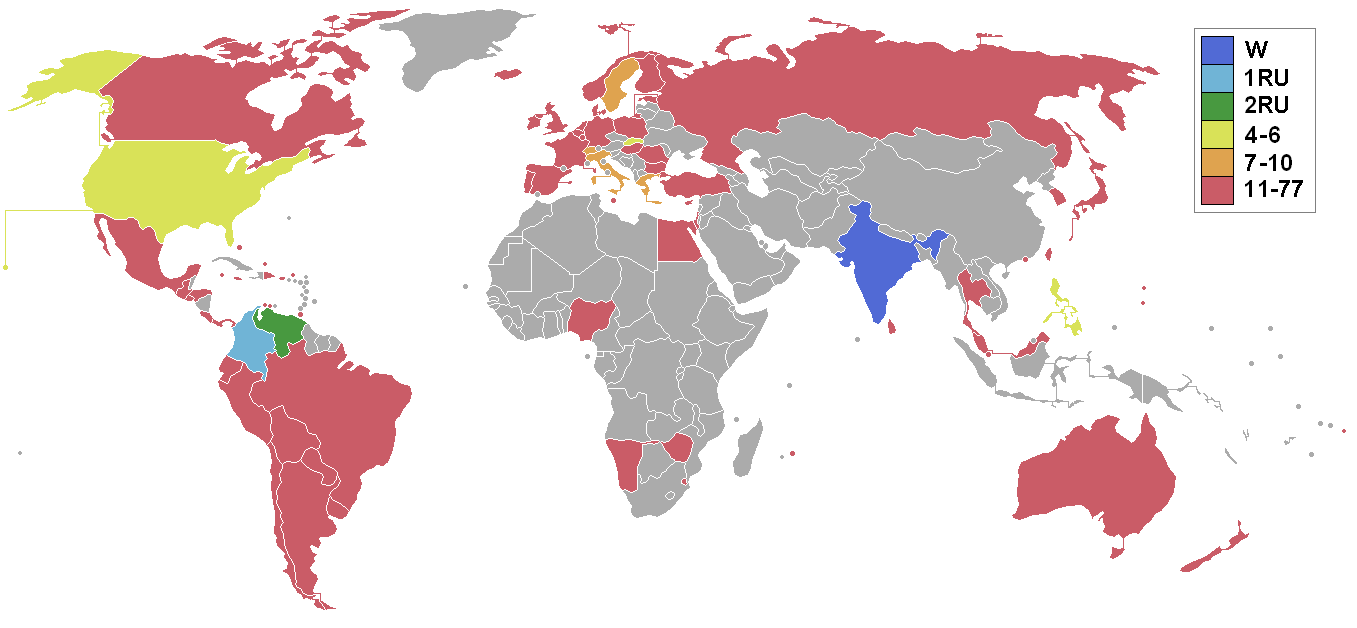
Miss Universe 1994 participating countries and territories

Seventy-seven contestants competed for the title.

Country/Territory	Contestant	Age (Note: Ages at the time of the pageant)	Hometown
Argentina	Solange Magnano	22	Santa Fe
Aruba	Alexandra Ochoa	18	Oranjestad
Australia	Michelle van Eimeren	22	Brisbane
Bahamas	Meka Knowles	18	Nassau
Belgium	Christelle Roelandts	19	Waremme
Bolivia	Cecilia O'Connor-d'Arlach	23	La Paz
Brazil	Valéria Melo Peris	23	Conchal
British Virgin Islands	Delia Jon Baptiste	18	Road Town
Bulgaria	Nevena Marinova	20	Sofia
Canada	Susanne Rothfos	18	Dawson Creek
Cayman Islands	Audrey Ebanks	20	Grand Cayman
Chile	Constanza Barbieri	18	Santiago
Colombia	Carolina Gómez	19	Bogotá
Cook Islands	Leilani Brown	18	Rarotonga
Costa Rica	Yasmin Camacho	23	San José
Curaçao	Jasmin Clifton	26	Willemstad
Cyprus	Maria Vasiliou	19	Nicosia
Denmark	Gitte Andersen	25	Copenhagen
Dominican Republic	Vielka Valenzuela	21	Concepción de la Vega
Ecuador	Mafalda Arboleda	18	Guayaquil
Egypt	Ghada El-Salem	20	Cairo
El Salvador	Claudia Méndez	22	San Salvador
Estonia	Eva-Maria Laan	19	Tallinn
Finland	Henna Meriläinen	19	Tohmajärvi
France	Valerie Claisse	21	Saint-Nazaire
Germany	Tanja Wild	21	Baden-Württemberg
Great Britain	Michaela Pyke	22	Kent
Greece	Rea Toutounzi	20	Athens
Guam	Christina Perez	20	Agana
Guatemala	Katya Schoenstedt	20	Guatemala City
Honduras	Jem Haylock	23	Guanaja
Hong Kong	Mok Hoi-Yan	24	Hong Kong
Hungary	Szilvia Forian	21	Karcag
Iceland	Svala Björk Arnardóttir	18	Reykjavík
India	Sushmita Sen	18	New Delhi
Ireland	Pamela Flood	22	Dublin
Israel	Ravit Yarkoni	21	Givatayim
Italy	Arianna David	20	Rome
Jamaica	Angelie Martin	19	Saint James
Japan	Chiaki Kawahito	21	Tokyo
Luxembourg	Sandy Wagner	20	Luxembourg City
Malaysia	Liza Koh	20	Kuala Lumpur
Malta	Paola Camilleri	19	Fleur-de-Lys
Mauritius	Viveka Babajee	20	Port Louis
Mexico	Fabiola Pérez Rovirosa	18	Chihuahua
Namibia	Barbara Kahatjipara	21	Windhoek
Netherlands	Irene van de Laar	25	Leiden
New Zealand	Nicola Brighty	21	Auckland
Nigeria	Suzan Hart	18	Benue
Northern Mariana Islands	Elizabeth Tomokane	21	Saipan
Norway	Caroline Saetre	18	Møre og Romsdal
Panama	María Sofía Velásquez	23	Panama City
Paraguay	Liliana González	23	Asunción
Peru	Karina Calmet	24	La Molina
Philippines	Charlene Gonzales	20	Quezon City
Poland	Joanna Brykczynska	21	Western Pomerania
Portugal	Mónica Pereira	20	Lisbon
Puerto Rico	Brenda Robles	18	Isabela
Republic of China	Joanne Wu	25	Taipei
Romania	Mihaela Ciolacu	20	Bucharest
Russia	Inna Zobova	20	Khimki
Singapore	Alien Sun	21	Singapore
Slovakia	Silvia Lakatošová	20	Bratislava
South Korea	Goong Sun-young	21	Seoul
Spain	Raquel Rodríguez	20	Córdoba
Sri Lanka	Nushara Pramali	19	Colombo
Swaziland	Nicola Smith	20	Mbabane
Sweden	Domenique Forsberg	25	Kiruna
Switzerland	Patricia Fässler	19	Zürich
Thailand	Areeya Chumsai	22	Bangkok
Trinidad and Tobago	Lorca Gatcliffe	24	Port of Spain
Turkey	Banu Usluer	19	Istanbul
Turks and Caicos Islands	Eulease Walkin	23	Providenciales
United States	Lu Parker	26	Charleston
Uruguay	Leonora Dibueno	27	Montevideo
Venezuela	Minorka Mercado	22	Caracas
Zimbabwe	Yvette D'Almeida-Chakras	22	Harare

== Contestants Notes ==
=== Debuts ===
- Russia – attended for the first time, after separating from Soviet Union. Inna Zobova was the winner of Miss Russia in 1993, which was the national pageant.
- Slovakia attended for the first time, after separating from Czechoslovakia. Silvia Lakatošova was the winner of Miss Czech and Slovak Republic in 1993, which was the national pageant together with the Czech Republic.
- Zimbabwe

=== Returns ===
Last competed in 1992:

- Cook Islands
- Egypt
- Republic of China — Joanne Wu was allowed to wear Republic of China sash while she was off-staged. There were two sashes for her, one was written (Taiwan) R.O.C., and the other was written Republic of China as stated above.

=== Replacements ===
- El Salvador – Eleonora Carrillo, Miss El Salvador 1994 couldn't take part due she was underage before February 1. Her 1st—Runner up, Claudia Méndez was sent for the event, although Carrillo competed the following year at the Miss Universe 1995 finishing in the Top 10.

=== Withdrawals ===
- Austria — Bianca Engel
- Belize
- Czech Republic — the country's national pageant was held together with Slovakia for a special occasion after the dissolution of Czechoslovakia.
- Ghana
- Lebanon — Lara Badawi
- Nicaragua — Karen Celebertti
- Suriname
- United States Virgin Islands — Jessalyn Pearsall

=== Did not compete ===
- Lithuania — Loreta Brusokaitė – withdrew for unknown reasons. Lithuania would make its debut at Miss Universe 2012.

=== Observations ===
- Indonesia – Venna Melinda was not allowed to compete in the pageant because of her country's conservative Islamic prejudice towards the swimsuit competition, though she eventually traveled to Manila to watch the pageant instead.
