= Intec College =

Intec College is a distance education centre located in South Africa.

Intec's parent company, Educor, had four sister colleges deregistered by the government of South Africa in March 2024. The complaints were about poor quality of teaching and learning; lack of proper administrative support; poorly qualified staff; corruption and bribery; lack of response for requests for refunds and lack of professionalism. In the deregistration notice, the Minister of Higher Education Blade Nzimande noted that the complaints "extend to the other brands such as INTEC College".

== Sources ==
- Official Site
