= Damelin Correspondence College =

Coordinates: 33.89215°S 18.51754°E

- Type: Private Correspondence College
- Established: 1955; 71 years ago
- Endowment: R34,5 million (2008)
- Students: 4,402 (2008)
- Website: dcc.edu.za

Damelin Correspondence College is a South African private correspondence college, owned by private tertiary education institution holding company Educor. It was founded in 1955 by Johann Brumer, a teacher who started his career at Damelin and started developing long distance study materials.

The college offers diplomas and certificates under six schools: the Business School, Computer School, General School, Technical School and Vocational School.
