= Michelle McLean =

Namibian model

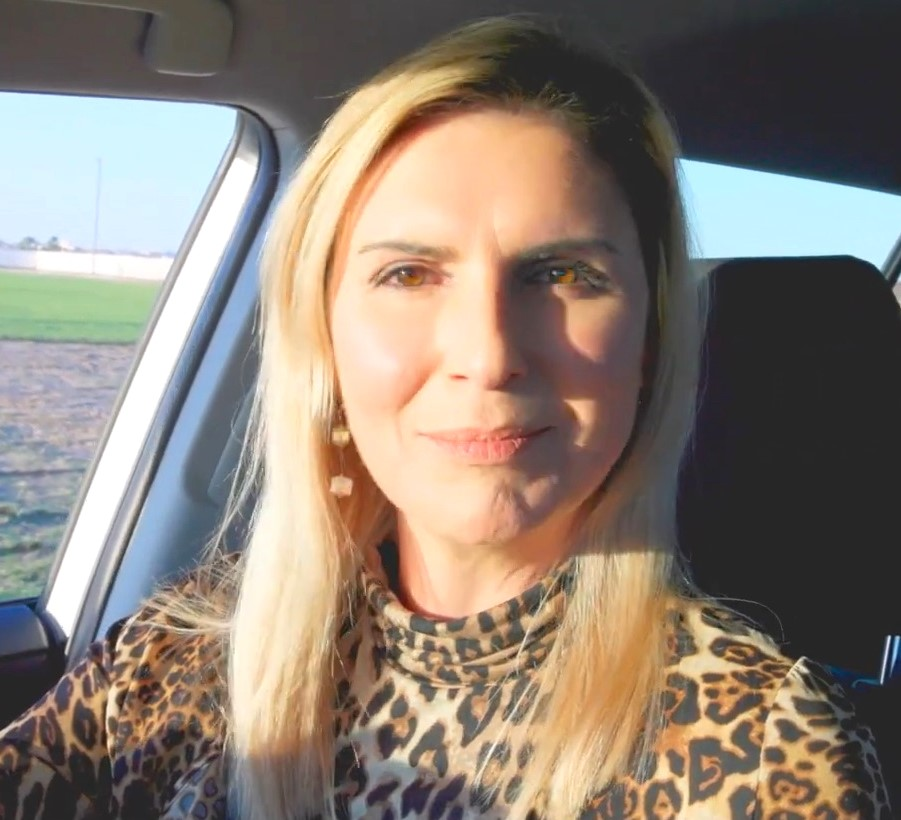
- MacLean in 2021
- Born: 31 July 1972 (age 54); Windhoek, South West Africa (now Namibia)
- Height: 6 ft 0 in (1.83 m)
- Spouse: Neil Bierbaum (div. 2006) Gary Bailey (m. 2013)
- Children: 1
- Beauty pageant titleholder
- Title: Miss Namibia 1991; Miss Universe 1992
- Hair color: Blonde
- Eye color: Hazel
- Major competitions: Miss Namibia 1991 (Winner); Miss World 1991 (Top 5); Miss Universe 1992 (Winner)
- Website: www.mmct.org.na

Michelle McLean (born 31 July 1972) is a Namibian actress, writer, model and beauty queen who was crowned Miss Universe 1992 in Thailand. McLean was 19 years old when she was crowned Miss Universe, and became the first, and so far only, Namibian woman, as well as the second African one, to win the title. McLean had been crowned Miss Namibia 1991 before Miss Universe, and also placed as the fourth runner-up at Miss World 1991.

== Early life ==
At the age of 13, Michelle McLean entered the world of international modelling, being crowned Miss Namibia in 1991 and reaching the all-time high as Miss Universe, crowned in Bangkok, Thailand, in 1992 - at the age of 19.

== Pageantry ==
Michelle McLean began her modeling career at a young age while growing up in Windhoek, Namibia. Before competing in Miss Universe, McLean competed in Miss World 1991. In the preliminary competition she was tied in second place with a score of 51 along with Miss South Africa, behind the eventual winner, Venezuela's Ninibeth Leal; McLean eventually finished in the top 5.

McLean was crowned in the 1992 Miss Universe pageant in Bangkok, Thailand. She is the first and only Namibian women to win the Miss Universe title. In the 1992 Miss Universe pageant she finished second in the preliminary with a score of 9.147, right behind Carolina Izsak of Venezuela, who won all three preliminary competitions. Nonetheless, McLean's warmth and love for children helped clinch the crown over Izsak, Paola Turbay of Colombia, and Madhushri Sapre of India.

== Life after Miss Universe ==
After winning Miss Universe, the attention she gained also provided attention for Namibia. This began opening opportunities for her social media presence, her business, as well as philanthropy. Michelle described her experience in pageantry as transformative; it opened many opportunities for her such as helping her establish the Michelle McLean Children Trust in 1992, which supports education as well as community development programs across Namibia. McLean grew from pageantry to providing for her country. “I am an example of a woman who was destined to be just a beauty queen, but through Sam Nujoma’s guidance I was able to contribute to the upliftment of underserved communities and education for children throughout Namibia since 1992.”

McLean campaigns for charities, notably The Michelle McLean Children Trust in Namibia and the Michelle McLean Primary School, also in Namibia, which has 890 students. The Michelle McLean Children's Trust in Namibia, which focuses on the education and care of under-privileged children, was founded in 1992 and has raised over 50 million dollars to help children in her native Namibia, in Southern Africa.

Michelle was instrumental in bringing the Miss Universe pageant to her country in 1995. In 2009 Michelle co-hosted the Miss World pageant held in South Africa. In 2018, McLean formed part of the selection committee of the Miss Universe 2018. She was part of the jury for Ms International World 2021.

Apart from modeling, Michelle McLean-Bailey has been a professional speaker for over 20 years, and has hosted numerous international events, like the Global Forum, the World Economic Forum, Soccer World Cup, the Louis Vuitton Regatta and Opera at the Pyramids.

== Personal life ==
Michelle married Neil Bierbaum in 1998. They had a son together, Luke McLean Bierbaum in 1999. They divorced in 2006.

Michelle McLean and former Manchester United goalkeeper Gary Bailey married on 9 March 2013.

Awards and achievements
| Preceded by (Mexico) Lupita Jones | Miss Universe; 1992 | Succeeded by (Puerto Rico) Dayanara Torres |
| Preceded by Ronel Liebenberg | Miss Namibia; 1991 | Succeeded by Anja Schröder |
