= Tim Modise =

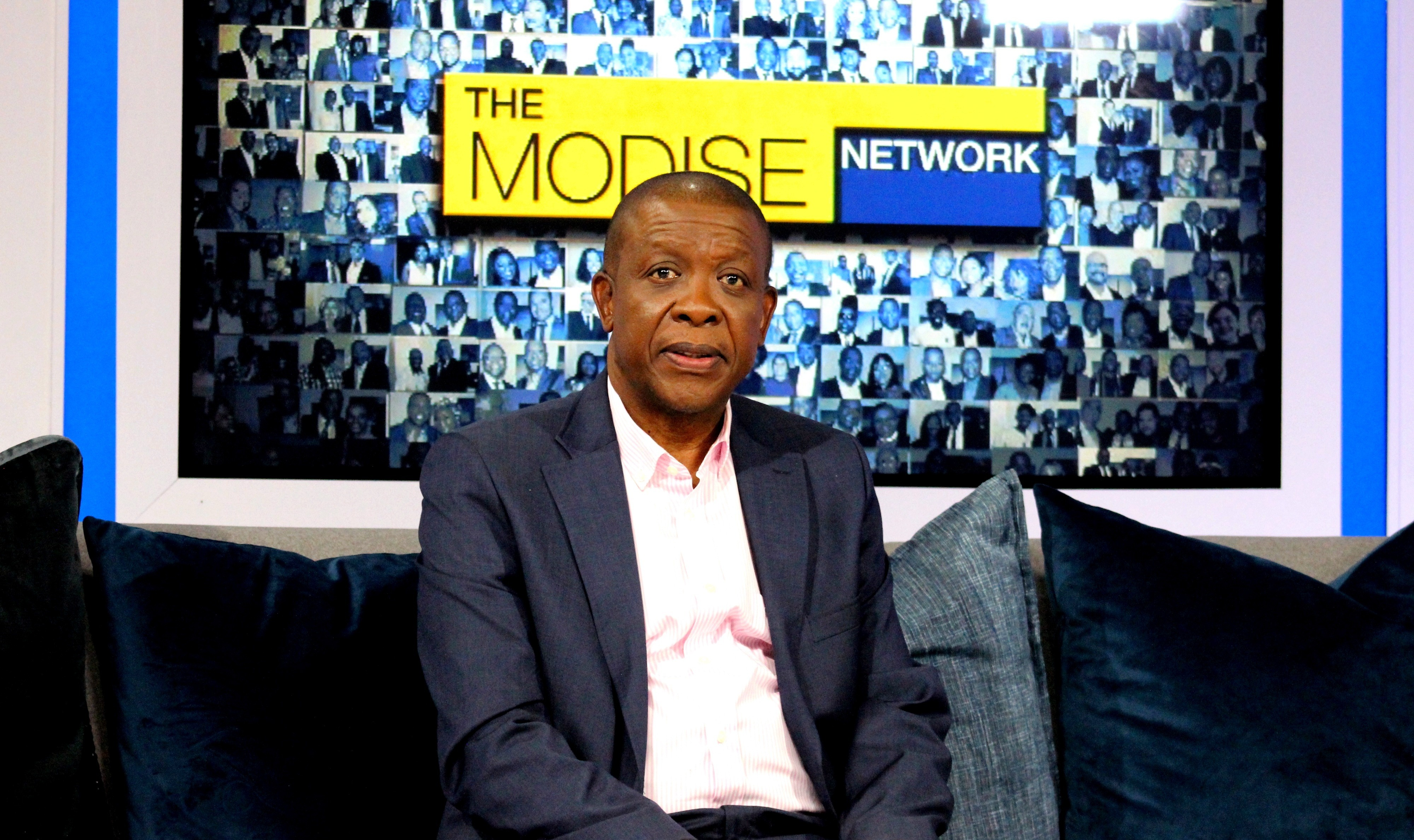
Tim Modise hosting one of his talk shows on South African television. This image was taken at the eNCA Studios in Hyde Park, Johannesburg during the shooting of The Modise Network.

Timothy Modise is a South African veteran journalist, broadcaster, public speaker and philanthropist. Boasting over thirty years in broadcast media and journalism, Modise has worked for various radio and TV stations of the SABC, M-Net, Primedia, BBC and Power FM across different formats from music, current affairs and talk shows. He was inducted in the Radio Hall of Fame in 2011.

== Broadcasting ==
Although grounded in the music formatted stations for five years of his early broadcasting career, the veteran journalist transitioned to the talk format in 1988. He later introduced politically oriented talk, participating extensively in the coverage of the transition from 'apartheid' to the new 'constitutional democracy', reporting and commenting on the unbanning of the ANC and other liberation movements, the release of political prisoners, the uprisings, and subsequent negotiations that ushered in the South Africa of today. He provided voter education on his programmes, hosted the debates leading to the elections of 1994 which he also covered on both radio and TV. His highlight was being a panelist on the Mandela/De Klerk debate which was broadcast to a global audience of 800 million. He has interviewed all South African Presidents since 1990.

He continues to cover South African public affairs and through his company FGPMedia, produces his own TV shows as well as his radio show on @touchhdonline. Tim Modise hosts his own current affairs shows on eNCA called ‘The Modise Network ‘ and another on Soweto TV called Tonight with Tim Modise. He also promotes entrepreneurship with research company Plus94 Research, collaborating on their support platform called BizNexus.

== Other work ==
Tim Modise has also worked as a political analyst for AMB Securities & HSBC, a columnist for City Press newspaper and was appointed the founding chairman of Proudly South African by President Thabo Mbeki. He briefly worked as Chief Communications Officer of 2010 World Cup and later became CEO of Sizwe IT, a technology company. He has started a digital publication called Modise.net to promote entrepreneurship and the South African economy. He is a public speaker who has also given keynote speeches at graduation ceremonies of universities of Cape Town, Tshwane, UNISA and Wits. He has moderated and facilitated a variety of conferences and MC’d major events including Cape Town Jazz, Mandela 85 Birthday Ubuntu Awards & the Loerie Awards with Fran Drescher and Louis Gossett Jr. He is involved in education and health sectors in his home community of Garankuwa as patron of the Tim Modise Primary School, member of Sefako Makgatho University and board member of George Mukhari Hospital.

== Recognition ==
He has received numerous awards for community development, communication, broadcasting, reconciliation from IJR & Archbishop Tutu as well as for human rights from the Jaime Brunet Foundation, University of Navarro in Spain.

== Education and personal life ==
He obtained Advanced Management Diploma (AMP) from Henley Business School, Marketing Certificate UNISA, Financial Management Diploma from Damelin. Modise lives with his children in Kyalami, Johannesburg and enjoys music and reading biographies, world current affairs and developments.
