= David Nosworthy =

South African cricketer

David Nosworhty
Personal information
- Full name: David Owen Nosworthy
- Born: 25 December 1967 (age 58); Johannesburg, Transvaal Province, South Africa
- Batting: Right-handed
- Bowling: Right-arm medium, off break
- Role: Batsman

Domestic team information
- Years: Team
- 1989–1991: Northern Transvaal
- 1991–1996: Border
- FC debut: 8 December 1988 South African Defence Force v Boland
- Last FC: 15 December 1995 Border B v Western Transvaal
- LA debut: 18 October 1991 Border v Northern Transvaal
- Last LA: 24 February 1995 Border v Western Province

Career statistics
Competition	FC	LA
Matches	29	14
Runs scored	1,451	244
Batting average	28.45	24.40
100s/50s	1/8	0/2
Top score	141*	69
Balls bowled	110	–
Wickets	1	–
Bowling average	69.00	–
5 wickets in innings	0	–
10 wickets in match	0	n/a
Best bowling	1/57	–
Catches/stumpings	9/–	1/–
- Source: CricketArchive, 28 February 2013

David Owen Nosworthy (born 25 December 1967) is a South African former cricketer. A right-handed batsman and occasional right-arm medium and off break bowler, he enjoyed modest success as a player playing 29 first-class matches and 14 list A games, but has made his name as a coach and his portfolio of first-class coaching roles include the South African franchises Highveld Lions and Nashua Titans, in New Zealand with Canterbury and in England with Somerset.

== Early years and playing career ==
Nosworthy was born in Johannesburg, South Africa, on Christmas Day, 1967, and took up cricket at a young age whilst growing up in Johannesburg. He played cricket for Grey High School in Port Elizabeth where he broke the great batsman Graeme Pollock's record for the most runs in a school season. As a young player he played in England for Yorkshire club side Marsden CC.

Nosworthy made his first class debut in December 1988 for a South African Defence Force XI against Boland; the match was drawn with Nosworthy batting at number 3, scoring 14 and 5. It took Nosworthy a further two seasons to record his first first-class half century, scoring 85 for Northern Transvaal B against Natal B in December 1990. Nosworthy moved from Northern Transvaal to Border cricket team at the end of the 1990/91 season. Nosworthy made the only first-class century of his career whilst captaining the Border B side against Easterns in November 1995, playing in a team including future South Africa test wicket-keeper Mark Boucher, Nosworthy scored 141 not out in his side's draw in match which turned out to be his second last first-class game.

== Coaching career ==
After retiring from playing he delved into the business world for a few years, before in 2000 taking up a coaching role with the Pretoria based franchise, the Nashua Titans where he led them to two T20 trophies and numerous finals. During his time with the Titans he was also appointed as the South Africa U19 Head Coach on a tour to England and the South Africa A team Head Coach in a series against the Sri Lankans. Nosworthy left the Titans in March 2005, and following this was briefly the head coach of the United Cricket Board's (now Cricket South Africa) National Academy.

Nosworthy then left South Africa for New Zealand where he in July 2005 he was appointed head coach of the Canterbury cricket team, Nosworthy lead the team to a State Championship title in 2007–08 and victories in the State Shield and the Twenty20 competition in 2005–06. In 2007, Nosworthy was appointed as the coach for the New Zealand A team tour to Australia as part of the Emerging Players tournament. In June 2007 it was also reported that Nosworthy had applied for the Indian national team position.

On 16 June 2008, Nosworthy quit as head coach of Canterbury to take charge of South African franchise the Johannesburg-based Highveld Lions, with Nosworthy explaining that "opportunity to coach a South African first-class side at one of the world's best Test venues was too good to turn down." Nosworthy spent four years with the Lions before in June 2012 resigning his post 11 months before the end of his contract, although he did not win a trophy during his time with the Lions they reached two Twenty20 finals and qualified for the Champions League Twenty20 on two occasions.

In December 2012, Nosworthy was appointed as Somerset County Cricket Club's Director of Cricket, following Brian Rose who stepped down at the end of the 2012 season. On 29 August 2014, Somerset announced that Nosworthy was to leave his position at the end of the 2014 season.
