= John Harris (activist) =

South African schoolteacher and anti-apartheid campaigner who turned to terrorism

- Born: 4 July 1937; South Africa
- Died: 1 April 1965 (aged 27); Pretoria Central Prison, South Africa
- Occupation: Schoolteacher
- Known for: Anti-apartheid activism
- Children: Lynn Harris Ballen
- Status: Executed by hanging
- Conviction: Murder
- Penalty: Death

Frederick John Harris (4 July 1937 – 1 April 1965) was a South African schoolteacher and anti-apartheid campaigner who turned to activism and was executed after a bomb attack on a railway station. He was Chairman of SANROC (the South African Non Racial Olympic Committee), which in 1964 petitioned the International Olympic Committee to have South Africa excluded from the Olympics for fielding a white-only team. After being arrested for his political activities, he became a member of the African Resistance Movement (ARM).

== Crime ==
On 24 July 1964, Harris telephoned the Johannesburg Railway Police to inform them that a bomb had been planted on a whites-only platform of Johannesburg Park Station. The bomb exploded shortly afterwards, killing a 77-year-old woman and injuring 23 others.

== Trial and execution ==
Harris was represented at trial by David Soggot, who later became one of South Africa's most prominent civil rights lawyers. Harris was convicted of murder, and hanged on 1 April 1965. He went to the gallows singing "We Shall Overcome", a Civil Rights Movement protest song.

== Legacy ==
A memorial to remember Harris's life was held around the 40th anniversary of his death at Freedom Park in Pretoria.

Harris was the only white person executed for crimes committed in resistance to apartheid. All those executed for such crimes were honoured by South Africa's president on the occasion of the launch of the Gallows Museum at the C Max Pretoria Central Correctional Centre on 15 December 2011:

"The 134 men were terrorists or trouble makers to the authorities then. But to their people and families, they were freedom fighters who wanted to see a free, democratic and non-sexist South Africa." —Jacob Zuma

== Notes and references ==
- Okoth, Assa (2006). A History of Africa: African nationalism and the de-colonisation process. East African Publishers. ISBN 978-9966-25-358-3.
- Herbstein, Denis (2004). White Lies: Canon Collins and the Secret War Against Apartheid. James Currey Publishers. ISBN 978-0-85255-885-0.
- Wetmore, Kevin J. (2001). The Athenian Sun in an African Sky: Modern African Adaptations of Classical Greek Tragedy. McFarland. ISBN 978-0-7864-1093-4.
