= Department of Higher Education and Training =

South African government department

Department overview
- Formed: 2009
- Preceding Department: Department of Education
- Jurisdiction: Government of South Africa
- Headquarters: Pretoria; 25°45′00″S 28°11′03″E
- Annual budget: R 149.23 billion (2026/27)
- Ministers responsible: Blade Nzimande, Minister of Higher Education and Training; Buti Manamela, Deputy Minister of Higher Education and Training
- Department executive: Gwebinkundla Qonde, Acting Director-General: Higher Education and Training
- Key document: South African Higher Education Act, 1997
- Website: www.dhet.gov.za

The Department of Higher Education and Training is one of the departments of the South African government. It oversees universities and other post-secondary education in South Africa. It was created in 2009 after the election of President Jacob Zuma, when the former Department of Education was divided.

The political head of the department is the Minister of Higher Education and Training; as of February 2018 this is Naledi Pandor. The department is headquartered in Pretoria in what used to be known as Sol Plaatje House, named after the author and political activist Sol Plaatje. The name Sol Plaatje House is now used for the new Department of Basic Education building.

The Department issues a journal rank called "List of Approved South African Journals", used as a criterion for South African scholars and scientists to receive recognition for their academic publishing productivity and for journal editors and publishers to receive monetary compensation from the government.

== See also ==
- South African Qualifications Authority (SAQA)
