= List of University of South Africa people =

This list of University of South Africa people includes notable alumni, faculty, administrators, and affiliates of the University of South Africa.

== Notable alumni and faculty ==
- Jean-Bertrand Aristide, Haitian politician, received a Doctor of Literature and Philosophy (D.Litt. et Phil.) in African Languages in 2007
- Walter Battiss, South African abstract painter, received a Bachelor of Fine Arts in 1942 Honorary and an honorary Doctor of Literature and Philosophy (D.Litt. et Phil. Honoris Causa) in 1973
- Dianne Lynne Bevelander, South African academic and activist
- Edwin Cameron, judge of the Constitutional Court of South Africa, received a Bachelor of Laws (LL.B. Cum Laude) in 1981
- Ergun Caner, Swedish Evangelical and Southern Baptist apologist, received a Doctor of Theology (D.Th.) in 2000
- Lazarus M. Chakwera, received a Master of Theology in 1991, Head of State, Republic of Malawi
- Alan Clark, former CEO of SABMiller, received a Doctor of Literature and Philosophy in Psychology
- Johan Froneman, judge of the Constitutional Court of South Africa, received a Bachelor of Laws (LL.B.) in 1977
- King George V, received an Honorary Doctor of Laws (LL.D. Honoris Causa) in 1899, two years prior to becoming Chancellor of the university
- Denis Goldberg, anti-apartheid activist: Public Administration, Library Science, History and Geography, between 1965 and 1985.
- Pravin Gordhan, former South African Minister of Finance, received an Honorary Doctor of Commerce (D.Com. Honoris Causa) in 2007
- Elson Kaseke, the former Solicitor-General of Belize, received a Doctor of Laws (LL.D.) in 2006
- Ahmed Kathrada, former South African politician, received a Bachelor of Arts (B.A.) in Criminology and History in 1968 and a Bachelor of Bibliography (B.Bibl.) in African Politics and Library Science in 1975
- F. W. de Klerk, former State President of South Africa, received an Honorary Doctor of Laws (LL.D. Honoris Causa) in 1995
- Johann Kriegler, judge of the Constitutional Court of South Africa
- Desmond Krogh, professor of economics from 1962 to 1969
- Pius Langa, former Chief Justice of South Africa, received a Bachelor of Jurisprudence (B.Iuris) in 1973 and a Bachelor of Laws (LL.B.) in 1976
- Nelson Mandela, former president of the Republic of South Africa, received a Bachelor of Arts (B.A.) in 1942 and a Bachelor of Laws (LL.B.) in 1988
- Gwede Mantashe, South African politician, received a Bachelor of Commerce (B.Com.) in 1997 and a Bachelor of Commerce Honours (B.Com. (Hons)) in 2002
- Trevor Manuel, South African politician, received an Honorary Doctor of Technology (D.Tech. Honoris Causa) in 2002
- Anja Marais, South African sculptor, received a Bachelor of Fine Arts Honour's (B.F.A. (Hons)) in 1998
- Mogoeng Mogoeng, current Chief Justice of South Africa, received a Master of Laws (LL.M.) in 1989
- Dikgang Moseneke, former Deputy Chief Justice of South Africa, received a Bachelor of Arts (B.A.) in English and Political Science, a Bachelor of Jurisprudence (B.Iuris), a Bachelor of Laws (LL.B.), and an Honorary Doctor of Laws (LL.D. Honoris Causa) in 2011
- Robert Mugabe, former President of Zimbabwe, received a Bachelor of Education by correspondence
- Peya Mushelenga, Namibian Minister of Rural and Urban Development obtained BA Honours and an MA in International Politics in 1997 and 2009, respectively, and a D Litt et Phil in 2015.
- Bulelani Ngcuka, former Director of Public Prosecutions of South Africa, received a Bachelor of Laws (LL.B.) in 1985
- Georgia Papageorge, South African installation artist, received a Bachelor of Arts (B.A.) in Fine Arts in 1979
- Mark Pilgrim, South African radio and television personality, received a Bachelor of Commerce (B.Com.) in Industrial & Organisational Psychology in 1994
- Cyril Ramaphosa, current president of Republic of South Africa, received a Baccalaureus Procurationis (B.Proc.) in 1981
- Mamphela Ramphele, former South African politician, received a Bachelor of Commerce (B.Com.) in Administration in 1983
- Desmond Tutu, Anglican cleric and theologian known for his work as an anti-apartheid and human rights activist. Winner of the Nobel Peace Prize. BA 1954
- Justice Raymond Zondo, judge of the Constitutional Court of South Africa, received a Master of Laws (LL.M.) in Commercial Law, a Master of Laws (LL.M.) in Labour Law, and a Master of Laws (LL.M.) in Patent Law
- Angelique Rockas actress, producer and activist, creator of Internationalist Theatre London, pioneer of multi-racial and multi-national productions of European classics

== Chancellors, vice-chancellors, and principals of the university ==
=== Vice-chancellors of the University of the Cape of Good Hope, from 1873 to 1918 ===
- Langham Dale, 1873 – 1877; 1879 – 1882; 1884 – 1889
- Charles Abercrombie Smith, 1877 – 1879; 1905 – 1911
- Hopkins Badnall, 1882 – 1884
- Charles Thomas Smith, 1889 – 1893
- George Ogilvie, 1893 – 1897
- Thomas Muir, 1897 – 1901
- Ebenezer John Buchanan, 1901 – 1905
- Thomas Walker, 1911 – 1913
- William Ritchie, 1913 – 1916
- Malcolm William Searle, 1916 – 1918

=== Chancellors of the University of South Africa from 1918 to the present ===
- Prince Arthur, Duke of Connaught and Strathearn, 1918 – 1942
- Nicolaas Jacobus de Wet, 1943 – 1951
- Gerhardus Jacobus Maritz, 1951 – 1957
- Francois Jean de Villiers, 1957 – 1977
- Victor Gustav Hiemstra, 1977 – 1987
- vacant 1988
- Theo van Wijk, 1989 – 1990
- Christoph Friedrich Garbers, September 1990 – 2000
- Bernard Ngoepe, 2001–2016
- Thabo Mbeki, 2016 – present

=== Vice-chancellors of the University of South Africa, 1918 to 1955 ===
- Willem Jacobus Viljoen, 1918 – 1922
- John Ernest Adamson, 1922 – 1926
- John Daniel Kestell, 1926 – 1928
- Hugh Bryan, 1928 – 1930
- Nicolaas Marais Hoogenhout, 1930 – 1932
- Samuel Henri Pellissier, 1932 – 1934
- Marthinus Christoffel Botha, 1934 -1936
- François Daniël Hugo, 1936 – 1938
- François Stephanus Malan, 1938 – 1940
- Ferdinand Postma, 1940 – 1944
- Alfred Adrian Roberts, 1944 – 1946
- Herman Heinrich Gerhard Kreft, 1946 – 1948
- Albertus Johannes Roux van Rhijn, 1948 – 1952
- Stephanus Petrus Erasmus Boshoff, 1952 – 1955

=== Principals and vice-chancellors of the University of South Africa, 1953 to the present ===
- Andries Jacobus Hendrik Johannes Van der Walt, Principal, 1953 – 1955
- Andries Jacobus Hendrik Johannes Van der Walt, Principal and Vice-Chancellor, 1956
- Samuel Pauw, Principal and Vice-Chancellor, 1956 – 1972
- Theo van Wijk, Principal and Vice-Chancellor, 1972 – 1988
- Jan Casper Gerhardus Janse van Vuuren, Principal and Vice-Chancellor, 1989 – 1993
- Marinus Wiechers, Principal and Vice-Chancellor, 1994 – 1997
- Antony Patrick Melck, Principal and Vice-Chancellor, 1998 (acting) and 1999 – 2001
- Nyameko Barney Pityana, Principal and Vice-Chancellor, 2002 – 2010
- Mandla Makhanya, Principal and Vice-Chancellor, 2011–2021
- Puleng LenkaBula, Principal and Vice-Chancellor, 2021–present
