= Kentridge and Dumas in Conversation =

2009 South African documentary film

- Directed by: Catherine Meyburgh
- Produced by: Liza Essers; Jason Hoff
- Starring: William Kentridge; Marlene Dumas
- Edited by: Catherine Meyburgh
- Music by: Philip Miller
- Release date: 2009
- Running time: 71 minutes
- Countries: South Africa; United States; Netherlands
- Language: English

Kentridge and Dumas in Conversation is a 2009 South African documentary biographical film written and directed by Catherine Meyburgh. It was jointly produced by Liza Essers and Jason Hoff.

The film centers on the real life stories of South African contemporary artists William Kentridge and Marlene Dumas who are also well known as popular artists in international contemporary art. The film shows them in discussion regarding drawing, painting and filmmaking. The film was screened at the 2009 Encounters Documentary Film Festival.

== Cast ==
- William Kentridge as himself
- Marlene Dumas as herself
