= Catherine Meyburgh =

South African filmmaker and film editor

- Occupations: film director, editor, projection designer, artist
- Years active: 1983
- Known for: Dying for Gold

Catherine Meyburgh is a South African film editor, filmmaker, artist, and projection designer.

== Career ==
She started her career as a film editor in 1983 mainly focusing documentaries. She has served as an editor in over 30 documentaries which have been telecast on Arte, Channel 4, BBC and NBC. She worked as a film editor in animated films of prominent contemporary artist William Kentridge in 1990's. As a projection designer in theatre and opera, she has worked with fellow prominent artists including Leora Farber, Georgia Papageorge and Willem Boshoff. Her projection design has been displayed in various international exhibitions held in New York and Paris. She also initiated a project titled The Head & the Load collaborating with fellow artists William Kentridge, Philip Miller and Thuthuka Sibisi.

== Films ==
=== Kentridge & Dumas in Conversation ===
Her directorial Kentridge & Dumas in Conversation is based on the real stories of contemporary artists William Kentridge and Marlene Dumas. The film reveals two of them involve in discussion regarding drawing, painting and filmmaking.

=== Dying for Gold ===
She co-directed, co-produced and edited the film Dying for Gold with Namibian filmmaker Richard Pakleppa which depicts the untold real story about the mining in South Africa. The film describes the difficulties faced by miners when they involve in search for gold.

== Filmography ==
As Projection designer

- 1996 - UBU
- 2005 - The Magic Flute/Die Zauberflöte by Mozart
- 2005 - Black Box/Chamber Noire
- 2012 - The Refusal of Time and Refuse the Hour
- 2010 - The Nose by Shostakovitch
- 2015 - Lulu by Alban Berg
- 2016 - Bikohausen
- 2017 - Wozzeck by Alban Berg
- 2018 - The Head & the Load
- 2019 - Mining Bodies
- 2021 - Something this way comes

=== As editor ===
- 1988 - Space Mutiny
- 1988 - Tyger, Tyger burning bright
- 1988 - Namibia, no easy road to Freedom
- 1990 - Nowhere to Play
- 1992 - The Clay Ox
- 1994 - Soweto, a history
- 1997 - SABC 20 years, the untold story
- 1998 - Robert Sobukwe
- 1998 - Yizo Yizo 1
- 1998 - Weighing... and Wanting
- 1998 - Alan Paton's Beloved Country
- 1999 - Stereoscope
- 1999 - Portrait of a Young Man Drowning
- 2000 - The Guguletu Seven
- 2000 - Soul City
- 2000 - Sol Plaatje, A Man for Our Time
- 2001 - Yizo Yizo 2
- 2003 - 7 Fragments for Georges Méliès and Journey to the Moon
- 2003 - Sophiatown
- 2003 - Tide Table
- 2003 - Day for Night
- 2003 - Africa Rifting, lines of fire
- 2004 - Zero Tolerance
- 2005 - Crossing the Line
- 2006 - Heartlines
- 2006 - Angola: Saudades from the One who Loves You
- 2006 - The Bushman's Secrets
- 2006 - I am not me, the horse is not mine
- 2007 - The Glow of White Women
- 2007 - REwind: A Cantata for Voice, Tape & Testimony
- 2007 - What will come (has already come)
- 2008 - Gugu and Andile
- 2008 - Bloodlines
- 2009 - For which I am Prepared to Die
- 2009 - Kentridge and Dumas in Conversation
- 2009 - Breathe, Dissolve & Return
- 2011 - Other Faces
- 2011 - Bettie
- 2012 - Taste of Rain
- 2013 - Nelson Mandela: The Myth and Me
- 2014 - Body Games/Jogo de Corpo
- 2014 - When we were Black 2
- 2018 - Dying for Gold
- 2020 - Deliver Me
- 2021 - Ghosted Matter
- 2021 – 1001 days

=== As director ===
- 1992 - The Clay Ox
- 1998 - Alan Paton's Beloved Country
- 2008 - Viva Madiba, a hero for all seasons
- 2009 - Kentridge and Dumas in Conversation
- 2011 - Bettie
- 2018 - Dying for Gold

As Producer/co-producer

- 1992 - The Clay Ox
- 1998 - Alan Paton's Beloved Country
- 2007 - The Glow of White Women
- 2012 - Taste of Rain
- 2018 - Dying for Gold]

Animation

- 2016 - The Takeover - David Koloane
- 2019 - Something out of nothing - David Koloane
- 2021 - Phantom Hurt
