= Mandela Makaula =

South African judge (born 1964)

The Honourable Mandela Makaula

Judge of the High Court
- Incumbent
- Assumed office 2010
- Appointed by: Jacob Zuma
- Division: Eastern Cape

Personal details
- Born: 6 May 1964 (age 62) KwaThema, Transvaal; South Africa
- Spouse: Khumsha Makaula
- Education: University of Transkei; Georgetown University

Mandela Makaula (born 6 May 1964) is a South African judge who is currently serving in the Eastern Cape Division of the High Court of South Africa. He joined the bench in 2010 after two decades in practice as an attorney and magistrate in the Eastern Cape. He was an acting judge in the Supreme Court of Appeal in 2022.

== Early life and education ==
Makaula was born on 6 May 1964 in KwaThema, a township outside Springs in the former Transvaal Province. However, he matriculated at Freemantle Boys School in Lady Frere in the Cape Province. Thereafter he attended the University of Transkei, completing a BJuris in 1986 and an LLB in 1989. He also holds an LLM from Georgetown University Law Center, completed in 1993.

== Legal career ==
While studying at the University of the Transkei, Makaula held a series of positions in the justice system. He began his career as a clerk in the Department of Justice and as an interpreter in the Magistrate's Court in Lady Frere, and he was a public prosecutor in the Lusikisiki Magistrate's Court while an LLB student from 1986 to 1988. After a brief stint as a legal planning advisor in the Department of Justice in Mthatha, he was appointed as a magistrate in the Libode Magistrate's Court later in 1988.

He served as a magistrate until 1990, when he served his articles of clerkship at Dukada and Company, a firm in Mthatha. He was admitted as an attorney in 1993 and practised through his own firm, Makaula, Zikwa and Company, for the next 17 years. He was an acting judge in the Eastern Cape Division of the High Court on several occasions from 2007 to 2010, and he was the chairperson of the Transkei Attorneys' Association from 2008 to 2009.

== Eastern Cape High Court: 2010–present ==
In April 2010, the Judicial Service Commission shortlisted and interviewed Makaula as a candidate for permanent appointment to the bench of the Eastern Cape High Court. After the interviews, he was recommended for appointment, which President Jacob Zuma confirmed the following month.

Among other prominent matters, Makaula presided in the trial of Timothy Omotoso, a Nigerian televangelist who was accused of human trafficking. The trial was delayed for a lengthy period after Makaula declined to recuse himself: the defendant appealed that decision unsuccessfully in the Supreme Court of Appeal and then in the Constitutional Court. However, while the appeal was pending before the Constitutional Court, Makaula announced that he would recuse himself from the matter. He explained that his wife ran a guesthouse where state witnesses had been accommodated and that he wished to avoid any "perceived bias in the future".

He was an acting judge in the Supreme Court of Appeal from January to September 2022. During that time, he wrote on behalf of the appellate court in judgements in Baloyi v S, a murder appeal, and in Sigcau v President of Republic of South Africa, in which the court denied Zanozuko Tyelovuyo Sigcau's claim to the amaMpondo throne.

== Nominations for elevation ==
In October 2015, Makaula interviewed unsuccessfully for the position of Deputy Judge President of the Eastern Cape Division. One-and-a-half years later, in April 2016, he interviewed for the more senior position of Judge President, but his interview was waylaid by criticism of his delays in delivering judgements. After those interviews, the Judicial Service Commission declined to recommend any of the four candidates for appointment, and Selby Mbenenge was ultimately appointed later that year.

In July 2022, the Judicial Service Commission announced that Makaula was one of ten candidates who had been shortlisted for five vacancies on the Supreme Court of Appeal bench. During his interview in October, Deputy Chief Justice Mandisa Maya pressed him at length about delays in his courtroom and the quality of his writing. He was not recommended for elevation.

== Personal life ==
He is married to Khumsha Makaula, with whom he has two children.
