= EX-TRTC United Workers Front v Premier, Eastern Cape Province =

South African legal case

EX-TRTC United Workers Front v Premier, Eastern Cape Province is an important case in South African law, heard and decided in the Eastern Cape High Court, Bhisho, on 25 February – 4 June 2009, respectively. T Delport (attorney) appeared for the plaintiffs, and Selby Mbenenge SC (with CTS Cossie) for the defendants.

The case has important implications for civil procedure in South Africa, with its determination that, although a voluntary association may, under the Uniform Rules of Court, sue or be sued in own name, this does not confer locus standi on the association where locus standi is otherwise lacking.

The court also held that whether or not an association amounts to a universitas is to be determined with reference to its nature and object and activities. A written constitution is in this regard desirable but not essential. Where the association is formed for a limited purpose, and would cease to exist once that purpose has been achieved, it lacks the object to have perpetual succession and to hold property separate from its members; it also lacks the essential element of a universitas.

== Facts ==
In an action in the High Court for damages for breach of contract, after a separation of issues, the court was asked to determine the question of the locus standi of the first plaintiff, described in the particulars as a voluntary association whose objective was "to represent its members in regard to their rights and interests emanating from their employment by and the closure of the Transkei Road Transport Corporation and to jointly [sic] institute legal proceedings to achieve" that objective. The plaintiff had no written constitution.

The defendant argued that the plaintiff lacked locus standi, because

- it was not a universitas;
- it did not have a constitution; and
- it did not have a direct and substantial interest in the subject-matter of the action.

Conversely, the plaintiffs argued that the first plaintiff was able to sue in its own name by virtue of the provisions of rule 14(2) of the Uniform Rules of Court. (Rule 14(1) defines a "firm" as "a business, including a business carried on by [...] the sole proprietor thereof under a name other than his own name," while Rule 14(2) allows such a firm to sue or be sued in its own name.)

== Judgment ==
The court held that rule 14(2) was nothing more than a procedural aid, in that it assisted a plaintiff to cite certain legal entities that did not have any existence separate from their members or owners. It did not turn a partnership, a firm or an unincorporated association into a different entity that existed separate from its members; nor did it vest it with locus standi where such was otherwise absent.

There was no merit, the court found, in the submission that the first plaintiff could not be a universitas because it did not possess a written constitution. Although advisable, it was not essential for a universitas to have a constitution. Accordingly, the mere fact that the first plaintiff had no written constitution was not determinative of the question of whether or not it had locus standi.

Whether or not the first plaintiff was a universitas, therefore, had to be decided with regard to its nature, its object and it activities. From a reading of the particulars of claim, it was clear to the court that the rights and interests referred to were those arising from a contract entered into between the defendant and a labour union (the Transport and General Workers Union) representing persons who were employed by the said corporation prior to its dissolution. The conclusion was inescapable: The first plaintiff was formed for a very limited purpose; once that purpose was achieved, there would be no further need for it, and it would cease to exist. The very object of the association negated an intention that it would have perpetual succession and hold property separate from its members. It was clearly unnecessary for the achievement of its purpose to possess those characteristics. The first plaintiff consequently lacked the requisites for a universitas.

The court held that an association could sue on behalf of its members under rule 14(2) only if there existed a sufficient nexus between the individual members, in their capacities as members of the association, and the right that formed the subject-matter of the litigation. Applied to the present matter, the first plaintiff did not institute the present proceedings to protect or enforce an interest which it had as a body or organisation; it did not propose to enforce those rights of its members which they possessed by reason of their membership of the association. The right to claim damages from the defendant for the alleged breach of contract was a personal right; it vested in each member of the association individually.

The plaintiffs, in deciding jointly to pursue their claims against the defendant, were consequently not an "association" of persons within the meaning of that word. Their intention was rather, having regard to the purpose of the first plaintiff and the nature of the relief claimed, to use the first plaintiff as a convenient vehicle to bring a representative action. Such an action did not exist in South African civil procedure.

The court concluded that it had not been shown on the pleadings that the first plaintiff had locus standi. The defendant's objection in that regard had to be upheld. The defendant's objection to the locus standi of the first plaintiff was consequently upheld and the first plaintiff's claims dismissed.

== See also ==
- Civil procedure in South Africa
- South African law of partnerships and trusts
