= S v Vika =

South African legal case

- Court: Eastern Cape High Court, Grahamstown
- Full case name: S v Vika
- Decided: 27 May 2010
- Citations: 2010 (2) SACR 444 (ECG); CA&R316/2009

Court membership
- Judges sitting: Roberson J and Pienaar AJ

Case opinions
- Decision by: Roberson J

Keywords
- Sentence, Prescribed sentence, Minimum sentence, Charge-sheet, Substantial and compelling circumstances, Untoxication, Murder, Attempted murder, Personal circumstances, Misdirection, Deterrence

S v Vika, an important case in South African criminal law, was heard on May 12, 2010. MM Xozwa, instructed by the Justice Centre, Grahamstown, appeared for the appellant; H. Obermeyer (DPP, Grahamstown) appeared for the State. The case was an appeal against sentence imposed in a regional court.

== Facts ==
The appellant was convicted in a regional court on two counts of contravening section 1(1) of the Criminal Law Amendment Act. The prohibited acts which constituted the contraventions were murder (of one Batandwa Ndalase) and attempted murder (of one Sandasile Nxiki), respectively. Regarding the appropriate punishment, the magistrate applied the provision that a contravention of section 1(1) could attract the same penalty as that which might be imposed for the unlawful act itself. He found that no substantial and compelling circumstances existed that would justify a sentence of less than the fifteen years' imprisonment stipulated in section 51(2) of the Criminal Law Amendment Act, and proceeded to impose that sentence, treating the two counts as one.

== Argument ==
The appellant appealed against the sentence on the grounds:

1. that no reference had been made in the charge-sheet to the provisions of the Criminal Law Amendment Act; and
2. that the sentence was startlingly inappropriate.

== Judgment ==
The High Court, having reserved judgment, held that it was clear from the address of the appellant's legal representative on sentence that she had been aware of the applicability of the minimum sentence provisions. She had submitted that substantial and compelling circumstances were present, and had not been surprised by the trial court's application of these provisions. Accordingly, the lack of reference thereto in the charge-sheet had not rendered the trial unfair.

In its judgment on sentence, the trial court had not mentioned the appellant's personal circumstances, and had dealt only with the seriousness of the offences. The magistrate seemed to the High Court not to have appreciated the difference between the offences of which the appellant had been convicted, and the offences of murder and attempted murder. These amounted to misdirections that entitled the High Court to interfere with sentence. The appellant had a clean record. His employment, for which he was pursuing higher qualifications, together with his support for his family, showed that he was a useful and responsible member of society. On the other hand, his actions had had serious consequences, including violent loss of life. There was also a high incidence of alcohol-related assaults in society. It was in society's interests that the courts be seen to impose sentences that would deter that kind of behaviour. A custodial sentence, the court found, was the only appropriate one. It emerged from a consideration of previous cases, however, that appreciably lower sentences were imposed than would have been if the relevant accused or appellants had been convicted of the underlying prohibited acts. In casu, a sentence of seven years' imprisonment on the first count, and four years on the second, was appropriate. Since the two offences had been closely linked in time and circumstance, the sentences should run concurrently.

The appeal was thus upheld: The sentence of fifteen years' imprisonment was set aside and replaced with one of seven years' and four years' imprisonment, running concurrently.

== See also ==
- South African criminal law
