= Vista University =

South African public university

- Type: Public
- Active: 1981–2000s
- Location: Pretoria, South Africa
- Campus: Urban

Vista University, South Africa was founded by the apartheid government to ensure that urban black South Africans seeking tertiary education would be accommodated within the townships rather than on campuses reserved for other population groups.

== Campuses ==
Its campuses were based in Bloemfontein, Daveyton (East Rand), Mamelodi, Port Elizabeth, Sebokeng, Soweto and Welkom. The administrative head office and the Distance Education Campus (VUDEC) were located in Pretoria.

== Expansion ==
In the late 1990s to early 2000s, the Vista University and the University of Central Florida Consortium developed a mutually interactive program designed to:

1) Create a technologically based distance education program sensitive to local challenges, including the enhancement of Vista University's Distance Education Campus Student Support Centres.

2) Enhance the capacity of various programs, including the Sociology program and academic staff through appropriate education instruction models, curriculum development, media-based instruction and research agendas.

== Closure ==
The university closed as part of a broader reorganisation of South African universities in the early to mid 2000s. Its facilities and some members of the staff have been merged into other universities, including:

- the Nelson Mandela University,
- the University of the Free State,
- the University of Johannesburg,
- the University of Pretoria,
- the University of South Africa (VUDEC) and
- the Vaal University of Technology.

== Notable staff and alumni ==
- Paul Avis, 1970s professional tennis player and clinical psychologist
- Mark Behr, author
- Alan Clark, CEO of SABMiller
- Kenny Kunene, businessman
- Mcebisi Jonas, former Deputy Finance Minister
- Mimy Matimbe, Commander 4 Artillery Regiment
- Roy Matube, Union Chairperson-Vista nationality
- Ignatius Makgoka, Chief Information Technology Officer and businessman
- Letlhokwa Mpedi, Vice-Chancellor and Principal of the University of Johannesburg
- Buyisiwe Sondezi, first woman in Africa to earn a PhD in Experimental physics
- Bantubonke Tokota, lawyer and judge of the Eastern Cape High Court
