= Buyisiwe Sondezi =

South African physicist

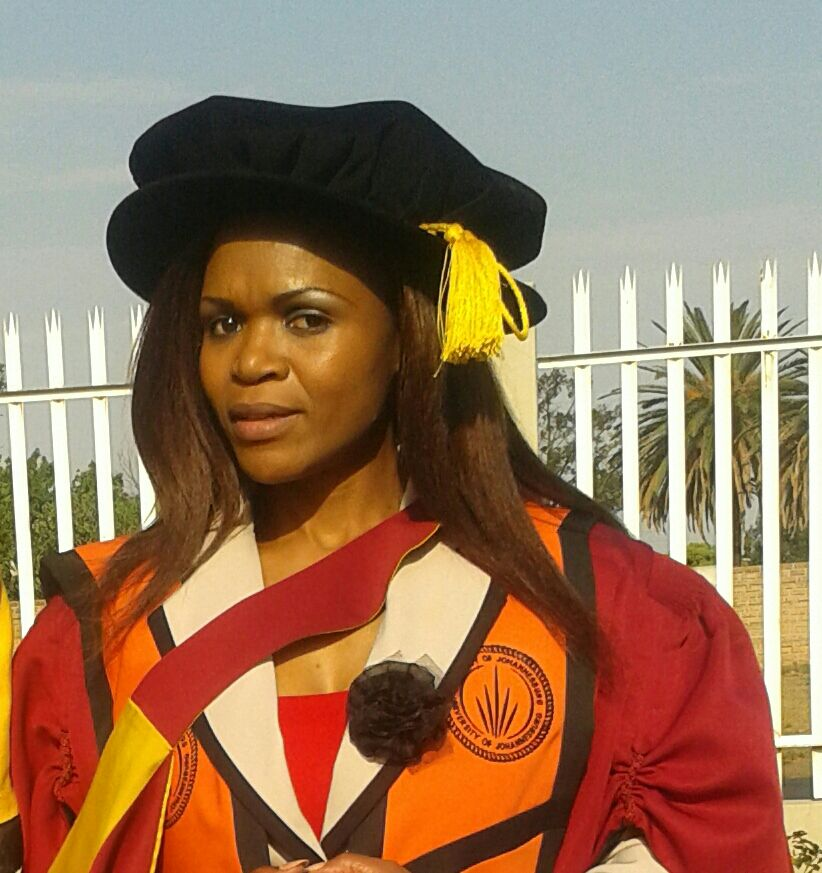
- Born: Benva farm, in Nyanyadu Newcastle, South Africa
- Scientific career
- Fields: Experimental Physics
- Workplaces: University of Johannesburg
- Thesis: The physical properties of ferromagnetic CeTX compounds, where T is Copper and Gold and X is Silicon and Germanium (2014)

Buyisiwe Sondezi is a South African physicist. She was the first woman in Africa to obtain a Doctor of Philosophy (PhD) in experimental physics of highly correlated matter when she graduated at University of Johannesburg on 23 September 2014.

== Academic life ==
Buyisiwe is the first born child and a sister of ten siblings. She grew up in Newcastle and learnt science at a rural school. The school had no laboratory. "I had to picture how things are, because the school had no lab. I was just told if you mix 'one' and 'two' you get a 'three'. We relied on what the textbook said," says Dr Sondezi. She saw laboratory equipment for the first time while studying towards her degree at Vista University in Soweto, which is now part of the University of Johannesburg. Buyisiwe graduated with a Bachelor of Science (BSc) in Physics, Chemistry and Statistics.

Buyisiwe worked briefly as a teacher at Sandringham High School, Johannesburg in 2003. In 2005, she lectured Fundamental Physics class at Rand Afrikaans University and demonstrated the second year Physics Practicals at the same university.

She holds a Honours and master's degrees in physics, researching properties of solar cells. She started her PhD in the same direction, however, she switched the topic of her doctorate to highly correlated matter in experimental physics in 2007.

South African Nuclear Energy Corporation (NECSA) employed her as a scientist in the Radiation Utilisation Division between 2005 and 2007. In 2007, she started working for University of Johannesburg as a lecturer.

In 2009, she won the Department of Science and Technology's women in Science award and was nominated as one of Cosmopolitan magazine's "Fun and Fearless Women".

In 2012, she was named one of Mail & Guardian's 200 Young South Africans, in the Science and Technology category.

Buyisiwe made news headlines as the first woman in Africa to earn a PhD in her field in October 2014.

The study is based on cerium-based compounds and intermetallic systems which feature within the broad class of strongly correlated electron systems (SCES). The temperature dependence of physical properties in the vicinity of a quantum critical point (QCP) opens up a realm of new and unexplored physics. Research into quantum critical phenomena is not only conducive to a study of new physics in its own right, but is expected to lead to a much broader understanding of the complex yet fundamental behavior of elementary particles in metals and the cooperative phenomena in them that lead to the wide variety of useful applications of intermetallics in everyday life. The problem at the center of this work is the new and unknown temperature- and field-dependencies of physical properties (electronic transport, thermal transport, magnetic and thermodynamic properties) in localized magnetic systems when brought to quantum criticality.

She has written publications in collaboration with various physicists based around the globe.

In her spare time, she tutors Mathematics and Science to pupils.
