= 1976 Wimbledon Championships – Boys' singles =

Boys' singles
- 1976 Wimbledon Championships

Final
- Champion: (Switzerland) Heinz Günthardt
- Runner-up: (West Germany) Peter Elter
- Score: 6–4, 7–5

Events
| Singles | men | women | | boys | girls |
| Doubles | men | women | mixed | boys | girls |
| ← 1975 · | Wimbledon Championships | · 1977 → |

Heinz Günthardt defeated Peter Elter in the final, 6–4, 7–5 to win the boys' singles tennis title at the 1976 Wimbledon Championships.

== Draw ==
=== Key ===
- Q = Qualifier
- WC = Wild card
- LL = Lucky loser
- Alt = Alternate
- SE = Special exempt
- PR = Protected ranking
- ITF = ITF entry
- JE = Junior exempt
- w/o = Walkover
- r = Retired
- d = Defaulted
- SR = Special ranking

=== Finals ===
Quarterfinals
(Ecuador) Ricardo Ycaza | 2 | 8
(Argentina) José Luis Clerc | 6 | 9
(United Kingdom) Andrew Jarrett | 9 | 3 | 8
(Switzerland) Heinz Günthardt | 8 | 6 | 10
(Soviet Union) Sergei Gruzman | 4 | 3
(West Germany) Peter Elter | 6 | 6
(Australia) Charlie Fancutt | 4 | 6 | 2
(Australia) Brad Drewett | 6 | 3 | 6

Semifinals
(Argentina) José Luis Clerc | 6 | 3
(Switzerland) Heinz Günthardt | 8 | 6
(West Germany) Peter Elter | 8 | 7
(Australia) Brad Drewett | 6 | 5

Final
(Switzerland) Heinz Günthardt | 6 | 7
(West Germany) Peter Elter | 4 | 5

=== Top half ===
==== Section 1 ====
First round
(Ecuador) Ricardo Ycaza | 6 | 6
(Kenya) Philip Ilako | 3 | 0
(United Kingdom) AW Paton | 4 | 7
(Uruguay) Hugo Roverano | 6 | 9
(Bermuda) Stephen Alger | 6 | 6
(Republic of Ireland) Tom Shelly | 0 | 2
(Argentina) José Luis Clerc | 6 | 6
(Sri Lanka) Arjun Fernando | 1 | 2

Second round
(Ecuador) R Ycaza | 6 | 6
(Poland) Dariusz Kotulski | 0 | 0
(Sri Lanka) Sivagnanam Suresh | 6 | 6
(Uruguay) H Roverano | 4 | 1
(Australia) Ray Kelly | 9 | 6
(Bermuda) S Alger | 8 | 4
(Argentina) JL Clerc | 6 | 6
(Bulgaria) A Mihov | 0 | 1

Third round
(Ecuador) R Ycaza | 6 | 6
(Sri Lanka) S Suresh | 1 | 1
(Australia) R Kelly | 4 | 1
(Argentina) JL Clerc | 6 | 6

Quarterfinals
(Ecuador) R Ycaza | 2 | 8
(Argentina) JL Clerc | 6 | 9

==== Section 2 ====
First round
(Egypt) Hisham Nasser | 6 | 5 | 2
(Denmark) JB Muller | 2 | 7 | 6
(Japan) Toru Yonezawa | 1 | 2
(India) R Elangovan | 6 | 6
(United Kingdom) Chris Bradnam | 6 | 4 | 4
(Belgium) M Mouillard | 3 | 6 | 6
(Socialist Federal Republic of Yugoslavia) B Virág | 5 | 0
(United States) Jai DiLouie | 7 | 6

Second round
(United Kingdom) Andrew Jarrett | 6 | 6
(Denmark) JB Muller | 1 | 2
(India) R Elangovan | 5 | 6 | 9
(Finland) Raimo Ojala | 7 | 3 | 7
(Switzerland) Heinz Günthardt | 6 | 6
(Belgium) M Mouillard | 1 | 3
(Brazil) Ney Keller | 0 | 2
(United States) J DiLouie | 6 | 6

Third round
(United Kingdom) A Jarrett | 6 | 6
(India) R Elangovan | 1 | 2
(Switzerland) H Günthardt | 6 | 8
(United States) J DiLouie | 3 | 6

Quarterfinals
(United Kingdom) A Jarrett | 9 | 3 | 8
(Switzerland) H Günthardt | 8 | 6 | 10

=== Bottom half ===
==== Section 3 ====
First round
(India) Swamy Krishnan | 7 | 3
(Soviet Union) Sergei Gruzman | 9 | 6
(Mexico) VG Cors | 2 | 3
(South Africa) Paul Avis | 6 | 6
(Netherlands) Bas Vletter | 1 | 4
(United Kingdom) Neil Rayner | 6 | 6
(Norway) Ragnar Felix | 6 | 6
(Iran) Y Saleh | 4 | 2

Second round
(Soviet Union) S Gruzman | 6 | 6
(United Kingdom) Michael Appleton | 2 | 4
(Sweden) Jan Källqvist | 5 | 5
(South Africa) P Avis | 7 | 7
(West Germany) Peter Elter | 6 | 6
(United Kingdom) N Rayner | 1 | 2
(Norway) R Felix | 6 | 2
(Argentina) Fernando Dalla Fontana | 8 | 6

Third round
(Soviet Union) S Gruzman | 6 | 8 | 6
(South Africa) P Avis | 1 | 9 | 4
(West Germany) P Elter | 6 | 6
(Argentina) F Dalla Fontana | 3 | 3

Quarterfinals
(Soviet Union) S Gruzman | 4 | 3
(West Germany) P Elter | 6 | 6

==== Section 4 ====
First round
(Belgium) Bernard Boileau | 0 | 5
(Brazil) Celso Sacomandi | 6 | 7
(Australia) Charlie Fancutt | 6 | 6
(Israel) Shlomo Glickstein | 2 | 2
(Pakistan) Jamil Ahmed | 6 | 6
(New Zealand) Michael Mooney | 2 | 4
(France) Yannick Noah | 3 | 4
(Australia) Brad Drewett | 6 | 6

Second round
(Czechoslovakia) Dušan Kulhaj | 7 | 4
(Brazil) C Sacomandi | 9 | 6
(Australia) C Fancutt | 7 | 6 | 6
(United States) Walter Redondo | 9 | 4 | 4
(Pakistan) J Ahmed | 6 | 6
(Uganda) C Mukasa | 1 | 1
(Portugal) J Silva | 0 | 1
(Australia) B Drewett | 6 | 6

Third round
(Brazil) C Sacomandi | 8 | 1 | 6
(Australia) C Fancutt | 6 | 6 | 8
(Pakistan) J Ahmed | 2 | 4
(Australia) B Drewett | 6 | 6

Quarterfinals
(Australia) C Fancutt | 4 | 6 | 2
(Australia) B Drewett | 6 | 3 | 6
