= Dying for Gold =

2018 South African documentary film

- Directed by: Richard Pakleppa; Catherine Meyburgh
- Based on: Mining in South Africa
- Produced by: Catherine Meyburgh
- Edited by: Catherine Meyburgh
- Music by: Philip Miller
- Production company: Breathe Films
- Release date: 16 October 2018
- Running time: 99 minutes
- Country: South Africa
- Languages: English; Xhosa; Southern Sotho

Dying for Gold is a 2018 South African trilingual documentary film written and directed by duo Richard Pakleppa and Catherine Meyburgh. The film is produced under the production banner Breathe Films and the film was predominantly shot in Lesotho. The plot of the film depicts the untold real story about the mining in South Africa especially portrays the dying of gold miners due to silicosis and tuberculosis in South Africa, Mozambique, Lesotho and Malawi. The film had its theatrical release on 16 October 2018 and received positive reviews from the critics. The film was also screened in Mozambique and Botswana. It was also screened at the Johannesburg Film Festival on 15 November 2018.

== Synopsis ==
For over 120 years, hundreds of thousands of black men from the countries of Southern Africa have left their families to dig for gold and produce the wealth of South Africa. Then over 500,000 families welcome their loved ones back from the mines in a much worse state than they were when they initially started mining for the gold.

== Cast ==
Selected South African mineworkers.
