= Bantubonke Tokota =

South African judge

The Honourable Bantubonke Tokota

Judge of the High Court
- Incumbent
- Assumed office 1 October 2017
- Appointed by: Jacob Zuma
- Division: Eastern Cape

Personal details
- Born: Bantubonke Regent Tokota; 9 September 1952 (age 74) Cofimvaba, Cape Province; Union of South Africa
- Education: University of Fort Hare; Vista University

Bantubonke Regent Tokota (born 9 September 1952) is a South African judge of the High Court of South Africa. He was appointed to the Eastern Cape Division in October 2017 after 20 years as a practising advocate in Pretoria. He was Senior Counsel from 2006 onwards and also served on the Marikana Commission of Inquiry between 2012 and 2014.

Tokota was born in the Eastern Cape. Before joining the bar, he was a magistrate and civil servant in the bantustans of Ciskei and Transkei; he was also briefly the Ciskei's Minister of State Affairs in 1992.

== Early life and education ==
Tokota was born on 9 September 1952 in Cofimvaba in the former Cape Province. After matriculating from Osborn High School, he worked briefly as an administrative clerk in Tsolo in 1974 before enrolling at the University of Fort Hare in 1975. His education was interrupted in 1978, when he served as an acting assistant magistrate in various Eastern Cape courts (Cofimvaba, Tsolo, and Mthatha), but he returned to the University of Fort Hare in 1979, graduating the following year with a BJuris. He later completed an LLB at Vista University in 1995.

== Civil service and magistracy ==
After graduating, Tokoto was appointed permanently as a magistrate in the bantustan of Ciskei, where he worked until 1985. Thereafter he became inspector of magistrates in the Transkei bantustan from 1985 to 1989 before returning to the Ciskei as a magistrate in Mdantsane from 1989 to 1990. Thereafter, Tokoto served a brief period in the Ciskei government of Oupa Gqozo: he was director-general in Gqozo's office from 1991 to 1992 and then served as Gqozo's Minister of State Affairs from April 1992 to July 1992.

After resigning from the cabinet position, he served briefly as a magistrate in East London before taking up work as a lecturer at the government's Justice College in Pretoria from 1993 to 1996. He also served as a part-time lecturer at Vista University in 1995 and at the Northern Transvaal Technikon from 1996 to 1998. He remained active in the magistracy, serving as a member of the Magistrates' Commission between 1998 and 2004.

== Legal practice at the bar ==
In July 1997, Tokoto was admitted to the Pretoria Bar as an advocate of the High Court of South Africa. He practised at the bar for the next 20 years, taking silk in 2006. His private clients included civil servant Linda Mti, whom he represented in a drunk-driving matter; High Court judge Nkola Motata, in another drunk-driving matter; and justices Chris Jafta and Bess Nkabinde, whom, with his friend Selby Mbenenge, he represented in Judicial Service Commission and court hearings after judge John Hlophe was accused of having attempted improperly to influence justices Jafta and Nkabinde.

More prominently, on several occasions, Tokota was instructed by the State Attorney to represent government departments in litigation, including in several matters which were reported or heard in the Constitutional Court of South Africa. Among others, he represented the Minister of Correctional Services in a suit brought by Clive Derby-Lewis; the Premier of Limpopo in Premier: Limpopo Province v Speaker: Limpopo Provincial Legislature, in which the Premier overturned an act of the Limpopo Provincial Legislature; the Mpumalanga Department of Education in a language policy suit brought by Hoërskool Ermelo; and the SABC in a labour dispute with four of its journalists.

In August 2012, President Jacob Zuma announced Tokota's appointment to the Marikana Commission of Inquiry tasked with investigating the Marikana massacre; the three-member panel also included retired judge Ian Farlam, who was chairperson, and Advocate Pingla Hemraj. The commission ran for over two years, but, according to Judges Matter, Tokota "probably spoke about three times during the hearings. Tokota was to the Marikana Commission what Justice Clarence Thomas is to the United States Supreme Court: as silent as a night in the deep Karoo."

In addition, on several occasions between 2004 and 2017, Tokota served as an acting judge. In addition to stints in the Labour Court and Gauteng High Court, he sat in the Eastern Cape High Court, where his matters included a defamation suit against the Daily Sun.

== Eastern Cape High Court: 2017–present ==
In October 2016, Tokota was one of three candidates whom the Judicial Service Commission shortlisted and interviewed for possible appointment to two judicial vacancies in the Eastern Cape Division of the High Court. During the interview, the panel asked Tokota about the Marikana Commission of Inquiry's report and the role of muti in the Marikana massacre, about the role of race and racism in his decision in the Daily Sun defamation case, and about his prior work in bantustan governments. In particular, he was pressed by politician Julius Malema, who questioned his participation in the institutions of apartheid. Tokota responded that, "Apartheid or no apartheid‚ the law is the law... What do you expect me to do as a magistrate, go on strike?" He also outlined cases he decided as a magistrate in which he had resisted political pressure from the homeland government. After the interview, the Judicial Service Commission recommended Tokota for appointment, and he joined the High Court bench on 1 October 2017. Prominent matters heard by Tokota included the procurement law matter of Majojobela v MEC for Rural Development and Agrarian Reform, as well as the pre-trial motions in the prosecution of several politicians and public servants (including Sindiswa Gomba and Zukiswa Ncitha) who were accused of misappropriating funds set aside for the memorial services of former president Nelson Mandela. He also served as an acting judge in the Labour Appeal Court for two terms in 2022 and in the Supreme Court of Appeal for one term in late 2023. In addition, he was acting Deputy Judge President of the Eastern Cape Division from November 2022 to September 2023.

== Personal life ==
Tokota has five children.
