= Gallery of the Five Continents =

Art gallery at the Louvre, Paris

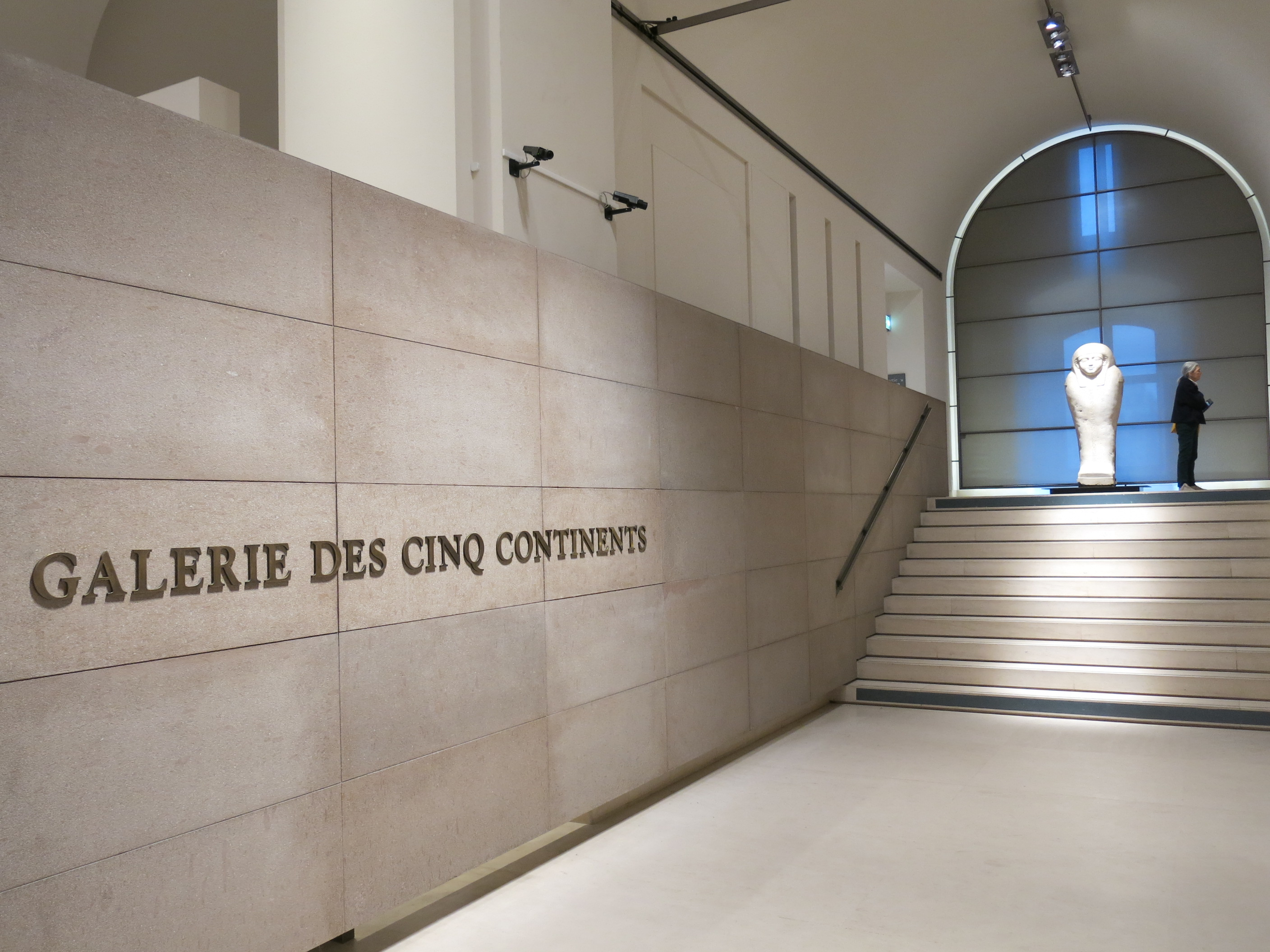
Entrance to the Galerie des Cinq Continents

The Gallery of the Five Continents (French: Galerie des cinq continents) is a permanent exhibition space at the Louvre museum in Paris, France. It has been dedicated to displaying works of art and material culture from across the five continents Africa, the Americas, Asia, Europe, and Oceania in a unified museological framework. The gallery opened on 3 December 2025, replacing the former Pavillon des Sessions and representing a newly designed institutional effort to present non-European artistic traditions alongside Western art in a global narrative of world cultures in the world's largest museum.

== History ==
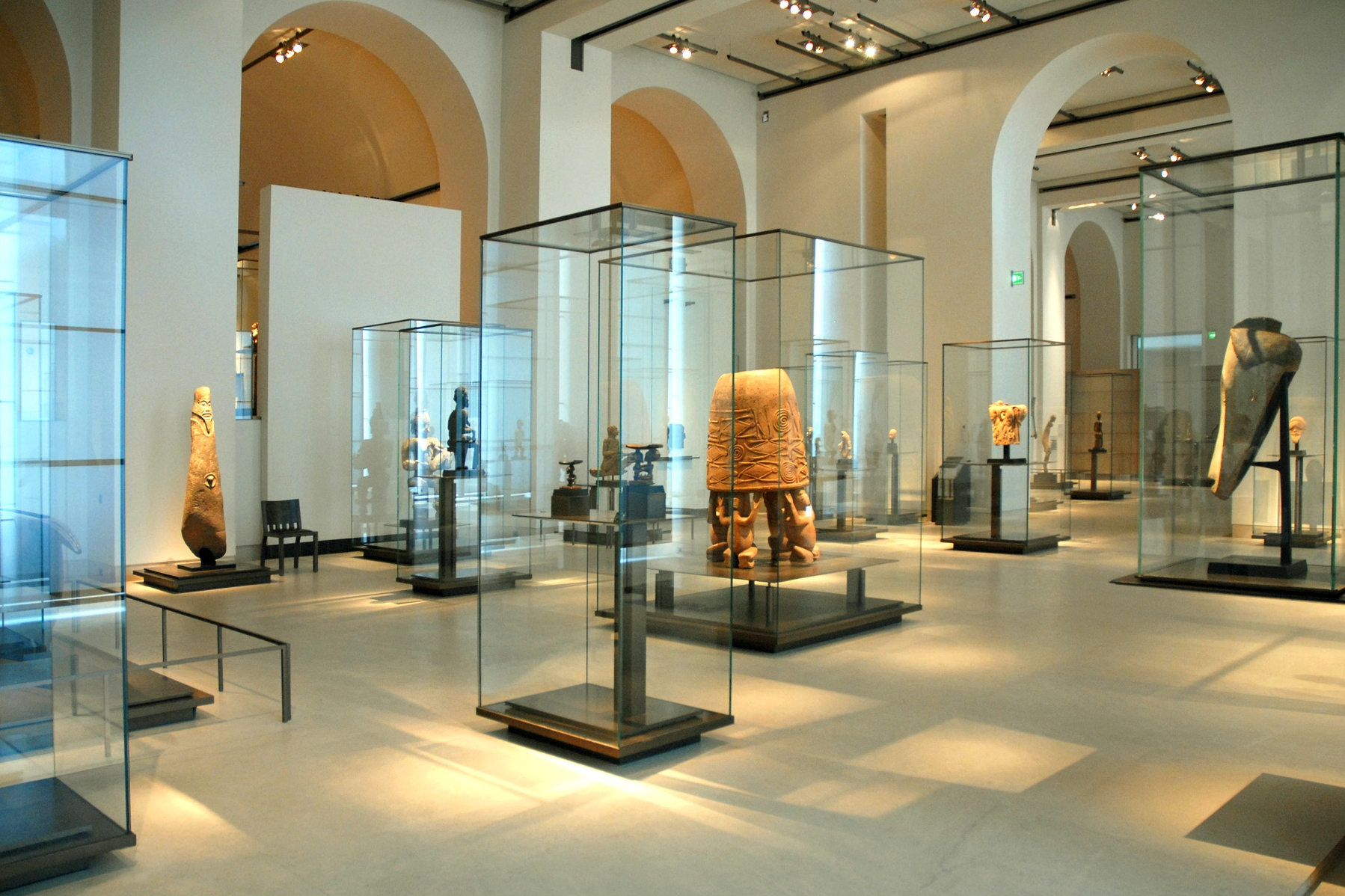
Former exhibition at the Pavillon des Sessions

The space now known as the Gallery of the Five Continents occupies the former Pavillon des Sessions, a gallery within the Denon Wing of the Louvre originally constructed under the Second French Empire to host sessions of the French legislative assembly. The pavilion was repurposed in 2000 to exhibit works from Africa, Asia, Oceania and the Americas drawn principally from the Musée du quai Branly–Jacques Chirac, reflecting a growing awareness in museum practice of the importance of presenting non-Western arts on an equal level with traditional Western narratives. In late 2025, after renovations and a reimagined museography, the pavilion was inaugurated as the Gallery of the Five Continents. This transformation was funded in part through private sponsorship for enhancements to the entrance and visitor facilities.

== Collection and display ==
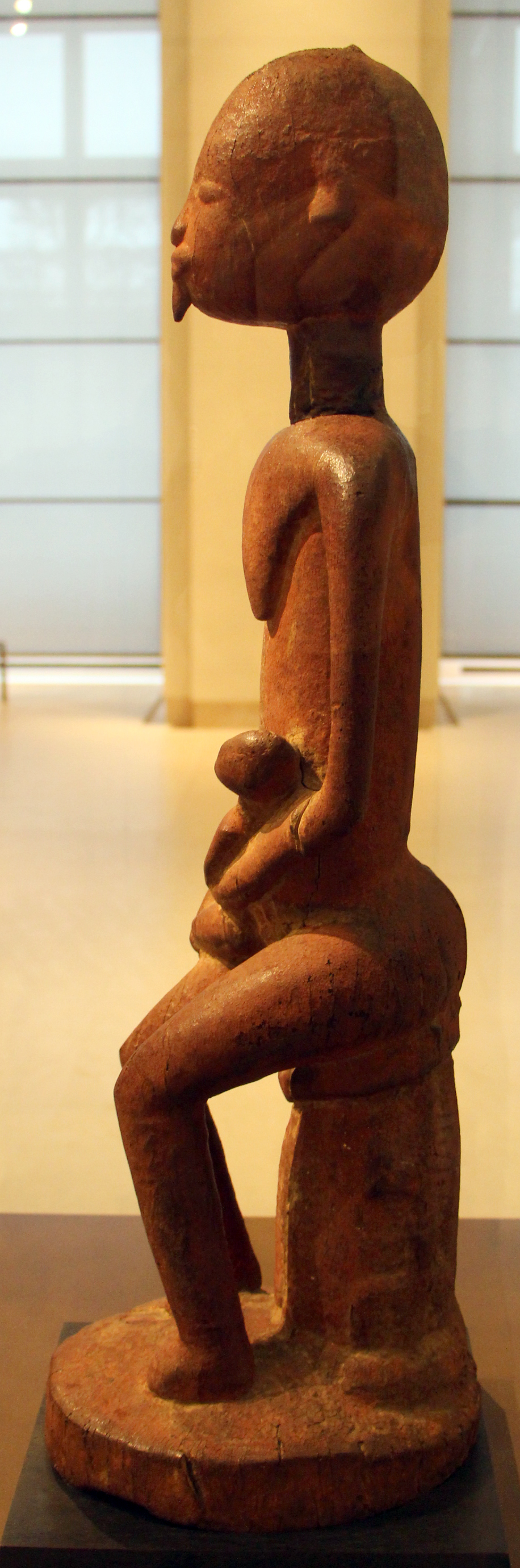
African sculpture of a woman with child, 14th century, from the history of modern day Mali

The gallery presents a selection of 130 major works from the Louvre and other French public collections, with 77 works from the collection of the Musée du quai Branly–Jacques Chirac, and others from the Musée Guimet, the Musée d'Aquitaine, the Bibliothèque nationale de France, as well as loans from international partners such as the government of Nigeria. The selection spans a wide chronological range, from ancient artefacts to historical and ritual objects and is organised to encourage cross-cultural conversation and thematic connections across continents and historical eras.

The exhibition emphasises relations between cultures by juxtaposing objects formerly exhibited in separate historical or regional departments, such as European antiquities or African sculpture, to encourage visitors to consider universal themes such as birth, death, belief systems, authority, and human engagement with the natural world. A description in three languages (French, English and Spanish) introduces each thematic section, while a bilingual label accompanies each work. In-depth fact sheets explaining the history, use and provenance of some 20 pieces are also available.

Further, a nine-part painting series titled Liaisons (Connections) by South African–born artist Marlene Dumas is placed at the entry of the gallery. Commissioned by the Louvre's director Laurence des Cars, Dumas became the first contemporary female artist to be included in the permanent collection of the Louvre.

== Museological approach ==
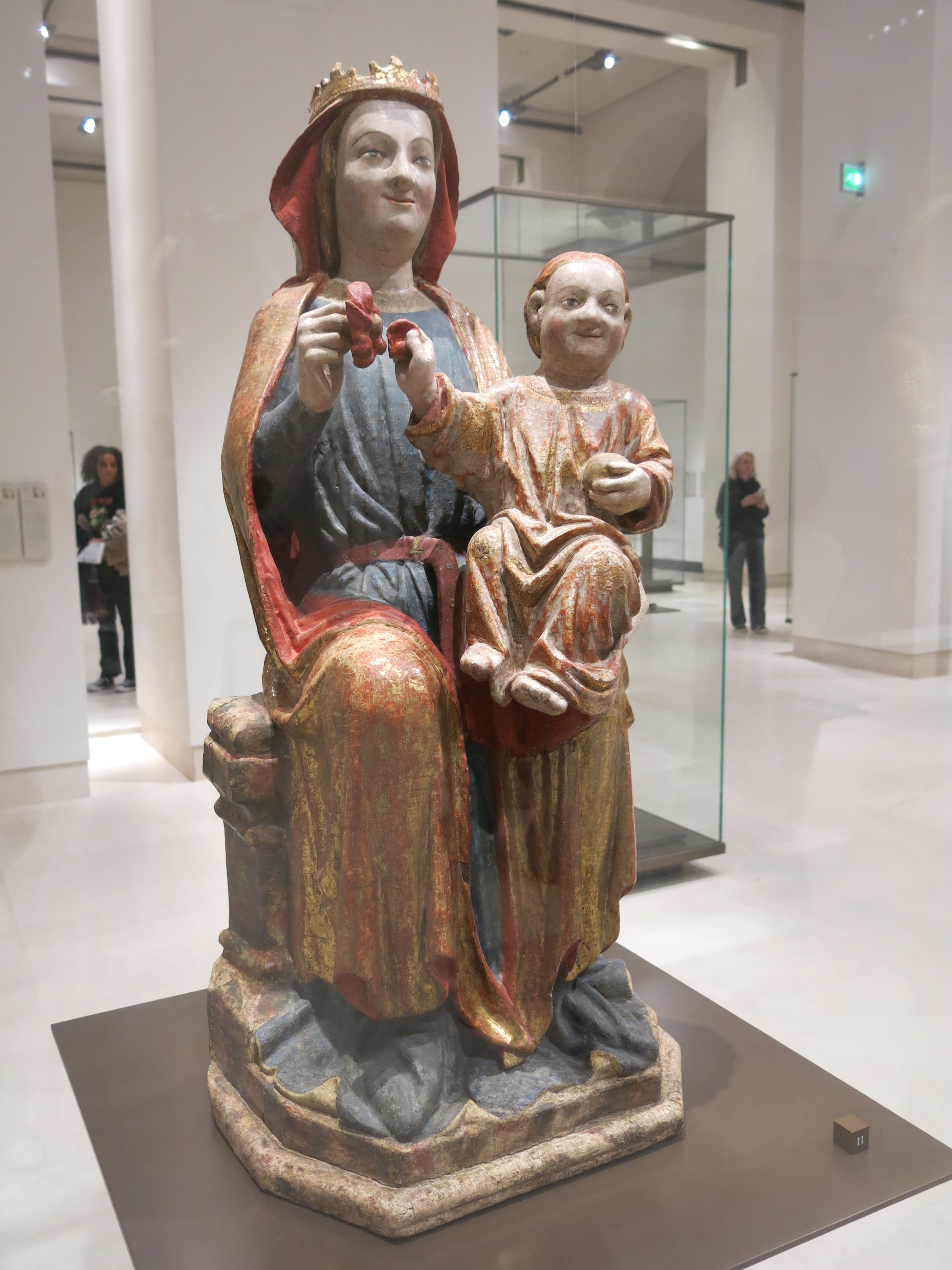
European sculpture of The Virgin with Child, around 1300 CE, Aragon, Spain

The gallery's new layout emphasizes dialogue between civilizations and aims to place different cultures in relation to one another, reflecting the growing recognition of their diverse heritage. The layout and interpretive material are organised to support comparative encounters between Western and non-Western artworks, with multilingual explanatory texts and labels to guide the visitor's interpretation. Thus, an African wooden sculpture of a woman with child is exhibited next to a European religious sculpture of The Virgin with Child as an example of maternity, protection and lineage in a shared human experience.

This approach reflects broader shifts in museology toward decentring Eurocentric narratives and giving due importance to the value and sophistication of global artistic expression. The interior spaces, characterised by broad, light-filled rooms designed by architect Jean-Michel Wilmotte, provide a setting that supports the gallery's importance. The renovation included improvements to visitor amenities and accessibility, with a new entrance via the museum's Porte des Lions, which also offers easier access to nearby collections within the museum.

== Reception ==
Both the Gallery of the Five Continents and the earlier Pavillon des Sessions have been praised as a significant step in presenting non-Western art within the Louvre's collections. In January 2026, the Africa News Agency in South Africa called the new gallery "a small revolution in the museum world, subtle but significant." This review stressed that the works in the gallery now have been included into the museum's principal narrative, showing them alongside the paintings, sculptures, and artefacts that made the world's largest museum internationally renowned. In their comprehensive report on the innovations of the gallery, the French weekly newspaper L'Express wrote the artworks from different cultures are meant to "dialogue with each other."

In a critical way, commentary in academic and museological circles on the artworks from the Museum Quai Branly has highlighted ongoing debates regarding the framing of global art in historically Western institutions. Thus, commentators have argued that such presentations should remain attentive to issues of provenance, colonial histories, legal ownership, demands for restitution, the Eurocentric labelling of artworks as "masterpieces" and power dynamics embedded in museum collections that claim to be "universal".

Earlier controversies about ownership had arisen about Nok and Sokoto sculptures from the history of Nigeria exhibited in the Pavillion des Sessions. In 1998, they had been bought by France on the commercial art market although being listed on ICOM's Red List of African Archaeological Cultural Objects at Risk. After lengthy negotiations, a bilateral agreement between France and Nigeria resolved the issue of who legally owns the sculptures. France formally acknowledged Nigeria's ownership, and the government of Nigeria agreed to lend the works to France for an initial 25-year term, with the possibility of extending the arrangement by mutual consent.

== See also ==
- African art in Western collections
- Museum of Black Civilisations, Senegal
- Report on the restitution of African cultural heritage
