= Alan Clark (businessman) =

South African businessman

- Born: Alan Jon Clark; 22 September 1959 (age 67); South Africa
- Education: University of Port Elizabeth (MA) University of South Africa (DLitt et Phil)
- Spouse: married
- Children: 2

Alan Jon Clark (born 22 September 1959) is a South African businessman. On 22 April 2013, he became the chief executive officer (CEO) of SABMiller, a FTSE 100 multinational brewing and beverage company, and the world's second largest brewer.

On 10 October 2016, SABMiller was acquired by Anheuser-Busch InBev SA/NV so there was no longer a need for a management team for the former SABMiller. In August 2016, Anheuser Busch Inbev had announced that Mauricio Leyva, then the CEO of SAB South Africa, would be the only executive to remain with Anheuser Busch Inbev SA/NV leaving no role for Alan Clark.

== Early life ==
Clark was born on 22 September 1959 in South Africa, son of a tradesman and a clerical mother, he finished school in 1976. From 1977 to 1981, he did his national service, working as a clerk in the South African prison service.

Clark has a master's degree in clinical psychology from the University of Port Elizabeth and a doctorate in literature and philosophy from the University of South Africa.

== Career ==
After completing his doctorate, Clark was a practising clinical psychologist and psychology lecturer at South Africa's Vista University, where he was an associate professor at the Centre for Cognitive Development.

In order to join SABMiller in 1990, Clark was interviewed by Graham Mackay, who he succeeded 23 years later as CEO. Clark remembers finding Mackay and the large panel intimidating, although he was drawn to their "very enquiring" minds. He joined as a training and development manager. He was promoted successively to general manager at the Alrode brewery in Johannesburg, operations director and marketing director for SAB Ltd, before becoming CEO of SABMiller's South African soft drinks operations.

In 2003, Clark was promoted to managing director of their European operations. He was in this role until July 2012, when he became chief operating officer (COO), and then in April 2013, CEO of SABMiller, the world's second largest brewer, succeeding Graham Mackay.

== Personal life ==
Clark is married with two children.
