= Graham Mackay (businessman) =

South African businessman

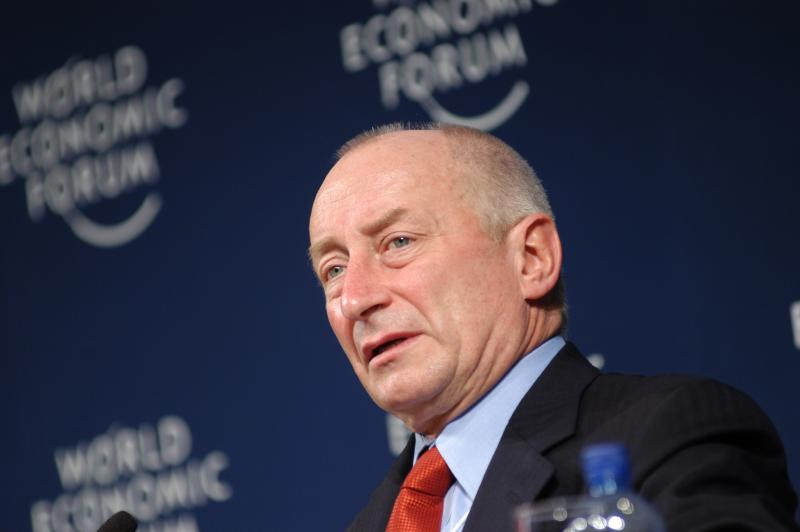
- World Economic Forum on Africa, 2005
- Born: Ernest Arthur Graham Mackay; 26 July 1949; Johannesburg, South Africa
- Died: 18 December 2013 (aged 64); Hampshire, England
- Occupation: Businessman
- Years active: 1970–2013
- Title: Businessman, former Chief Executive and Chairman of SABMiller plc
- Term: 1999–2013
- Successor: Alan Clark
- Children: 6

Ernest Arthur Graham Mackay (26 July 1949 – 18 December 2013) was a South African businessman, former chief executive and chairman of SABMiller plc, a South African multinational brewing and beverage company registered on the London Stock Exchange, and the world's second-largest brewing company measured by revenues. He was succeeded as chief executive of SABMiller by Alan Clark in April 2013.

== Early life ==
Born in Johannesburg in 1949, the son of Gavin and Mary Mackay, he was educated at St Andrew's College, Grahamstown, South Africa, and University of the Witwatersrand, Johannesburg, with BSc (Engineering) and BCom degrees.

== Career ==
By raising its long-standing chief executive Mackay to chairman, SAB Miller was widely considered to have breached City convention and traditional corporate governance practices, which do not allow a chief executive to become chairman without a good explanation. Corporate governance codes also discourage the chairman being a full-time executive, as Mackay will be for a year.

Mackay joined South African Breweries in 1978. He was appointed group managing director in 1997 and chief executive of South African Breweries plc upon its 1999 London Stock Exchange listing. Mackay was the senior independent non-executive director of Reckitt Benckiser Group plc and a director of Philip Morris International Inc.

== Personal life and death ==
Mackay had six sons, three by each of his two wives.

He died on 18 December 2013 at his home in Hampshire, after an illness. He had previously undergone surgery for a brain tumour in April of that same year.
