= Sandringham, South Africa =

Sandringham
- Location within Gauteng Location within South Africa
- Coordinates: 26°08′42.88″S 28°6′38.69″E
- Country: South Africa
- Province: Gauteng
- Municipality: City of Johannesburg
- Main Place: Johannesburg
- Established: 1944

Area
  - Total: 1.13 km^{2} (0.44 sq mi)

Population (2011)
  - Total: 2,557
  - Density: 2,260/km^{2} (5,860/sq mi)

Racial makeup (2011)
  - Black African: 23.5%
  - Coloured: 2.31%
  - Indian/Asian: 1.96%
  - White: 70.79%

First languages (2011)
  - English: 73.87%
  - Afrikaans: 7.68%
  - Zulu: 4.79%
  - Sepedi: 2.89%
  - Other: 10.77%
- Time zone: UTC+2 (SAST)
- Postal code (street): 2192
- PO box: 2131

Sandringham is a suburb of Johannesburg, South Africa. It is a suburb that lies close to Glenhazel and Sydenham. It is located in Region E of the City of Johannesburg Metropolitan Municipality. It is known for its large Jewish population and houses a number of Jewish institutions.

== History ==
Prior to the discovery of gold on the Witwatersrand in 1886, the suburb lay on land on one of the original farms called Rietfontein No.8. It became a suburb on 26 July 1944 and became part of Johannesburg on 10 October 1944, named after Sandringham House in England. Land had been set aside and homes built for returning soldiers managed by the S.A. Legion Soldiers' Housing Organisation.

== Communities ==
There is a long-established Jewish community in Sandringham. In 1955 work began on the new Witwatersrand Jewish Aged Home and Home for the Chronically Ill, described by the Jewish Telegraphic Agency as 'the largest institution of its kind in Africa and one of the most modern in the world.' The building was erected at an estimated cost of 500,000 pounds, ($1;400,000) and be dedicated to the Jewish victims of the Shoah in Europe. In 1997, the mostly Jewish residents of Sandhurst and the adjoining Jewish suburb of Glenhazel funded the establishment of their own police station to combat crime. The suburb is also home to the Chevra kadisha (Johannesburg Jewish Helping Hand and Burial Society). Construction of Yeshiva College began in the suburb in 1960.

== Education ==
- Sandringham High School, Johannesburg
