= Hopkins Badnall =

The Ven. Hopkins Badnall, D.D. ( b Leek, Staffordshire 12 September 1821 - d Maida Vale 27 September 1892) was Archdeacon of The Cape from 1869 until his death.

Badnall was educated at University College, Durham. He was ordained by the Bishop of Durham in 1846. After a curacy in Stockton-On-Tees he went out to South Africa where he was Chaplain to Robert Gray, Bishop of Cape Town). He returned to England in 1851 where he held incumbencies at Goldsborough, and Fishlake.
