= Marlene Dumas =

South African artist (born 1953)

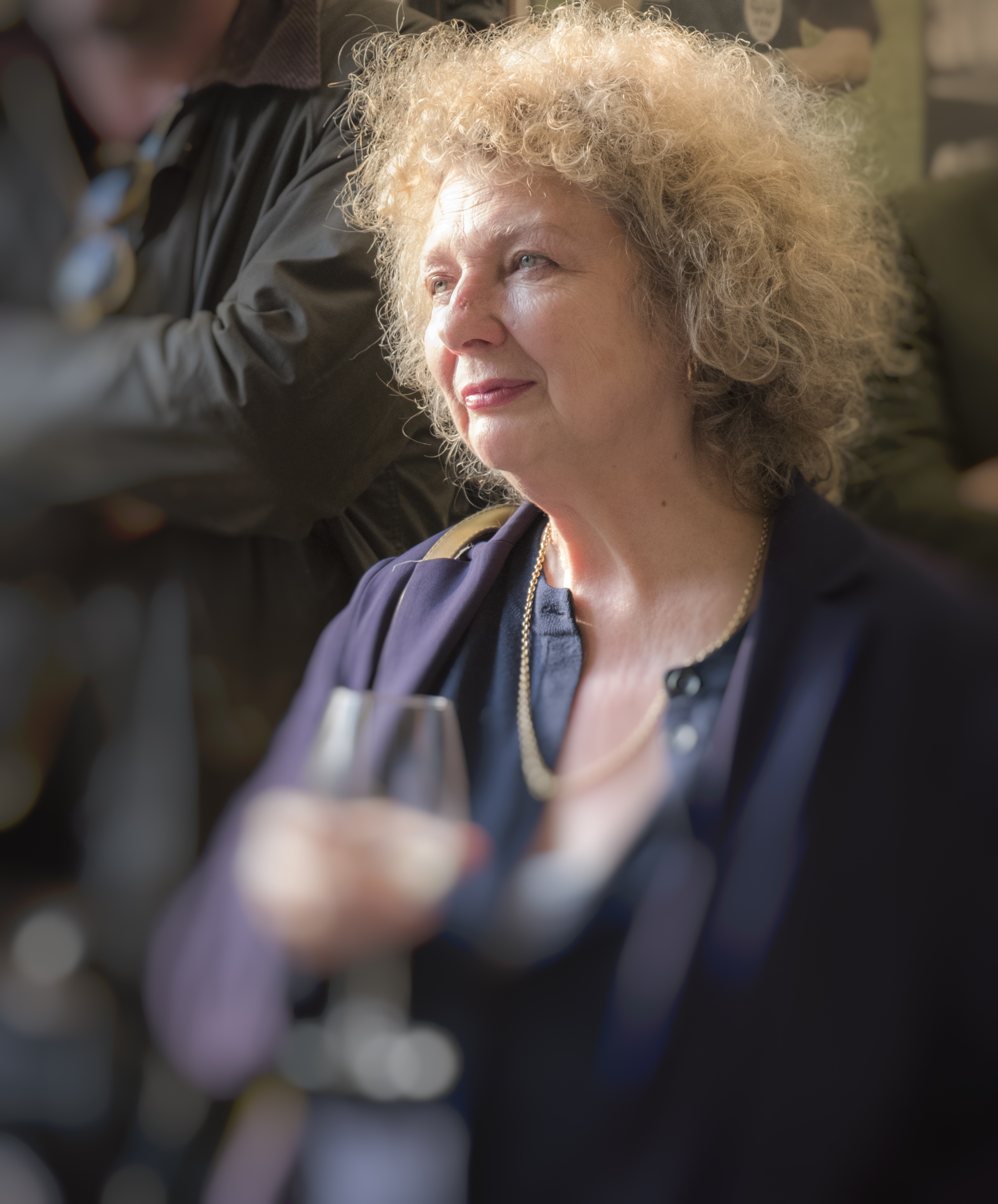
- Dumas in 2018
- Born: 3 August 1953; Cape Town, South Africa
- Education: University of Cape Town; Ateliers '63, Haarlem; University of Amsterdam
- Known for: Painting
- Partner: Jan Andriesse
- Children: 1
- Awards: Rolf Schock Prize in Visual Arts (2011)
- Website: marlenedumas.nl

Marlene Dumas (born 3 August 1953) is a South African artist and painter based in the Netherlands.

Dumas currently lives and works in the Netherlands and is one of the country's most prolific artists.

== Early life and education ==
Dumas was born in 1953 in Cape Town, South Africa, and grew up in Kuils River in the Western Cape, where her father had a vineyard. Dumas witnessed the system of apartheid during her childhood.

Dumas studied art at the University of Cape Town from 1972 to 1975, and then at Ateliers '63 in Haarlem, which is now located in Amsterdam. She studied psychology at the University of Amsterdam in 1979 and 1980. She holds degrees from the University of Cape Town, from Ateliers '63 in Haarlem, and the Institute of Psychology, University of Amsterdam.

== Work ==
Dumas began painting in 1973, exploring her political concerns and reflections on her identity as a white woman of Afrikaans descent in South Africa through her work.

Dumas's paintings include portraits. However, these are less concerned with representing their sitters than conveying an emotional state that the subject could be experiencing. Her work explores issues and themes such as sexuality and race, guilt and innocence, violence and tenderness. She also paints erotic scenes has said that her works are better appreciated as originals since many of her smaller sexual works are very intimate.

The subjects of her work range from newborn babies, friends, models, strippers, and figures from popular culture and politics. Dumas often uses reference material of Polaroid photographs of her friends and lovers, whilst she also references magazines and pornographic material.

Dumas's style is broadly within the tradition of Romanticism. She uses loose brushstrokes to create distortion while simultaneously capturing striking detail in her art. Dumas likes to use a wet-on-wet technique that combines thin layers of paint with thick ones. Her media of choice is oil on canvas and ink on paper.

In 2015-2016, Dumas contributed illustrations for Hafid Bouazza's book of Dutch translations of Venus and Adonis, one of Shakespeare’s earliest works.

Since 2014, Dumas has produced "Great Men", a series of ink-wash portraits, accompanied by inscriptions, of men who have been punished and tortured for being LGBTQ+. Frieze named the series No.14 of "The 25 Best Works of the 21st Century".

Dumas taught at the Academie voor Beeldende Vorming (ABV) in Tilburg, Academie voor Kunst en Industrie (AKI) in Enschede, Rijksakademie van Beeldende Kunsten in Amsterdam, and De Ateliers in Amsterdam (Tutorials and Coaching).

== Exhibitions ==
Dumas's work was included in the 2022 exhibition Women Painting Women at the Modern Art Museum of Fort Worth.

== Collections ==
Dumas's work is in the collections of the Museum of Modern Art and Dordrechts Museum.

== Recognition ==
- Dumas was awarded an honorary degree from the University of Antwerp.
- In December 2025, Marlene Dumas became the first contemporary female artist to be included in the permanent collection of the Musée du Louvre, with her nine-part painting series Liaisons installed in the Gallery of the Five Continents (Denon Wing).

== Art market ==
Dumas has been represented by David Zwirner Gallery since 2008.

The 2004 sale of Dumas's Jule-die Vrou (1985) positioned her as one of three living female artists to trade for over $1 million. The sale of The Schoolboys (1986–87) reached $9 million at Art Basel Miami Beach 2023, replacing the high of $6.3 million for her work The Visitor (1995) in 2008.

In May 2025, Dumas's painting Miss January (1997) — a portrait of a blonde woman nude from the waist down — sold for $13.6 million at a Christie's auction, which set a new record for a living female artist.

== In popular culture ==
Dumas has been featured in many films, including Miss Interpreted (1997), Alice Neel (2007), Kentridge and Dumas in Conversation (2009), The Future is Now! (2011), and Screwed (2017).

Several books showcase illustrations by Dumas, such as Marlene Dumas: Myths and Mortals, Venus and Adonis, David Zwirner: 25 Years, Marlene Dumas: Against the Wall, Marlene Dumas: Sweet Nothings, Marlene Dumas: The Image as Burden, Marlene Dumas: Measuring Your Own Grave, Experiments with Truth: Gandhi and Images of Violence.

== Personal life ==
She is in a relationship with Jan Andriesse and has a daughter.
