= Paul Avis (tennis) =

South African tennis player (1958–2006)

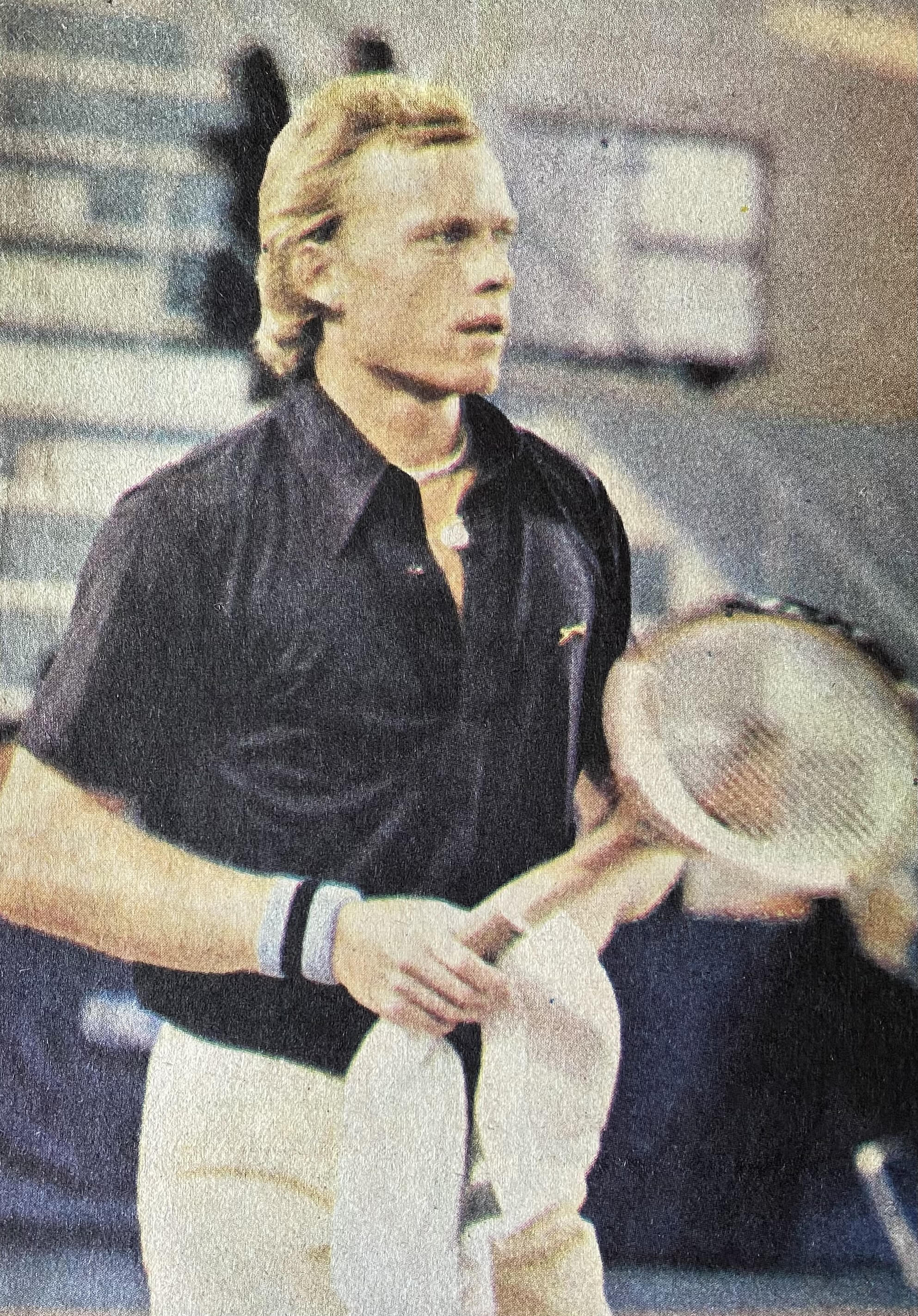
- Paul Avis in 1979
- Full name: Paul John Avis
- Country (sports): South Africa
- Born: 14 April 1958 Springs, Transvaal, Union of South Africa
- Died: December 2006 (aged 48) Durbanville, Western Cape, South Africa

Singles
- Career record: 3–6
- Highest ranking: No. 179 (14 June 1976)

Grand Slam singles results
- Wimbledon: Q1 (1976)

Paul John Avis (14 April 1958 – December 2006) was a South African psychologist and professional tennis player.

Born in Transvaal, Avis was a Junior Springbok and national closed singles champion. He competed on the international tennis tour in the 1970s and 1980s, ranking amongst the world's top 200 and South Africa's top 10. During his career he had a third round appearance at the 1975 South African Open and featured in qualifying for the 1976 Wimbledon Championships.

Avis was known as 'The King of the Portuguese Hall' when he dominated the vibrant tennis tournaments played at this venue in Turffontein during the 1980s and was at his peak considered one of the best players in the country. In 1979 Avis ruled the local tennis scene, winning almost every title including that of the Philips Masters, SA Closed, Philips Challenger Series and the Defence Force. At the beginning of 1979, he swept through the elite Masters field stunning top seeded Johan Kriek in the final. At the end of the year Avis ranked second in the country after winning the Eastern Province Sugar Circuit tournament at the age of 22. He was often referred to as ''The Quiet Man'' of South African Tennis because of his reserved manner. However his game was considered nothing less than explosive. Avis played in one of the first televised Tennis matches in South Africa, the South African open at Ellis park.

Avis retired from tennis at an early age to focus on his studies, and in 1994 completed a doctorate in Sports Psychology. He then became a lecturer in the Psychology Department at the Daveyton Campus of Vista University, but continued his tennis coaching and had a private practice as Clinical Psychologist in Benoni. He was also involved as Sport Psychologist at the ITF Academy at Ellis Park. At the time of his death, from lung cancer in 2006, he had been a professor of Sport Psychology at the University of the Western Cape.
