= Sandringham High School, Johannesburg =

High school in Johannesburg, South Africa

Sandringham High School
- Sandringham, Sandton; South Africa

Information
- Type: High school
- Established: 1967
- Grades: 8–12

Sandringham High School is a South African high school in Sandringham, a north-eastern suburb of Johannesburg. The school opened in 1967 and teaches grades 8 to 12.
