= Liza Essers =

Owner of the Goodman Gallery in South Africa

- Citizenship: South Africa
- Occupations: film producer, curator

Liza Essers is the owner and director of the Goodman Gallery in South Africa, established in 1966.

Prior to acquiring the gallery in 2008, she was an independent art advisor and curator, and the co-executive producer of the South African film, Tsotsi (2005) which won an Academy Award for Best Foreign Language Picture in 2006. The gallery is now seen as an important player in the international contemporary art world following a tradition in the 1960s as being, according to Essers, "The only space where black artists could show their work."
