= Philip Miller (composer) =

South African composer

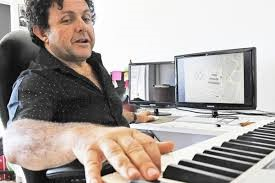
- Philip Miller composing

Background information
- Genres: Film score, electro-acoustic
- Occupation: Composer
- Website: philipmiller.info

Philip Miller is a South African composer and sound artist based in Cape Town. His work is multi-faceted, often developing from collaborative projects in theatre, film, video and sound installations.

Miller is currently an honorary fellow at ARC (The Research Initiative in Archive and Public Culture) at the University of Cape Town.

== Education ==
Philip Miller trained firstly as a lawyer at the University of Cape Town and practised as a copyright lawyer. He studied music composition in South Africa with composers Jeanne Zaidel-Rudolph and Peter Klatzow at the University of Cape Town Music School. He completed his postgraduate studies in Electro-Acoustic music composition for film and television at Bournemouth University. While doing so he studied with UK composer Joseph Horovitz. He then returned to South Africa to begin working full-time in music.

== Collaboration with William Kentridge ==
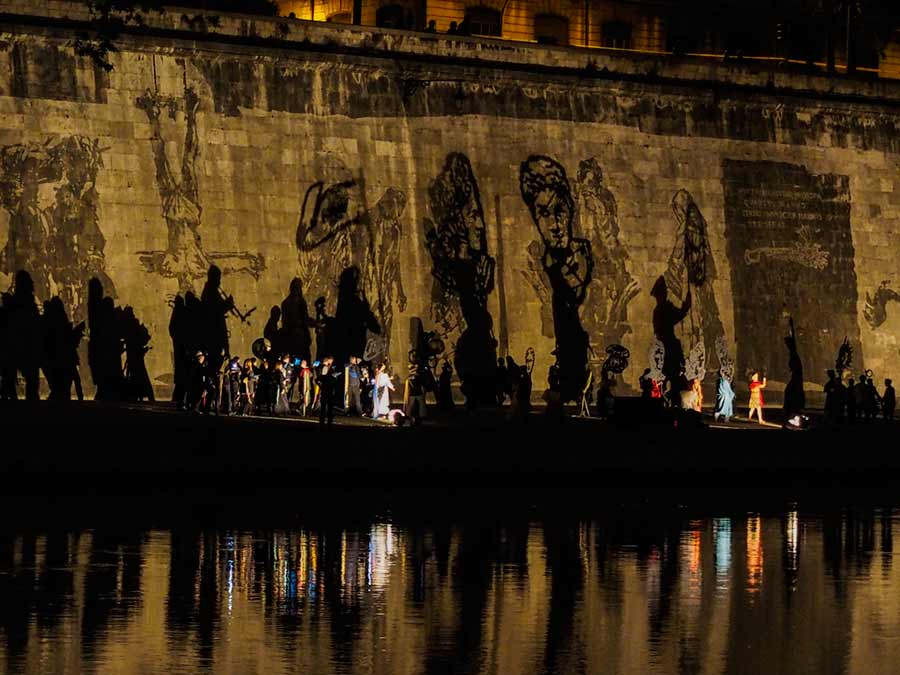
Performance of Triumphs & Laments

One of Miller's most significant collaborators is the internationally acclaimed artist William Kentridge. His music to Kentridge's animated films and multimedia installations has been heard in some of the most prestigious museums, galleries and concert halls in the world, including MoMA, SFMOMA, The Guggenheim Museums (both New York and Berlin), Tate Modern, London, La Fenice Opera House, Carnegie Hall and in Australia at the Perth Festival.

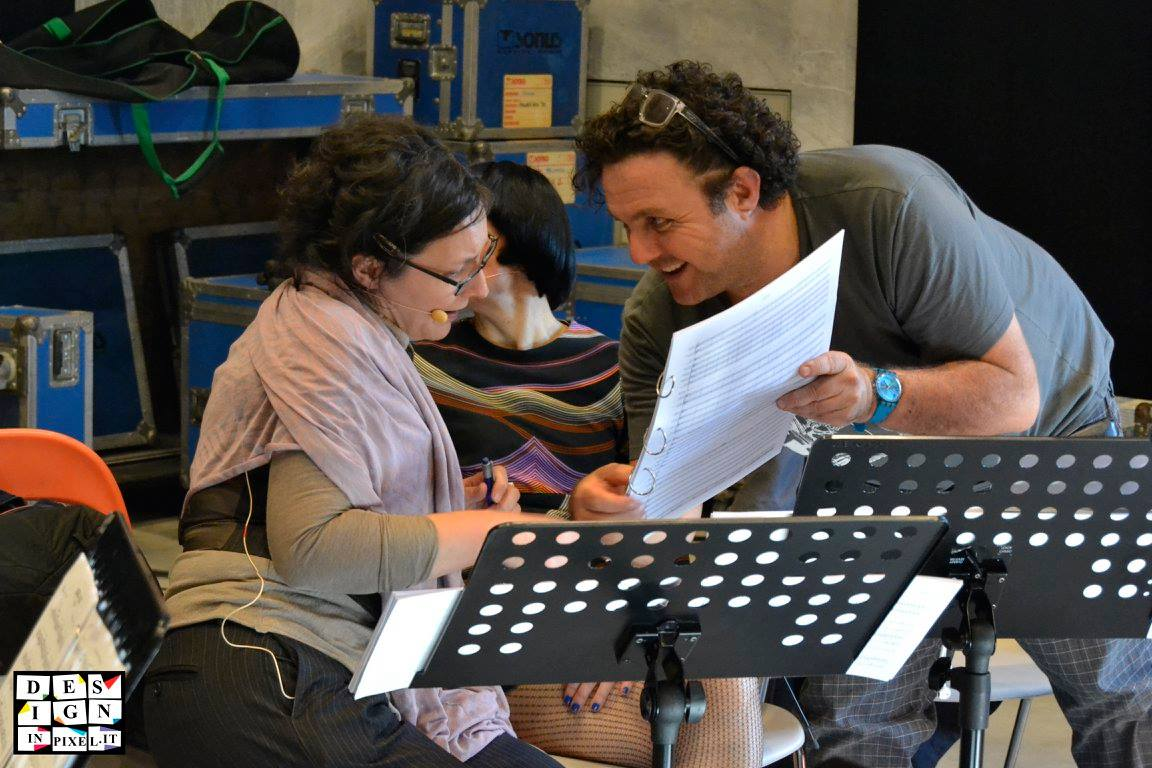
Philip Miller in rehearsal for Triumphs and Laments

This collaboration dates back to 1993 when he wrote the score for Kentridge's film Felix in Exile, part of his celebrated Soho Eckstein series. This evolved into the live concert series 9 Drawings for Projection and Black Box/Chambre Noir touring Australia, the UK, (Germany), Italy, Belgium, France and the US.

The lecture-opera production Refuse the Hour, as well as the multimedia installation on which it is based, The Refusal of Time, were presented at dOCUMENTA (13) in Kassel and at the Metropolitan Museum of Art in New York.

2016 has seen Triumphs & Laments in Rome which featured Miller's music for two processional marching bands with solo singers, choirs, musicians and dramatic live shadow play, all performed against the backdrop of Kentridge's 500-metre frieze along the banks of the Tiber River.

A number of their collaborations are on tour in Europe in 2016, including Paper Music, which makes its German premiere at the Berlin Festspiele in July 2016 and The Refusal of Time at Whitechapel Gallery in London in September. Miller was a contributing composer for the 2016 Darmstadt International Summer Course for New Music.

== Original works ==
Miller's compositional process could be best described as one of re-assembly. These extracted sound and musical shards become refigured into a new sound world using layering and "sound collage" techniques. It often incorporates samples of "found sound" and recorded word texts which serve as counterpoint to the musical context in which they are embedded, intertwining both acoustic and electronic sound elements into his work.

His works reflect on his preoccupation with using sound as a means of exploring memory, states of trauma and the re-examination of historical archive in a sound world of his creation. These techniques and approach have been incorporated in his compositions.

=== Rewind: A Cantata for Voice, Tape and Testimony ===
Conceived and composed, in 2007, this became an award-winning choral work, based on the testimonies of the Truth and Reconciliation Commission in South Africa. The cantata had its international debut in New York at the Celebrate Brooklyn! festival and has been performed at the Royal Festival Hall, London, Williams College 62 Centre for Theatre and Dance, the Market Theatre, Johannesburg, and Baxter Theatre, Cape Town.

=== Dreams of Immortality ===
An exhibition of sculptures by Deborah Bell which showed at the Everard Read Gallery in Johannesburg and Cape Town in 2015, which featured music and sound by Philip Miller: the chord of a single-stringed instrument, the call of a ram's horn, the sound of a violin or the chanting of a Xhosa sangoma.

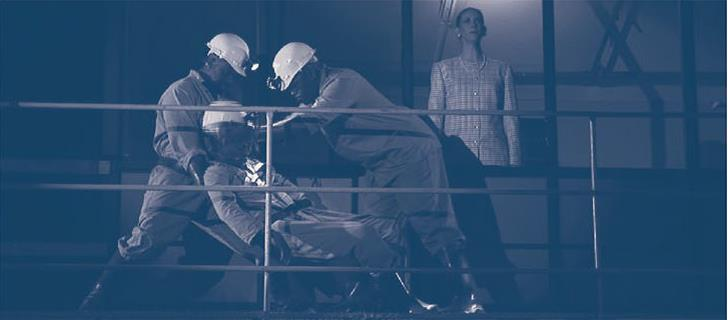
Anatomy of a Mining Accident

=== Anatomy of a Mining Accident ===
A small-chamber opera in which Miller explores the subterranean sound world of miners in South Africa. The focus of this work dealt with the subterranean sound world of local miners – exploring the use of localised mining language or dialect "fanakalo", a pidgin language used in the mines – and how this reflects on the current mining crisis in South Africa and the tragic massacre of 38 miners at Marikana in 2013. Composed and created in 2014 in association with Cape Town Opera and the vocal ensemble it played both in Sweden and in Cape Town.

It was also installed as a sound and video installation at Wits Art Museum (WAM) as a public art project.

=== Extracts from the Underground ===
The Art Museum of the University of the Witwatersrand (WAM) commissioned Anatomy of a Mining Accident'' to be refigured as a sound and video installation on the walls outside the gallery with video projections by the film-maker Catherine Meyburgh.

=== Looking for Kovno ===
Part of an installation at The Kaunas Biennial (2009) (Lithuania). It used recorded telephone conversations with Holocaust survivors, which were then incorporated into the recordings of a local Lithuanian choir learning to sing an old Yiddish folk song which was popular at the time of the mass executions of Jews.

=== Special Boy ===
Selected for the prestigious Spier Contemporary exhibition in South Africa, this used old tape recordings of his voice as a thirteen-year-old boy practising his speech for the customary coming of age ceremony, the [barmitzvah], juxtaposing these recordings with his adult voice as a gay man reflecting on questions of masculinity, sexuality and religion.

=== Can You Hear That? ===
Reflections on the war in Iraq for tenor, soprano, violin, viola, cello, clarinet, piano, and electric piano played by Ensemble PI premiered in New York City in 2009.

== Music for Film and TV ==
Miller has worked with some of the most innovative filmmakers and visual artists internationally and from South Africa. He has composed music for the soundtracks to many local and international film and television productions. Recent film scores include Steven Silver's The Bang Bang Club, which was nominated for a Genie Award in Canada; Black Butterflies, which was awarded best film score at the South African Film and Television Awards (SAFTA). He was nominated for an Emmy Award for the score of HBO's The Girl directed by Julian Jarrold, Martha and Mary directed by Philip Noyce and BBC's The Borrowers. Another award-winning score is for the multi-award-winning film: Miners Shot-Down, directed by Rehad Desai.

He also composed the music for the first episode of Roots, the series premiering on A+E Studios History channel mid-2016. This historical portrait of American slavery is directed by Phillip Noyce (Salt, Patriot Games, The Bone Collector). The cast includes Forest Whitaker, Anna Paquin, Laurence Fishburne and Jonathan Rhys Meyers.

He won Best Original Music Score Award at the Canadian Screen Awards in March 2016 for The Book of Negroes – a 2015 miniseries adaptation of the 2007 award-winning novel by Canadian writer Lawrence Hill. The miniseries stars Louis Gossett Jr. and Cuba Gooding Jr.

== Awards ==
Nomination	Ceremony	Notable contributors	Achievement	Year
Book of Negroes (six-part series; BET/CBC)	Canadian Screen Awards	Clement Virgo (Dir)	Winner: Best Original Music Score Award	2016
Mary and Martha (HBO; soundtrack)	* Wawela Awards		Winner: Best Soundtrack for Feature Film	2014
The Girl (Wall to Wall Productions(HBO))	Emmy Awards	Julian Jarrold (Dir)	Nominee: Best Soundtrack for Feature TV Film	2013
Black Butterflies (feature film soundtrack)	* Wawela		Winner: Best Soundtrack for Feature Film	2013
Black Butterflies (feature film soundtrack)	* Wawela		Winner: Best Soundtrack: South African Film and Television Awards	2013
The Bang Bang Club	Genie Awards	Steven Silver (Dir)	Nominee: Best Soundtrack for a Feature Film	2011
Guguletu Seven	Avanti	Lindy Wilson (Dir); Commissioned by Nick Fraser (BBC)	Avanti Award in South Africa	2000

* Wawela These awards celebrate South African music creators' accomplishments on the international and local stage over a particular defined period.

== Albums ==
Miller has released several albums of his music which include:

Albums
The Refusal of Time
William Kentridge's 9 Drawings for Projection
Black Box/Chambre Noire
The Thula Project, arrangements of traditional South African lullabies
South African Soundscapes
Shona Malanga

These are available online in digital recordings or as CDs.
