= Georgia Papageorge =

South African installation artist (born 1941)

- Born: 1941 (age 84–85); Simon's Town, Cape Province, South Africa
- Education: University of South Africa; Pretoria Technikon
- Known for: Earth art, installations
- Notable work: "Africa Rifting: Lines of Fire, Namibia/Brazil"

Georgia Papageorge (born 1941) is a South African installation artist active in the field of earth art.

== Life ==
A native of Simon's Town, Cape Province, Papageorge earned her bachelor's degree in fine arts from the University of South Africa in Pretoria in 1979; she earned a higher diploma in graphics from Pretoria Technikon in 1981. She turned to art after the death from cancer of her two-year-old daughter. Much of Papageorge's work explores geological rifts, tying them metaphorically to personal and political upheaval. Her more recent pieces have explored the Gondwana schism. In 2003 she completed her work, "Africa Rifting: Lines of Fire, Namibia/Brazil," which featured flowing red material on the sandy beaches of Africa and Brazil.
