= Selby Mbenenge =

South African judge (born 1961)

The Honourable Selby Mbenenge

Judge President of the Eastern Cape Division of the High Court
- Incumbent
- Assumed office 7 November 2017
- Appointed by: Jacob Zuma
- Deputy: David van Zyl; Zamani Nhlangulela
- Preceded by: Themba Sangoni

Judge of the High Court
- Incumbent
- Assumed office 1 July 2015
- Appointed by: Jacob Zuma
- Division: Eastern Cape

Personal details
- Born: Selby Mfanelo Mbenenge; 18 March 1961 (age 65) Butterworth, Cape Province; Union of South Africa
- Children: 3, including Nontlahla and Sipho
- Education: University of Transkei

Selby Mfanelo Mbenenge (born 18 March 1961) is the Judge President of the Eastern Cape Division of the High Court of South Africa. He joined the bench as a puisne judge in July 2015 and was elevated to the judge presidency in November 2017. He was formerly an advocate and silk in East London and Mthatha.

== Early life and education ==
Mbenenge was born on 18 March 1961 in Butterworth in the Transkei region of the former Cape Province. His family belongs to the Xhosa Jola clan and both of his parents were teachers, though his father later went into business. He attended primary school in Butterworth at Bethel Training College and matriculated in 1979 at St John's College in Mthatha.

During his last year of high school, Mbenenge did vacation work for Advocate Neilen Locke, which inspired his interest in law. He received a bursary from the Transkei government to enrol at the University of Transkei, where he completed a BJuris in 1984 and an LLB in 1987.

== Legal career ==
After completing his BJuris in 1984, Mbenenge began his legal career as a regional court prosecutor in Butterworth, though he later transferred to Mthatha in order to continue his LLB studies part-time. When he graduated from his LLB in 1987, he was hired as a state law adviser in the Transkei. He retained that job on-and-off for the next six years, though he took a hiatus to lecture in law at his alma mater from 1988 to 1999 and another to complete his pupillage in Johannesburg from 1990 to 1992.

In 1993, Mbenenge joined the Transkei Bar at Mthatha. For the next 22 years, he practised as an advocate in the Eastern Cape, based primarily in East London; he took silk in 2005. During his career as an advocate, he was an acting judge on several occasions – in the Labour Court and in the Eastern Cape and KwaZulu-Natal Divisions of the High Court – and argued multiple briefs in the Constitutional Court.

In October 2012, Mbenenge rose to national prominence when the National Prosecuting Authority appointed him to chair the disciplinary hearing into complaints against Glynnis Breytenbach, a suspended senior prosecutor. He was the third and final lawyer appointed to the chair the hearing; in May 2013, he cleared Breytenbach of all charges, finding that she had been subject to "victimisation" by the National Prosecuting Authority's leadership. Later in 2013, with Bantubonke Tokota, he represented Constitutional Court justices Chris Jafta and Bess Nkabinde at the Judicial Service Commission proceedings which probed allegations that judge John Hlophe had attempted improperly to influence the justices.

== Eastern Cape High Court: 2015–present ==
In April 2015, the Judicial Service Commission shortlisted and interviewed Mbenenge as one of five candidates for permanent appointment to one of two judicial vacancies in the Eastern Cape High Court. The interview proceeded smoothly, with commissioner Julius Malema joking with Mbenenge that "you look like a judge". Asked why he had not accepted nomination to the bench before then, Mbenenge explained that he had an extended family to support on his salary.

After the interviews, the Judicial Service Commission recommended Mbenenge and Gerald Bloem for the judicial vacancies. In June, President Jacob Zuma confirmed their appointment with effect from 1 July 2015.

=== Judge presidency ===
In September 2015, two months after Mbenenge joined the bench, the Judicial Service Commission shortlisted him as one of three candidates for the position of Deputy Judge President of the Bhisho High Court in the Eastern Cape Division. During his interview the following month, Mbenenge was questioned about his relative lack of judicial experience, particularly by Judge President Themba Sangoni and by commissioner Malema; Malema said that Mbenenge's application for promotion made him "look like you are subject to uncontrollable ambition for power". Chief Justice Mogoeng Mogoeng agreed, saying that when he had seen Mbenenge's application, he had thought, "Hawu, what level of ambition is this?" Mbenenge responded that the promotion "has nothing to do with power; it is about descending to servantship". Nonetheless, after the interviews, the commission recommended another candidate, acting Deputy Judge President David van Zyl, for the position. However, Mbenenge acted as Deputy Judge President at the Mthatha seat for a period in 2017.

In October 2017, he returned to the Judicial Service Commission as a candidate to succeed Sangoni as Judge President of the Eastern Cape Division. During his interview, which lasted almost three hours, Mbenenge outlined a vision for a "user-friendly motion-court system" that would improve access to justice. He advertised himself as a "visionary" and "extrovert" and pointed to his "remarkable" contribution to jurisprudence, including nine reported judgements.

The Judicial Service Commission recommended him for appointment, and President Zuma appointed him as Judge President with effect from 7 November 2017. During his tenure in the judge presidency, Mbenenge oversaw the renaming of the Grahamstown High Court as the Makhanda High Court when the city was renamed.

=== Notable judgements ===
On 12 December 2019 in the Makhanda High Court, Mbenenge handed down judgement in Centre for Child Law v Minister of Basic Education, sometimes called the "Phakamisa judgement" after Phakamisa High School in Gqeberha. In the judgement, Mbenenge overturned a directive of the Eastern Cape Department of Education which had the effect of barring undocumented children (both immigrants and South Africans without identity documents) from public schools in the province. He found that the policy constituted an unjustifiable and unconstitutional limitation on the right to basic education, the paramountcy of the best interests of the child, and the rights to equality and human dignity, which he said applied equally to undocumented children. In 2022, the Legal Resources Centre published a children's comic book, Where is Sanele?, to raise awareness about the Phakamisa judgement.

On 1 September 2022, Mbenenge handed down judgement in Sustaining the Wild Coast v Minister of Mineral Resources and Energy, which blocked Shell from conducting seismic blasting off the Wild Coast of the Eastern Cape. He found that Shell's exploration right, granted by the national government in 2014, was awarded unlawfully and without sufficient public consultation.

=== Sexual harassment complaint ===
In December 2022, a misconduct complaint was filed against Mbenenge at the Judicial Conduct Committee of the Judicial Service Commission. He was accused of sexual harassment by Andiswa Mengo, a female clerk in the Makhanda High Court. The Judicial Conduct Committee (comprising appellate judges Dumisani Zondi, Tati Makgoka, and Nolwazi Mabindla-Boqwana) held a one-day hearing into the complaint in July 2023; Mbenenge was represented by Wim Trengove and two other silks. In September, the committee found that there was a prima facie case of gross misconduct against Mbenenge and recommended that a judicial conduct tribunal should be appointed to investigate the substance of Mengo's complaint.

The Judicial Service Commission accepted the recommendation and announced in December 2023 that a conduct tribunal would be constituted. In the meantime, Mbenenge sought special leave from his judicial duties from December 2023 to March 2024.

== Personal life ==
Mbenenge is married and has three children, two daughters and a son. Two of his children are attorneys of the High Court: he and family friend Bantubonke Tokota admitted his daughter, Nontlahla Mbenenge, to the bar in May 2018, and he admitted his son, Sipho Mbenenge, in November 2023.

He is Christian. He is also a singer and has been a member of several choral groups, including the Joybells Quartet, with whom he produced two albums, and East London's Summerpride Seventh Day Adventist Church Choir.
