= Doctor of Literature and Philosophy =

The Doctor of Literature and Philosophy, or DLitt et Phil, is a doctoral advanced research degree offered by a number of leading universities in South Africa, such as UJ, the University of Johannesburg; and UNISA, the University of South Africa. The degree is equivalent to a PhD and is generally offered in arts, human science (humanities), and social science subjects.

== Requirements ==
At universities such as the University of Johannesburg and the University of South Africa, the degree of Doctor of Literature and Philosophy is assessed by a thesis examined by a minimum of one internal and two external examiners, with the thesis falling between 60,000 and 90,000 words in length. The work must make an original contribution to academic knowledge. A master's degree in a relevant subject with average marks of a minimum of 65% is required for admission.

The UNISA also offers a Doctor of Literature and Philosophy in Health Studies and in Environmental Science.
