= Eastern Cape High Court =

Eastern Cape Division of the High Court of South Africa
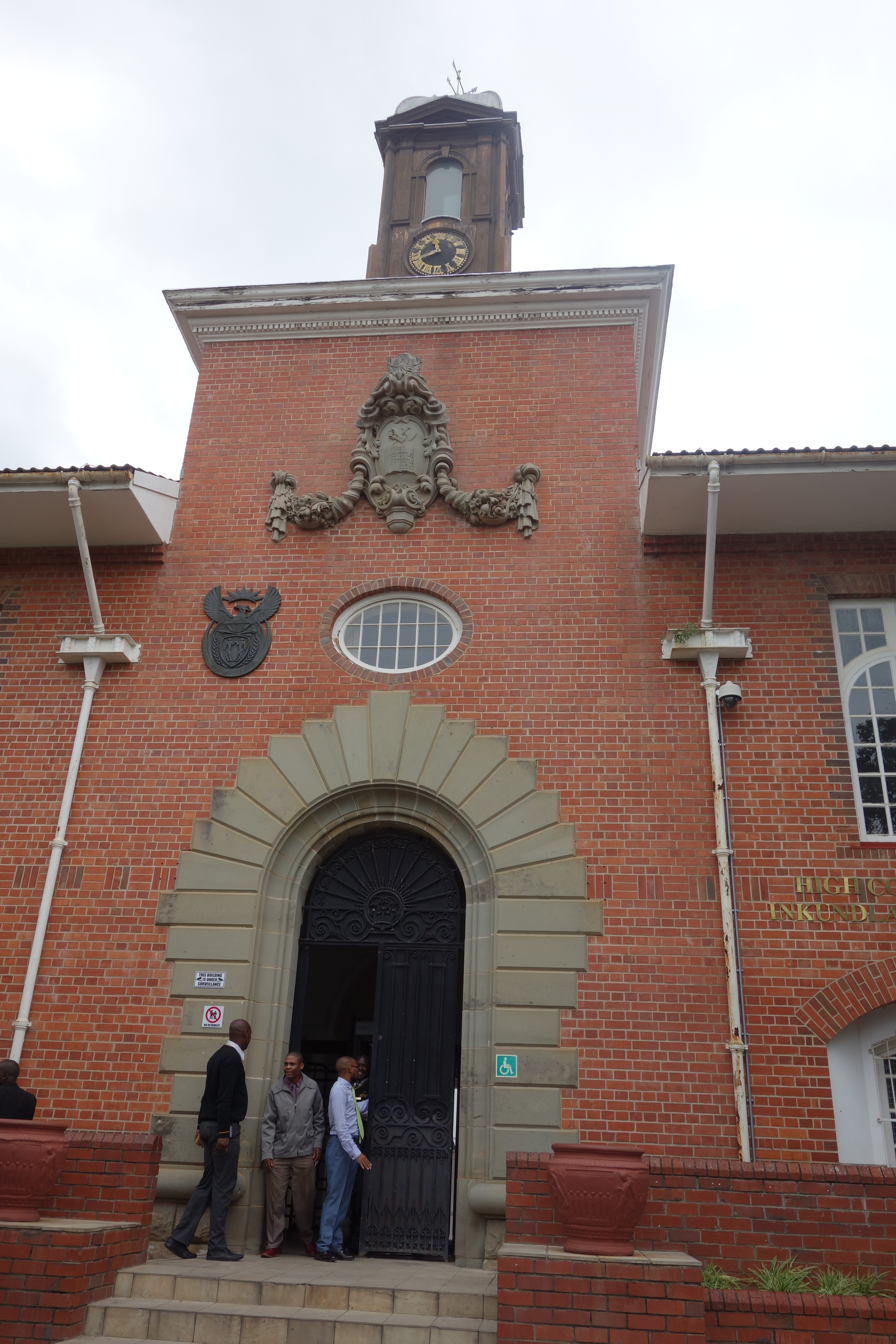
- The court building in Makhanda
- Interactive map of Eastern Cape Division of the High Court of South Africa
- 33.3114°S 26.5251°E
- Established: 1864 (Eastern Districts Court)
- Jurisdiction: Eastern Cape, South Africa
- Location: Makhanda (main seat), Bhisho, Mthatha, Gqeberha, East London (local seats)
- Coordinates: 33.3114°S 26.5251°E
- Composition method: Presidential appointment on the advice of the Judicial Service Commission
- Authorised by: Chp. 8 of the Constitution; Superior Courts Act, 2013
- Appeals to: Supreme Court of Appeal or Constitutional Court
- Number of positions: 31

Judge President
- Currently: Selby Mbenenge

The Eastern Cape High Court (in full the Eastern Cape Division of the High Court of South Africa) is a superior court of law with general jurisdiction over the Eastern Cape province of South Africa. The main seat of the division is at Makhanda, with subordinate local seats at Gqeberha, Bhisho and Mthatha, as well as a circuit court in East London. As of November 2017 the Judge President of the division is Selby Mbenenge. The division has 31 judges' positions: 11 in Makhanda, 8 in Gqeberha, 4 in Bhisho, and 8 in Mthatha.

== History ==
A superior court was first established at Grahamstown in 1864, as the Court of the Eastern Districts of the Cape of Good Hope, to ease access to justice for the residents of what is now the Eastern Cape. The Eastern Districts Court was subordinate to the Supreme Court of the Cape of Good Hope in Cape Town, which had concurrent jurisdiction over the eastern districts. When the Union of South Africa was created in 1910, the Eastern Districts Court became the Eastern Districts Local Division of the Supreme Court of South Africa.

In 1957 the division was removed from the concurrent jurisdiction of the court at Cape Town and renamed as the Eastern Cape Provincial Division. In 1974 the South Eastern Cape Local Division was established in Port Elizabeth to serve that city and the surrounding districts, although the Grahamstown court retained concurrent jurisdiction; that court is now a local seat of the division.

In 1973 the Transkei was removed from the jurisdiction of the Grahamstown court when the Transkeian High Court was established at Mthatha. When the Transkei received nominal independence from South Africa, that court became the Supreme Court of the Transkei. Initially decisions could still be appealed from the court to the Appellate Division of the Supreme Court of South Africa, but in 1979 an Appellate Division was established in the Supreme Court of Transkei. A similar process took place in the Ciskei, which received nominal independence and established its own Supreme Court at Zwelitsha in 1981. In 1984 an Appellate Division was established and the court moved to new buildings in Bhisho.

When the Transkei and Ciskei were reincorporated in South Africa on 27 April 1994, their Supreme Courts remained in existence, but three months later their Appellate Divisions were abolished and their jurisdiction transferred to the South African Appellate Division. When the final Constitution came into force the remaining General Divisions became High Courts of South Africa, known as the Transkei Division and the Ciskei Division. In 2013 under the Superior Courts Act, 2013 they became local seats of the Eastern Cape division, once again subordinate to Grahamstown.

In December 2019 the Eastern Cape Division of the High Court of South Africa ruled against the ban of children without birth certificates from receiving basic education in South Africa. The court ruled that "It is an important socioeconomic right directed, among other things, at promoting and developing a child’s personality, talents and mental and physical abilities to his or her fullest potential" and that "Basic education also provides a foundation for a child’s lifetime learning and work opportunities."

== Seats ==
Map of the areas of jurisdiction of the four seats of the division

Following the 2022 report of a committee on rationalising the jurisdiction of High Court divisions,, the areas of jurisdiction of the seats of the Eastern Cape division were reorganised with effect from 1 July 2026.

| City | Coordinates | Jurisdiction | Former names |
|---|---|---|---|
| Makhanda (main seat) | 33.3114°S 26.5251°E | Exclusive jurisdiction over Makhanda, Alicedale, Somerset East, Cookhouse, Pearston, Graaff-Reinet, Aberdeen, Jansenville, Klipplaat, Steytlerville, Willowmore, Port Alfred, Alexandria, Kenton-on-Sea, Kinkelbos, Paterson, Adelaide, Bedford, Fort Beaufort, Seymour, Balfour, Nxuba (Cradock); Concurrent appeal jurisdiction over the whole Eastern Cape province | Court of the Eastern Districts; Eastern Districts Local Division; Eastern Cape Provincial Division; Eastern Cape High Court, Grahamstown |
| Bhisho | 32.8570°S 27.4317°E | Peddie, Komga, Kei Mouth, Stutterheim, Cathcart, Keiskammahoek, KuGompo (East London), Zwelitsha, Dimbaza, Qonce (King William's Town), Mdantsane, Hofmeyr, Molteno, Ntabethemba, Sterkstroom, Tarkastad, Ezibeleni, Whittlesea, Dordrecht, Sterkspruit, Lady Grey, Maletswai (Aliwal North), Venterstad, Alice, Middledrift | Supreme Court of the Ciskei; Ciskei Division; Eastern Cape High Court, Bhisho |
| Mthatha | 31.5907°S 28.7819°E | KwaBhaca (Mount Frere), eMaXesibeni (Mount Ayliff), Matatiele, Maloti, Bizana, Ntabankulu, Gcuwa (Butterworth), Centane, Dutywa, Xhora (Elliotdale), Willowvale, Cacadu (Lady Frere), Ngcobo, Barkly East, Mount Fletcher, Nqanqarhu (Maclear), Ugie, Mthatha, Bityi, Mqanduli, Lusikisiki, Flagstaff, Libode, Ngqeleni, Qumbu, Tsolo, Port St. Johns, Tsomo, Cofimvaba, Khowa (Elliot), Cala, Indwe | Transkeian High Court; Supreme Court of the Transkei; Transkei Division; Eastern Cape High Court, Mthatha |
| Gqeberha | 33.9647°S 25.6192°E | Gqeberha (Port Elizabeth), Motherwell, New Brighton, Kariega (Uitenhage), KwaNobuhle, Kirkwood, Addo, Humansdorp, Hankey, Patensie, Stormsrivier, Joubertina, Kareedouw | South-Eastern Cape Local Division; Eastern Cape High Court, Port Elizabeth |

== Judges ==
As of August 2023, current judges of the Eastern Cape Division include:

- Selby Mbenenge (Judge President)
- Mandela Makaula
- Bantubonke Tokota
