= The Dogg discography =

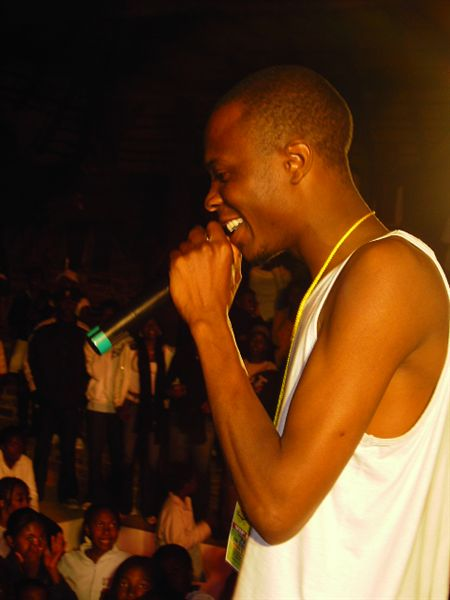
- The Dogg performing in Zoo Park 2006
- Studio albums: 7
- Compilation albums: 2

This is a discography of albums by Namibian musician The Dogg. The Dogg began his professional music career in 2003. He released two solo studio albums in 2004.

== Albums ==
=== Solo ===
Album information
Shimaliw' Osatana
- Released: 27 February 2004
- Label: RC-Ghetto Records
- Charting songs: Perfecto Tromentos, Jesus Otati, Onayena No. 9, Mama
- Award-winning songs: Perfecto Tromentos, Jesus Otati,
Take Out Yo Gun
- Released: 3 December 2004
- Label: Mshasho
- Charting songs: The Dogg Is Back, My Life, Ngenge Ndasi
- Award-winning songs: The Dogg Is Back
Introducing TeeDee
- Released: 27 May 2006
- Label: Mshasho/KOOL Productions
- Charting songs: Baby Don't Go, Kakama
- Award-winning songs: Baby Don't Go, The Dogg Is Here to Stay
You Can't Ignore
- Released: 5 October 2007
- Label: Mshasho/KOOL Productions
- Charting songs: Can U Feel It, Get Sum More, Hands Up, My Girl, He He He
- Award-winning songs: Can U Feel It, Get Sum More, Hands Up, My Girl
This Is My Time
- Released: 3 April 2009
- Label: Mshasho
- Charting songs: Call My Bluff, Forget, My Time, On The Radio
- Award-winning songs: Call My Bluff
The Power of 7 - Elevating Elevators
- Released: 30 April 2010
- Label: Mshasho
- Charting songs: Take You Home Tonight, Jabule, Mover
- Award-winning songs: Jabule
The Deception
- Released: 6 June 2011
- Label: Mshasho
- Chart positions:
- Singles:

=== Collaboration/compilation ===
Album information
Omalaeti O'Swapo
- With: Gazza, Elvo and Pablo
- Released: 27 February 2004
- Label: Omalaeti Music
- Singles: Presidential Call
Lets Celebrate
- Released: 26 December 2010
- Label: Mshasho
- Singles: Lets Celebrate
The Best of The Dogg
- Released: TBA
- Label: Mshasho

== Production discography ==
Below is list of albums on which The Dogg has produced.

| Year | Album | Artist | Role | Label |
|---|---|---|---|---|
| 2004 | Take Out Yo Gun | The Dogg | producer, executive producer | Mshasho |
| 2005 | Dayz Go By | Faizel MC | producer | Ogopa/Butterfly |
| 2005 | Young, Black en Gifted | Sunny Boy | producer, executive producer | Mshasho |
| 2006 | Introducing TeeDee | The Dogg | producer, executive producer | Mshasho |
| 2006 | Skyf | Kavax | producer | Extreme Records |
| 2006 | Elai Lineendunge | Sunny Boy | producer | GreenHouse Entertainment |
| 2006 | Kamasutra Style | Kamasutra | producer | GreenHouse Entertainment |
| 2007 | Etenda Lamafo | Kavax | producer | Etenda |
| 2007 | You Can't Ignore | The Dogg | producer, executive producer | Mshasho |
| 2007 | Phone Call | OmPuff | producer, executive producer | Mshasho |
| 2008 | Bible and My Music, God & Me | Tre Van Die Kasie | producer, executive producer | Mshasho |
| 2008 | Timeless | Karlos Lokos | producer | Show Zone |
| 2008 | U-Turn | Kavax | producer | Etenda |
| 2008 | Oteendela | Tate Buti | producer | Omalaeti Music |
| 2008 | The Sleeping Giant | Sunny Boy | producer | Yaziza Entertainment |
| 2008 | Mdakadaka | Qonja | producer | Lowkey Records |
| 2009 | This Is My Time | The Dogg | producer, executive producer | Mshasho |
| 2010 | The Power of 7 - Elevating Elevators | The Dogg | producer, executive producer | Mshasho |
| 2010 | Lets Celebrate | The Dogg & Qonja | producer, executive producer | Mshasho |
| 2011 | The Deception | The Dogg | producer, executive producer | Mshasho |
| 2011 | From Windhoek With Love | Kanibal | executive producer | Mshasho/Black Market Music |

== Awards ==
Below is a list of awards by The Dogg. The Dogg has participated in professional awards since the inception of his career in 2003. He holds more awards than any other Namibian musician. He has won the Sanlam-NBC Music Awards "Artist of the Year" award 4 times.

| Year | Awards | Category | Results |
|---|---|---|---|
| 2003 | Sanlam-NBC Music Awards | Artist of the Year | won |
| 2003 | Sanlam-NBC Music Awards | Best Kwaito Song (Jesus Otati) | won |
| 2004 | Sanlam-NBC Music Awards | Artist of the Year | won |
| 2004 | Sanlam-NBC Music Awards | Best Kwaito Song (Perfecto Tromentos) | won |
| 2004 | Sanlam-NBC Music Awards | Best Music Video (Perfecto Tromentos) | won |
| 2004 | Sanlam-NBC Music Awards | Best Selling Album – Shimaliw' Osatana | won |
| 2004 | Sanlam-NBC Music Awards | Best Collaboration (Shidolodolo) Gazza featuring The Dogg | won |
| 2005 | Sanlam-NBC Music Awards | Artist of the Year | won |
| 2005 | Sanlam-NBC Music Awards | Best Kwaito Song (The Dogg Is Back) | won |
| 2005 | Sanlam-NBC Music Awards | Best Music Video (The Dogg Is Back) | won |
| 2006 | Sanlam-NBC Music Awards | Artist of the Year | nominated |
| 2006 | Sanlam-NBC Music Awards | Best Hip Hop Song (The Dogg is Here to Stay) | won |
| 2006 | Sanlam-NBC Music Awards | Best Collaboration (Baby Don't Go) featuring Sunny Boy and Nasti | won |
| 2006 | Sanlam-NBC Music Awards | Best Afro-Pop (Baby Don't Go) | won |
| 2006 | Namibian Music Awards (NMA) | Best Single (Baby Don't Go) | won |
| 2006 | Namibian Music Awards (NMA) | Best Collaboration (Baby Don't Go) featuring Sunny Boy and Nasti | won |
| 2007 | Channel-O Spirit of Africa Music Video Awards | Best Newcomer (Baby Don't Go) | won |
| 2007 | Sanlam-NBC Music Awards | Artist of The Year | won |
| 2007 | Sanlam-NBC Music Awards | Song of the Year (Can U Feel It) | won |
| 2007 | Sanlam-NBC Music Awards | Best Single (Can U Feel It) | won |
| 2008 | Namibian Music Awards (NMA) | Best Collaboration (Get Sum More) | won |
| 2008 | Namibian Music Awards (NMA) | Best Single (My Girl) | won |
| 2008 | Namibian Music Awards (NMA) | People's Choice Award | won |
| 2008 | Channel-O Spirit of Africa Music Video Awards | Best Kwaito Video (Can U Feel It) | won |
| 2009 | Nigeria's Hip-Hop World Awards | African Artist of the Year | nominated |
| 2009 | Channel-O Spirit of Africa Music Video Awards | Best Kwaito Video (Hands Up) | nominated |
| 2009 | Sanlam-NBC Music Awards | Best Kwaito Song (Call My Bluff) | won |
| 2009 | Sanlam-NBC Music Awards | Best Single (Call My Bluff) | won |
| 2009 | Sanlam-NBC Music Awards | Best Video (Call My Bluff) | won |
| 2009 | Sanlam-NBC Music Awards | Artist of the Year | nominated |
| 2010 | African Music Awards | Best Southern African Artist | nominated |
| 2011 | Namibian Annual Music Awards (NAMA) | Best Song of the Year (Jabule) | won |
| 2011 | Namibian Annual Music Awards (NAMA) | Best Music Video (Jabule) | nominated |
| 2011 | Namibian Annual Music Awards (NAMA) | Album of the Year – (The Power of 7) | nominated |
| 2011 | Namibian Annual Music Awards (NAMA) | Best Male Artist of the Year | nominated |
