= Becoming Phill =

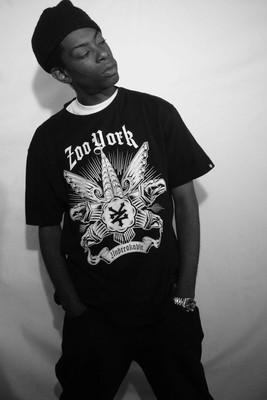
- Self-portrait photograph, 2009

Background information
- Also known as: Becoming Phill, Phill Banks
- Born: Tshuutheni Emvula; October 19, 1981 (age 44); Berlin, Germany
- Genres: Hip hop
- Occupations: Record producer, Entrepreneur
- Instruments: Akai MPC 1000 & iMPC Pro, Turntables, Logic Pro, Reason
- Years active: 1997–present

Tshuutheni Emvula (born October 19, 1981, in Berlin, Germany), sometimes known as Becoming Phill is a Namibian entrepreneur, hip hop record producer, DJ, composer, and video editor from Windhoek, Namibia. He has produced for various Namibian and international artists including Ricky Rick, Gazza, Black Vulcanite, Sunny Boy, TeQuila, Qonja, RUN N.A.M.S., Lize Ehlers, and Zeus.

He has composed music, conducted sound design and supervised soundtrack music placement for the Namibian films 100 Bucks, Love Is..., (won Best Director at Namibian Film Awards 2012), My Beautiful Nightmare, (won Best Independent Film at Luxor Film Festival Egypt 2012), Try, (won Best Film at Namibian Film Awards 2012), Eembwiti, Katutura (2015) and The Unseen (2016).

Becoming Phill has various production styles. He attributes his style to DJ Premier, Pete Rock and J Dilla and also musicians such as Kanye West, Brenda Fassie, Cameo, Osunlade and others.

== Music career ==
Becoming Phill has been producing for over a decade, working with musicians across southern Africa and US. He began when his older sister gave him a copy of the then just released FruityLoops in 1998. He went on to work in a full studio environment becoming an understudy of French guitarist/producer, Christian Polloni, from 2005 until 2009. He is currently working on several other projects. In 2016, he released his first official solo album, Electrum.

== Discography ==
=== Solo albums ===
- 2009: Allsorts Vol. 1
- 2016: Electrum

=== Production credits ===
- 2004: Gazza: produced "KKN" from Zula II Survive
- 2005: Gazza: produced "Nobody" and "My Love" on Stof-Lap Chikapute
- 2005: Hiphocalypse Mixtape various remixes
- 2007: TeQuila: produced, co-produced, arranged and mastered for Sound of My Heart
- 2008: Sunny Boy: produced "Jaiva Mfanyana" on The Sleeping Giant
- 2010: Run N.A.M.S.: produced The Mixtape Vol. 1
- 2011: Lize Ehlers: produced the whole of African Cleavage
- 2014: Pumpkinhead (billed as PH): produced tracks 1, 2 and 3 on This is Not a Tyler Perry Movie (2014)
- 2014: Malkovich: produced tracks 4, 12, and 13 on Great Expectations
- 2016: Riky Rick: produced the single "Spread Love"
- 2016: Black Vulcanite: produced "Playing with Dolls" and "Smoov as a Mutha" from sophomore album, Black Colonists
- 2017: Tha God Fahim featuring Mach-Hommy: produced backing track for "Chicken Milk Bomb" on The Dump Goat
