= Elai Lineendunge =

Studio album by Sunny Boy
- Released: December 2006
- Genre: hip hop, kwaito, hikwa
- Label: GreenHouse Entertainment
- Producer: The Dogg, Morgan (The Syndicate), Elvo, Kboz, Becoming Phill, Godfrey, Big Ben

Sunny Boy chronology
Young, Black en Gifted (2005)	Elai Lineendunge (2006)	The Sleeping Giant (2008)

Elai Lineendunge is the second album by Namibian rapper Sunny Boy, and the first to be released on his own label GreenHouse Entertainment. It was released in December 2006. The album features a much darker sound and much deeper subject matter than, Young, Black en Gifted. It moved away from the mainstream original type of kwaito, used on Young, Black en Gifted and albums done by Gazza and The Dogg, to a hip hop type of kwaito that Sunny describe as hikwa. This style has become influential and has seen Gazza, Qonja, Chipolopolo, Exit & Mushe and many other new Namibian kwaito artist experimenting with it.

== Music ==
The first single released was "Bozza", a fast tempo dance song with a funky bass. The second single was "Summertime". Both songs had videos that premier on NBC. "Who's Gonna Be" is a hardcore Elvo-produced kwaito/hip hop song, a duet with The Dogg which contains subliminal threats aimed at critics who are against Mshasho and GreenHouse. The two also claim supremacy in the music industry by calling themselves the Kwaito and Hikwa Masters. On "Another Levela", Sunny raps about how he separates himself from controversies between Mshasho and G. M. P. and moving to another level. The song is also praised for its lyrical structure. The video for "Summertime" got nominated for "Best Kwaito Video" for the 2008 Channel O MVA's. The album is praised for its good poetry rhymes and stories, and its amazing production.

== Track listing ==
No.	Title	Producer(s)	Length
1.	"Higher" (featuring OmPuff & Chipolopolo)	Elvo	5:01
2.	"Bozza" (featuring Chipolopolo)	Elvo	5:01
3.	"Summertime" (featuring Kamasutra & Luvy)	Elvo	3:53
4.	"Who's Gonna Be" (featuring The Dogg)	Elvo	4:49
5.	"Hakela Omake"	Big Ben, Elvo (co.)	4:11
6.	"Put More Fire"	Elvo, Morgan (The Syndicate) (co.)	4:37
7.	"Another Levela" (featuring Chipolopolo)	Elvo	5:02
8.	"Ashishe Ondesheenda" (featuring Karlos Lokos)	Elvo	4:57
9.	"Ame Neumbo Lange" (featuring TeQuila)	The Dogg, Elvo (co.)	4:16
10.	"Let's Get Busy"	DJ Kboz	4:29
11.	"Chopsa" (featuring Tate Buti)	Becoming Phill, Elvo (co.), Godfrey (co.)	4:43
12.	"Mind Your Business" (performed by Chipolopolo)	Morgan (The Syndicate), Elvo (co.)	4:40

bonus tracks
No.	Title	Producer(s)	Length
13.	"Obuntuwambantu" (featuring The Dogg)	The Dogg, Elvo (co.)	4:13
14.	"Ashishe Ondesheenda (Instrumental)"	Elvo	4:52

• (co.) designates co-producer
