= The Sleeping Giant (album) =

Studio album by Sunny Boy
- Released: December 2008
- Genres: hip hop, kwaito, hikwa
- Label: Yaziza Entertainment
- Producer: A. P. Shipushu

Sunny Boy chronology
Elai Lineendunge (2006)	The Sleeping Giant (2008)

Alternative cover

The Sleeping Giant is the third studio album by Namibian rapper Sunny Boy. It was released on Sunny's new label Yaziza Entertainment in December 2008. The album features production from Namibia's top producers such as Elvo, The Dogg, Kboz, Morgan, and B-Phill. It features appearance from Qonja, Jericho, Hedek, Tre VDK, Nasti, Jossy Joss, TeQuila, Lady May, Luvy, Vanessa, Lokos, and Chipoloplo.

== Reception ==
The album was well received by fans and critics alike, critically acclaimed and considered to be a classic. It reminds listeners to his first hits like "Balance" and "Serious". Every track on the album is driven by smooth social lyrics, story telling poets, love and sympathetic lyrics. Sunny accompany every track with a raw flow. On this album Sunny Boy prove to be the best lyricist among his peers. The album is considered by the media as one of the greatest albums ever produced in Namibia.

Sunny Boy also undertook some production on the album. He co-produced two songs with The Dogg, and two with Elvo. In addition to that, he individually produced two songs . In total he produced on 6 songs out of the 17.

== Other ==
The album features controversies aimed at Gazza and Isaac Nyambali (former Sunny Boy and Mshasho manager), and critics. On the Intro's second verse, Sunny relates himself to some entertainment superstars, local and international like Mandoza, Kabelo, Nas, Jay-Z, Tupac, Notorious B.I.G., LL Cool J, Kanye West, Bow Wow, The Dogg, Jericho, Ras Sheehama, and Qonja. In a quoted line he raps: "am like The Dogg barking and talk a lot of shit/ but I refuse to be like Gazza cos he ain't saying shit/". On "Heat It Up" he calls Nyambali out for stealing his money and calls him a gay. He raps the following: "because of Isaac Nyambali/ shikona who stole my money/ its ok I'm making money/ but don't play me kandihole eemofi/". In the same verse he aims the following to critics: "underRATED, player HATED, manipuLATED, but never FADED".

== Track listing ==
No.	Title	Producer(s)	Length
1.	"Intro" (appearance by Richardo & Qonja)	Morgan (The Syndicate)	4:15
2.	"Heat It Up"	The Dogg, Sunny Boy (co.)	4:27
3.	"Tonight" (featuring TeQuila)	Sunny Boy	4:02
4.	"Hikwa Fiiva"	Elvo, Trace (add.)	4:31
5.	"Yamkwanekamba" (featuring Qonja)	Elvo	4:48
6.	"C U Hataz" (featuring Jericho & Hedek)	Morgan (The Syndicate)	5:18
7.	"Jaiva Mfanyana" (featuring Chipolopolo)	Becoming Phill, Elvo (add.)	4:35
8.	"Kwafelenge" (appearance by Chipolopolo, Tre Van Die Kasie)	Sunny Boy, Godfrey (guitar)	5:01
9.	"Oseike Naave" (featuring Vanessa & Karlos Lokos)	Elvo	4:31
10.	"Diminingepo" (featuring Jossy Joss)	The Dogg, Sunny Boy (co.)	4:19
11.	"Trying" (featuring Nasti)	DJ Kboz	4:45
12.	"Melody" (featuring Luvy)	Morgan (The Syndicate)	4:48
13.	"One time" (featuring Tre Van Die Kasie)	The Dogg, Elvo (co.)	4:46
14.	"Touch Me Teease Me" (featuring Lady May)	DJ Kboz	4:52
15.	"Tje" (featuring Chipolopolo)	DJ Kboz	4:14
16.	"Oyetu"	Sunny Boy, Elvo (co.)	4:50
17.	"Outro" (featuring Hedek)	Sunny Boy, Elvo (co.)	5:05

• (co.) designates co-producer
• (add.) designates additional production
