= Bible and My Music, God & Me =

Studio album by Tre Van Die Kasie
- Released: 2008
- Recorded: 2006–2008
- Genre: Namibian kwaito, hip hop, hikwa
- Label: Mshasho Records
- Producer: The Dogg (exec.), Elvo, Kboz, Tre

Bible and My Music, God & Me is the debut album by Namibian rapper Tre Van Die Kasie. The album features production from The Dogg, Elvo and DJ Kboz. Prior to its release, the album became most anticipated, due to its long-time delay. The media praised the album's composition and structure, but criticise it for its poor marketing and promotion. It was accompanied by no video and lacked a professional radio single. Although When I’m Gone managed to chart, it was the only successful single from the album.

== Title ==
Bible and My Music, God & Me is not a gospel album, though people expected as such. The album combats on topics about life, love, and socio-economic issues. Most of the songs contain a fusion of hip hop and kwaito (hikwa), which earn the album comparison to Sunny Boy's, Young, Black en Gifted.

== Music ==
"When I'm Gone", "Daai Gazie", "Dalla So", and "Eedula Odaya" are the album's biggest hits. The song "Mugus" (meaning; cowards), featuring The Dogg and Sunny Boy is believed to be a diss to Mshasho critics. The second verse of "Mugus" Sunny Boy take shots at Uno Boy, for copying his style. He raps "you copy my style, my dress code, and my naaame'a".

== Track listing ==
#	Title	Producer(s)	Featured guest(s)
1	"Daai Gazie"	The Dogg	
2	"Eshishiwa"	The Dogg	
3	"Chessa"	Elvo	Kavax
4	"Fight Back"	The Dogg	
5	"Motion Melody"	The Dogg	OmPuff & Jewelz
6	"Eedula Odaya"	Elvo	
7	"Mugus"	Elvo	The Dogg & Sunny Boy
8	"Kaz Connection"	Elvo	D Sounds
9	"When I'm Gone"	The Dogg	Jewelz
10	"Dalla So"	Elvo	
11	"Bible and My Music, God & Me"	DJ Kboz	DJ Kboz & Jewelz
12	"My Love"	Elvo & Tre	
13	"Dalla So (Remix)"	DJ Kboz & The Dogg	
14	"Eedula Odaya (Instrumental)"	Elvo	
15	"Chessa (Instrumental)"	Elvo	
16	"Bonus Track"	The Dogg	
