= You Can't Ignore =

Studio album by The Dogg
- Released: 5 October 2007 (Namibia)
- Recorded: 2007
- Genres: Namibian kwaito, African house, hip hop
- Label: Mshasho/KOOL Productions
- Producers: The Dogg, DJ Kboz

The Dogg chronology
| Introducing TeeDee (2006) | You Can't Ignore (2007) | This Is My Time (2009) |

You Can't Ignore is the fourth album by The Dogg that was released on 5 October 2007 by Mshasho and KOOL Productions. The album was to be titled Mshasho: You Can't Ignore and was later changed prior to its release date. The album features the first collaboration between The Dogg and his music mentor Elvo. It also features the first collaboration between The Dogg and Qonja. This album is more mature and very different from his previous albums. It features a dark tone similar to his first release, Shimaliw' Osatana. The entire album is self-produced with DJ Kboz co-producing two songs. As of 2008, the album is the highest and fastest selling kwaito album in Namibia.

== Overview ==
You Can't Ignore is one of Namibia's most highly anticipated kwaito albums of 2007, primarily due to the ongoing rival between The Dogg and Gazza. Gazza created a bigger buzz in 2006, raging from winning the Artist of the Year Award at the Sanlam-NBC Music Awards and touring half of Africa, and in 2007 became the first Namibian artist to release a double album. This was a big step for music in Namibia and many thought Gazza has outshine The Dogg's fame. This album is therefore well known for bringing The Dogg back to his fame. This also proves some hidden lyrical and rhyming skills from The Dogg. During this album The Dogg can be compared to American rapper Nas when he did Stillmatic, an album which many claim resurrected Nas' career after being mocked by Jay-Z. The album has brought The Dogg back to his Kwaito Master status that he sold out on his previous release, Introducing TeeDee.

== Songs ==
The album has produced hits for the clubs and smooth layback tracks for radio play. The first single "Can U Feel It" was produced by DJ Kboz and The Dogg and features Tre Van Die Kasie. The song won two awards (best single and song of the year) at the 2007 Sanlam-NBC Music Awards. It also won the most respected African kwaito award, "best kwaito video" at the 2008 Channel-O Spirit of Africa Music Video Awards. The song was also again nominated for African Artist of the Year by Nigeria's Hip-Hop World Awards The second single "Get Sum More" is a duet with Qonja of Lowkey Records, it is a club hit song containing house and rock elements with brilliant rhyming from the two artist. On "Ondahala Okushiva" (meaning "I wanna know" in Oshiwambo), Dogg and Tre reminisce their days before they were in the music industry and how things have changed for them. "He He He" is an aggressive song in which Dogg questions his critics and outrage Gazza. Other high profile and charting songs on the album are "My Girl", "Good Time", "Another 1", "Komusha Shomtu" and the hip hop sound "Hands Up" which is believed to be a diss to local rapper Jericho.

== Track listing ==
- All tracks produced by The Dogg, except for track 6 and 7 produced by DJ Kboz & The Dogg.

| No. | Title | Length |
|---|---|---|
| 1. | "Another 1" (featuring Stansi) | 3:56 |
| 2. | "Ondahala Okushiva" (featuring Tre Van Die Kasie) | 3:47 |
| 3. | "Mshasho" | 3:13 |
| 4. | "Is It Me" | 4:27 |
| 5. | "Komusha Shomtu" | 3:40 |
| 6. | "Get Sum More" (featuring Qonja) | 3:33 |
| 7. | "Can U Feel It" (featuring Tre Van Die Kasie) | 4:37 |
| 8. | "My girl" (Jewelz) | 3:34 |
| 9. | "Good Time" (featuring Nasti) | 4:15 |
| 10. | "Hands Up" (featuring Fidel O'Del & Elvo) | 4:41 |
| 11. | "He He He" | 4:40 |
| 12. | "Komusha Shomtu (Remix)" | 3:13 |
| 13. | "Another 1 (Instrumental)" | 4:00 |
| 14. | "He He He (Instrumental)" | 4:13 |
