= Omalaeti O'Swapo =

2004 studio album by Omalaeti O'Swapo

Studio album by Omalaeti O'Swapo (Pablo, The Dogg, Gazza and Elvo)
- Released: July 2004
- Genre: Kwaito
- Label: Omalaeti Music/Swapo
- Producer: Elvo

The Dogg chronology
Shimaliw' Osatana (2004)	Omalaeti O'Swapo (2004)	Take Out Yo Gun (2004)

Gazza chronology
Tanauka (2004)	Omalaeti O'Swapo (2004)	Zula II Survive (2004)

Omalaeti O'Swapo was the only album released by the Namibian political kwaito group Omalaeti O'Swapo (meaning: Swapo juniors).

The group included four musicians – Pablo, The Dogg, Gazza and Elvo – who were among the most popular musicians in Namibia at the time of the group's formation. However, the group was actually formed by the SWAPO party. Elvo handled the production duties, and John Walenga handled management and promotion under the supervision of SWAPO.

The album sold well, especially among SWAPO veterans and supporters, but was not critically successful due to its political influence. After the release of the album, each member went back to their respective solo careers, rarely speaking about Omalaeti O'Swapo.

== Political background ==
The album's objective was to promote Namibian's 2004 presidential elections. President Hifikepunye Pohamba was the SWAPO presidential candidate after former President Sam Nujoma stepped down. Omalaeti O'Swapo used the album to encourage young people and the Namibian nation at large to take part in the election.

The album's first track, "Presidential Call", is a remake of Gazza's song "Shidolodolo". It features an encouraging speech from both presidents.

== Establishment of Omalaeti Music ==
After the release and success of the album, its executive John Walenga established a music company, Omalaeti Music. Today, this is one of Namibia's biggest labels and is home to successful selling artists such as Tate But, PDK and DJ Kboz.

== Track listing ==
#	Title	Performer(s	Producer(s)	Note/Sample
1	Presidential Call	President Hifikepunye Pohamba, Gazza, The Dogg, President Sam Nujoma	Elvo	Contains a speech by President Hifikepunye Pohamba and President Sam Nujoma.; Contains a sample from "Shidolodolo" as performed by Gazza.
2	Vota	Pablo, The Dogg, Gazza	Elvo	
3	Omalaeti	Gazza, Pablo, The Dogg	Elvo	
4	Tate Sema	The Dogg, Gazza, Pablo	Elvo	
5	Swapo Otati (Remix)	The Dogg, Pablo	Elvo	Contains a sample from "Jesus Otati" as performed by The Dogg.
6	Jaiva	Pablo, The Dogg, Gazza	Elvo	
7	Sada Di A	Pablo, Gazza	Elvo	
8	Swapo Otati	The Dogg, Pablo,	Elvo	Contains a sample from "Jesus Otati" as performed by The Dogg.
9	Thank You	Pablo, Gazza, The Dogg	Elvo	
10	Oxungi	Omalaeti O'Swapo (Pablo, The Dogg, Gazza, Elvo)	Elvo	Contains a sample from "Shidolodolo" by Gazza.

== See also ==
- SWAPO
