= Music of Namibia =

The music of Namibia includes a number of folk styles, as well as pop, rock, reggae, jazz, house and hip hop.

The Sanlam-NBC Music Awards and the Namibian Music Awards are two separate institutions that give out annual awards at shows on December 2 and May 6 respectively. The Namibia Society of Composers and Authors of Music (NASCAM] has helped promote Namibian music within and outside the country.

The Namibian music industry remains under-developed, with no major record labels or distribution infrastructure. A lack of focus to produce economically viable Namibian music products and the absence of effective marketing and distribution structures are two of the factors inherently hampering the development of the local music industry.

== Folk music ==
Traditional Namibian dances occur at events such as weddings and at traditional festivals such as the Caprivi Arts Festival. Folk music accompanies storytelling or dancing. The Nama people use various strings, flutes and drums while the Bantu use xylophones, gourds and horn trumpets.

- The Herero people's oviritje is popularly known as konsert. Otjiherero is the primary language of Oviritje music. Oviritje was made popular by Kareke Henguva as a pioneer of Modern Oviritje Music when he together with the likes of Kakazona Kavari, Meisie Henguva and Oomzulu Pietersen introduced the keyboard element as prior to the introduction of the keyboard Oviritje Music was performed with vocals only. Prior to Kareke people like Matuarari Kaakunga and Bella Kazongominja have developed the Oviritje genre. Today in recognition of his contribution to the Oviritje music Kareke Henguva has been accorded the title of doctor of modern Oviritje music. Other groups that took over from Henguva and made this music popular are The Wild Dogs from the Okakarara area with their hit song "Kaondeka", Okazera from the Omaheke Region, the first group to include a San-speaking member, Bullet ya Kaoko, based in Opuwo in the Kunene Region, Tuponda, Katja, Millenium, Kareke and the United Kingdom-based Oviritje queen Kakazona ua Kavari.
- Maǀgaisa, a dance music genre commonly known as Damara Punch, is performed by Stanley, ǃAubasen, Dixson and Damara Dikding. Phura Duwe is known to be the king of Ma/gaisa as he came up this genre of music then follows the likes of Raphael and Pele, Pule, Ruby and Riio.

Many female singers are entering the Ma/gaisa world yearly. The genre was derived from Damara traditional music and is mainly sung in Khoekhoegowab.

- Shambo, the traditional dance music of the Oshiwambo-speaking people, derives its name from "Shambo Shakambode" - "music". In the late nineties Yoba Valombola blended existing Oshiwambo music widely popularised by folk guitarist Kwela, Kangwe Keenyala, Boetie Simon, Lexington and Meme Nanghili na Shima. Later Setson and the Mighty Dread Band combined these and other Namibian styles and this was the birth of Shambo shakambode music. Yoba based Shambo on a dominant guitar, a rhythm guitar, percussion and a heavy "talking" bassline. Themes range from love to war and history. Young Namibian musicians contributed sampled tracks backed by a blend of house music and Kwaito. Prominent shambo musicians include Tunakie, Ama Daz Floor, Tate Kwela and D-Naff, also a gospel musician. Kwiku mixes shambo with Kwassa kwassa. The genre was made popular by Tate Buti and his sister Janice with Faizel MC on the song "Kwiku". It is listened to by most Namibians including Basters and Coloureds. In 2005 it was recognized by the Namibia Society of Composers and Authors of Music (NASCAM) as one of Namibia's folk music genres. The annual Sanlam-NBC Music Awards also included it as one of their awarding genres in 2005. Other kwiku artists include trio PDK, Olavi, Killa B, Castro, Faizel MC, Tunakie, and the late YT de Wet.
- Afrikaans music is also popular in Namibia. Afrikaans music primarily influenced by European folk music. In Namibia it is more popular among the white communities. Stefan Ludik is the most successful Afrikaans musician.

== Popular music ==
Popular styles of music in Namibia include hip hop, R&B, Soul, reggae, afro-pop, house and kwaito. Upon Namibia's independence Jackson Kaujeua and Ras Sheehama were the most outstanding Namibian performers. Kaujeua had been performing since the 1970s; he performed a mix of Namibia's traditional genres with afro-pop/gospel sounds. Sheehama performed reggae, in footsteps of reggae late legends Bob Marley and Lucky Dube. Sheehama performed in Jamaica, Cuba, UK, Switzerland and the Czech Republic. Other early Namibian musicians include a Setswana band called People's Choice, that was popular between 1996 and 1998 for their hit single "Don't Look Back (Siwelewele)", a kwaito trio called Matongo Family, Boli Mootseng, X-Plode with members (Jaicee James, Lizell Swarts & Christi Nomath Warner Warner Christi), oshiwambo indigenous rapper Shikololo and R&B turn-producer Big Ben.

=== Reggae/Dancehall/Afrobeats ===
The Namibian reggae platform has produced artist such as Ras Sheehama, Petu, Ngatu, who has been performing since 1994, Mighty Dreeds and EES. In the early eighties a band called We Culture was formed in Katutura and this turned to be Namibia's first reggae band. Another band followed called Roots rebels also based in the Katutura location. The Namibian independence came and most of the Namibian population that was in exile came back to Namibian and bands like Young Dreads later renamed as Mighty Dreads, Ras Sheehama, Los Amadeus, Omidi d Afrique, Shem Yetu, Organised Crime and 40Thieves. Most of these bands faded or became one and a group of young Namibian reggae musicians came up later. Most of the Mighty Dread band members left and formed Formular band or engage into solo careers. Dancehall, Ragga and Dub was gaining popularity and singers like Ngatu (from the Mighty Dread), Doren, Iron Roots, Ras Kasera and Ten-Dreadz came up with a new blend of Ragga Dancehall.

=== Rock n roll ===
Rock n roll is widely celebrated by the white communities of Namibia. Die Vögel is one of Namibia's most outstanding rock n roll bands. The band had success with the German-speaking Namibians during the 1970s. Stefan Ludik was Namibia's first Big Brother Africa participant in the show's first season. G3 a duo of two young Namibians gained success with their hit single "Olupandu" in 2005.

One of the country's most durable rock bands is Bedrock (The Band In The Sand). Formed in 1994 in Oranjemund, the band has released four albums of original material over the years: Recovery (2001), So, Where's The Party? (2003), Simplicity (2008) and Desert Rock (2010). They describe their sound as Desert Rock, an eclectic mix of styles from 1970s rock, blues, pop and folk.

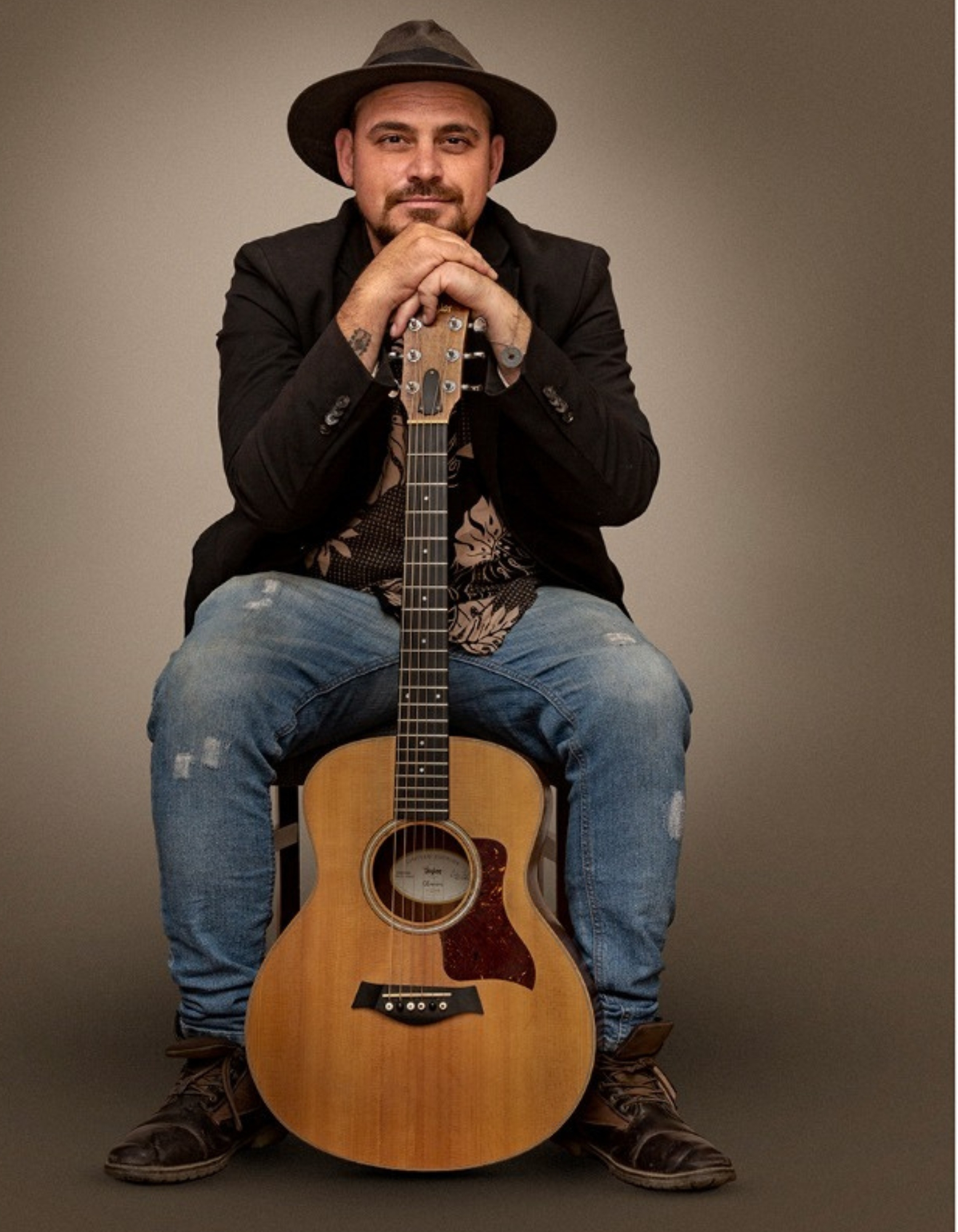
Riaan Smit

Riaan Smit – Namibian singer-songwriter, multi-instrumentalist, and frontman of the band Crimson House Blues. He is known for blending blues, folk, and Afro-gypsy influences in his solo work. Smit is the great-grandson of Costa Rican poet and political figure Rogelio Fernandez Guell . Rogelio Fernández Güell

=== Township Disco / Bubblegum ===
Township Disco/Bubblegum is better known as Bubblegum Mapantshula Afro pop, with a rhythm that brings together artists such as Brenda Fassie and the Big Dudes, Chicco Twala, Dan Nkosi, Ebony, Richard Makhubale of Volcano, Dan Tsahnda of Splash, Yvonne Chaka Chaka, Alec OmKhali of Umoja. Gabkoz also is better known for such type of music in Namibia as well as Specco, Scorpion, Ocean Girls, Mr. Tjiuti, Raindrops, Sonic Witness, The Couples, Right Choice, Manelo, and People Choice band, Erick Mahua, Rirua Murangi and Chicco of Chiccolela Production who have contributed much in these genre.

=== Namibian hip hop ===
Hip hop music and culture have strongly influenced Namibian youth, particularly through American acts such as Tupac Shakur, The Notorious B.I.G., Nas, Jay-Z, Snoop Dogg, Dr. Dre, and Eminem.

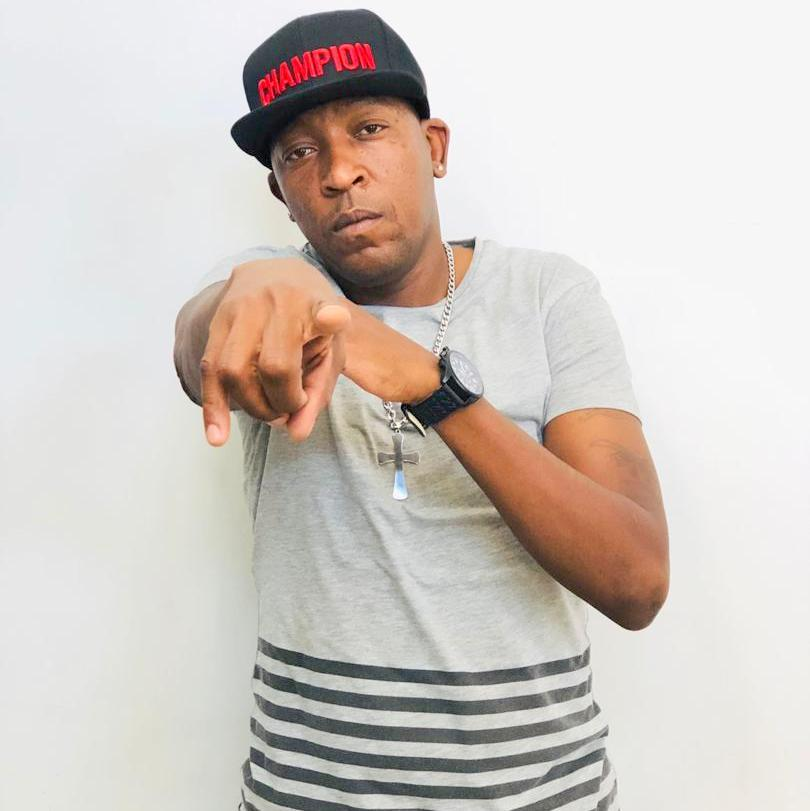
Jericho is a multiple award-winning Namibian rapper. He is regarded as the most successful hip hop artist in the country. He won the coveted Best Male Artist at the Namibian Annual Music Awards (2011) becoming the first Hip Hop artist to do so.

Early Namibian hip hop acts included Dungeon Family, which was composed of the newly recreated supergroup The Kalaharians, the popular girl duo Gal Level, and future music producer Elvo with his group Lash Attraction, who rapped in a style similar to Bone Thugs-N-Harmony.

In the late 1990s, more Namibians began experimenting with hip hop, and names such as Fidel O’Del and Shikololo started gaining popularity. Shikololo was the first Namibian artist to experiment with vernacular rap, performing in Oshiwambo. He influenced later rappers such as M2DY and Tesh to follow the same path.

Namibian hip hop rose to prominence with Black Market Entertainment, a hip hop–based label founded in Windhoek by the late producer and rapper Kanibal. Kanibal assembled a collective of rappers called The Militants, which included his best friend Catty Catt, Dante, and DVD. The Militants dominated the Namibian hip hop scene between 2003 and 2007, both as a group and as solo acts, paving the way for more rappers to join the young industry.

In 2005, Kanibal signed Jericho to Black Market. Jericho would go on to become Namibia’s biggest rapper when he became the first in the country to release a full-length hip hop album. From 2005 onwards, Namibian radio was dominated by local hip hop, with more acts joining the scene, including Dore, Wamboe Suen, DJay, KK, Mark, Contract Killers, and Area 51, among others.

In recent years, Black Vulcanite has been recognized as one of the most outstanding hip hop recording groups in Namibia.

Namibian hip hop continues to compete with Namibian kwaito for popularity.

=== R&B, pop, afro-pop ===
R&B has been popular in Namibia since the 1990s. Namibian R&B singers have influenced the genre with afro-pop. Most of them perform a mixture of pop/afro-pop and R&B. Afro-pop is the African style of wester-pop. The Namibian R&B/pop genre has produced continental celebrated duo Gal Level and solo singers African Boy, Sally Boss Madam, Christi Nomath Warner (who uses her poetry as basis for her lyrics) & Lady May. Te Quila, Jewelz and Sally Boss Madam are one of the most promising R&B/pop singers of Namibia. Male artist such as Rodger and Nasti are also popular they all show influence from Ne-Yo, Mario, and Chris Brown. Jossy Joss and Big Ben are one of the earliest singers of Namibia. Big Ben has been the most consistent with this genre since his first release in 2001.

== Young Musicians Early 2000s ==
RistoMystic (real name Risto Negumbo) is a Namibian singer-songwriter, rapper and producer known for blending Afro-pop, R&B and hip-hop elements to reflect Namibian urban narratives. Based in Windhoek, he has released a number of singles and EPs under his stage name, and built a strong artist-profile both in Namibia and across the region. With themes of personal empowerment, culture and social change, RistoMystic has become one of the emerging voices representing a new generation of Namibian popular music.

=== Kwaito ===
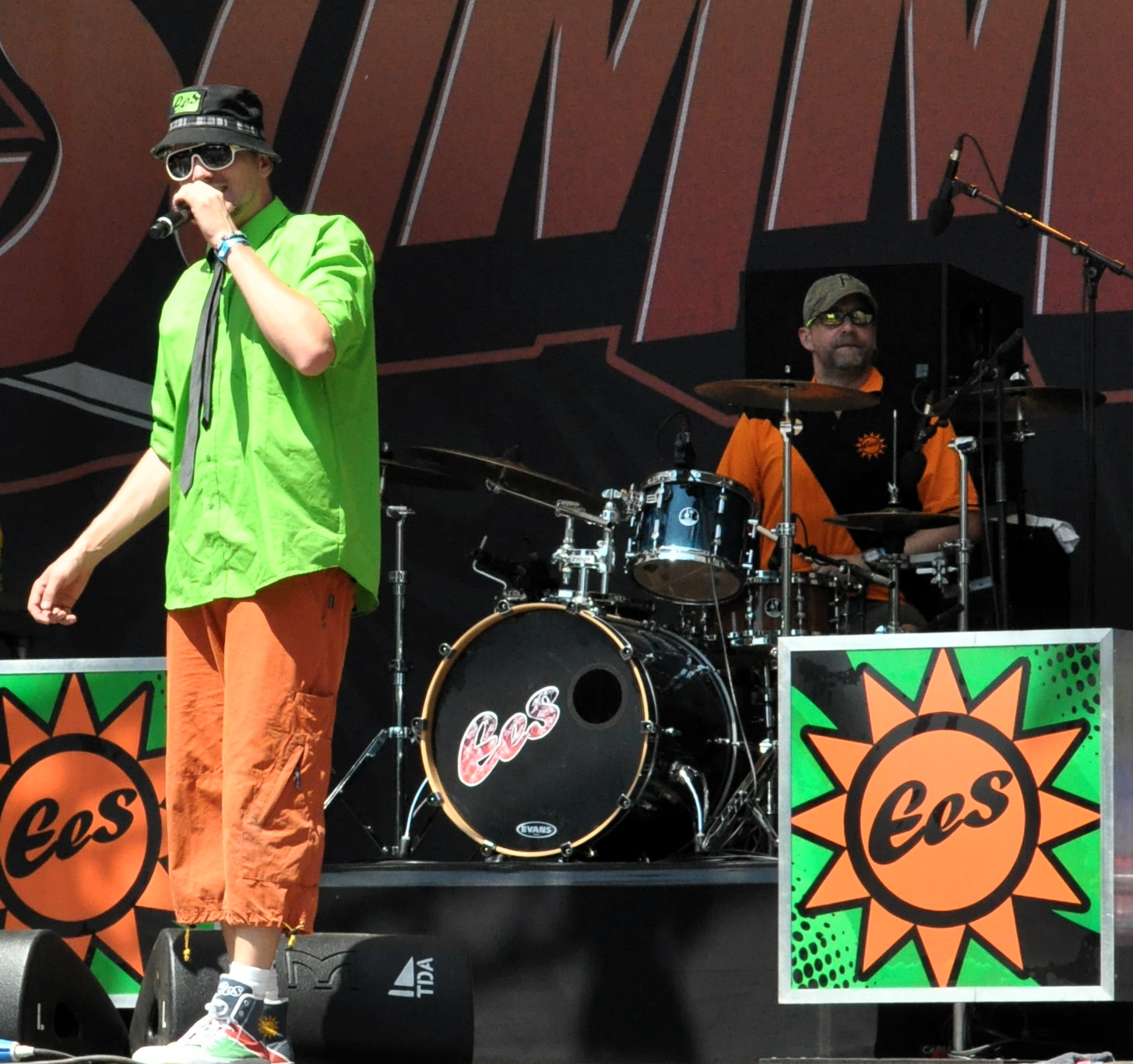
EES performing kwaito

The kwaito genre is the most popular and successful music genre in Namibia. It's believed to be the biggest industry in Namibia's music and the only that is heavily supported by the youth. This is so because of socio-economic issues, as many artists enter the music industry with hopes of strengthening self-employment and making a living out of it. Namibian kwaito has been strengthened and directly influenced by the South African kwaito style. However, over the years Namibia introduced a different type of kwaito, which makes it slightly different from the South African tradition. The difference lies in production; Namibian producers focus their production on party-oriented music.

Namibian kwaito artists include The Dogg, Gazza, Sunny Boy, Qonja, Tre Van Die Kasie, and OmPuff. The Dogg's debut album, Shimaliw' Osatana, was the first kwaito album released in Namibia by a Namibian artist.

=== House ===
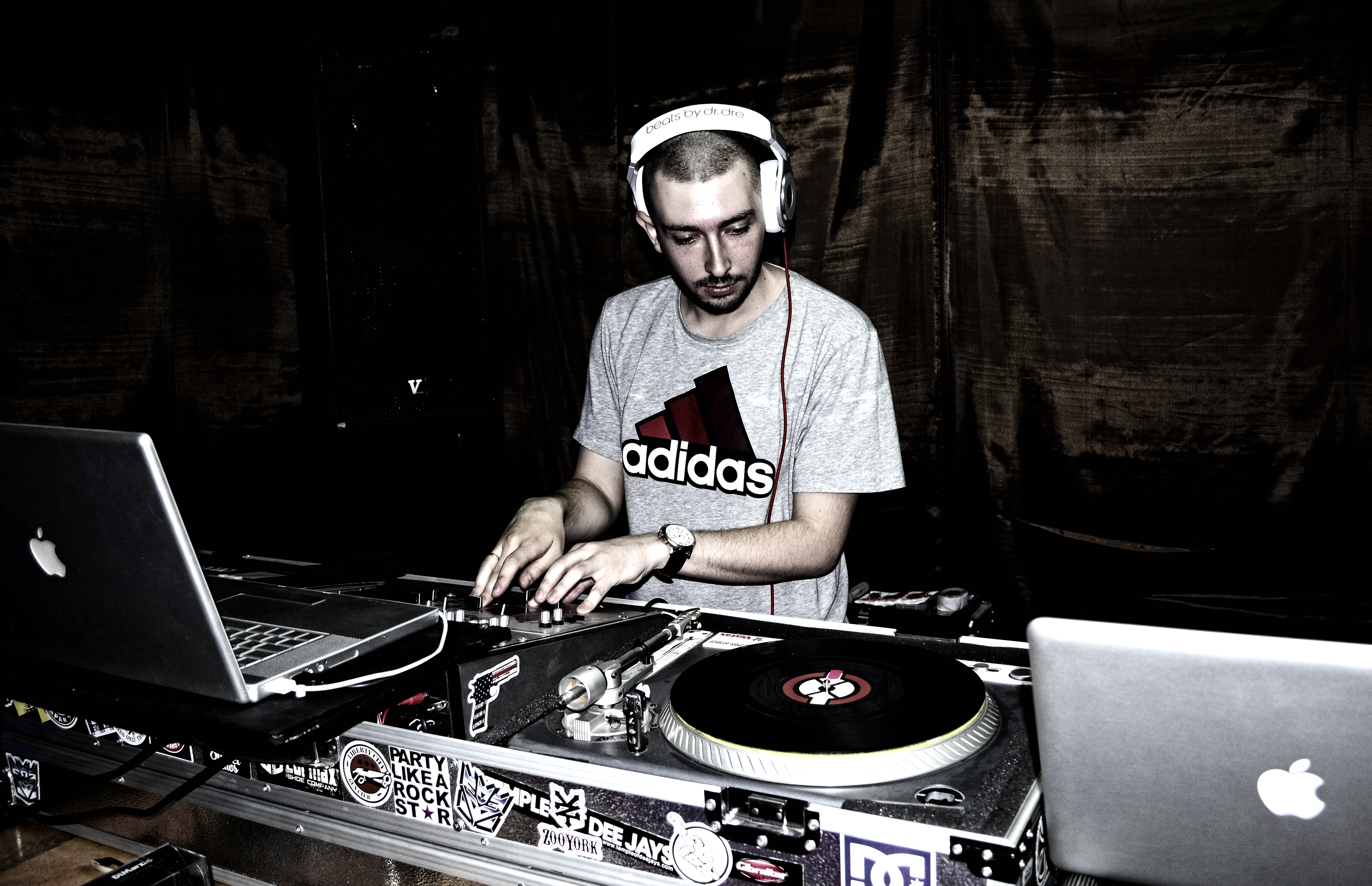
A Namibian DJ at work (DJ Basoff)

House music is played at raves in Africa, especially South Africa. African house is based on African traditional melodies. It is characterized by a fast moving beat with thin melodies and synthesizers. Sometimes it is accompanied by vocals.

=== Metal ===
Since the late 1990s some artists perform heavy metal in Namibia, among those the Arcana XXII, subMission, Delusion Of Grandeur, ScatterSoul. In 2007 the first Namibian festival took place with bands like CfD (USA), subMission (Namibia), Wrust (Botswana), Neblina (Angola), Delusion Of Grandeur (Namibia), followed by two other editions in 2008 and 2009 including artists like Lady Axe (South Africa), Juggernaught (South Africa), Azrail (South Africa).

=== Electronic music ===
In the late nineties an ex Mighty Dread singer (Yoba Valombola, known as Benga), bassist and guitarist came back from Germany with a big influence and eager in change and started an independent label called Big Rat Communication. This was fuelled by the idea of producing Namibia's first electronic music ranging from, Trip hop, Drum and bass, Dubstep and drumstep. Due to the unpopularity of electronic music in Namibia, Yoba released his music only in Europe and America under the name Benga. Most of the electronic music Benga release is based on his early experiments of Reggae, Shambo, blues and rock. Yoba went back to the west and returned again after six years to Namibia to influence other Namibians.

== Record labels ==
Notable Namibian record labels include:

- Mshasho Productions
- Gazza Music Productions
- Yaziza Entertainment

== See also ==
- List of Afrikaans singers
