= Zula II Survive =

Studio album by Gazza
- Released: 2004
- Genres: Kwaito, hip hop, dancehall
- Label: Gazza Music Productions
- Producer: Elvo

Gazza chronology
Tanauka (2004)	Zula II Survive (2004)	Stof-Lap Chikapute (2005)

Zula II Survive (literally: Beg to survive) is the second album by the Namibian kwaito artist Gazza. The album was more kwaito than his previous release, Tanauka, and until today is considered Gazza's best album. Zula II Survive together with The Dogg's Shimaliw' Osatana and Take Out Yo Gun are considered the first albums to have shaped the Namibian kwaito genre. The album also introduced Sunny Boy to the music industry. "Koko", "KKN" and "Zula II Zula" are the album's biggest hits.

It is the first album to be released on Gazza's own imprint G. M. P. Most of the production on the album was by Elvo.

== Track listing ==
1. "America (Intro)"
2. "Mr. Richman"
3. "KKN"
4. "Vuka Na ZoZo" feat. Pablo
5. "Tala Tala" feat. The Dogg
6. "Alicia (Skit)"
7. "Thank U" feat. Elvo & Dore
8. "Zula II Zula"
9. "My Father My Hero"
10. "Koko" feat. Sunny Boy
11. "Palapala"
12. "Kandishishi" feat. Pablo
13. "KKN [house mix]"
14. "Shidolodolo" feat. The Dogg
15. "Klaar (Skit)"
