= Mshasho Clothing =

Clothing brand

- thumb
- Industry: Apparel
- Founded: 2003
- Headquarters: Windhoek, Namibia, By VibeKing
- Key people: Martin "The Dogg" Morocky (Founder and CEO)
- Products: Clothing, footwear, fragrance and fashion accessories
- Owner: Mshasho closed corporation
- Website: http://www.mshashoonline.com/ http://www.mshashoarmy.com

Mshasho Clothing is a Namibian clothing brand founded by Martin "The Dogg" Morocky. The company is 100% owned by Mshasho closed corporation operating as a subsidiary. The name Mshasho is derived from its original name Omushasho which is the Oshiwambo name for a shotgun.

The company designs, outsource manufactures and supplies a wide range of clothing, shoes and jewellery in Namibia. It lays claim to the most successful clothing label designed and manufactured locally.

The line includes clothing and accessories inspired by The Dogg himself and street life. Mshasho Clothing produces cloths and accessories for men, women, and children. The female line includes tops, hot pants, and bikinis. In 2006 Mshasho Clothing expanded its line to include accessories such as bracelets, nametags, headwear, jewelry, handbags, and belts. Mshasho Clothing was interested in launching a range of sunglasses. In 2008, the line launched Mshasho throwback jerseys. Mshasho Clothing launched Flipflops, men's jeans and school bags in 2010.

Mshasho Clothing can be frequently seen being worn by The Dogg, OmPuff, Tre, Sunny Boy, Elvo, TeQuila, DJ Kboz, Fidel, among others. It has become a culture for Mshasho fans to wear Mshasho apparel when attending a show by an Mshasho artist or affiliated.

== Check out ==
- Mshasho Productions
