= This Is My Time (The Dogg album) =

Studio album by The Dogg
- Released: 3 April 2009
- Recorded: 2008
- Genre: Namibian kwaito, African house, hip hop, pop
- Label: Mshasho
- Producer: The Dogg, Elvo

The Dogg chronology
You Can't Ignore (2007)	This Is My Time (2009)	'' The Power of 7 - Elevating Elevators '' (2010)

This Is My Time is The Dogg's fifth studio album release by Mshasho Records. It was set for release on 16 October 2008, but was moved up to 30 November and later moved to 3 April 2009. The album is the first Dogg album to receive a Team Namibia sticker. The album features appearance by Gal Level, Sunny Boy, Qonja, Elvo, Jericho, Dixon, Ricardo, Nasti, OmPuff and Tre. The entire album is self produced.

The album debuted at number 1 on Namibia's Universal Records, selling close to 7000 copies at its launch. According to The Dogg, more than 2000 copies were already order by fans.

It received mixed reviews from critics and gained an average rating of 6/10. Many criticise the album for its pop-oriented sound and poor track listing. However, the album is praised for its excellent beats.

== Track listing ==
- All tracks produced by The Dogg, except for track 4 produced by Elvo and The Dogg

No.	Title	Length
1.	"Intro - Mshasho Family"	2:47
2.	"All My Love" (featuring Gal Level)	4:04
3.	"Call My Bluff" (featuring OmPuff & Elvo)	4:10
4.	"Mr. Dogg"	3:35
5.	"My Time"	4:15
6.	"On The Radio" (featuring Qonja & OmPuff)	4:00
7.	"Forget" (featuring Ricardo)	4:36
8.	"Wanna Be" (featuring Dixon)	3:50
9.	"I Owe you" (featuring Tre Van Die Kasie)	4:16
10.	"If You Care…" (featuring Sunny Boy, Jericho & Nasti)	4:09
11.	"Call My Bluff (Instrumental)"	4:10
12.	"On The Radio (Instrumental)"	3:45
