= Introducing TeeDee =

Introducing Tee Dee

Studio album by The Dogg
- Released: May 2006 (Namibia)
- Recorded: 2005
- Genre: Namibian kwaito, African house, hip hop
- Label: Mshasho, KOOL Productions
- Producer: The Dogg, Lucky Mereki, Jay Malgas

The Dogg chronology
Take Out Yo Gun (2004)	Introducing Tee Dee (2006)	You Can't Ignore (2007)

Introducing TeeDee is the third studio album by Namibian kwaito musician and producer The Dogg. It was released by Mshasho Productions in May 2006, and was the first to be managed by KOOL Productions. The album introduced his alias TeeDee to his fans. This album is a replacing recording for his bootlegged album Mshasho Mos! which was supposed to be released in December 2005. Introducing TeeDee include revised songs which were intended to be released on the bootleg album. The album's first single "Baby Don't Go" released in 2005 was very successful in the Southern African region and its video won the award for best newcomer at the 2007 Channel-O Spirit of Africa Music Video Awards.

The album also saw The Dogg take a substantially more predominant production role, most of it was self-produced, with collaboration from Lucky Mereki and Jay Malgas co-producing half of it.

The title of the album's theme was to introduce TeeDee (The Dogg) to the international platform.

== Track listing ==
No.	Title	Length
1.	"Things I Like" (featuring OmPuff)	4:51
2.	"Keengolo"	4:04
3.	"Sing My Song" (featuring Nasti)	3:20
4.	"Small Town Girl" (featuring Mlakisto)	4:41
5.	"My Heart Is Beating"	4:41
6.	"The Dogg is Here to Stay" (featuring Mlakisto)	4:05
7.	"Why?"	4:10
8.	"Nandi Pule"	4:16
9.	"Woof-Woof Anthem"	4:20
10.	"Baby Don't Go" (featuring Nasti & Sunny Boy)	4:02
11.	"Inakusha" (featuring Tre Van Die Kasie)	3:48
12.	"Like This"	3:44
13.	"Kankama"	4:59
