= Namibian Annual Music Awards =

Namibian award for achievements in music

- Awarded for: Outstanding achievements in the music industry of Namibia
- Sponsored by: MTC Namibia, Namibian Broadcasting Corporation
- Date: 2011-2020
- Country: Namibia
- Presented by: Namibian Broadcasting Corporation, MTC Namibia
- Website: http://www.nama.com.na

Television/radio coverage
- Network: Namibian Broadcasting Corporation

The Namibian Annual Music Awards (NAMA) ceremony was the biggest awards ceremony in Namibia. It was established in 2011 by MTC Namibia and the Namibian Broadcasting Corporation (NBC). They would award a NAMA trophy to musicians in recognition of their outstanding achievements in the music industry of Namibia. Along with the trophy, musicians receive sponsorships, endorsement deals and cash prizes.

The NAMAs were usually held in the capital Windhoek. It was broadcast live on DStv on an NBC channel. The show had international music judges, hosts and artists. The first NAMAs took place in May 2011 and the overall winners were Jericho (Best Male Artist) and Gal Level (Best Female Artist). The NAMAs came to a finale on 31 October 2020.

== Categories ==
Below is the full list of categories available at the Namibian Annual Music Awards.

- Best Afrikaans
- Best Ma/gaisa
- Best Oviritje
- Best Shambo
- Best Soukous/Kwasa
- Afro Pop (incl. Township Disco)
- Best Collaboration
- Best Gospel
- Best Kwaito
- Best R&B
- Best Rap/Hip-Hop
- Best Rock/Alternative
- Best House
- Best Reggae
- Best Kizomba
- Best Instrumental (incl. Jazz)
- Best Acapella
- Most Disciplined Artist
- Best Group or Duo
- Best Newcomer of the Year
- Best Single/Non Album
- Best International Achievement

== Winners ==
=== 2011 ===
- Best Afrikaans: Lownan - "Wambo Seun"
- Best Ma/gaisa: !Oubasen - "Ander donkie"
- Best Oviritje: Pouua Concert Group - "Ekuva"
- Best Shambo: Tunakie - Naghelo
- Best Soukous/Kwasa: Ndilimani Cultural Troupe - "Ndilimani"
- Best Afro Pop (incl. Township Disco): Uno Boy - "Take It Easy"
- Best Collaboration: Stefan Ludik - "Black girl White Boy"
- Best Gospel: D-Naff - "Jesus Oteya"
- Best Kwaito: Gazza - "Penduka"
- Best R&B: Berthold - "Friends with Benefits"
- Best Rap/Hip-Hop: Jericho - "He Ta Pa Te"
- Best Rock/Alternative: Stefan Ludik - "Kick it Up A Gear"
- Best House: Award withdrawn from Lady May for controversial behaviour
- Best Reggae: MN Johnson - "I Fear No Evil"
- Best Kizomba: Atushe - "Meme"
- Best Instrumental (incl. Jazz): Flamingo - "Oudjenda"
- Best Acapella: Mighty Vocals - "Amen"
- Best Traditional: Erna Chimu - "Telewaniba"
- Best Group or Duo: Gal Level - "Ohole"
- Best Newcomer of the Year: Berthold
- Best Single/Non Album: Ru "Million Dollar Chick"
- Best Music Video: Gazza - "Shukusha"
- Best Song of the Year: The Dogg - "Jabule"
- Best Male Artist: Jericho
- Best Female Artist: Gal Level
- Best Album: Gal Level (Next Level)
- Best Producer: Araffat
- Best International Achievement: Ees (Eric Sell)
- Most Disciplined Artist: Uno Boy
- Lifetime Achievement Award: The late Jackson Kaujeua

=== 2012 ===
- Best Afrikaans: Philip - "Alles Op Die Altaar"
- Best Ma/gaisa: Dixson - '/Namsaros"
- Best Oviritje: Ongoro Nomundu - "Ndjipo Ngoma Man!!"
- Best Shambo: Tyna - "Nand Otushekwa"
- Best Collaboration: Ees featuring Mandoza "Ayoba"
- Best Gospel: Caroline - "Libita"
- Best Kwaito: The Dogg - "Tromentos"
- Best R&B: Linda - "I Believe"
- Best Rap/Hip Hop: Catty Cat - "Letter From My Heart"
- Best Soukous/Kwasa: Waka - "Mondabo"
- Best Rock/Alternative: Famaz Attack - "First Song"
- Best House: TeQuila - "Party Tonight"
- Best Reggae: Gerry Dread - "Tjava Nawa"
- Best Kizomba: Atushe - "Amor"
- Best Instrumental/Jazz: TeQuila - "Kaveshishi"
- Best Acapella: Mighty Vocals - "Ena Ramuhona"
- Best Group/Duo: Paradox - "Baby"
- Best Newcomer: Linda - "I Believe"
- Best Single: Linda - "I Believe"
- Best Single/Non Album: Cyberspace - "That's Why"
- Best Traditional: Master Green - "!Gameb Kans"
- Best Music Video: Ees - "Ayoba"
- Most Disciplined Artist: Dixon
- Best Male Artist of the Year: Mushe
- Best Female Artist of the Year: TeQuila

=== 2013 ===
- Album of the Year: Damara Dikding - Beats From the Heart
- Song of the Year (public vote): Mushe - "Onkalamwenyo"
- Radio Song of the Year: Mushe
- Best Female Artist of the Year: Blossom
- Best Male Artist of the Year: Mushe - "Letter From the President"
- Lifetime Achievement Award: Papa Fransua
- Best International Achievement Award: The Dogg
- Best Producer: Damara Dikding
- Most Disciplined Artist of the Year: Exit
- Best Acapella: Ama-Khoe - "Neda"
- Best Afrikaans: S-Man - "Holliday"
- Best Afro Pop (inclusive of Township Disco): Mushe - "Letter From the President"
- Best Collaboration: Gazza - "Gazatt"
- Best Ma/gaisa: Damara Dikding - "Papa Se Ne"
- Best Gospel: D-Naff - 'What a Mighty God We Serve'
- Best Group or Duo: Tswazis - "Step by Step"
- Best House: Gazza - "Gazatt"
- Best Instrumental (inclusive of Jazz): Big Ben - "Social Avenue"
- Best Kizomba: Blossom - "Ondjila Yetu"
- Best Kwaito: Mushe - Mush - "Push"
- Best Music Video: Gazza - "Gimme Gimme"
- Best Newcomer of the Year: Blossom - "Komuthima Gwomeya"
- Best Non-Album Single: Sandra Blak - "Music"
- Best Oviritje: The Wire - "Eruru"
- Best R&B: Floritha - "I Owe It All to You"
- Best Rap/Hip Hop: Ru CuteGeek - "Sanity"
- Best Reggae: Bantusan Faridread @ Omidi D'Afrique - "Lovely Day"
- Best Rock/Alternative: Famaz Attak - "Live Fast Die Young"
- Best Shambo: Blossom - "Tilia ft. Tunakie"
- Best Single: Mushe - "Onkalamwenyo"
- Best Soukous/Kwasa: Sally - "Boss Maddam"
- Best Traditional: Kamati - "Omapenda"

== See also ==
- Jericho
- Channel O Music Video Awards
- Kora Awards
- Music of Namibia
