= PDK (Namibian music group) =

Nambilian boy-band

- Origin: Kwaito
- Years active: 2006-present
- Label: Omalaeti Music label
- Members: Patrick, Dion and Kamtonyo
- Website: http://pdklive.com

PDK is an all-male trio band from Namibia. They started off as dancers and were known as The Action Boys. Later they changed their name to Action Geez. Now they perform under the name of PDK which represents the initial of their first name. The group has performed in the Namibian Annual Music Awards. They have also performed in several other reputed award shows and events. Patrick is the lead singer of the group while Dion has a unique style. Kamtonyo is a median combination of the two. The group is known to take inspiration for its music from reality.They have been together over a decade.

== History ==
Patrick, Dion and Kamtonyo are a Namibian Kwaito trio popularly known as PDK.The group was officially launched in 2006, under the Omalaeti Music label. The name PDK is made up from the first letter of the member's names Patrick, Dion and Kamtonyo. Patrick Mwashindange was born at Onanjaba village in Ohangwena region, in 1985. Dion Auala was born in Luanda, Angola, in 1986, and Christian "Kamtonyo" Andreas was born in 1987, in Oshakati. All the group members schooled at Oshakati Senior Secondary School and that is where they all got to know each other.

All the three members were popular Kwaito and Pantsula dancers in their hometown Oshakati before they became friends and started to write and sing songs as a group in 1998. The group has featured on local songs like: The Dogg's "Live Life" with Tate Buti, Ees' "U My Lady".

== Music career ==
Over the past decade, the group has released nine albums and performed in many events and award shows. The group performed at Namibia's 30th independence anniversary celebrations.

The trio entered the music industry through their album Skoko. This gave them recognition and acceptance from their Namibian music fans. This album also helped them to achieve their first Namibian music award.

The group's sixth album Moko was released in December 2011. It received massive airplay on the local radio stations. The album has hit songs including "Dirty Kandeshi", "Moko" and "Bengusa".

The Group's ninth and latest album KEKAKU was released in 2014 among much fanfare. The album features Oshiwambo lyrics and many of its tracks are considered to be club bangers. The album also features traditional songs with slower beats. There is also heavy and unique use of African drums. The album comprises 20 songs.

The trio has been active in the Namibian entertainment scene and have collaborated with some of the country's biggest names in the music industry, these include Kwaito star and Channel O award winner The Dogg, kwaito star Ees and one of Namibia's highest selling artists Tate Buti, as well as a handful of local Namibian artists. They have also worked with Zambian artist Shyman and Maky2. They have also shared a stage with international artist such as Flavor, EVE, Oliver Mtukudzi, Freshly Ground and Ringo.

The band was also featured in DJ Siya's debut album.

== Awards ==
Their debut album Skoko, earned the group their first Namibian music award in the 'Best Duo-Group' category in the 2008 Sanlam-NBC music awards. In March 2012 the group withdrew from the controversial Namibian Annual Music Awards (NAMAs). The organizers released the nominees' list and PDK was not on it, this made a lot of Namibian music lovers to complain because they thought the group deserved to be nominated. Days later, the award's organizers made a public announcement that PDK not being nominated was a mistake, but this led to the group withdrawing from the awards because it was not initially nominated.

== Discography ==
The group has released twelve albums:

- Skoko - (2006)
- Paantu - (2008)
- Emanya - (2009)
- Kombingaa Ku - (2010)
- Ondjulufi - (2010)
- Moko (2011)
- Fiyotakushi - (2012)
- Kulupa nayo - (2013)
- Kekaku - (2014)
- KEMPU - (2015)
- ODIKWA - (2017)
- Grateful - (2019)
