= Stof-Lap Chikapute =

Studio album by Gazza
- Released: 2005
- Genre: Kwaito, hip hop, reggae, dancehall
- Label: Gazza Music Productions

Gazza chronology
Zula II Survive (2004)	Stof-Lap Chikapute (2005)	467/GMP Till I Die (2007)

Stof-Lap Chikapute is the third studio album by Gazza, released in 2005. Gazza adopted a more South African style of kwaito for this album, which includes production by Bu², Becoming Phil, and David Taren. This is Gazza's first album without an appearance by The Dogg. It includes the big hits Kick It, Nobody, Komesho & Summer Song

== Track listing ==
1. Intro
2. Verstaan
3. Bala Bala feat. Chester, Ghetto Son & Sgem1
4. Apa Naape
5. Fresh feat. Diksa
6. Kick It
7. Nobody
8. Komesho
9. Peng' Omito
10. Summer Song
11. My Love
12. Gangsta
13. Kick It (Remix) feat. Vambos
14. Chilizo feat. Chilizo & Propaganda
15. Afrikaans feat. Auntie Sousa
16. Jah
17. Kapuna/Ageko feat. Nicky
18. Ape Naape Reprise
