= Tanauka =

Studio album by Gazza
- Released: 2004
- Recorded: 2003
- Genres: Kwaito, hip hop, reggae, dancehall
- Label: RC-Ghetto

Gazza chronology
Tanauka (2004)	Zula II Survive (2004)

Tanauka is the first album by the Namibian musician Gazza. It was released by RC-Ghetto in February, 2004. It includes the hit songs "Ghetto Life" and "Shidolodolo" which both include his then best friend and label mate The Dogg. Production of the album was by Elvo. The album contains songs inspired by different genres.

== Track listing ==
1. "Pass-op Vir Die Hond"
2. "Ghetto Life" feat. The Dogg
3. "Zion Train"
4. "Kachu Kachu (Radio Edit)"
5. "M’China" feat. The Dogg & Pablo
6. "Pokolo"
7. "Super Large"
8. "Tanauka" feat. Petu
9. "Kaana Kange (Skit)"
10. "Babe (Oshiwambo Mix)"
11. "Kachu Kachu"
12. "Babe"
13. "Shidolodolo" feat. The Dogg
