= The Deception (album) =

Studio album by The Dogg
- Released: 2 July 2011 (Namibia)
- Recorded: 2011
- Genre: Kwaito, hip hop
- Label: Mshasho
- Producer: The Dogg

The Dogg chronology
Lets Celebrate (2010)	The Deception (2011)	The Deception 2

The Deception is the seventh studio album by Namibian kwaito star The Dogg. The album is released by The Dogg's Mshasho Productions on 2 July 2011. The album features international artists such as South African kwaito star Brickz and Zambian singer JK.

Other guest on the album includes Sunny Boy, Qonja, OmPuff, Tate Buti, PDK, Fresh Family, KK and Catty Catt.

== Track listing ==
- All songs written and produced by The Dogg

No.	Title	Length
1.	"Intro"	4:30
2.	"Do For Shoo" (featuring Qonja)	4:06
3.	"The Deception" (featuring KK)	4:24
4.	"End of Time" (featuring JK, Sunny Boy & OmPuff)	4:12
5.	"Beautiful Night" (featuring Fresh Family)	4:13
6.	"I Know" (featuring Exit)	5:38
7.	"Skit"	1:26
8.	"On My Grind" (featuring Catty Catt)	3:27
9.	"Live Life" (featuring Tate Buti & PDK)	4:11
10.	"Tromentos" (featuring Brickz & Sunny Boy)	3:17
