= This Is My Time =

This Is My Time may refer to:

- This Is My Time (Raven-Symoné album), 2004
- This Is My Time (The Dogg album), 2009
- "This Is My Time" (song), a 2000 song by Sasha
- "This Is My Time", a song by 3 Colours Red, from the album Revolt
- "This Is My Time", by Lecrae from the soundtrack of the 2020 video game Marvel's Spider-Man: Miles Morales
