= Atushe =

Namibian musician

Atushe (born John Namweya, 26 August 1976, Tsumeb, Namibia) is a Namibian musician, based in Windhoek, Namibia. With a career spanning nine years, he has produced numerous hits and five albums to date. Atushe started singing at an early age in a family choir, Sunday school then later on in a school choir. Atushe won a best body builder title in 2010.

== Discography ==
- 2nd Chance (Piracy/Poverty), 2011
- Imbo, 2009
- Tangi, 2008
- Credit for My Promise, 2006 (former name, Tyson)
- Oye Naana, 2005 (former name, Tyson)

== Music awards ==
- Best Kizomba, Namibian Music Awards (NAMA), 2012
- Best Kizomba, Namibian Music Awards (NAMA), 2011
- Best Music Video, Sanlam/NBC Music Awards, 2004

== Non music awards ==
- Namibia Bodybuilding Championship, 2010
