= Take Out Yo Gun =

Studio album by The Dogg
- Released: December 2004 (Namibia)
- Recorded: 2004
- Genre: Kwaito
- Label: Mshasho Records
- Producer: The Dogg, Elvo, Carl

The Dogg chronology
Shimaliw' Osatana (2004)	Take Out Yo Gun (2004)	Introducing TeeDee (2006)

Take Out Yo Gun is the second album by kwaito star The Dogg, released in December 2004. The album has received many positive reviews from critics despite the fact that it was released the same year as Shimaliw' Osatana. Take Out Yo Gun was the first album to be released on The Dogg's own label Mshasho Productions. Gazza appeared on the album, The Dogg also appeared on Gazza's Zula II Survive which marked the end of their collaboration.

The album's first single The Dogg Is Back became an anthem and topped the charts on various radio stations in the country. The album was very successful and won awards at the Sanlam-NBC Music Awards and the Namibian Music Awards. Take Out Yo Gun won Dogg his third artist of the year award at the Sanlam-NBC Music Awards which sent him on the France trip sponsored by the FNCC.

== Production ==
The entire album was produced by Elvo, and co-produced by The Dogg, except for track 1 which was produced by former Mshasho artist and producer, Carl.

== Track listing ==
No.	Title	Length
1.	"Cockroaches" (appearance by Gazza)	1:52
2.	"Ngenge Ndasi"	3:29
3.	"Take Out Yo Gun" (featuring Gazza)	4:04
4.	"The Dogg Is Back"	3:26
5.	"My Love"	4:10
6.	"It's Over" (featuring Luvy)	4:09
7.	"My Life"	4:05
8.	"Tsotsi Life" (Carl)	4:58
9.	"My Life - Remix" (featuring Gazza)	4:30
10.	"Tsotsi Life (Instrumental)"	4:58
11.	"My Life (Instrumental)"	4:05
