= Lady May (Namibian singer) =

Namibian singer (born 1986)

Lady May Africa
- Birth name: Martha Namundjebo
- Born: 20 December 1986 (age 38); Cuanza Sul, Angola
- Origin: Windhoek, Namibia
- Genres: R&B, Afro pop, house
- Occupation: singer
- Years active: 2004–present
- Labels: Turntable King Productions, Big Ear Records, Faluma Africa, D-Naff Records
- Website: www.faluma.com

Lady May (born Martha Namundjebo, 20 December 1986) is a Namibian singer. She came to fame in 2004 with the release of her first album Kamali which won her her first award at the Sanlam-NBC Music Awards. Namundjebo is one of the most popular female singers in Namibia. Her music is also recognized beyond the Namibian border and she has been nominated and won several awards at the Channel O Music Video Awards.

Lady May's music is a mixture of Oshiwambo traditional music and western pop. Most of her music is categorized under the Afro pop and house genre. Her early styles were a combination of R&B and hip hop. She was signed to a South African record label, Big Ear Records. Now signed to Namibia's no.1 gospel label D-Naff Records, where she just released a new soul soothing gospel album Unbroken which has 13 great songs, since she is born again Christian now.

Lady May was Namibia's celebrity housemate for the seventh season of Big Brother Africa, where she came out as runner-up.

== Early life ==
Martha was born in Angola from exiled parents at Calulo, a small village near Cuanza Sul. Just before Namibia's independence she returned with her parents and settled in Ovamboland and in 1994 she moved to Windhoek City.

== Music career ==
Lady May started to sing from the age of six, during her teenage years she started performing at school concerts. She recorded her first song "Lady for Life" with the help of producer Kanibal in 2004 which won her an award for Best Female Artist at the 2004 Sanlam-NBC Music Awards. In 2005 Martha released her debut album titled Kamali which means little Martha in her native language Oshiwambo.

Her second album Come And Get Me was released in 2006, it was a change in style as she was moving into the afro pop genre. The album included 3 hit songs "Come and Get Me", "Bubblgum" and the popular "Chokola" whose video received a lot of play on Channel O and MTVBase Africa. The video was shot in Namibia in two locations by Tim Huebschle as part of an MTVBase Africa initiative. The video also charted on the channel and won the award for Best Dance Video at the 2008 Channel O Music Video Awards.

In 2008 Martha performed at the Big Brother Africa 3 eviction show in Johannesburg, South Africa.

In 2009 Lady May teamed up with DJ Kboz's label Turntable King Productions and music management company Great Wings Promotions to produce and release her third album, Pink Chocolate. She was later featured on a hit song titled "Dana (Namibia Get Crazy)" by South African DJ/musician Bojo Mujo. This song propelled Bojo Mujo's album Session 6 to sell more than 50 000 copies between Namibia and South Africa. Lady May and fellow Namibian singer TeQuila would later receive a platinum awards for their appearance on the album as 50 000 copies in South Africa represent a platinum plaque.

In December 2009, Lady May was invited by a Germany based NGO called AfricAvenir to perform at Haus der Kulturen der Welt in Berlin.

In January 2011, Lady May signed to Big Ear Records in South Africa she released an album "I AM:African Goddess" which was executive produced by M-Poser Boss. She went to make history as the first Namibian to be released in South Africa and played on South African radios.

On 4 June 2011 May received the Namibian Annual Music Awards in the category "Best House Music", however, after verbally attacking the audience she was sent out of the hall and had to give back the award. She apologized through a press conference on 7 June 2011.

== Albums ==
- 2005: Kamaali
- 2006: Come And Get Me
- 2009: Pink Chocolate'
- 2010: Tiger Ambitions
- 2011: I AM: African Goddess (Big Ear Records, South Africa)
- 2013: Crazy Desires (Crazy Lady May Records)
- 2019: Unbroken (D-Naff Records)
