= The Power of 7 – Elevating Elevators =

The Power of 7 - Elevating Elevators

Studio album by The Dogg
- Released: 30 April 2010 (Namibia)
- Recorded: 2009
- Genre: Kwaito, hip hop
- Label: Mshasho
- Producer: The Dogg, Elvo

The Dogg chronology
This Is My Time (2009)	The Power of 7 - Elevating Elevators (2010)	Lets Celebrate (2010)

The Power of 7 – Elevating Elevators is the sixth studio album by The Dogg. It was officially released on 30 April 2010 in Windhoek. The album features artists such as Betholdt, Nasti, OmPuff, K.K., and Biblos among others.

The first single, "Take You Home Tonight" was released in December 2009 and has received massive airplay and entered charts on most radio stations. The second single, "The New Michael Jackson" was released in January 2010.

The album contains three bonus music videos.

== Track listing ==
- All songs written and produced by The Dogg

No.	Title	Length
1.	"Intro"	1:32
2.	"Mshasho Army" (featuring OmPuff & Makuva of Magogoz)	3:56
3.	"What You Want" (featuring KK & Betholdt)	3:46
4.	"Scary Movie"	5:15
5.	"Jabule" (featuring Biblos & OmPuff)	3:55
6.	"Wazup" (featuring Qonja)	3:42
7.	"Take You Home Tonight" (featuring Betholdt)	4:58
8.	"Mover"	3:52
9.	"New Michael Jackson"	4:29
10.	"Party Freak" (featuring Tre Van Die Kasie & Tsisi)	3:35
11.	"Dreams" (featuring Nasti)	3:31
12.	"Take You Home - Instrumental"	4:48
13.	"Mshasho Army - Instrumental"	3:41
