= Young, Black en Gifted =

Studio album by Sunny Boy
- Released: December 2005 (Namibia)
- Recorded: 2005
- Genre: hip hop, kwaito, hikwa
- Label: Mshasho Productions
- Producer: The Dogg (exec.), Elvo, DJ Kboz

Sunny Boy chronology
Young, Black en Gifted (2005)	Elai Lineendunge (2006)

Young, Black en Gifted, commonly referred to as Y.B.G., is Sunny Boy's debut album, released in December 2005 after he was signed to Mshasho Records in 2004. Young, Black en Gifted boosted Sunny's commercial popularity, thus making him a common household name among mainstream music fans. The album also established Sunny as one of the most profound lyrics in Namibia. Most of the tracks features a fusion of hip hop and kwaito. Production comes from The Dogg, Elvo and DJ Kboz.

The song "Best of Both Worlds" performed by Faizel MC featuring The Dogg and Sunny Boy was added to the album as a bonus track.

== Track listing ==
1. "Intro" (appearance by DJ Kboz, produced by DJ Kboz)
2. "Obuntuwambantu" feat. The Dogg, (produced by The Dogg)
3. "This Life" feat. The Dogg, (produced by The Dogg)
4. "Nyuku Nyuku" feat. Chipolopolo & Luvy (produced by Elvo)
5. "Ogwediva Omtata" (produced by The Dogg)
6. "Balance" (produced by Elvo)
7. "Memories (Skit)" (with DJ Kboz)
8. "Memories" feat. TeQuila, (produced by DJ Kboz)
9. "Oshoikengaho" (produced by DJ Kboz)
10. "Together" feat. TeQuila & Richie, (produced by The Dogg)
11. "Freestyle Section" (with DJ Kboz)
12. "Serious" feat. TeQuila, (produced by The Dogg)
13. "Young, Black en Gifted" feat. Chipolopolo, (produced by Elvo)
14. "Oshoaikengaho (Instrumental)" (produced by DJ Kboz)
15. "Together (instrumental)"(produced by The Dogg)
16. Bonus Track-"Best of Both Worlds" feat. Faizel MC & The Dogg, (produced by The Dogg)
17. Bonus Track-"Balance (Kboz Remix)" (produced by DJ Kboz)
