= Jericho (rapper) =

Namibian Rapper

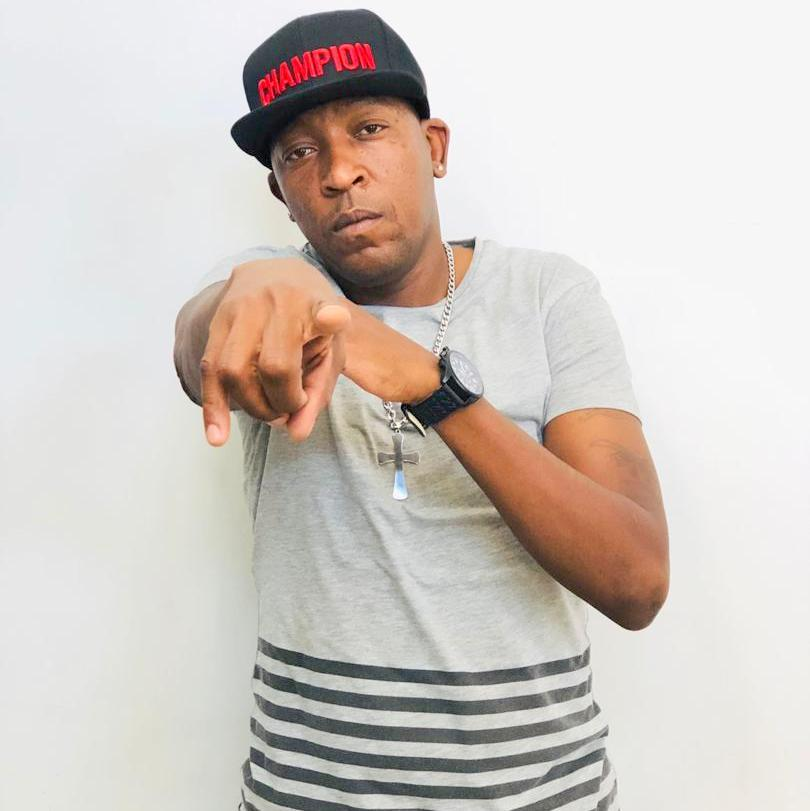
- Jericho at a video shoot.

Background information
- Birth name: Jericho Jerome Gawanab
- Also known as: Jericho
- Born: May 21, 1980 (age 45); Windhoek, Namibia
- Genres: Hip Hop; Kwaito; Ma/gaisa
- Occupations: Rapper; Songwriter; Record Producer; Entrepreneur
- Years active: 2004–present
- Labels: Ghetto Child
- Website: YouTube, Twitter, Instagram, Facebook

Jericho Gawanab (born 21 May 1980), is a Namibian rapper, songwriter, and entrepreneur. He won the Best Male Artist at the Namibian Annual Music Awards (2011) becoming the first hip-hop artist to do so.

After establishing Ghetto Child, his record label, he rose to fame with the release of his debut studio album, Check Who's Back (2006). Gawanab, professionally known as Jericho, continued his success by releasing studio albums which include: Lights Out (2007); Street Fame (2010); Let Me Be Me (2014) which features major South African rapper Cassper Nyovest and the legendary Hip Hop Pantsula; The Walls of Jericho (2016), The Recovery (2020) and The Signature (2024).

== Early life ==
Jericho Jerome Gawanab was born 21 May 1980 in Windhoek, the capital city of Namibia and was raised by his single mother in the city's Katutura township. In an article, Jericho stated that the street became his father and at the age of 18 he was sentenced to 5 years in prison. After being released in 2004, he pursued Hip Hop music.

== Music career ==
=== 2005: Check Who's Back ===
In 2006, Jericho established his record label, Ghetto Child, and released his debut studio album Check Who's Back. He achieved major critical success with the album. His lead single, “Check Who’s Back”, was a reintroduction of himself on the scene after being incarcerated. His second single, “Still Love You”, featuring Dixon was released and also received positive reviews.

=== 2007: Lights Out ===
With the success of Check Who’s Back, Jericho released his sophomore studio album, Lights Out. The album's lead single, “Lights Out”, featuring Prolific Oracle was Jericho turning off the spotlight on the new rappers that emerged claiming to be the best rappers in the country. The second single, "To My Fans", was Jericho thanking his fans for all their support and it received positive reviews. The third hit single “I’m Still Ghetto” was a reminder to everyone who claimed that Jericho changed since he became famous that he was still the same ghetto child.

=== 2010: Street fame ===
Jericho released in 2010 titled Street Fame produced by Araffath. It was critically acclaimed.

The lead single was “Heaven’s Missing Angel” followed by “Yabona” and then “He Ta Pa Te” featuring Tunakie and Max T which were all released with music videos shot by Ogopa Deejays. Jericho released two more singles “Helele” and “Say You Say Me” from the album. In 2011, Street Fame won three awards at the 2011 Namibian Annual Music Awards including the Best Male Artist which was the first ever time for a Hip Hop artist.

=== 2014: Let Me Be Me ===
Jericho released his fourth major studio album, Let Me Be Me in 2014. The album received generally positive reviews. The album's lead single, “Let Me Be Me”, was Jericho telling critics to let him be. It was controversial because he had a feud with former record producer Araffath. The second single, “Am I Dreaming”, was followed by "I'm Still Here" featuring Sally Boss Madam. The third single "We The Greatest" features Lil D, Sunny Boy, and The Dogg. The fourth single Jericho released from the album “Los My Uit” was a collaboration with Cassper Nyovest and Hip Hop Pantsula (HHP). This was followed by"I Promise".

=== 2016: The Walls of Jericho ===
The name of the fifth studio album was inspired by the events in the Bible. It has singles such as "Don't Change On Me", it features Sunny Boy and Exit on "Keep It Silent" and on "Starting All Ova” he features DJ Dozza. The album received mixed reviews.

=== 2020: The Recovery ===
Jericho battled depression. He became a born-again Christian. After a four-year hiatus from the music industry, Jericho made a comeback and released The Recovery. It spawned hit singles such as: "Shibobo", "Khoeb Khoes", "The Recovery", "Omundu Ouandje" and "As Men We Can". The album received positive reviews by critics and they praised Jericho's lyrical abilities.

=== 2024: The Signature ===
Jericho released on 3 May 2024 his seventh studio album, The Signature.

== Feuds ==
=== Sanlam NBC Music Awards ===
Jericho engaged in a public dispute with Sanlam NBC Music Awards because they allowed The Dogg who is a Kwaito artist to enter the Best Rap category.

=== Black Vulcanite ===
A rapper named Milk had beef with Jericho and released a diss track. J-Black

J-Black released a diss track.

== Araffath ==
Producer Araffath accused Jericho of failing to settle his studio fees, but apparently, they had a barter agreement. The agreement was for Jericho to make an album while Araffath got the exposure he direly needed. Jericho raps about Araffath and other critics in the 2014 song Let Me Be Me.

=== Gazza ===
Jericho engaged in another public dispute with Gazza and Gazza Music Productions (GMP) artists. An incident occurred that led to Jericho being hospitalized after getting into a violent fight with journalist and GMP employee, Chris-Paul “Krespo” Haingura.

According to an article, during a GMP event where Jericho was booked to perform, he was being mistreated and when he complained about it to the organisers Krespo got into a fight with Jericho and stabbed him with a broken bottle in the face and right hand. Jericho opened a case of attempted murder at NamPol against Krespo. Krespo however claimed that he too laid assault charges against Jericho and said that he stabbed Jericho in self-defence because Jericho hit him first.

== Controversies ==
=== Legal issues ===
Jericho has allegations against him that he assaulted his then-girlfriend, his former business partner popularly known as “Webster”, Krespo, and robbed a Namibian Defence Force soldier.

== Christianity ==
In 2018 Jericho decided to do away with his old life, repented, and gave his life to God becoming born again. In an interview on The Tribe, he stated that he moved out of Windhoek City to the town of Karibib.

== Awards ==
Awards and recognitions
Year	Award	Category / Title	Result
2011	Namibian Annual Music Awards	Best Rap/Hip-Hop (Street Fame)	Won
2011	Namibian Annual Music Awards	Best Producer (Street Fame)	Won
2011	Namibian Annual Music Awards	Best Male Artist (Street Fame)	Won
2024	Energy FM	Certificate of Recognition	Won

== Discography ==
- 2006 Check Who’s Back
- 2007 Lights Out
- 2010 Street Fame
- 2014 Let Me Be Me
- 2016 The Walls of Jericho
- 2020 The Recovery
- 2024 The Signature
