= Sally Boss Madam =

- Birth name: Sally Ephraim Keya
- Born: May 13, 1986 (age 39); Katatura, Namibia
- Genres: Afro pop; R&B; world
- Occupation(s): Singer, songwriter
- Years active: 2012–present
- Labels: Boss Madam Productions

Sally Ephraim Keya, professionally known first as "Sally" and later as "Sally Boss Madam" (born 13 May 1986), is a Namibian Afro-fusion singer and performer. Her music has won top awards at the Namibian Annual Music Awards (NAMAs) in two different musical genres: soukous/kwasa (2013) and Afropop (2020). She was also named Best Female Artist in Southern Africa at the 2016 All Africa Music Awards (AFRIMA).

== Early life ==
Sally Boss Madam was born and raised in Katutura, a township five km north of Windhoek created when the local government between 1959 and 1964 forcibly moved Windhoek's entire black population there. She took part in church choirs and began being asked to sing solos when she was eight years old. In her teens, she started playing a keyboard and singing background vocals for other performers.

In 2010, she married Bosley Keya, a music producer and DJ also known as DJ Kboz. The pair had met in 2008. The couple have one son and were in 2017 named "favorite celebrity couple of the year" at the Simply You Magazine Lifestyle and Fashion Awards. In 2020, however, they announced that they would end their marriage but continue their musical collaboration.

== Music career ==
Sally Boss Madam and her husband DJ Kboz worked together for three years on her first album Courage before its release in 2012. One song from that album "Boss Madam" (a term coined by Sally that later became part of her professional name) "skyrocketed to the top of each and every music countdown" according to The Namibian and became a feminist anthem.

In 2013, she won (under the name "Sally) the Namibian Annual Music Awards (NAMAs) in the category "Best Soukous/Kwasa". ("Soukous" is music derived from Congolese rumba but faster and more intricate; kwasa is a dance style associated with soukous.)

Her second album I Am Mukwanekamba, released in 2016, included a range of African musical styles including percussion. It was also in 2016 that her single "Natural" won the All Africa Music Award (AFRIMA) for Best Female Artist in Southern Africa.

Her 2017 album My Black got positive reviews that also commented on its range of genres, with The Namibian citing its "varying sounds from soukous, dancehall, gospel, house and an overall urban vibe" while another review mentions also rhythm and blues plus Afro-pop. The song "What You Say" from this album was nominated for the 2018 African Music Industry's Afrika People's Choice award in the category Best Female Southern Artist.

== Discography ==
=== Albums ===
- Courage (2012)
- I Am Mukwanekamba (2016)
- My Black (2017)
- Lucky Girl (2019)

=== Singles ===
- "Bim Bim" ft Bussiwa
- "Natural"
- "What You Say"
- "Fasuluka"

== Awards ==
=== NAMA AWARDS ===
Year	Nominee / work	Award	Result
2011	Whistler	Best Single	Nominated
2013	Sally Boss Madam	Best Soukous/ Kwasa	Won
2016	Sally Boss Madam ft Bussiwa	Best Single / Bim Bim	Nominated
2017	Sally Boss Madam	Best Single	Won
2017	Sally Boss Madam	Song Of The Year	Won
2018	Sally Boss Madam	Best Album / My Black	Nominated
2018	Sally Boss Madam	Best Female Artist	Nominated
2018	Sally Boss Madam ft KP Illest	Best Collaboration / I Need You	Nominated
2018	Sally Boss Madam	Best Music Video / What you say	Won
2018	Sally Boss Madam	Best RnB / Ecstacy	Nominated
2018	Sally Boss Madam	Song of the Year / What You Say	Nominated
2018	Sally Boss Madam	Female artist of the year	Won
2020	Sally Boss Madam	best Afropop	Won

=== AFRIMA ===
Year	Nominee / work	Award	Result
2016	Sally Boss Madam	Best Female Artist Southern Africa	Won
2017	Sally Boss Madam	Best Female Artist Southern Africa	Nominated

=== AFRIMMA ===
Year	Nominee / work	Award	Result
2017	Sally Boss Madam	Best Female Artist Southern Africa	Nominated

=== AMI Afrika People's Choice Awards ===
Year	Nominee / work	Award	Result
2018	Sally Boss Madam	Best Female Southern Artist	Won
