= D-Naff =

Namibian singer

- Born: Naftalie Shigwedha Amukwelele; 1 January 1974 (age 52); Ongandjera, Ovamboland, Namibia
- Origin: Eendombe, Ongandjera, Namibia
- Genres: Gospel, Christian music
- Occupations: Musician, preacher, speaker, actor, Immigration Officer
- Years active: 1998–present
- Label: D-Naff Entertainment
- Website: http://www.d-naff.com

Naftalie Shigwedha Amukwelele (born 1 January 1974) commonly known as D-Naff, is a Namibian multiple award-winning and top selling gospel rapper, actor and a former street gangster. D-Naff sings inspirational religious music in the style of kwaito, hip hop, kizomba, dancehall and afro-pop. D-Naff is also a motivational and inspirational speaker and has visited more than 100 schools, Universities and colleges in Namibia including the Namibia University of Science and Technology, Windhoek College of Education, Ongwediva College of Education and the University of Namibia.

== Early life ==
As a young boy he grew up "takandeke", a traditional popular fight among the Aawambo young men practiced as an initiation into manhood, as well as swimming in the plains and wells during or after rainy seasons with his friends, and hunting in the forests. Time and again he would come back home with his shorts torn from all the climbing and adventure. He attended Eendombe Combined School and later Namibia English Primary School in Windhoek the Capital City of Namibia. This was after his father returned from exile after taking part in the liberation struggle of Namibia and took the then young man to the city to gain some education for the purpose of becoming better in life. This dream became a reality in D-Naff’s life, however, without his father’s presence to witness what the world would refer to as D-Naff. His father died in 1998 while D-Naff was in France at the world cup performing during the world cup with his first musical group, The Glamour Boys. He matriculated at Augustineum Secondary School and went on to enroll in the National Youth Choir as well as the mighty Cantare Audire under the mentorship of the talented conductor, Ernst Von Biljorn. He is currently serving as an Immigration officer in the Ministry of Home Affairs, Immigration, Safety and Security's head office Windhoek, Namibia.

== Personal life ==
D-Naff is married to Dainess Ziba, originally from Chingola, Zambia, who is also a Gospel artist and his back-up singer and the two travel together on his tours.

== Career ==
He started his music career back in the early 90s while still a student at "Jan Jonker Afrikaner Secondary School" in Windhoek Namibia, under a group called the "Glamour Boys" which was an acappella group whose five members were all part of the National Youth Choir of Namibia, under the leadership of Conductor Mr Erenst Von Biljon. The group toured France in 1998, during the soccer world cup under the sponsorship of the Franco-Namibian Cultural Center FNCC. After giving his life to Jesus, D-Naff went on to establish a Gospel hip-hop group called Eagles in Flight which later became Heaven's Dialect. After the exodus of the Group's producer to U.S.A., the group disbanded and D-Naff went on to establish another group called "Eagle's Mentality" which became the winner of the 2005 "Best Gospel" at the Sanlam-NBC Music Awards. To date he has won more than fifteen (15) awards including at the NAMAS/ U.S.A./ Canada. He is ranked number 15 most downloaded artist on iTunes in Africa and number two in his home country after the Dogg at the time.

D-Naff has served as the (goodwill) Ambassador for the National Youth Council of Namibia (NYC). He has in 2014 been appointed Kora Awards goodwill Ambassador 2014/2015 to Namibia, in the fight against the Ebola virus, joining 53 other African artists and musicians who are also Kora Awards Ambassadors in their respective nations, and together they raise awareness on the Ebola virus and also to raise funds to be sent to the organizations dealing with the epidemic. They are to approach their Presidents, political leaders, business communities and the entire nation to join the Kora movement.(See Kora website). His duties as National Youth Council of Namibia Ambassador include: addressing the Namibian youth countrywide on matters facing them, being the spokesperson for them, motivating and inspiring them to be the best they can be and to live a life full of meaning. D-Naff was also a member of a Choral group called Cantare Audire, under the leadership of Mr. Ernst von Biljon at the college of the Arts. Through his career as a musician, he has toured the United States, Europe and Africa.

== Music ==
He released his first solo album entitled Oshagwana in 2006 which made him more popular. In 2007 he released his second album entitled Iikele Yuuyuni Mbu which won him an award at the Namibian Music Awards in the gospel category with his song, "Tsipi Tsipi". His third album Above The Limit was released in early 2008. He is currently the best selling Gospel artist in Namibia, and the country's top and most requested performing Gospel star. He has collaborated with international artist such as: Sabastian Magacha from Zimbabwe, Marvin B3 Kasomo, Mark B3 Kasomo, Prince Keddy, Ephraim Mutalange, Ty2, Damiano, Chola Chola and Tio both from Zambia. His music enjoys airplay in all radio stations across the country as well as Radio Phoenix and ZNBC in Zambia. He has released 11 albums to date. Namgospel United is a gospel movement consisting of various gospel Artists, singers and musician from Namibia which he founded with the aim of uniting gospel artists from within Namibia. The group is open to all gospel artists.

== Discography ==
=== Solo albums ===
- 2006:Oshagwana
- 2007:Iikele Yuuyuni Mbu
- 2008:Above The Limit
- 2009:The Untold Truth
- 2010:Reloaded
- 2011:Undisputed
- 2012:Greatest hits
- 2013:Eschatology
- 2014:Reborn
- 2015:Demon proof
- 2016:The Light That Shines
- 2017:D-Naff vs Naftalie
- 2018:The Illegal Book
- 2019:Epangulo

== Other albums ==
- 2005:Otweya By Eagles' Mentality
- 2015:A Design of Destiny By Dyna
- 2015:Omagumbo by Christmas
- 2016:Ombago Y'omkongo By Christmas
- 2016:Ondaka yange By Steven Side
- 2017:Set Apart By Lady Dyna
- 2020:Unbroken By Lady May Africa

== Awards ==
To date twelve (12) awards have been won under D-Naff Entertainment locally and three (3) Internationally.

- 1x Best Shambo (Sanlam /NBC Music Awards.
- 1x Most discipline Artist of the year (NAMAS. 2016
- 1x Most Socially Responsible Artist of the year (NAMAS.2015
- 2x Best Gospel Artist (Sanlam NBC Music Awards.
- 1x Best Gospel Artist (NAMAS.2013
- 1x Best Gospel Artist (NAMAS).2011
- 1x Best Gospel Artist (NAMAS)2015
- 1x Male Artist of the year (NGOMA 2018)
- 1X Best Reggae (NAMAS).2018

== Other Awards ==
2017 Namas Best Tradition by Christmas 2018 Ngoma Best Album by Lady Dyna

NB: NAMAS - Namibia Annual Music Awards

   NGOMA - Namibia Gospel Awards
