= Gal Level =

- Daphne (left) and Frieda (right) back stage at a concert

Background information
- Origin: Windhoek, Namibia
- Genres: R&B, pop, Afro-pop
- Occupations: Musician, songwriter
- Years active: 2000–present
- Label: Ogopa/Butterfly
- Members: Daphne; Frieda
- Website: Butterfly Ogopa Deejays

Gal Level is a R&B female duo from Windhoek, Namibia, made up of Daphne Willibard (born 1 April 1981) and Frieda Haindaka (born 1 February 1984). They are very popular in Southern Africa, and other African countries. They are produced and managed by continental music producers Ogopa Deejays of Kenya. They have been compared to US girl group Destiny's Child.

== Career ==
The duo have lived together for 8 years in Windhoek city. They started their career late in the 1990s as members of the hip hop group Dungeon Family. The grouped released one album in 2000 before it broke up. After Dungeon Family broke up, the girls reconnected with Sula in 2003 who was the manager of Dungeon Family. Sula eventually signed them to his record label, Butterfly Entertainment.

=== Music ===
Gal Level's music is a fusion of rhythm and blues, Afro-pop, and dancehall inspired by life and by issues in Namibian society and is popular in southern Africa. The girls released their first single "Shake It" in mid-2004, which created them a buzz and reintroduced them to mainstream music fans. The song also earned them comparison to Destiny's Child. Their second single "Go Back to Her" was also successful, it earned them a Channel O nomination. The two songs became street anthems during 2004 and 2005 and won separate awards at the Sanlam-NBC Music Awards.

== Discography ==
- 2004: Shake It
- 2007: Act Like You Know

== Awards ==
- 2005

Sanlam-NBC Music Awards

Best Newcomer
Best R&B

- 2006

Sanlam-NBC Music Awards

Best Group
Best R&B

Namibian Music Awards

Best Group
Best R&B
Best female vocalist

Channel O Music Video Awards

Best Newcomer (nominated)
Best Afro-pop (nominated)

- 2007

Channel O Music Video Awards

Best African Group – (nominated)

- 2008

Channel O Music Video Awards

Best African Southern (nominated)
Best R&B Video

Kora Awards

Best Female Group Southern Africa –(nominated)
