= Shimaliw' Osatana =

Studio album by The Dogg
- Released: February 2004 (Namibia)
- Recorded: 2003
- Genre: Kwaito, hardcore
- Label: RC-Ghetto Records
- Producer: Elvo, Big Ben

The Dogg chronology
Shimaliw' Osatana (2004)	Take Out Yo Gun (2004) --- Omalaeti O'Swapo (2004)

Shimaliw' Osatana is the debut album by Namibian kwaito master The Dogg, released in February 2004 through RC-Ghetto Records. Shimaliw' Osatana was the first full length kwaito album released in Namibia. The album was immediately hailed as a masterpiece by several critics, and is today one of the most celebrated and influential albums in Namibia. Shimaliw' Osatana (in Oshiwambo; Money Is Evil), established The Dogg as one of the most profound lyricists in Namibia, introducing his signature rough attitude style.

== Overview ==
Shimaliw' Osatana combines hardcore hitting kwaito with socially meaningful lyrics. It was released at a time when Namibia was lacking potential musician. The album represents one of the most influential kwaito albums of Namibia, and is considered an archetypal album of Namibia's kwaito genre. The album won the best album award, best kwaito song, and artist of the year at the 2004 Sanlam-NBC Music Awards. It gave Dogg his second chance to win the artist of the year award. Shimaliw' Osatana is also consider as Dogg's best album by several critics. The album also earned The Dogg comparison to Mandoza and DMX, due to his rough voice.

=== Production and guest ===
The album was produced by Elvo and Big Ben. Big Ben produced two songs while Elvo produced the rest. There are no guest appearances on the album. Although Gazza contributes background chorus supporting-vocals on "Mamma", he was not credited as a guest. Elvo also mixed the entire album. The album holds a record of being Dogg's only album without a guest.

== Track listing ==
No.	Title	Producer(s)	Length
1.	"Intro"	Elvo	0:38
2.	"Shimaliw' Osatana"	Elvo	4:50
3.	"Jesus Otati"	Elvo	4:18
4.	"Mama" (background vocals by Gazza)	Big Ben	4:08
5.	"Oshike Shili Next"	Elvo	4:01
6.	"Onayena No. 9"	Big Ben	3:32
7.	"Perfecto Tromentos"	Elvo	3:54
8.	"Shimaliw' Osatana (Instrumental)"	Elvo	4:44
9.	"Mama (Instrumental)"	Big Ben	4:08
10.	"Outro"	Elvo	0:47
