= Tre Van Die Kasie =

- Also known as: VDK 1560, Van Die Kasie
- Born: Tretius Kauhangengo; 1981 (age 44–45); Omaruru, South West Africa
- Genres: Kwaito, hip hop, house
- Occupations: musician, songwriter
- Years active: 2006–present
- Label: Mshasho Productions
- Website: Mshasho Online

Tretius Kauhangengo (born 1981), better known as Tre Van Die Kasie and most commonly referred to as Tre is a Namibian kwaito musician and rapper. Tre rose to fame after signing with Mshasho Productions in 2005. He is the half brother of fellow kwaito musician, Kavax.

== Biography ==
Tre was born and raised in Omaruru where he lived with his mother for his entire childhood life. He moved to Windhoek City to attend secondary school Ella du Plessis High School in Khomasdal. Tre later enrolled at the University of Namibia where he met The Dogg and Sunny Boy.

=== Music career ===
Tre and The Dogg became very good friends and started writing songs together during their years at the University of Namibia. The Dogg dropped out of the University in 2003 to focus his career on music. After gaining success in the music industry, he created his record label, Mshasho Productions. Although Tre was committed to his studies, he signed with Mshasho in 2005 to support his friend. From then on he traveled and performed with The Dogg and other Mshasho artists. After a year, Tre established himself as a solo artist in the Mshasho stable and started working on his album. Tre's lyrical abilities earned him success and respect in both the underground and mainstream music scenes.

Tretius appeared on The Dogg's albums Introducing TeeDee, You Can't Ignore, This Is My Time and The Power of 7 . He has also appeared on Sunny Boy's, The Sleeping Giant, and several underground songs by other musicians.

=== Style ===
Tre raps and sings; he sings the hook on Dogg's Channel-O award winning song, "Can U Feel It". He also sings on his own tracks, "Eedula Odaya" and "When Im Gone".

=== Bible and My Music, God & Me ===
Tre released his debut album in mid-2008. The album was launched at the fifth Mshasho anniversary in Zoo Park. It contains hardcore-kwaito tracks mixed with house and hip hop. The album is primarily produced by The Dogg and Elvo and feature guest appearances by Sunny Boy, OmPuff, Kavax, D-Sound, DJ Kboz, and Jewelz. Although highly anticipated prior to its release, the album failed to meet sales expectations. This was due to its poor marketing from Mshasho. No video was released for the album's promotion.

=== Second studio album ===
Since 2008 Tre has been on music hiatus. In 2009 several rumours were made regarding the rapper's second album. Although not confirmed by Tre or Mshasho, an album was due in 2010 titled Straight From the Kasie. In 2011, while promoting his seventh album, Mshasho CEO The Dogg confirmed that Tre would release an album in 2011.

== Awards ==
- 2008: Sanlam-NBC Music Awards

Best Collaboration (nominated)
Best House (nominated)

== Discography ==
- 2008: Bible and My Music, God & Me
