= TeQuila =

- Born: Tekla Iita; 27 January 1985 (age 41); Cuanza Sul, Angola
- Origin: Windhoek, Namibia
- Genres: R&B, Afro pop, house
- Occupation: singer
- Instrument: Vocals
- Years active: 2005–present

Tekla Iita (born 27 January 1985) better known as Tequila (often stylized as TeQuila) is a Namibian singer.

== Music career ==
Tekla started her career as a featuring artist in, first appearing on Sunny Boy's sophomore breakthrough hit single "Serious", for his debut album Young, Black en Gifted. Her appearance on the song brought her more attention, as she began getting popular. She appeared on two more songs from Young, Black en Gifted. Later that year, with the help of producer, Stalin Kapembe, she started recording her own songs. Her first single was "Who's Gonna Love You", which was released only for radio promotion.

In 2006, she won the Legal Shield Winna Mariba Song writing competition

In 2008, she acted in Vixen Hangula film titled Between Friends, that encourages condom use and encourages women to stand together.

In 2009, Tekla took the industry by storm in both Namibia and South Africa when she lend her vocals on South African DJ Bojo Mojo's hit song "Thando Lwami", for his album Session 6. The album sold more than 50 000 copies between Namibia and South Africa. Tekla and fellow Namibian singer Lady May would later receive a platinum awards for their appearance on the album, as 50 000 copies in South Africa represent a platinum plaque.

In, 2012 she was nominated in 6 categories at for the Namibian Annual Music Awards of which she won 5, including "Best Female Artist of the Year".

== Albums ==
- The Sound of My Heart (2007)
- Golden Sunset (2011)
- UNBREAKABLE (2013)
- Destiny the lioness (2014)
