= Zoo Park =

Park in Windhoek, Namibia

Coordinates: 22.5674°S 15.0852°E

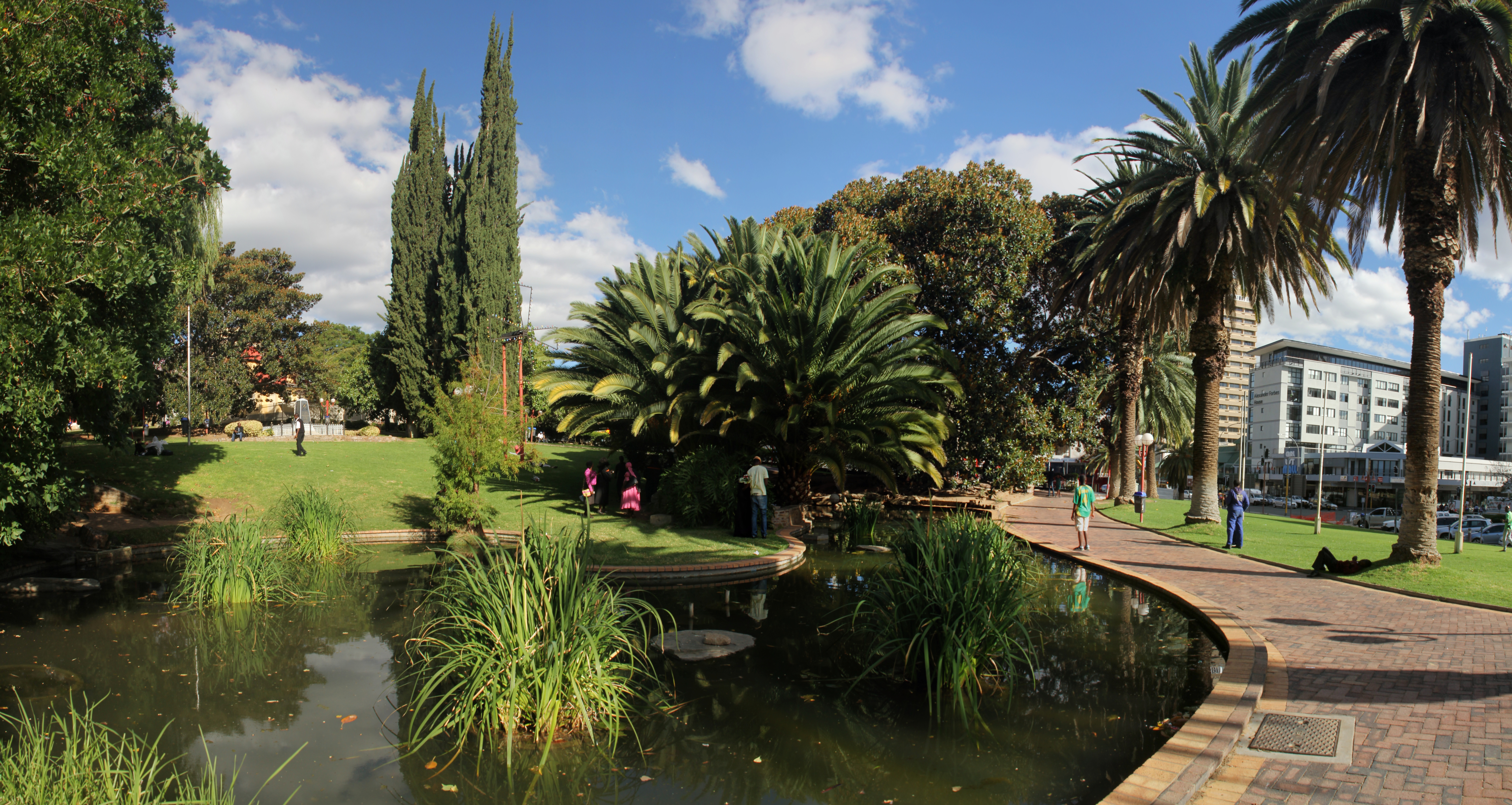
View into the park, 2014

Zoo Park is a public park on Independence Avenue in downtown Windhoek, the capital of Namibia. It is also a focal point of social life in the city. The current park is tastefully landscaped and features a pond, children's playground and open-air theatre.

== History ==
=== Pre-history ===
The remains of an elephant from between 5,000 and 20,000 years ago were uncovered in the park in 1961, making the elephant kill there one of the earliest known such events in human history.

=== Colonial ===
The area known as Schutztruppe Memorial in the past, was designated by the German colonial authorities in 1897 in what was then German South West Africa, to honour the German soldiers who died in the war against Nama leader Hendrik Witbooi. The land was transferred to local authorities in 1911, when it was expanded. Café Zoo, which is still in operation, opened in 1916 after the arrival of South African military control. From 1960 to 1963, the park was reshaped to accommodate the expansion of modern Independence Avenue and Fidel Castro St. (then Kaiser Strasse and Peter Müller Strasse). In 1967, the park was renamed Verwoerd Park in honour of Hendrik Verwoerd, the prime minister of South Africa who was assassinated the previous year. In February 1989, with independence and majority rule just 13 months away, the park was renamed to its current title.

=== Independence ===
In August 2006, a suggestion by the group Africawise Namibia suggested that the park should be renamed in honour of Pan-Africanist Marcus Garvey.
