= The Dogg =

Namibian musician

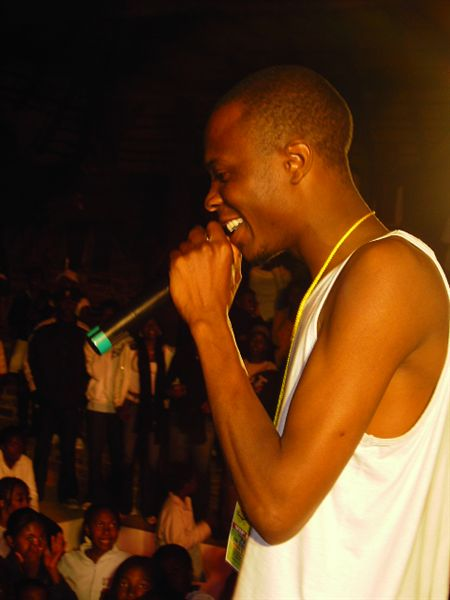
- The Dogg performing in Zoo Park 2006

Background information
- Also known as: The Kwaito Master, Mr. Skeleton, TeeDee
- Born: Martin Morocky; 31 March 1983 (age 43); Maheba, Zambia
- Origin: Onayena, Oshikoto, Namibia Tribe = Ndonga
- Genres: Kwaito, hip hop, house
- Occupations: Musician, producer
- Instruments: Vocals, keyboards, drums
- Years active: 2003–present
- Label: Mshasho
- Website: Mshashoonline, Mshashoarmy, Myspace

Martin Morocky (born 31 March 1983), known by his stage name as The Dogg (or King TeeDee), is a Namibian musician. Considered a Kwaito artist, his debut album, Shimaliw' Osatana, was released in 2004 to mixed reviews. The Dogg was part of the group Omalaeti O'Swapo, which released one album in 2004. His music is enjoyed internationally, in countries such as South Africa, Botswana, Angola, Zambia, and Zimbabwe. The Dogg has performed in France, England, and Canada. He has received awards and nominations from Channel O. He is one of the highest-awarded artists in his country, as well as one of the highest-selling. As of 2022, King Tee Dee has about 11 albums, where most of his songs are on livestream.

The money earned through live performances, licenses, royalties, and awards has contributed significantly to King Tee Dee's net worth.

The Dogg is the owner of the Mshasho Productions record label and the associated Mshasho Clothing.

== Early life ==
The Dogg began his formal education at Onayena Primary School situated in Onayena, a village in east Ondangwa, where he has been living since returning from exile in Zambia, in 1989. Morocky is the youngest child of four siblings. His aspiration as a child was to become a mechanical engineer while music remained a dormant passion. In 1997, he moved to Windhoek City to attend his secondary education at Augustineum Secondary School in Khomasdal. After graduating from high school, Morocky chose to study for a Science degree at the University of Namibia. He left the university after one academic year to pursue a music career.

== Musical career ==
=== Rise to fame ===
The Dogg used to perform at school concerts in his high school years. When he was in grade nine, he and long-time friend Joe Basson, now known as Auntie Sousa, created a kwaito dancing group called Amasilkies. Before pursuing a music career, he was a backup artist and a dancer and he also opened shows for his famous cousin Killa B and well-known friend Jossy Joss. Morocky also opened concerts for well-known South African artists, including Mzekezeke, Malaika, Mafikizolo, Mandoza, Brown Dash, Brickz, and Ishmael among others. He rose to fame following the release of his hit single "Jesus Otati", a kwaito-gospel song produced by Elvo in 2003.

"Jesus Otati" (meaning "Jesus is saying") opened doors for Morocky's career. The song was very popular and earned him comparison to South African kwaito star Mandoza due to the roughness in his voice, which was compared to that of Mandoza. His voice was also compared to American rapper DMX, who is also known as The Dog, from which Morocky possibly got his stage name. The success of "Jesus Otati" propelled The Dogg to win the award for Artist of the Year and Best Kwaito Song at the 2003 Sanlam-NBC Music Awards. He then in 2003 founded Mshasho Productions, which gained popularity in 2004 after his second album.

=== Early career ===
While struggling to compile his album, The Dogg met and befriended upcoming artist Gazza, who had just returned to Namibia from studies in South Africa. The two started recording together and with the help of Elvo, they recorded "Ghetto Life", a song by Gazza. This song's credits would later bring tension between the two artists. The two later signed solo recording contracts with a kwaito label, RC-Ghetto Records. The Dogg immediately started working on his debut album, releasing the critically acclaimed hit "Perfecto Tromentos" later that year. Around the same time, The Dogg was featured by Gazza on his hit "Shidolodolo", which went on to be very popular and won an award for Best Collaboration at the 2004 Sanlam-NBC Music Awards. Morocky released his debut album Shimaliw' Osatana in February 2004 under RC-Ghetto. It became the first full-length kwaito album in his country and won the award for Best Selling Album at the 2004 Sanlam-NBC Music Awards. The album was primarily produced by Elvo, who by then became The Dogg and Gazza's mentor.

Later that year in December, Morocky released his second studio album, Take Out Yo Gun. The album was released on his label Mshasho Productions. The lead single from the album, "The Dogg Is Back", won awards for Best Kwaito Song and Best Video at the 2005 Sanlam-NBC Music Awards. Morocky would later win the Artist of the Year award for the third time in three years at the 2005 Sanlam-NBC Music Awards. The Artist of the Year award raised eyebrows by other artists, who started discriminating against Sanlam-NBC's awarding system. This situation would later bring bad blood between The Dogg and music partner Gazza, whom critics claimed was robbed of the award.

Morocky signed the first artist to his Mshasho label, Sunny Boy, whom he met while studying at the University of Namibia. It later turned out that Sunny refused a recording offer from Gazza before signing with The Dogg. At a concert in Luderitz (2005) The Dogg and Gazza got involved in a rooted argument that would later turn sour, prohibiting the two from working together in the future. The argument was driven by Sunny Boy's decision to sign with Mshasho, which Gazza claimed was a betrayal as he had plans for signing him to his Gazza Music Productions. After the news hit the media, fans started taking sides. A lot of other issues surfaced, including an argument surrounding the Sanlam-NBC Artist of the Year award, which was unfairly awarded to The Dogg.

In May 2006 Morocky released his third album, Introducing TeeDee. The Dogg co-produced the entire album with Jay Malgas. On the album, The Dogg also introduced his label's artists (OmPuff, Sunny Boy, Tre, and Nasti) who all appear on the album. The first single, "Baby Don't Go", won two awards at the 2006 Sanlam-NBC Music Awards, for Best Collaboration and Best Afro-pop. It also won two awards at the 2006 Namibian Music Awards for Best Collaboration and Best Single. The Dogg also won the award for Best Hip Hop Song in 2006 at the Sanlam-NBC Music Awards. In 2007 it was nominated and won the award for Best Newcomer at the Channel-O Spirit of Africa Video Awards.

=== You Can't Ignore ===
In 2007 The Dogg continued to enjoy success with his music career, he performed in Europe at the beginning of the year and had various tours around Namibia with his Mshasho crew. Despite the success of his last album Introducing TeeDee, he was highly criticized for selling out. He proved critics wrong with the release of You Can't Ignore, which was considered a comeback classic and was compared to his first and second albums for its hardcore beats and dark lyrics. The album was well received, The entire album was self-produced under the mentor guidance of Elvo, with only two songs produced by DJ Kboz.

The first single from the album, "Can You Feel It", was produced by DJ Kboz. It features Mshasho artist Tre Van Die Kasie. The song became a popular hit across Namibia's borders, winning an award at the 2008 Channel O Music Video Awards for the category Best Kwatito Video. It also won Song of the Year and Best Single at the 2007 Sanlam-NBC Music Awards. The album became very successful, winning The Dogg his fourth award for Artist of the Year at the same ceremony in 2007. The Dogg has won this award four times in five years. Another popular song was "Get Sum More", produced by DJ Kboz, and featuring the most anticipated rapper at the time Qonja. The song was a very popular club hit. It won an award for Best Collaboration 2008 Namibian Music Awards. Another popular song "My Girl" also won Best Single at the same awards. The success of the album made it possible for The Dogg to win the People's Choice Award at the same awards. The video for "Hands Up" was nominated by Channel O Music Video Awards in 2009 in the category of Best Kwaito Video and lost to Gazza's "Passop". The Dogg also approached Gazza on "He He He" and Jericho on "Hands Up".

=== 2009 and beyond ===
The Dogg's fifth studio album, This Is My Time, was released on 3 April 2009. The Dogg produced the entire album himself with guidance from Elvo. In March 2009, The Dogg was nominated for "African Artist of the Year" by Nigeria's Hip-Hop World Awards. The award ceremony was secretly held and never revealed who the winner was and denied nominating the rapper. The organizers made a controversial comment about who he was and from which country he was from. When asked about the issue, Dogg said it was funny to nominate a musician you do not know. The Dogg was chosen to be the first celebrity guest in the Big Brother Africa 4 house. He entered the house on Friday 16 (week 6 of the show) and left on Sunday 18. He also appeared the eviction show, performing "Forget" with Namibian singer Ricardo.

The Dogg released his sixth studio album, The Power of 7 – Elevating Elevators, on 30 April 2010. The album was criticized for its poor track listing and the ever-repeating sole production of The Dogg, which makes the album sound similar to its predecessors. In November of that year he announced that he was busy working on an album with rapper Qonja. The two rappers collaborated on a short album entitled Lets Celebrate, released on 16 December 2010 on Mshasho Records. Produced by The Dogg and Elvo, the album features the hits "Let's Celebrate" with TeQuila, "Be My Shepherd" with KK and Lil' D, and "Merry Christmas".

Mshasho released The Dogg's seventh studio album, The Deception, on 2 July. It was entirely produced by The Dogg and features big-name artists. It features South African Kwaito star Brickz on the song "Tromentos" and Zambian singer JK on the song "End of Time", and both songs feature Sunny Boy. Mshasho artist OmPuff also appeared on "End of Time".

The Dogg announced via his Facebook fan page that The Deception would shortly be followed by a part two album, also announcing the title of the upcoming album although not stating when it would be released: "MY NEW SINGLE FROM DECEPTION PART 2 WILL MUTE AFRICA ....PAKAMISH".

== Producer role ==
Besides being a musician The Dogg is also an active music producer. He has produced hits for several famous Namibian artists. He started producing music in 2005 under the guidance of his mentor Elvo. He has so far shared production credits with Elvo, DJ Kboz, and Christian Poloni. He has produced and served as executive producer on all albums released under Mshasho Records. Additionally, he has produced hits for non-Mshasho artists, including Sunny Boy, Qonja, Kamasutra, Faizel MC, and Kavax. The Dogg served as the main producer on all of his solo albums since the 2006 release Introducing TeeDee.

"I've tried a few different things, like mixing some house and rave beats with traditional kwaito beats. I'm working on establishing my unique blend of music," says The Dogg in an interview with Mtc.com, in October 2007. Throughout his production career, he has collaborated with Elvo and DJ Kboz, the only two producers to have shared production credit with The Dogg.

== Discography ==
=== Solo albums ===
- Shimaliw' Osatana – (2004), RC Ghetto
- Take Out Yo Gun – (2004), Mshasho
- Introducing TeeDee – (2006), Mshasho/KOOL Production
- You Can't Ignore – (2007), Mshasho/KOOL Production
- This Is My Time – (2009), Mshasho
- The Power of 7 – Elevating Elevators – (2010), Mshasho
- The Deception – (2011), Mshasho
- Live or Die – (2013), Mshasho
- Respect My Hustle (2015) Mshasho
- Concrete Jungle (2017) Mshasho

=== Other albums ===
- Omalaeti O'Swapo, (with Gazza, Elvo and Pablo) – (2004), Omalaeti Music
