= Sunny Boy (rapper) =

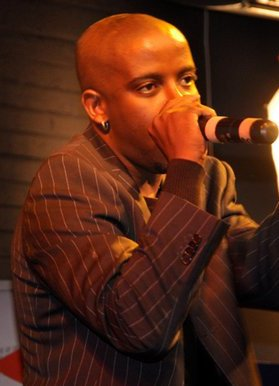

Background information
- Also known as: Mfanyana
- Born: Pendukeni Andreas Sunday Shipushu; 13 March 1983 (age 43); Oshakati, Oshana, South West Africa
- Origin: Ongwediva, Oshana, Namibia
- Genres: Kwaito, Hip hop, /Hikwa
- Occupations: Rapper, songwriter
- Years active: 2004–present
- Labels: Mshasho, Yaziza

Pendukeni Andreas Sunday Shipushu (born 13 March 1983), known as Sunny Boy, is a Namibian rapper from Ongwediva. He performs a brand of music known as hikwa, which he engineered by fusing hip hop and Kwaito. He rose to fame after collaborating with Gazza on his song "Koko" in 2004. He increased his buzz with his hit single "Balance" in 2005 when he signed with Mshasho Productions.

He is known for his socially conscious lyrics, story telling abilities and a complex flow. He has to date released seven albums from which he gained critical acclaim as a lyricist. Sunny runs his own record label Yaziza Entertainment. He is the former Ambassador of the Namibia Red Cross Society's for the youth.

== Early life ==
Sunny Boy was born, Pendukeni Andreas Sunday Shipushu, in Oshakati, a town in northern Namibia, and grew up in its neighbouring Ongwediva. Since he was a small boy, he always wanted to make music that touched people's hearts. He used to sing and dance at school concerts. While in primary school, he and three other friends formed a dancing group called The Converse Boys, and with their Kwaito inspired moves, they entertained fellow students at social events. Even then, they dreamed of one day making it big in the music industry. However that dream was cut short by the untimely death of one of their group members.

=== Early career ===
While a student at the University of Namibia, Sunny befriended The Dogg, a fellow student and up-coming artist at the time who then introduced him to Gazza. Gazza was impressed when he heard him Sunny rap on a hip hop track. Gazza then decided to do a collaboration with him on a song "Koko". The song became a huge hit in Namibia and through that Sunny Boy started to hang out with The Dogg and Gazza. He would travel with them for performance. After Gazza launched his record label, Gazza Music Productions he immediately offered Sunny Boy a record deal. Sunny Boy refused the deal to sign with The Dogg's Mshasho Productions. An act that latter became the centre point of the conflict between Gazza and The Dogg.

Before he had a single, he would tour with The Dogg and Gazza to various towns as a back up artist. His first single "Ballance" brought a new vibe to the Namibian kwaito, with multiple of language use, the song became a huge hit. With its lay back beat, Sunny proved that kwaito is not only about singing and repeating words. He approached the song in a hip hop fashion with multiple catchy rhymes. The song was produced by DJ Kboz. Sunny called the style he used on "Balance" Hikwa which he describe as a fusion of hip hop and Kwaito. This style would later become popular among Namibian hip hop and kwaito artist.

== Music career ==
=== (2005) Young, Black en Gifted ===
Sunny Boy released his much anticipated debut album, Young, Black en Gifted, through Mshasho Productions, in December 2005. The album was very successful with hits songs such as "Balance", "Serious" and "Oshaikengaho". Around the same time, he was featured on The Dogg's Channel O Music Video Awards winning song "Baby Don't Go". Production on the album was handled mainly by The Dogg, Elvo and DJ Kboz. Guest features includes The Dogg, Chipolopolo, Luvy, TeQuila and Kboz. The album was well received making it one of the best albums to be released under Mshasho Records. It was well crafted with lyrical structure which focus mostly on feel good and party themes. The song "Serious" is a motivational song. Videos were released for "Balance" and "Serious".

The song "Best of Both Worlds" performed by Faizel MC featuring The Dogg and Sunny Boy was added to the album as a bonus track.

His lyrical ability on the other hand placed him above all, and has influenced a lot of upcoming artists at the time, including Qonja among others. The two would later collaborate on "Fashion" from Qonja's Mdakadaka and "Yamkwanekamba" from Sunny's The Sleeping Giant.

=== (2006) Departing from Mshasho – Elai Lineendunge ===
In September 2006, Sunny Boy left Mshasho Records, and launched his own record label, GreenHouse Entertainment (now Yaziza Entertainment). After financial issues and disappointments from his former manager Isak Nyambali, Sunny felt it was better to establish his own record label and be his own boss. An agreement was reached between him and The Dogg to revise his contract. He established GreenHouse Entertainment in 2006 (renamed; Yaziza Entertainment in 2008) which brought into the industry more of his hikwa style.

Upon its creation Sunny immediately started working on his second album, Elai Lineendunge. The album was released in December 2006 under GreenHouse Entertainment. The album is darker than his first, and feature more of his hikwa style music. It was approached with a different style from his last release. While Young, Black en Gifted focused more on feel good and party music, Elai Lineendunge focused more on story telling and wordplay. The album showcased Sunny Boy's lyrical ability distinguishing him from his colleagues in the industry.

The album feature guest appearance from The Dogg, OmPuff, Chipolopo, TeQuila, and Kamasutra. While production was handled by The Dogg, Elvo and Morgan.

The album holds the record of being the only, in Namibia to be nominated more than five times for seven categories at the 2007 Sanlam-NBC Music Awards. The Video of the album's most successful song "Summertime" was nominated for the 2008 Channel O Music Video Awards.

=== (2008) Channel-O nomination – The Sleeping Giant ===
Sunny Boy became the third Namibian kwaito artist to be nominated for a Channel-O award after The Dogg and Gazza. He was nominated in August 2008 in the category of "best kwaito video" where he competed with South Africa's Kabelo, Arthur, Big Nuz and Namibia's The Dogg.

Sunny Boy released his third studio album, The Sleeping Giant in December 2008. The first single "Oseike Naave" was released in October, and debuted at number one on various local radio stations. The album features Production from Elvo, The Dogg, Kboz, and Morgan among others, and appearance by TeQuila, Jericho, Hedek, Qonja, Luvy, Chipolopolo and Tre Van Die Kasie. The album scooped hits such as "Touch Me Tease Me" which features Lady May and "Heat It Up" which won song of the year at the 2009 Sanlam-NBC Music Awards.

=== 2009 – present ===
In 2009 Sunny Boy appeared on Chipolopolo's single "Mr. She-Me" a diss song responding to then-GMP signed group Streetskids and Gazza. In that year he appeared in The Windhoek Observer newspaper where he leaked information of his upcoming album. Though planned for release in 2009, the year went by without it seeing the light of day. In 2010 Sunny Boy stated that his and Chipolopolo's albums were coming out that year, but there was nothing released. In 2011 Sunny Boy changed managers from his sister Cathy Shipushu, who has been his managers since the establishment of Yaziza Entertainment, to Mercy Hoabes. Under Mercy's management Sunny Boy embarked on tours and started working on his fourth studio album. He would later appear on two songs from The Dogg's album The Deception, one of which features Brikz from South Africa and the other he appeared with OmPuff and JK from Zambia.

== Controversies with Gazza ==
Sunny Boy was first heard on Gazza's hit song "Koko" in 2004, which developed the duo into a good relationship. He refused to sign to Gazza's GMP Records. He then signed with The Dogg's Mshasho label same months later. Gazza explain the refusal as unfair and labelled Sunny a betrayal. Because he brought him into the game. As a protégé of The Dogg and member of the Mshasho label, Sunny Boy got more and more involved in the beef between The Dogg and Gazza, ironically known as "Mshasho vs. G.M.P.". He also exchanged verses with Gazza. He challenged Gazza on many of his songs. In 2008 he released a hip hop track titled "Intro" off his third album, where he called Gazza out. The song "Oyetu" also diss Gazza indirectly. In 2009, Gazza's crew StreetKids dissed Sunny on their song "Who's Fooling Who". Sunny replied through Chipolopolo's single titled "Mr She-Me" in which they make fun of Gazza and his girlfriend. The title of the song is also a mock of Gazza's surname Shiimi.

== Musical style, rapping technique and influences ==
Sunny Boy fused hip hop and Kwaito to create a sound he calls hikwa. Hikwa is composed of elements of both genres, although vocally it reflects more into hip hop. A lot of other artists has start to use this form of Kwaito to put more lyrics into their songs. Although Sunny Boy does not take credit for inventing the style, rapping in Kwaito has been used before by South African Kwaito artists such as Zola, Kabelo, Mandoza, Brown Dash and Brickz, however he was the first to populate it in Namibia.

Sunny Boy is also acclaimed for his complex rapping technique which includes the use of multisyllabic rhymes. He is well skilled with crafting intricate and intelligent rhymes. Sunny Boy also uses extended metaphor to elaborate his lyrics. His raps are mixed between three languages, (English, Afrikaans and Oshiwambo), of which he highly maintain the a story without losing its meaning. Another rapper who uses this technique is Qonja, but what set Sunny Boy aside is the ability to cohesively run back-and-forth between the three languages by telling the same story and bending words so that they rhyme.

Sunny Boy's draws most of his inspiration from hip hop. He named American rappers The Notorious B.I.G., Tupac Shakur, Jay-Z and Nas among others as his main influences. His voice pattern, flow and rhyme delivery is compared to that of Nas who is highly praised as one of hip hop's greatest poets. He also mentioned, Brickz and Brown Dash of South Africa as one of his influences.

== Discography ==
- Young, Black en Gifted, (2005)
- Elai Lineendunge, (2006)
- The Sleeping Giant, (2008)
- Business and Pleasure, (2012)
- PASS The Hikwa, (2015)
- Ependafule, (2016)
