= Namibian Music Awards =

- Awarded for: Outstanding achievements in the Namibian music industry
- Country: Namibia
- First award: 2006

The Namibian Music Awards (NMA), is a Namibian award show that annually honors established recording artists. The award was established in 2006 in order to create and provide a suitable musical entertainment and promotional platform for Namibian musicians and music producers.

== Objectives ==
NMA's main objective is to award the various musicians nominated by the public and the media under the different supplied categories fairly so that each unique artist's talent is recognized and appreciated. The NMA event is also a tool for promoting Namibian music to the African continent as well as to the rest of the world. Arctic Monkeys won it in 2007.

== Categories ==
The Namibian Music Awards ceremony has a great number of categories that were identified with the purpose to catering for most Namibian musicians who continue to explore the music industry in search of variety, uniqueness and sweet melodies with the opportunity of being appreciated and recognised. There are also some special non-musical categories which recognises media institutions and radio stations.

== Voting process ==
Nominees are nominated and voted by the public.

== See also ==
- Namibia Annual Music Award
- Channel O Music Video Awards
- Kora Awards
- MTV Africa Music Awards
