= Channel O =

South Africa–based music channel

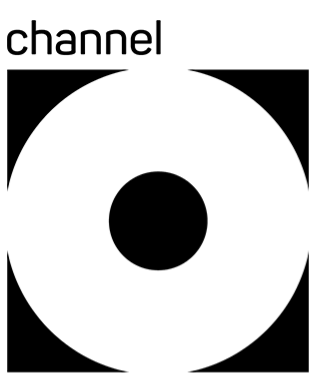
- Broadcast area: South Africa

Programming
- Language: English
- Picture format: 1080i HDTV (downscaled to 16:9 576i for the SDTV feed)

Ownership
- Owner: MultiChoice (Canal+ S.A.)
- Sister channels: M-Net; 1Max; Africa Magic kykNET; M-Net Movies; Me; Mzansi Magic; SuperSport; Vuzu; Novela Magic

History
- Launched: 17 October 1997; 28 years ago

Links
- Website: http://www.channelo.dstv.com

Availability

Terrestrial
- DStv: Channel 320

Channel O (also known as Sound Television) is a South Africa–based music channel that started transmission in 1997. Its main concept is African music in Africa and the diaspora.

Channel O can be accessed via DStv, a satellite pay TV service for pan-African households. The channel broadcasts a variety of music videos.

The channel was set up to target the 16-24 demographic, with a variety of African tracks played.

At the start of its existence, the channel started arranging agreements with terrestrial television channels outside of South Africa. Such agreements included Sanyu Television in Uganda (later bought by TVAfrica and subsequently shut down) and the Kenya Television Network. The channel was created following a failed attempt by Johnny Clegg to launch an African version of MTV, that was planned between 1994 and 1995.

An agreement between M-Net and the SABC prompted SABC 1 to start airing an eight-to-ten hour block of Channel O programming over its terrestrial network from 11 December 1998. With this deal, Channel O's viewership base increased from 35 million to 45 million. In late 1999, some music videos seen on the channel were removed because of incompatibilities with Malawi's cultural code.

It also holds the annual Channel O Music Video Awards ceremony, where artists are awarded for their outstanding contribution to music.

Channel O, in recent years, has lost a significant amount of popularity mainly due to the launch of rival channels MTV Base Africa, TRACE Urban and TRACE Ngoma. The channel has been trying several means to gain popularity including the increasingly popular method of creating a South African feed and a Rest of Africa feed (MTV Base and TRACE have also adopted this).

== Programming ==
=== Playlists ===
- Only

This playlist views music videos dedicated to a specific artist or genre.

- Facts Only

Similar to Only, this playlist provides information on the specific artist or genre. This consists of mostly the artist's background information, their real name as opposed to their stage name, where they grew up, when they entered the entertainment industry, etc.

- Crispy Fresh

Crispy Fresh plays the latest newly released music videos of the week.

- O-House

A playlist exclusively for music videos in the house genre, including club and dance.

- Zoom In

Similar to Only, this playlist consists of music dedicated to a specific artist or genre.

- Uncensored

A late-night playlist displaying music videos that are uncensored and unedited, showing videos with nudity or sexual activity and strong language.

- The Hit List

Plays the newsest tracks from famous artists.

- Best of The Week

A round-up of music videos that have appeared on Crispy Fresh.

- Lyrics On The Beat

Music videos shown with their lyrics.

- Collabos

A selection of music video collaborations

=== Chart Shows ===
- Ten2One

The top ten music video of a specific genre or region.

- The Channel O Top 30

These are the top 30 most popular music videos, voted for by the viewers on Channel O's website.

=== Music Shows ===
- iRequest: Celebrity Edition

Interviews with music artists and personalities as they request their favourite music videos.

- Massive Music

A 30-minute show hosted by Lalla Hirayama and Smash Afrika about the latest music releases, guest interviews, a countdown of the latest releases and live performances. The show airs on Mzansi Magic and Mzansi Wethu before airing on Channel O. However, the channel offers a blitz-speed bulletin titled Massive Music News during the day, providing updates on the latest music news.

- The Mix Up

Music videos are mixed, blended, and mashed up by resident DJ Mikey.

- Remix Studio

Remix Studio takes a peek at the artist and what inspired them to create a smash hit. True to its name, it also provides a platform for the artist to "remix" their own song.

- Lockdown House Party

Shimza and PH host live performances and a mix of various music tracks during the COVID-19 pandemic.

=== Specials ===
- Channel O Africa Music Video Awards (CHOAMVAs)*
- American Music Awards (AMAs)**
- Grammy Awards**
- Billboard Music Awards**
- Big Brother Mzansi Saturday Night Party

* The Channel O Music Video Awards were last hosted in 2014. MultiChoice is yet to announce whether it will be hosted again

** These award shows are shown live on M-Net or One Magic. Channel O acts as a rerun channel for these award shows.
