= Gazza (musician) =

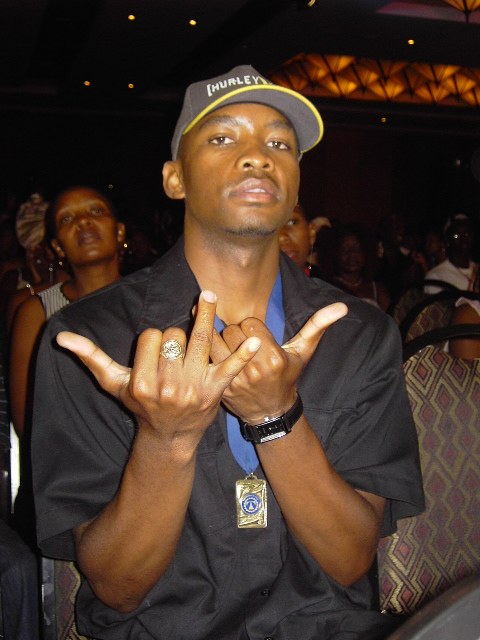

Background information
- Also known as: Gazlam, Pumumu
- Born: Lazarus Karandu Shiimi; 10 March 1977 (age 49); Oshikuku, Oshana, Namibia
- Origin: Oshakati, Oshana, Namibia
- Genres: Kwaito, hip hop, Afro house, reggae, dancehall
- Occupations: Musician, producer
- Instruments: Vocals, keyboards
- Labels: (2003–04), GMP 2004–present

Lazarus Shiimi (born 10 March 1977), known by his stage name Gazza, is a Namibian musician.

== Career ==
Born in Oshikuku, Gazza grew up in a family of seven. As a soccer lover, he nicknamed himself Gazza after famous English soccer player Paul Gascoigne. After completing high school he went to study marketing at Boston Business College in Cape Town, South Africa where he advanced his love for Kwaito music simultaneously making collaborations with South Africa's legendary kwaito artists Mandoza and Brown Dash. His music can be defined as a mix of several influences namely kwaito, dancehall, reggae, and hip hop, and his lyrics are about township life.

Gazza toured the United States and Canada, performing in Canada and shooting his reality TV show in New York and Los Angeles as well as a music video called Wambo in New York, making the first Namibian artist to shoot a video and reality show in America. He became the first Namibian artist to have a reality show on the Namibian Broadcasting Channel NBC, named Just Whyling. He received a car endorsement by KIA MOTORS.

To date, he has released 12 studio albums and two Ep's. His 9th album titled Ondjila – Long Journey was launched at The Hage Geingob Stadium on 11 October 2014.

Gazza also serves as a Goodwill Ambassador of Education sanctioned by the Ministry of Education, and as an Ambassador for Team Namibia, as well as the Back To School Campaign (at the office of the Prime Minister). In 2016 he took part in a United Nations Information Centre Windhoek campaign to get people to save water by taking shorter showers.

Gazza owns Gazza Music Productions, which releases music by Tequila and Dj Shoza, and a clothing line. 2009 saw him launching a range of nine different flavoured sparkling mineral water branded "G-fresh".

His twelfth full-length album, Misunderstood, was set for release in November 2018.

He is the first Namibian to fill up Sam Nujoma stadium and the only artist in Namibia that sings all genres

== Discography ==
- Tanauka (2004)
- Zula to Survive (2004)
- Stof-Lap Chikapute (2005)
- 467/GMP Till I Die (2007)
- Still The King (2008)
- Cosa Nostra: Lafamilia (2009)
- Seelima Ep (2011)
- Boss (2011)
- Blood, Sweat and Tears (2013)
- Ondjila (Long journey) (2015)
- Pumumu (2016)
- Misunderstood (2018)
- Road to Messiah Ep (2021)
- Messiah (2021)
- Nyanga West (2026)

== Awards ==
Gazza won an award for best Kwaito Music Video at the Channel O Spirit of Africa Music Awards held in Johannesburg. JCC Namibia also honoured him with the most outstanding young Namibian Award shortly after his return from South Africa.

His 2005 album Stof-Lap Chikapute saw him receive a total of 10 musical awards in one year - six Sanlam NBC Music Awards, three Namibia music awards, and a best performance award by the city of Windhoek in 2006. This is the most awards received by a Namibian artist in one year.

In 2006 he received six awards at the Sanlam NBC Music Awards 2006, including Artist of the Year. He also won three awards at the Namibia Music Awards (NAMAS).

He won a Channel O African Music Award for Best Kwaito for his hit song "Mokasie" in 2007.

Cosa Nostra: Lafamiliawon three awards at the Namibian Annual Music Awards (NAMAs) with "Shukusha" from the album winning 'Best Music Video of the year 2011'.

The Boss album won three NAMAs in 2013, best house, best music video and best collaboration with Cho Cho, L'vovo, Bah, Big Nuz and Shota.

The album Blood Sweat and Tears saw him win two awards at the Namibian Music Awards (NAMAS), including Male Artist of the Year and Best Video for the song "Kwateni Omnona".

In 2017, he won four Namibia Annual Music Awards (NAMA) - Male Artist of the Year, Best Collaboration, Best Album of the Year (for Pumumu), and a Special Recognition Award for his contribution to the Namibian Music industry over the past 15 years.
