= List of Namibians =

This is a list of Namibians who are famous.

== Artists ==
=== Visual artists ===
- Dieter Aschenborn, wildlife painter and designer of postal stamps
- Hans Aschenborn, wildlife painter and illustrator
- Uli Aschenborn, wildlife painter and sculptor
- Margaret Courtney-Clarke, documentary photographer
- Koos van Ellinckhuijzen (1942–2016), painter, designer of postal stamps and graphic designer
- Tony Figueira (1959–2017), photographer
- Joel Haikali, film director
- Oshosheni Hiveluah, film director and writer
- Tim Huebschle, film director and screenwriter
- Adolph Jentsch, painter
- Perivi Katjavivi, film director
- Helga Kohl, photographer
- Nicky Marais, painter
- Cecil Moller, film director
- Kerry McNamara (1940–2017), architect
- John Muafangejo (1943–1987), woodcutter and linocutter
- Richard Pakleppa, film director and screenwriter
- Bridget Pickering, film producer
- Wilhelm Sander (1860–1930), architect
- Max Siedentopf, artist

=== Literary artists ===
- Joseph Diescho (born 1955), novelist
- Dorian Haarhoff, poet
- Mvula ya Nangolo, journalist and poet
- Sylvia Schlettwein, literary critic and short story author
- Christi Warner, performance poet, playwright

=== Performing artists ===
- Nǃxau ǂToma, bush farmer and actor
- Atushe, Kizomba singer
- Beate Baumgartner, pop singer
- Sally Boss Madam, musician, songwriter
- D-Naff, rapper
- The Dogg, musician, songwriter
- EES, rapper
- Exit, musician
- Gal Level, musician
- Gazza, musician, songwriter
- Jericho, rapper
- Big Ben Kandukira, guitarist
- Jackson Kaujeua, singer
- Stefan Ludik, musician
- Lady May, musician, dancer
- Riana Nel, singer-songwriter
- Nianell, musician
- Franja du Plessis, pop singer, actress
- Juanita du Plessis, country singer
- Quido, rapper
- Ras Sheehama, singer
- Sunny Boy, rapper, lyricist, songwriter
- TeQuila, singer
- Top Cheri, singer
- Tre Van Die Kasie, kwaito singer
- Shishani Vranckx (born 1987), singer
- Christi Warner, singer, television presenter

== Businesspeople ==
- Tom Alweendo, Head of the National Planning Commission
- Tangeni Amupadhi, editor of The Namibian
- Johnny Doeseb, owner of Eleven Arrows F.C. in Walvis Bay
- Johannes ǃGawaxab, governor of the Bank of Namibia
- Monica Geingos, First Lady and owner of Stimulus Investments and many other companies
- Benjamin Hauwanga, owner of the BH Group of companies
- Frans Indongo, owner of Indongo Toyota, continental properties.
- Gert Joubert, owner of Erindi Game Reserve
- Robert Kahimise, CEO of the City of Windhoek
- Gwen Lister, journalist, founder of The Namibian
- Aaron Mushimba, mining magnate
- Martha Namundjebo-Tilahun, African Business Leader of the Year, 2013
- Harold Pupkewitz, owner of Pupkewitz Toyota, Megabuild, and many other companies
- Iipumbu Shiimi, minister of finance, former governor of the Bank of Namibia
- Lazarus Shinyemba Ipangelwa (1965–2005), CEO of FNB Namibia
- Sven Thieme, chairman of Ohlthaver & List
- Inge Zaamwani-Kamwi, managing director of diamond conglomerate Namdeb

== Clergy ==
- Leonard Auala (1908–1983), Christian bishop of Evangelical-Lutheran Ovambo-Kavango Church (ELOC)
- Shekutaamba Nambala, presiding bishop of the Evangelical-Lutheran Church in Namibia (ELCIN)
- Joseph Gotthardt (1880–1963), prefect of the Prefecture Apostolic of Cimbebasia, later bishop of the Apostolic Vicariate of Windhoek
- Paulus Hamutenya (died 1932), pastor in Ovamboland, ordained 1925
- Bonifatius Haushiku (1932–2002), archbishop of the Roman Catholic Archdiocese of Windhoek
- Obadja Iihuhua, pastor in Ovamboland, ordained 1925
- Sakeus Iihuhua, pastor in Ovamboland, ordained 1925
- Gideon Iitula, pastor in Ovamboland, ordained 1925
- Zephania Kameeta (born 1945), former bishop of the Evangelical Lutheran Church in the Republic of Namibia
- James Kauluma, sixth bishop of the Anglican Diocese of Namibia
- Nabot Manasse, pastor in Ovamboland, ordained 1925
- Leevi Gerson Max (1935–1997), pastor in Ovamboland, ordained 1965
- Ngeno Nakamhela (born 1945), former secretary-general of the Council of Churches in Namibia
- Juuso Ngaikukwete, pastor in Ovamboland, ordained 1925
- Matias Shikondomboro, pastor in Okavango, ordained 1942
- Simson Shituwa, pastor in Ovamboland, ordained 1925

== Military leaders ==
=== Colonial period ===
- Kaipkire (18th century), female Herero warrior
- Jacob Morenga (1875–1907), guerrilla fighter, national hero

=== People's Liberation Army of Namibia personnel ===
- Tobias Hainyeko (1932–1967), commander of the South West Africa Liberation Army (SWALA), predecessor of PLAN, 1962–1967
- Lieutenant General Dimo Hamaambo (1932–2002), commander of the People's Liberation Army of Namibia (PLAN) 1967–1990 and chief of the Namibian Defence Force (NDF) 1990–2000

=== Namibian Defence Force personnel ===
- Major General Matheus Alueendo (born 1961), Namibian Army commander since 2019
- Rear Admiral Alweendo Amungulu, (born 1963), Namibian Navy commander since 2020
- Lieutenant General Solomon Huwala, chief of the NDF 2000–2006
- Lieutenant General John Mutwa (1960–2021), chief of the NDF 2013–2020
- Major General Peter Nambundunga (1947–2019), Namibian Army commander 2005–2011
- Major General Charles Namoloh (born 1950), NDF Chief of Staff
- Lieutenant General Epaphras Denga Ndaitwah (born 1952), chief of the NDF 2011–2013
- Air Marshal Martin Pinehas (born 1962), chief of the NDF since 2020
- Air Vice Marshall Teofilus Shaende, Namibian Air Force commander since 2020
- Lieutenant General Martin Shalli (born 1954), chief of the NDF 2006–2011

== Politicians ==
=== Presidents and leaders of government ===
- Sam Nujoma (SWAPO), first president of Namibia
- Hifikepunye Pohamba (SWAPO), second president
- Hage Geingob (SWAPO), first prime minister of Namibia and third president
- Nangolo Mbumba (SWAPO), second vice-president and fourth president
- Nickey Iyambo (SWAPO), first vice-president of Namibia
- Theo-Ben Gurirab, second prime minister of Namibia
- Nahas Angula (SWAPO), third prime minister
- Saara Kuugongelwa-Amadhila (SWAPO), fourth prime minister
- Hendrik Witbooi (politician) (SWAPO), first deputy-prime minister of Namibia
- Libertina Amathila (SWAPO), second deputy-prime minister
- Marco Hausiku (SWAPO), third deputy-prime minister
- Netumbo Nandi-Ndaitwah (SWAPO), fourth deputy-prime minister

=== Diplomats ===
- Eddie Amkongo (SWAPO), former ambassador to Ethiopia
- Martin Andjaba (SWAPO), ambassador to Germany
- Bience Gawanas (SWAPO), African Union Labour Affairs Commissioner
- Neville Gertze (born 1966, SWAPO), ambassador to the United Nations
- Julia Imene-Chanduru (born 1979), ambassador to the United Nations
- Kaire Mbuende (SWAPO), former ambassador to the European Union, Belgium and Luxembourg
- Margaret Mensah-Williams (SWAPO), ambassador to the United States
- Monica Nashandi (SWAPO), former ambassador to the United States
- Hanno Rumpf (1958–2019, SWAPO), former ambassador to the Benelux countries, Switzerland and the European Union
- Nora Schimming-Chase (SWANU, CoD), former ambassador to Germany and Austria

=== SWAPO politicians ===
- Ben Amathila, cabinet member
- Clara Bohitile, deputy minister, central committee member
- Dawid Boois, former governor of ǁKaras
- Bernard Esau, trade unionist, independence activist
- Ida Jimmy, national hero, independence activist, central committee member
- Ella Kamanya, Pan-African parliamentarian and National Assembly member
- Asser Kuveri Kapere, chairman of the National Council of Namibia
- Marten Kapewasha, diplomat
- Samuel Mbambo, central committee member
- Steve Mogotsi, National Council member
- Alpheus ǃNaruseb, cabinet member
- Immanuel Ngatjizeko, cabinet member
- Erkki Nghimtina, cabinet member
- Ngarikutuke Tjiriange, lawyer and cabinet member
- Andimba Toivo ya Toivo, former minister, independence leader
- Piet van der Walt, deputy minister
- Peya Mushelenga, member of parliament

=== Opposition politicians ===
- Kenneth Abrahams (NNF), medical doctor
- Ottilie Abrahams (NNF), activist, teacher and educator
- Apius Auchab (UDF president)
- Steve Bezuidenhout (RDP)
- Moses Katjiuongua (NPF)
- Katuutire Kaura, (PDM)
- Fanuel Kozonguizi, (SWANU), first national ombudsman
- Dirk Mudge (RP), pre-independence leader of government
- Jeremia Nambinga, (RDP)
- Ben Ulenga (CoD)

=== Traditional leaders ===
- Justus ǁGaroëb (born 1942), Damara chief and politician
- Hosea Kutako (1870–1970), liberation fighter and Herero chief, national hero
- Samuel Maharero (1856–1923), Herero chief, national hero
- Daniel Sitentu Mpasi (1934–2014), king of the Kwangali
- Nehale Mpingana (died 1908), king of Ondonga, national hero
- Mandume ya Ndemufayo (1894–1917), king of the Kwanyama, national hero
- Martha Nelumbu (born 1930), queen of the Kwanyama
- Kahimemua Nguvauva (1850–1896), chief of the Ovambanderu, national hero
- Iipumbu Ya Tshilongo (1875–1959), king of the Uukwambi, national hero
- Hendrik Witbooi (c. 1830–1905), chief of the ǀKhowesin, national hero

=== Activists ===
- Job Amupanda, youth activist who started the Affirmative Repositioning movement
- Niko Bessinger, independence activist and politician
- Pauline Dempers, human rights activist, coordinator of the Breaking the Wall of Silence movement
- Kalla Gertze, former president of the Breaking the Wall of Silence movement and CoD politician
- Alfredo Tjiurimo Hengari, political columnist
- Evilastus Kaaronda, trade unionist
- George Kambala, youth activist
- Veronica de Klerk, women's rights activist
- John Kwedhi, trade unionist
- Blythe Loutit, founder of Save the Rhino Trust
- Anna Mungunda (1932–1959), anti-apartheid activists, national hero
- Rosa Namises, politician and women's rights activist, former member of parliament
- Phil ya Nangoloh, human rights activist
- Dimbulukeni Nauyoma, youth activist
- John Pandeni, former trade unionist and member of cabinet
- Immanuel Shifidi, guerrilla fighter
- Emma Tuahepa, HIV/AIDS activist

== Scientists ==
- Roman Grynberg, professor of economics, University of Namibia (UNAM)
- Nico Horn, theologian and professor of human rights and constitutional law, UNAM
- André du Pisani (born (1949), professor of political science at UNAM
- Gabi Schneider (born (1956), geologist
- Tjama Tjivikua (born 1958), founding rector of the Polytechnic of Namibia

== Sportspeople ==
- Gaby Ahrens (born 1981), Olympic trap shooter
- Collin Benjamin (born 1978), footballer
- Johanna Benson (born 1990), Paralympic athlete and medalist
- Jacques Burger (born 1981), rugby union player
- Dan Craven (born 1983), cyclist
- Merlin Diamond (born 1991), sprinter, national champion
- Trevor Dodds (born 1959), golfer
- Frankie Fredericks (born 1967), Olympic athlete and medalist
- Prince ǃGaoseb (born 1998), rugby union player for the Tel Aviv Heat
- Mannie Heymans (born 1971), cyclist
- Max Katjijeko (born 1995), rugby union player for the Tel Aviv Heat
- Kees Lensing (born 1978), rugby union prop
- Ricardo Mannetti (born 1975), footballer and national football coach
- Beatrice Masilingi (born 2003), Olympic athlete, U20 world champion
- Athiel Mbaha (born 1971), deaf footballer
- Christine Mboma (born 2003), Olympic athlete
- Ali Nuumbembe (born 1978), welterweight boxer
- Ryan Nyambe (born 1997), footballer
- Harry Simon (born 1978), boxer
- Razundara Tjikuzu (born 1979), footballer
- Gerhard Erasmus (born 1995), cricketer

== Other ==
- Christina Van-Dunem Da Fonsech, police officer
- Michelle McLean, former Miss Universe, charity activist
- Behati Prinsloo, model
- Robbie Savage, football fan and socialite
- Hulda Shipanga, matron
