= Life (2024 film) =

2024 film directed by Leonard Tshikesho

Life which is short for ‘Living in faith every day’ is a Namibian film written and directed by Leonard Tshikesho. The film follows the story of a young couple battling for better survival. The couple made bad decisions due to the bad influence in their surroundings.

== Cast ==
includes:

- Monica Pineas as Topcheri
- Fillemon Stephanus as Mabuzza
- Carter Hartz
- James Paulus

Half of the cast members are local who have attended arts institutions, such as the College of the Arts.

== Production ==
The film was filmed in Havana location of Windhoek. and faced a few significant challenges during production.
