= Merlin (given name) =

Merlin is a masculine given name. Notable people with the name include:

== Male ==
- Merlin (rapper), British rapper
- Merlin Bartz (born 1961), American politician
- Merlin Bronques (born 1969), American musician and photographer
- Merlin Cadogan (born 1974), English escapologist
- Merlin Carpenter (born 1967), English visual artist
- Merlin Crossley, Australian molecular biologist, university teacher and administrator
- Merlin A. Ditmer (1886–1950), American basketball coach
- Merlin Donald (born 1939), Canadian psychologist
- Merlin Guilfoyle (1908–1981), American Roman Catholic bishop
- Merlin Hanbury-Tracy, 7th Baron Sudeley (1939–2022), British peer, author and right-wing activist
- Merlin Holland (born 1946), English biographer
- Merlin Hull (1871–1953), American lawyer
- Merlin Hulse (born 1923), American politician
- Merlin James (born 1960), Scottish artist
- Merlin Kopp (1892–1960), American baseball athlete
- Merlin R. Lybbert (1926–2001), Canadian general authority
- Merlin Malinowski (born 1958), retired Canadian National Hockey League player
- Merlin Mann (born 1966), American writer
- Merlin Miller (born 1956), American film director
- Merlin Minshall (1906–1987), British naval officer
- Merlin Nippert (born 1938), American professional baseball player
- Merlin Nunn (1930–2020), Canadian judge
- Merlin Olsen (1940–2010), American football player
- Merlin O'Neill (1898–1981), American commissioned officer
- Merlin Owen Pasco (1892–1918), New Zealand entomologist
- Merlin J. Peterson (1901–1977), American member of the Wisconsin State Assembly
- Merlin Röhl (born 2002), German footballer
- Merlin Santana (1976–2002), American actor
- Merlin F. Schneider (1901–1970), American officer
- Merlin Bingham Swire (born 1973), British businessman
- Merlin Tandjigora (born 1990), Gabonese footballer
- Merlin Little Thunder (born 1956), American artist
- Merlin Tuttle (born 1941), American ecologist
- Merlin Volzke (1925–2013), retired American jockey
- Merlin Wiley (1875–1963), American politician
- Merlin Wittrock (1931–2007), American educational psychologist

== Female ==
- Merlin Diamond (born 1991), Namibian sprinter
- Merlin Udho (born 1953), Guyanese diplomat
- Merlin D'Souza (born 1961), Indian composer
- Merlin Stone (1931–2011), American author
