= Mushimba =

Mushimba is a surname. Notable people with the surname include:

- Aaron Mushimba (1946–2014), Namibian businessperson
- Brian Mushimba (born 1974), Zambian engineer
- Kovambo Nujoma (née Mushimba, born 1931), Namibian politician, sister of Aaron
