= Organization of African First Ladies for Development =

African medical and health charity

Organization of African First Ladies for Development (OAFLAD)
- Founded: 2002; 24 years ago
- Founder: 37 African first ladies
- Type: Not-for-profit, non-governmental organization
- Purpose: HIV/AIDS, PMTCT, Maternal death, Child mortality, Women's empowerment, Youth empowerment
- Location: Addis Ababa, Ethiopia
- Region served: Africa
- Members: 40
- Key people: Monica Geingos, President; Denise Nyakéru Tshisekedi, Vice President
- Website: https://oaflad.org/en/

The Organization of African First Ladies for Development (OAFLAD), originally formed as the Organization of African First Ladies against HIV/AIDS (OAFLA), is a nongovernmental, not-for-profit organization founded in 2002 by 37 African first ladies.

The Organisation of African First Ladies against HIV/AIDS works to cultivate a spirit of solidarity and the exchange of experiences among African first ladies and increase the capacity of First Ladies and other women leaders to advocate for effective solutions to respond to the ongoing HIV/AIDS epidemic, and acts against stigma and discrimination in the fight against HIV/AIDS, develops partnerships with international, regional and local donors, organizations, and partners, and raises awareness, develops, and supports prevention, treatment, and care programs.

== History ==
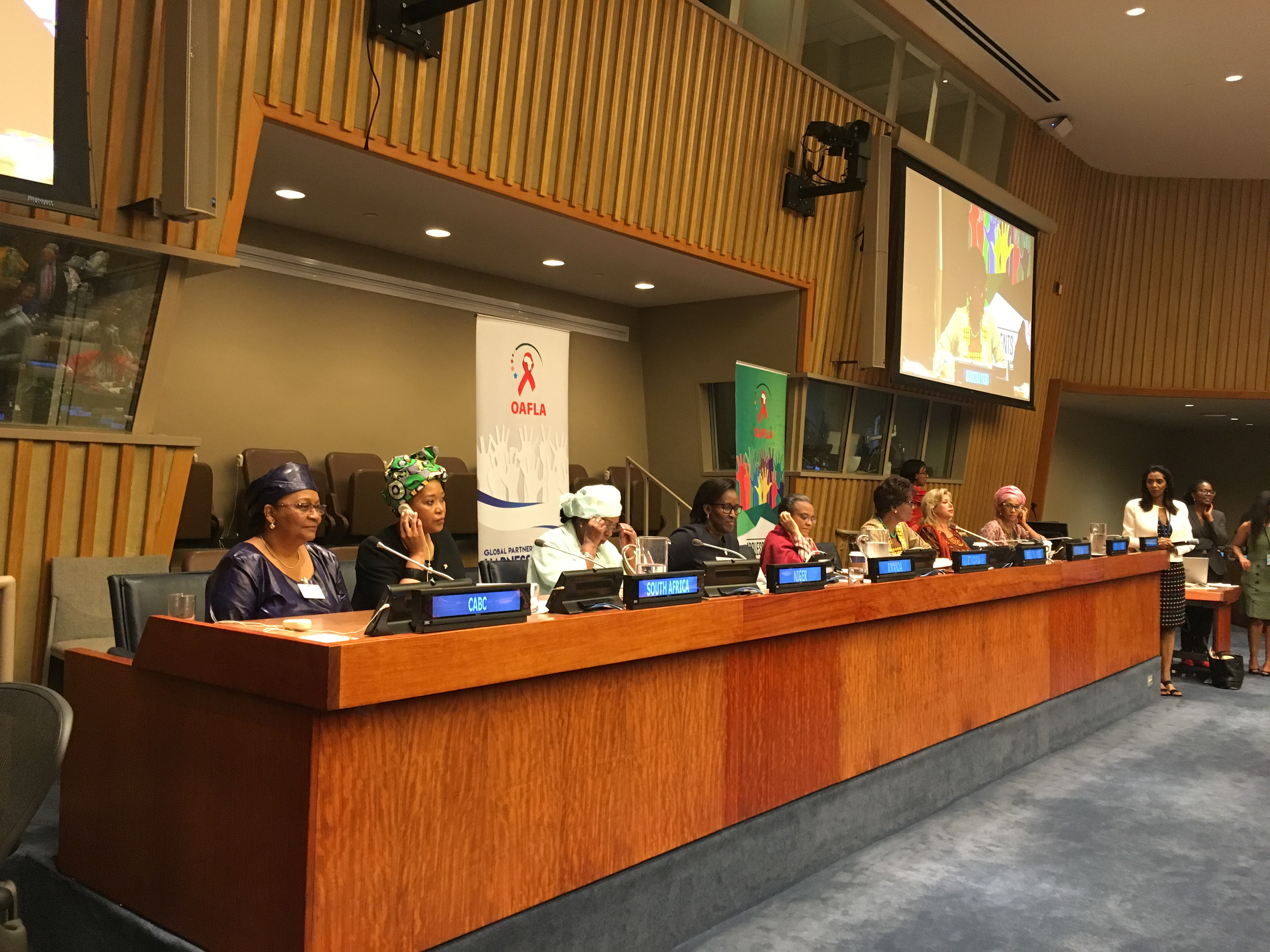
OAFLA High Level Event during the Seventy-second session of the United Nations General Assembly.

In 2002, thirty-seven African first ladies met in Geneva at a meeting facilitated by UNAIDS and the International AIDS Trust (IAT). As a result of this meeting, the organization of African First Ladies against HIV/AIDS (OAFLA) was established as a collective voice for Africa’s most vulnerable people, women and children infected and affected by the HIV/AIDS pandemic.

Since then, OAFLA has transformed itself from a forum of ideas to an institution capable of providing the continent-wide leadership needed to bring about change in peoples’ lives. With its permanent secretariat in Addis Ababa, Ethiopia, OAFLA has moved from addressing the symptoms of the HIV/AIDS crisis to the root causes of poverty and the overall inequality of women in the region.

== Work and Campaigns ==
The organisation and its members have taken on various causes including HIV/AIDS, PMTCT, maternal death, child mortality, women's empowerment, and youth empowerment.

== Member Countries ==
The member countries and leaders as of 2023 are listed below:

- The Republic of Angola
- The Republic of Benin
- The Republic of Botswana
- The Central African Republic
- The Islamic Federal Republic of the Comoros
- The Republic of the Congo
- The Republic of Côte d’Ivoire
- The Arab Republic of Egypt
- The Republic of Equatorial Guinea
- The Federal Democratic Republic of Ethiopia
- The Gabonese Republic
- The First Lady of Ghana
- The Republic of Guinea Bissau
- The Republic of Liberia
- The Republic of Madagascar
- The Republic of Mozambique
- The Federal Republic of Nigeria
- The Republic of Senegal
- The Republic of Sierra Leone
- The Republic of South Sudan
- The Republic of Uganda
- The Republic of Zambia
- The Republic of Zimbabwe

== Steering Committee ==
The steering committee is composed of nine members representing the four regions within the continent.

== Presidents of OAFLA ==
First Lady	Country	Tenure
Edith Lucie Bongo	Gabon	2002-2004
Jeannette Kagame	Rwanda	2004-2006
Maureen Mwanawasa	Zambia	2006-2008
Azeb Mesfin	Ethiopia	2008-2010
Penehupifo Pohamba	Namibia	2010-2012
Hinda Deby Itno	Chad	2012-2014
Lordina Mahama	Ghana	2014-2016
Gertrude Maseko	Malawi	2016–2017
Sika Bella Kaboré	Burkina Faso	2017–2019
Antoinette Sassou Nguesso	(Republic of the Congo) Congo	2019–2022
Monica Geingos	Namibia	2022–present

== Recognition ==
In January 2007, Georgetown University awarded its fifth annual John Thompson Legacy of a Dream Award to the Organisation of African First Ladies Against HIV/AIDS for its leadership and service toward the ideals of Dr. Martin Luther King, Jr.

In January 2017, the former First Lady of Ghana, Lordina Mahama was presented an award from UNAIDS for her work during her term in office as the President of the Organisation of African First Ladies Against HIV/AIDS (OAFLA).

== See also ==
- Jeannette Kagame
