= Manahi =

Manahi is both a given name and a surname. It is a Māori transliteration of the name Manasseh. Notable people with the name include:

- Haane Manahi (1913–1986), New Zealand Māori soldier during the Second World War
- Manahi Nitama Paewai (1920–1990), also known as Doc Paewai, New Zealand doctor, rugby player, local politician

== See also ==
- Faiz Muhammad Manahi Halt railway station, on the now dismantled Tando Adam–Mehrabpur Branch Line in Manahi, Sindh, Pakistan
