= Rapid Results =

Organizational development strategy

Rapid Result is a methodical approach that organizes groups to produce observable outcomes quickly and boost organizational learning. The Stamford, Connecticut based Schaffer management consulting business created this strategy based on its experience helping customers in a variety of industries achieve results. Since then, The New York Times, Harvard Business Review, Foreign Policy, and other publications have acknowledged Rapid Results and its practitioners.

== Methodology ==
The objective of Rapid Results initiatives is to achieve dramatic results, formed under the pressure of short time frames and ambitious targets. Rapid Results initiatives begin with a call to action for significant performance and improvement delivered by a single leader or group of leaders to cross-functional teams of 8-10 people. Team members then set and commit to "seemingly unreasonable" short-term goals — often in 100 days or less — tied to the strategic imperatives outlined by their leaders. Teams then experiment with new ways of working, capturing learning along the way, and persisting until they achieve desired outcomes. Rapid Results aims to stimulate innovation, collaboration, and more effective execution in and across organizations and stakeholder groups. Leaders leverage initial results to create long-term and wide-scale impact in subsequent waves of Rapid Results projects.

== Business impact ==
Leaders in many industries leverage Rapid Results to achieve performance goals, including accelerating growth, increasing productivity, and realizing cost savings.

Lynn Chambers, the group head of Talent at the London Stock Exchange Group, said, "This approach can be taken to accelerate progress on almost any goal." Dean Scarborough, president and chief executive officer of Avery Dennison, described Rapid Results as "driving an incredible amount of creativity among team members." Martha Marsh, the former president and CEO of Stanford Hospital and Clinics, observed that Rapid Results "provide an intense focus on getting results while helping build the capacity of our organization to drive transformational change."

== Rapid Results Institute ==
Formed in 2007, the Rapid Results Institute works with a broad range of partners — including government agencies, nonprofit organizations, and international development agencies — across a wide spectrum of development initiatives. Past and ongoing projects include H.I.V. prevention in Eritrea and Ethiopia, public sector reform in Kenya, waste management in Brazil, and housing homeless veterans in the United States.

The Rapid Results Institute is partnering with the 100,000 Homes Campaign and the US Department of Veterans Affairs to house homeless veterans across the United States.

== Development impact ==
Following a project on HIV/AIDS awareness among youth, Eritrean Minister of Education Osman Saleh called the Rapid Results approach "a new movement." In Kenya, an independent evaluation by the AIDS Research and Treatment journal reported that “significant improvement in PMTCT (prevention of mother-to-child-transmission) services can be achieved through the introduction of RRI (Rapid Results Initiative), which appears to lead to sustainable benefits for pregnant HIV-infected women and their infants.”

Due to its success in a variety of contexts, the Rapid Results approach has been adopted by the World Bank, as well as by many Kenyan government ministries.
