= Manasseh =

Manasseh (Hebrew: מְנַשֶּׁה, Modern: Menaše, Tiberian: Mənaššé) is both a given name and a surname. Its variants include Manasses and Manasse.

Notable people with the name include:

== Surname ==
- Ezekiel Saleh Manasseh (died 1944), Singaporean rice and opium merchant and hotelier
- Jacob Manasseh (died 1832), Ottoman rabbi
- Leonard Manasseh (1916–2017), British architect
- Maurice Manasseh (born 1943), English cricketer

== Given name ==
- Manasseh (tribal patriarch), first son of Joseph
  - Tribe of Manasseh
- Manasseh of Judah, king of Judah in the 7th century BC
- Manasseh II, hypothetical Jewish ruler of the Khazars in the 9th century AD
- Manasseh Azure, freelance journalist in Accra, Ghana
- Manasseh Masseh Lopes (1755–1831), British politician
- Manasseh Magok Rundial, South Sudanese politician
- Manasseh Sogavare (born 1955), Solomon Islands politician and Prime Minister
- Manasseh Gahima (born 1970), Rwandan Anglican bishop

== Fictional characters ==
- Manasseh da Costa, The King of Schnorrers
