= Franja =

Franja may refer to:

- La Franja, the area of Catalan-speaking territories of eastern Aragon bordering Catalonia
- Franja Transversal del Norte, a region in Guatemala
- Antonio Franja (born 1978), Croatian footballer
- Ezmiralda Franja (born 1997), Albanian footballer
- Franja du Plessis (born 1994), Namibian singer

== See also ==
- Democratic Convergence of La Franja, a political party in La Franja
- Franja Partisan Hospital, in Slovenia during World War II, now a museum
