= Kanuni (disambiguation) =

Kanuni refers to the Ottoman Sultan Suleiman the Magnificent (1494–1566), as the term for his title as "the lawgiver" in Turkish.

Kanuni may also refer to:

- Kanuni (hompa) (c. 1900 – 1972), hompa of Kwangali in the Okavango region of Namibia
- Kanuni (drillship), a Turkish drillship
- Kanun (Albania), a set of Albanian law texts
