= Breaking the Wall of Silence =

Namibian NGO for the rights of SWAPO detainees

Breaking the Wall of Silence (BWS) is a non-governmental organization (NGO) in Windhoek, the capital of Namibia. It is named after Siegfried Groth's book Namibia. The Wall of Silence, and was formed at the occasion of the book's release in 1996.

Namibia's independence movement SWAPO, today its ruling political party, detained, tortured and killed members of its own movement in the Lubango dungeons in southern Angola in the 1980s, the final years of the Namibian War of Independence. People that had previously been detained by the South African apartheid government, but also those close to suspected spies were accused of having turned against the liberation movement, and of spying on behalf of the oppressors. Victims included prominent people such as Bience Gawanas, later ombudsperson of Namibia, and Aaron Muchimba, businessman and brother-in-law of Sam Nujoma. Gwen Lister claims that also Hage Geingob, Namibia's third president, "would have been detained if the Zimbabwean president, Robert Mugabe, had not intervened". The last detainees were released in May 1989.

Siegfried Groth, a German pastor in SWAPO's Angolan refugee camps, exposed the atrocities at Lubango, causing the foundation of the BWS, a fierce debate on national reconciliation, and a "furious response from Swapo". BWS advocates for an acknowledgement of the goings-on at Lubango as well as for an official apology by SWAPO. Kalla Gertze was the first president of this organisation. Pauline Dempers became the organisation's coordinator in 1999 and, as of 2008, was still in that position. Both were affected personally by the detentions and served time in the Lubango dungeons.
