= HIV/AIDS in Timor-Leste =

The southeast-Asian nation of Timor-Leste (formerly East Timor) has dealt with HIV/AIDS since its first documented case in 2001. It has one of the lowest HIV/AIDS-prevalence rates in the world.

== Prevalence ==
In 2008, Timor-Leste was a low HIV-prevalence country with less than 0.2 percent of the adult population estimated to be HIV-positive. Social factors such as massive social dislocation, cross-border migration, high unemployment, and a weak and limited health system could dramatically increase the spread of HIV infection. Many young people are not well-equipped with the knowledge and life skills to manage HIV risk in an increasingly challenging environment.

The first HIV/AIDS case in Timor-Leste was detected in 2001. Forty-three cases of the disease were confirmed in 2007 and are now under treatment. Limited surveillance capabilities and inadequate testing could mean that more people are infected.

In 2008, with low HIV prevalence among the general population, there were signs of a low-level epidemic among Timor-Leste’s sex workers and men who have sex with men (MSM). In 2003, HIV-prevalence rates among sex workers and MSM were 3 percent and 1 percent, respectively. Among female sex workers (FSWs), 14 percent tested positive for gonorrhea, 15 percent for chlamydia, 16 percent for trichomonas and 60 percent for herpes simplex virus-2. No comparable data have been collected since, and consequently, the current situation is unknown. Timor-Leste is also vulnerable due to its close proximity to nearby countries that are experiencing localized epidemics such as Indonesia and Papua New Guinea.

General public health knowledge on primary health care, including reproductive health, sexually transmitted infections (STIs), and HIV/AIDS, is very limited, especially in remote areas. In 2007, only 50.7 percent of the population 15 years old and over had heard about HIV/AIDS. Among those in that same population group who think it can be avoided, only 41.8 percent knew that it can be avoided by use of condoms.

Other factors that contribute to the risk and impact of HIV/AIDS among women include domestic violence, lower literacy and education levels, and cultural constraints in discussing issues of sex. Providing the general population with information to combat HIV/AIDS is complicated due to low prevalence and limited access to the communities. In 2004, most people lived in the rural areas, mainly around the northern coastal regions in small, dispersed villages. In 2003, more than 60 percent of women and 70 percent of men do not recognize any method of family planning, and only 10 percent of women are using any contraceptive method.

Timor-Leste can still be classified as a conflict country. The civil unrest that erupted in April/May 2006 continues to be unsettled and constitutes a risk for high rates of domestic violence and sexual assault, thereby leaving women more vulnerable to infection since they are unable to negotiate condom use. Timor has a high tuberculosis (TB) burden, with 250 new cases per 100,000 people in 2005, according to the World Health Organization.

In 2008, of the 43 cases under treatment, at least three people had HIV-TB co-infections, two children under five received the infection from their mothers, and two pregnant women are under prevention of mother-to-child transmission (PMTCT) HIV treatment.

== National response ==
HIV/AIDS has had a devastating impact on other countries in comparable circumstances to Timor-Leste. Among Timor-Leste’s nearest neighbors, Papua New Guinea appears to be in the early stages of a generalized HIV epidemic that threatens to not only halt, but also reverse the development achievements the nation has made in its relatively short history. Many of the circumstances that have led to the current HIV situation in Papua New Guinea are also present in Timor-Leste, including large-scale social dislocation and high levels of HIV-related risk.

In 2002 a National HIV/AIDS/STI Strategic Plan (2002–2005) was adopted. In the period since, Timor-Leste has adopted and implemented strategies, policies, programs, and projects to address HIV/AIDS. However, among key stakeholders, it is generally accepted that while many effective activities have been implemented, overall coordination is weak, and important gaps exist. Knowledge about HIV/AIDS across the general population remains low, the level of unsafe sex practices is high, and STI rates are also high.

In mid-2005, the Ministry of Health, with support from UN Agencies and key civil society organizations, initiated a process to review the National HIV/AIDS/STI Strategic Plan (2002–2005) and develop a new national strategic plan to cover the period 2006–2010. The new National Strategic Plan for HIV/AIDS/STIs 2006–2010 was approved by the Council of Ministers in August 2006. The goal is "to maintain Timor-Leste as a low prevalence HIV nation and minimize the adverse consequences for those infected with HIV". Four program components were identified:

- Prevention and education targeting the population in general and more specifically most-at-risk groups (MARGs), which include MSM, FSW, clients of sex workers, people in uniform, and young people;
- Voluntary counseling and testing targeting MARGs and PMTCT; and
- Clinical services: ensure availability of antiretroviral treatment to all diagnosed people; develop policies, protocols, and procedures to all aspect of patient management; STI treatment services; procurement and supply of drugs and other commodities; and blood safety.

A key part of the national strategy is the establishment of the National AIDS Commission, to provide independent advice to the Government of Timor-Leste on all matters related to HIV/AIDS and to monitor and advise on the progress in implementation of the National Strategic Program.

In 2006, the Global Fund to Fight AIDS, Tuberculosis and Malaria approved a fifth-round grant for Timor-Leste to scale up the national response to HIV/AIDS through the delivery of services and information to at-risk populations and people living with HIV/AIDS. The grant was signed in December 2006 and now is on quarter three implementation. Assessment reports show good performance in relation to targets settled for quarter 1 and quarter 2.
