= Bueno (surname) =

Bueno is a Spanish surname. Notable people with the surname include:

- Abraão José Bueno, Brazilian serial killer
- Abraham Bueno de Mesquita, Dutch comedian
- Alberto Bueno, Spanish footballer
- Alex Bueno (1963–2026), Dominican musical artist
- Alexandre Bueno (1951–2019), Brazilian footballer
- Alexei Bueno (1963–2026), Brazilian poet
- Amador Bueno, Brazilian colonist
- Ángel Bueno, Cuban hurdler
- Bruce Bueno de Mesquita (born 1946), American political scientist
- Cacá Bueno, Brazilian racer
- Carlos Bueno, Uruguayan footballer
- Caterina Bueno, Italian singer
- Daniel Mariano Bueno, Brazilian footballer
- Descemer Bueno, Cuban singer
- Francisley Bueno, Cuban baseball player
- Galvão Bueno, Brazilian personality and commentator
- Gastón Bueno, Uruguayan footballer
- Gustavo Bueno, Spanish philosopher
- José Bueno y Monreal, Spanish cardinal
- José Luis Bueno, Mexican boxer
- Juan Bueno Torio, Mexican politician
- Luis Bueno, Cuban long jumper
- Luiz Bueno, Brazilian racer
- Manolín Bueno, Spanish footballer
- Maria Bueno, Brazilian tennis player
- Nakor Bueno, Spanish footballer
- Ricardo Bueno Fernández, Spanish politician
- Rodrigo Bueno, Argentine singer
- Sebastián Bueno, Argentine footballer
- Vincent Bueno, Austrian-Filipino singer

== Fictional characters ==
- Manassseh Bueno Barzillai Azevedo da Costa, The King of Schnorrers
