= Exit Music (disambiguation) =

Exit Music is a crime novel by Ian Rankin.

Exit Music or Exit music may also refer to:

- "Exit Music (For a Film)", a Radiohead song
- Exit Music Publishing Inc., a Japanese media company
- Exit Music: Songs with Radio Heads, a tribute album
- Exit (musician) (born 1989), Namibian kwaito musician
- Exit (festival), a Serbian music festival
