= Abraham Kanime =

Namibian policeman

- Born: 1960 (age 65–66); Omusati Region, South West Africa
- Occupation: Police chief
- Employer: Windhoek City Police

Abraham Kanime (born 19 May 1960) is a retired Namibian police officer who served as the chief of the country's only metropolitan Police force, the Windhoek City Police.

== Early life ==
Kanime was born in 1960 in Omusati Region of northern Namibia. He went to school in the then South West Africa during the time of SWAPO's struggles for independence from the South African apartheid regime.

== Police career ==
Kanime has been a member of the Namibian Police Force since 1995. In 2004, he helped found the Windhoek City Police. That same year, he was appointed as chief of Windhoek municipality's police division. Kanime was suspended from his position in 2018 by the City of Windhoek's chief executive after almost two decades in office; leading to infighting within the city's Police division. In January 2019, president Hage Geingob ordered that Kanime and the city's CEO, Robert Kahimise be reinstated immediately.

Kanime was due to retire in May 2020 on his 60th birthday and resigned from his position accordingly. He was, however, reappointed for another three-year period. Some city councillors called for Kanime's reappointment to be rescinded, on the grounds of corruption within the process. As of April 2023 his successor has not yet been named.
