= Schnorrer =

Yiddish term meaning beggar or sponger

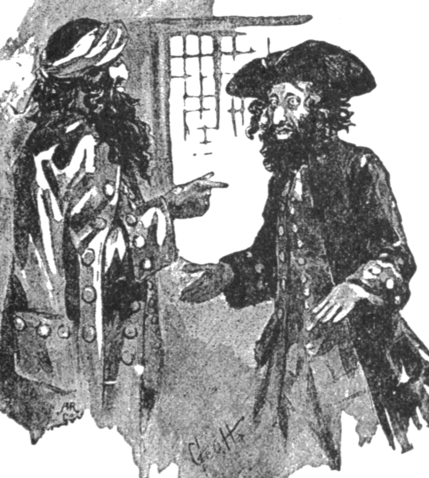
"The King of Schnorrers" Manasseh da Costa (left) and his sidekick Yankele

Schnorrer (שנאָרער; also spelled shnorrer) is a Yiddish pejorative term for a beggar who, unlike ordinary beggars, presents himself as respectable and feels entitled for the alms received.

== Historical ==
A large number of beggars appeared in the Polish–Lithuanian Commonwealth after the pogroms of the Khmelnytsky Uprising, when many homes were destroyed. Schnorrers begged for themselves, for the dowries of poor brides (Yiddish: הכנסת-כלה, romanized: hakhnóses-kale), or for the restoration of a house that had burned down. This practice was allowed even when it disrupted the public study of the Torah. Azriel Hildesheimer was described as the "international schnorrer" for his calls for philanthropy in many countries he visited.

Milton Hindus, commenting on the picaresque novel The King of Schnorrers, wrote that the Jews did not regard outcasts as failures, and assumed social responsibility for them. "Properly exploited by a fertile intelligence like Menasseh’s, this attitude enables the ostensible mendicant to become the actual master in the eleemosynary relationship."

== Jewish humor ==
Schnorrers are a common butt of Jewish jokes, depicted as living off their wits and assuming a dignified entitlement to handouts.

(One of many variants) A schnorrer comes to a wealthy businessman and asks for a handout. "Have a pity for a poor shoemaker whose family is starving." - "But aren't you the one who asked for alms from me last week presenting yourself as a carpenter?" - "So true, who can in these bad times support himself from just one job?"

Moishe the shnorrer is outraged to hear that his wealthy patron has halved his annual allowance. The donor apologetically explains that his son has married a woman of expensive tastes and he, the father, must foot the bill. "He can marry who he wants," retorts the shnorrer. "Just not with my money."

Sigmund Freud in his 1905 joke collection Jokes and Their Relation to the Unconscious (its 1905 translation is in public domain now together with the original) gives the following interpretation of a shnorrer's entitlement.

The Schnorrer begged the Baron for some money for a journey to Ostend; his doctor had recommended sea-bathing for his troubles. The Baron thought Ostend was a particularly expensive resort; a cheaper one would do equally well. The Schnorrer, however, rejected the proposal with the words: "Herr Baron, I consider nothing too expensive for my health."

This is an excellent displacement joke which we might have taken as a model for that class. The Baron evidently wants to save his money, but the Schnorrer answers as though the Baron’s money was his own, which he may then quite well value less than his health. Here we are expected to laugh at the impertinence of the demand; but it is rarely that these jokes are not equipped with a façade to mislead the understanding. The truth that lies behind is that the Schnorrer, who in his thoughts treats the rich man’s money as his own, has actually, according to the sacred ordinances of the Jews, almost a right to make this confusion. The indignation raised by this joke is of course directed against a Law which is highly oppressive even to pious people.

Here is another anecdote:

A Schnorrer on his way up a rich man’s staircase met a fellow member of his profession, who advised him to go no further. "Don’t go up today," he said, "the Baron is in a bad mood today; he’s giving nobody more than one florin." - "I’II go up all the same," said the first Schnorrer "Why should I give him a florin? Does he give me anything?"

This joke employs the technique of absurdity since it makes the Schnorrer assert that the Baron gives him nothing at the very moment at which he is preparing to beg him for a gift. But the absurdity is only apparent. It is almost true that the rich man gives him nothing since he is obliged by the Law to give him alms and should, strictly speaking, be grateful to him for giving him an opportunity for beneficence. The ordinary, middle-class view of charity is in conflict here with the religious one;...

== In film and literature ==
- Israel Zangwill's 1894 picaresque novel The King of Schnorrers.
  - Bernard Herrmann wrote a musical comedy based on Zangwill's novel, which ran on Broadway for a short time in 1979.
- The song "Hooray for Captain Spaulding", as performed in The Marx Brothers' 1930 film Animal Crackers, has in its chorus the line "Hooray for Captain Spaulding, the African explorer," to which Groucho, in character as Captain Spaulding, at one point retorts "Did someone call me schnorrer?"
- Father Phil, in Season 1 of The Sopranos, often refers to himself as a "schnorrer," going to parishioner's homes to eat their home cooking, commonly that of Carmela Soprano. He defines a "schnorrer" as "Somebody who always shows up in time for free grub." He attributes this language to growing up in Yonkers, NY, among many Jewish people.
