= The King of Schnorrers =

Israel Zangwill's 1894 novel

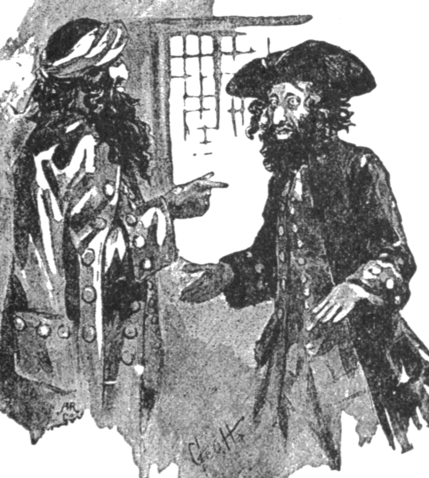
Manasseh da Costa and Yankele: "Vat more proof do you vant of my begging powers?" demanded Yankele, spreading out his palms and shrugging his shoulders.

The King of Schnorrers is Israel Zangwill's 1894 picaresque novel, a collection of amusing tragicomic episodes of schnorring by "Manasseh Bueno Barzillai Azevedo da Costa, thenceforward universally recognised, and hereby handed down to tradition, as the King of Schnorrers", in England on the break of 18th/19th centuries, illustrated by Jewish prints and caricatures of the period.

== Literary criticism ==
The novel describes the exploits of two schnorrers, Manasseh Bueno Barzillai Azevedo da Costa, a Sephardi Jew, and his sidekick Yankele ben Itzhok, an Ashkenazi (specifically, a Polish Jew). (The fact that they are from different Jewish communities is at the center of the conflict in the plot of Chapter 5 "Showing How the King Dissolved the Mahamad".)

Manasseh deals with life with his wit and "the truly Hidalgo pride". Manasseh's frequent victim is Joseph Grobstock, a nouveau riche capitalist.

A significant component of Zangwill's humor are the traditions of charity and mutual responsibility in Jewish communities. Milton Hindus wrote that the Jews did not regard outcast Jews as failures and assumed social responsibility for them. "Properly exploited by a fertile intelligence like Menasseh’s, this attitude enables the ostensible mendicant to become the actual master in the eleemosynary relationship," wrote Hindus.

The popularity of the novel at the time prompted the author to write a script for the stage. The play debuted in London in 1925. It was not published at the time and thought to be lost until Edna Nahshon of Jewish Theological Seminary of America discovered it (with some other Zangwill's originals) and it is now at deposit in the British Library. It was published in 1986 in the volume From the Ghetto to Melting Pot: Israel Zangwill's Jewish Plays: Three Playscripts.

== Influence ==
Bernard Herrmann wrote a musical comedy based on Zangwill's novel in 1968, which ran on Broadway for a short time in 1979. It was revived in 1990s on Los Angeles scenes by Judd Woldin. It was a reworked version of Woldin's Petticoat Lane, a reworked Zangwill's episode about two lovers from two divided Jewish communities.
