= Nicky Marais =

Namibian artist (born 1962)

- Born: 1962 (age 63–64); Rustenburg
- Known for: Painting
- Parent: Christine Marais

Nicky Marais, born in 1962 in Rustenburg, South Africa, is a Namibian artist who lives and works in Windhoek. She has worked as a painter, mixed-media artist, activist, and educator.

== Biography ==
After obtaining a fine arts degree from the Port Elizabeth Technikon (now part of the Nelson Mandela University), Marais moved to Windhoek in 1987. There, she began exhibiting her work and joined the editorial board of the feminist magazine Sister Namibia.

In 2006, she founded the collective VA-N (Visual Artists Namibia).

In 2012, she became head of the Visual Arts department at the College of the Arts. In addition to many local exhibitions, she has also exhibited in South Africa, Austria, and Germany.

== Work ==
Marais is primarily an abstract painter. She first worked on the relationships between shapes and colors, drawing inspiration from the Namibian landscape —particularly the cave paintings of the Namib Desert — and the socio-political history of Namibia.

More recent work uses stencil and collage techniques, while incorporating found objects into her work, as in her exhibition Presence in Absence at the National Art Gallery of Namibia in 2017, in which she focused on a set of new symbols.

== See also ==
- Culture of Namibia
- History of Namibia
