= Daniel Sitentu Mpasi =

Namibian tribal king (1934–2014)

Daniel Sitentu Mpasi (7 June 1934 – 17 December 2014) was Hompa (king) of the Uukwangali tribe in northern Namibia. His residence was at Mayara village in the Nkurenkuru district. 20th in the genealogy of Uukwangali kings, Mpasi succeeded Hompa Joseph Kandjimi Murangi after his death in 1977. He was crowned in 1979. and reigned until his death in 2014.

Mpasi was praised by former president of Namibia, Sam Nujoma, for his role in the struggle for independence. In 2010 Hifikepunye Pohamba, then president, acknowledged Mpasi's efforts to develop the region under his reign.

He was succeeded by his grand-nephew, Eugene Siwombe Kudumo as Hompa of the Uukwangali tribe on April 25, 2015.
