= Manasse (surname) =

Manasse is a surname. Notable people with the surname include:

- Jon Manasse (born 1965), American clarinetist
- Joseph S. Manasse (1831–1897), Prussian American merchant
- Maegan Manasse (born 1995), American tennis player
- Nabot Manasse (died 1958), Namibian Lutheran priest
- Paul Manasse (1866–1927), German physician
