= Heikki Hausiku Ausiku =

Namibian diplomat (born 1944)

Reverend Heikki Hausiku Ausiku
- Born: 23 April 1944 (age 82); Nkurenkuru
- Occupations: Politician, former ambassador to cuba, former mayor of nkurenkuru, former traditional councilor and former special advisor

Rev. Heikki Hausiku Ausiku (1944) is a Namibian politician who served as the Ambassador to Cuba (1991–1999). He is a member of South West Africa People's Organisation (SWAPO) party and was a member of the National Assembly of Namibia from 1989 to 1990. He was the former mayor of Nkurenkuru. He also served as a traditional councilor at Kwangali Traditional Authority in 2010. He was appointed as the special advisor to Sirkka Ausiku in 2014.

== Personal life ==
Rev. Heikki Hausiku Ausiku was born on April 23, 1944, in Nkurenkuru, South West Africa (present-day Namibia). Rev. Ausiku was a teacher at Nkurenkuru Lower Primary School in 1966. He married Martha Ngundo Ndara-Ausiku in 1970. He has nine children and 13 grandchildren. In 1973, the Lutheran Church ordained him as a pastor. He worked sporadically as the presiding pastor and associate pastor in three parishes, where he spent a lot of time. During his studies in the US from 1976 to 1979, he was assisting as a part-time pastor at St. James Lutheran Parish in Gettysburg, Pennsylvania. He was also Elcin Church's deputy circuit dean in Rundu Deanery, Kavango Region, from 1980 to 1981. From 1980 to 1990, he was the principal managing director of the Kavango Bible School of Elcin at Nkurenkuru.

== Education ==
He attended the Simanya, Nkurenkuru, Rupara (1958–1965) and Rundu Secondary School from 1967 to 1969. From 1970 to 1973, Lutheran Theological Seminary, Paulinum, Otjimbingue, Namibia. Did a Diploma in Theology (1970–73), Evangelical Lutheran Theological Seminary, Paulinum, Otjimbingwe, Namibia.

Diploma in Spanish (1997) Centre for Languages and Computers for Foreigners "Jose Marti" Institute, Havana, Cuba. Certificate in Computer Literacy (1998), Centre for Languages and Computer "Jose Marti" Institute, Havana, Cuba. Diploma in 'Understanding Modern China Program' Foreign Affairs College of China, September and November.

== Political career ==
Rev. Ausiku was detained when the People's Liberation Army of Namibia (PLAN) operations were in the Kavango Region from 1980 until 1983. He was one of the 72 elected delegates that constituted the First Constituent National Assembly of Namibia from 1989 to 1990. He was appointed as a traditional councillor at Kwangali Traditional Authority and was the first mayor of Nkurenkuru from 2006 to 2010. In 2014, President Hifikepunye Pohamba appointed him to serve as Sirkka Ausiku's special advisor.
