= Sustjie Mbumba =

Namibian businesswoman and First Lady of Namibia

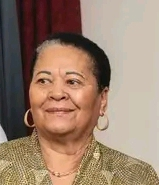

First Lady of Namibia
- In role 4 February 2024 – 21 March 2025
- President: Nangolo Mbumba
- Preceded by: Monica Geingos
- Succeeded by: Epaphras Denga Ndaitwah (As First Gentleman)

Personal details
- Born: 1 May 1953 (age 73) Rehoboth
- Spouse: Nangolo Mbumba
- Occupation: Businesswoman

Sustjie Mbumba (born May 1953) is a Namibian businesswoman who served as the 4th First Lady of Namibia, from 4 February 2024 to 21 March 2025, while her husband Nangolo Mbumba served as a President of Namibia upon the death of President Hage Geingob in February 2024. Mbumba is one of the survivors of the Lubango dungeons for being malicious accused to be spying for South African colonial regime.

== Education and Early Career ==
Madam Sustjie Mbumba studied in Jamaica. She is a qualified Oral Health and Dental Therapist. After Independence she joined the Ministry of Health and Social Services and was instrumental in the development of the National AIDS Policy Framework and the implementation of the National AIDS Control Programme.
