= Faiz Muhammad Manahi Halt railway station =

Railway station in Pakistan

Faiz Muhammad Manahi Halt Station فيض محمد مناهي هالٽ اسٽيشن

General information
- Owner: Ministry of Railways
- Line: Tando Adam–Mehrabpur Branch Line

Other information
- Station code: FZM

Faiz Muhammad Manahi Halt railway station (Urdu: فیض محمد مناہی ہالٹ ریلوے اسٹیشن, Sindhi: فيض محمد مناهي هالٽ ريلوي اسٽيشن) is located on the now dismantled Tando Adam–Mehrabpur Branch Line in Manahi, Sindh, Pakistan.

== See also ==
- List of railway stations in Pakistan
- Pakistan Railways
