= First Ladies and Gentlemen of Namibia =

Title of the spouse of the president of Namibia

Office of the First Gentleman of Namibia
- Coat of Arms of Namibia
- Incumbent; Lt. Gen. Epaphras Denga Ndaitwah since 21 March 2025
- Inaugural holder: Kovambo Nujoma
- Formation: 21 March 1990

The First Lady of Namibia or First Gentleman of Namibia is the title attributed to the spouse of the President of Namibia, serving in the Office of the First Spouse of Namibia concurrently with the president's term of office.

Since the country's independence in 1990, there have been four First Ladies and one First Gentleman. The title is currently held by Lt. Gen. Epaphras Denga Ndaitwah, the husband of President Netumbo Nandi-Ndaitwah.

== First Ladies and Gentlemen of Namibia ==
No.	Portrait	Name (Birth-Death)	Term of office			President	Notes
No.	Portrait	Name (Birth-Death)	Term start	Term end	Time in office	President	Notes
1		Kovambo Nujoma (born 1933)	21 March 1990	21 March 2005	15 years, 0 days	Sam Nujoma (1929–2025)	
2		Penehupifo Pohamba (1948–2026)	21 March 2005	21 March 2015	10 years, 0 days	Hifikepunye Pohamba (born 1935)	
3		Monica Geingos (born 1976)	21 March 2015	4 February 2024	8 years, 320 days	Hage Geingob (1941–2024)	
4		Sustjie Mbumba (born 1953)	4 February 2024	21 March 2025	1 year, 45 days	Nangolo Mbumba (born 1941)	
5		Epaphras Denga Ndaitwah (born 1952)	21 March 2025	Present	1 year, 211 days	Netumbo Nandi-Ndaitwah (born 1952)	

== See also ==
- List of presidents of Namibia
