= Juanita du Plessis =

Namibian singer

- Born: Juanita Naudé; April 26 (Note: Reliable sources have not reported the year of her birth); Windhoek, South West Africa
- Genres: Afrikaans country pop
- Occupation: Singer
- Years active: 1998–present
- Label: Juanita Records
- Website: juanitaduplessis.co.za

Juanita du Plessis (born April 26) is a Namibian-South African Afrikaans country singer. She became known for her song Ska-Rumba. Du Plessis' singing career began in 1998 with her debut album Juanita. That year she won the CMA (Country Music Association in Namibia) awards as best singer, best songwriter and the Association's Award for outstanding achievement.

Her record sales total over 3,000,000. In 2010 she received a South African Music award in the category Best Afrikaans DVD for her 10 Year Hit Celebration Production. The DVD contains her most successful hits over the first 10 years of her singing career. She was also crowned the most popular female artist for the seventh consecutive year at the Huisgenoot's Tempo Awards ceremony in Johannesburg during 2011. In 2018 she celebrated 20 years in the music industry, releasing a greatest hits album 20 Jaar – Treffers van 2008–2018.

== Albums ==
- Young Hearts (platinum)
- Ek en Jy (Ska-rumba) (3× platinum)
- Dis waar ek wil wees (2× platinum)
- Jy is... (3 x platinum)
- Altyd Daar (3× platinum)
- Bly by my (2× platinum)
- Jou Skaduwee (2× platinum)
- Vlieg Hoog (5× platinum)
- Volmaakte Kring (3× platinum)
- Bring jou Hart, duet with Theuns Jordaan (3× platinum)
- 10 Jaar Platinum Treffers (4× platinum)
- Engel van my hart (4× platinum)
- Wees Lig (3× platinum) (SA No. 1)
- Hart vol Drome, duet with Theuns Jordaan (Platinum)
- Jy Voltooi My (2× Platinum) (SA No. 3)
- Nashville (Platinum) (SA No. 15)
- Toe Staan Die Wêreld Stil (Platinum) (SA No. 7)
- Koningskind (Platinum) (SA No. 7)
- Kaalvoetkinners (Juanita du Plessis, Franja du Plessis & Ruan Josh) Goud
- 20 Jaar – Treffers van 2008–2018
- Dis Tyd (SA No. 1) Goud
- Sing country (Juanita du Plessis, Franja du Plessis, Ruan Josh)
- Remixes 2025 EP

Singles:

- Just an illusion 2019 ( 16 million views you tube: Trippel platinum)
- Maak dit los 2019 (1.6 million views you tube: Gold)
- Dis tyd (musiek video you tube 1.4 million views Goud)
- Sonneblom uit Bethlehem 2021
- Ska-rumba 2022 (remix)
- Liewe Jinne 2023 (8.7 million views you tube:Trippel Platinum)
- Ek belowe 2024
- Dis 'n vibe 2024 (1.3 million views you tube: Goud)
- Africa 2024 (various artists)
- Oulik verby 2025

Several albums are in Afrikaans and the titles of these are kept in the original language.

== DVDs ==
- Juanita Op haar Beste (direct, 4× platinum)
- Altyd daar DVD (2× platinum)
- Bring jou hart, duet with Theuns Jordaan (5× platinum)
- 10 Jaar Platinum Treffers DVD (3× platinum)
- Tydloos... Die Musiekvideo's (platinum)
- Hart vol Drome, duet with Theuns Jordaan (2× platinum)
- Tydloos 2 (Die Musiekvideo's)

== Personal life ==
Du Plessis was born on April 26 in Windhoek, South West Africa (present-day Namibia). She and her husband Doepie have three children: Ruan (son) and twins Mario (son) and Franja (daughter). Franja and Ruan Josh are both singers.
