= Robert Kahimise =

Namibian businessperson

Robert Naanda Kahimise is a Namibian businessperson and CEO of the City of Windhoek. He was appointed to the position in 2016. Previously, he served as executive officer of the Erongo Regional Electricity Distributor where he has served since July 2013.

== Career ==
Kahimise's career began as an assistant at the Ministry of Lands and Revenue in the 1990s. He was promoted to administrator in the ministry in 1999. From 2012 to 2016, he served as the Chief Executive Officer of Erongo Red, a power utility company in Erongo region. In April 2016, he was appointed CEO of the City of Windhoek following a lengthy process that saw Andrew Burger, the preferred candidate, reject the job citing the 2.6 million N$ proposed annual salary as being little.

Following his appointment in 2016, Kahimise has reduced rate fees for the municipality and engaged in the provision of services to informal settlements. However, his term of time in office has been of controversy. He was suspended from the position of Windhoek City CEO in 2018 by the city's councillors after he led the suspension of Windhoek City Police chief Abraham Kanime. On 30 January 2019, following months of infighting in the city's council board, president Hage Geingob ordered for the reinstatement of both Kahimise and Kanime.
