= Matias Shikondomboro =

First Namibian Lutheran ordained pastor

Matias Shikondomboro (born in Kavango, Namibia) was the first Kavango native to be ordained a Lutheran pastor.

Shikondomboro came to the Finnish mission station of Nkurenkuru in early 1930 to work as an assistant in the mission kitchen under the leadership of Aatu Järvineva. He converted to Christianity a few years later, and in 1935 he was sent to the seminary in Oniipa, Ovamboland, where he studied to become a teacher.

Having finished the teacher training, he returned to Kavango, and worked as a teacher and evangelist. In 1942, he was ordained into priesthood, after which he continued to work in Kavango.

Shikondomboro is known to have visited Finland on at least one occasion. He is the author of the book Ken kulkee hän näkee. Noidan pojasta papiksi (‘Who travels, he sees. From the son of a witch to a pastor’), published in Finnish in 1965.

== Sources ==
- Peltola, Matti (1958). Sata vuotta suomalaista lähetystyötä 1859–1959. II: Suomen Lähetysseuran Afrikan työn historia [One Hundred Years of Finnish Missionary Work 1859–1959. II: The History of FMS's Missionary Work in Africa]. Helsinki: The Finnish Missionary Society.
