= Pauline Dempers =

Namibian human rights activist and politician

Pauline Frannzisca Dempers (born 28 April 1962 in Aranos, Hardap Region) is a Namibian human rights activist and politician. In 1996, Dempers became national coordinator for Breaking the Wall of Silence (BWS), a group which advocates for the rights of those detained by SWAPO during the Namibian War of Independence. Dempers was active with the Congress of Democrats.

== Career ==
Dempers was a prominent anti-apartheid activist in southern Namibia prior to fleeing into exile in 1983 to join SWAPO. She was arrested by SWAPO in 1986 while living in a refugee camp near Lubango in southern Angola. Along with hundreds of other Namibian exiles, Dempers was accused of having turned against the liberation movement, and of spying on behalf of the oppressors. They were tortured and held in the 'dungeons' of Lubango in the final years of the Namibian War of Independence. She was released in March 1989 and repatriated to Namibia following the moves towards independence which culminated in March 1990.

Dempers became national coordinator for Breaking the Wall of Silence (BWS) in 1999, three years after its formation. BWS is a non-governmental organization named after Siegfried Groth's book Namibia. The Wall of Silence that exposed the atrocities at Lubango. At that time she had quit SWAPO and joined the opposition party Congress of Democrats (CoD). In 2007, Dempers was part of a controversy as a member of the CoD's central committee. She and other committee members were expelled by a faction of the party led by Ben Ulenga. She joined up with the faction led by Ignatius Shixwameni and formed an 'interim national committee'.

In March 2008, close friend and fellow detainee Kalla Gertze died from an asthma attack. In eulogising Gertze, Dempers called for members of the National Assembly to open the debate on the Lubango detainees.
