= Jacob Manasseh =

Ottoman rabbi (1762–1832)

Ḥakham Jacob Manasseh

Personal life
- Born: 1762
- Died: 21 April 1832 (aged 69–70) Salonica, Ottoman Empire

Religious life
- Religion: Judaism
- Yahrtzeit: 21 Nissan 5592

Raphael Jacob Manasseh (Hebrew: רפאל יעקב מנשה, romanized: Refaʼel Yaʻaḳov Menasheh; 1762 – 21 April 1832) was an Ottoman rabbinical writer and chief rabbi of Salonica. Among his works are Ohel Ya'aḳob (Salonica, 1832), an alphabetical collection of the laws of religion; Be'er ha-Mayim (Salonica, 1836), responsa; and 'En ha-Mayim (printed in 1858), a commentary on the Shulchan Aruch and Yoreh De'ah.

== Publications ==
- Ohel Ya'aḳob. Salonica. 1832.
- Be'er ha-Mayim'. Salonica. 1836.
- 'En ha-Mayim. Salonica. 1858.
