= Exit (musician) =

- Birth name: David Shikalepo
- Also known as: Exit Rockaz
- Born: 7 April 1989 (age 35); Oshakati, South West Africa
- Genres: Kwaito, Hip hop, House
- Occupation(s): musician, producer
- Instrument(s): Vocals, keyboards, drums
- Years active: 2007–present
- Labels: Rockaz
- Website: https://instagram.com/exitrockaz

David Shikalepo (born 9 April 1989), popularly known by his stage name as Exit, is a Namibian musician. He is considered as a kwaito artist. Moreover, he was awarded the best kwaito and male artist of the year at Namibians Annual Music Awards (NAMAs) awards in the year 2018.

David Shikalepo was part of the award-winning Kwaito group Exit and Mushe, he has since taken up a solo career. His music is enjoyed internationally, in countries such as South Africa, Botswana, Angola, Zambia and Zimbabwe. He is the owner of the Rockaz Productions a record label and the associated Rockaz Clothing.

In 2015, David Shikalepo known as Exit, launched his sixth solo album titled 'Black is Boss' at Ongwediva.

== Early life and musical career ==
David Shikalepo was born in Oshakati, Exit grew up in Oshakati, attending school in and around that vicinity from lower primary until he finished his high school career with exceptional grades. In 2007 he moved to Windhoek to pursue his Media Arts degree at the University of Namibia where he met Mushe, an experienced, local producer/artist with a studio in Katutura. Exit joined Mushe's "2-tight" Hip-Hop crew and they set off to work on some potential classics – Exit and Mushe was born.

Exit'n Mushe changed their genre from pure hip hop to a fusion of hip hop and Kwaito, creating a unique sound that warmed fans the country-over. Their first performance was at the annual Ongwediva Trade Fair in the northern town of Ongwediva. They landed under the management of Blend Productions and within weeks they were in demand, performing at various events, sharing the stage with established artists such as PDK, Gazza, The Dogg, Killa B, Max, D-naff, Gal level, Sunny Boy, Phura just to mention a few. They also wowed the crowds at Max's and PDK's CD launches, both at Bernie's Entertainment Park in Ongwediva. Their combination video for the singles "(Olye ekulonga) Okwiimba"; and "Lets get down to business" are receiving major air-play on Namibia's leading TV stations. Another one of their singles, "Oka-styla" is burning up the hearts of many fans country-wide.

David Shikalepo was recently appointed Namibia's Gender-Based Violence ambassador, a role that aims to sensitize man against the prevailing gender-based violence in Namibia, working along with the Monica Gender Violence Solution.

== Awards ==
=== NAMA AWARDS ===
Year	Nominee / work	Award	Result
2013	Exit Rockaz	Most Disciplined Artist of the Year	Won
2018	CUM LAUDE	Male Artist of the year	Nominated
2019	Exit Rockaz	Bes Kwaito	Won
2019	Exit Rockaz	Best Male Artist of the year	Won

2020 Kwaito Artist of the year Result Nominated
