= Big Ben Kandukira =

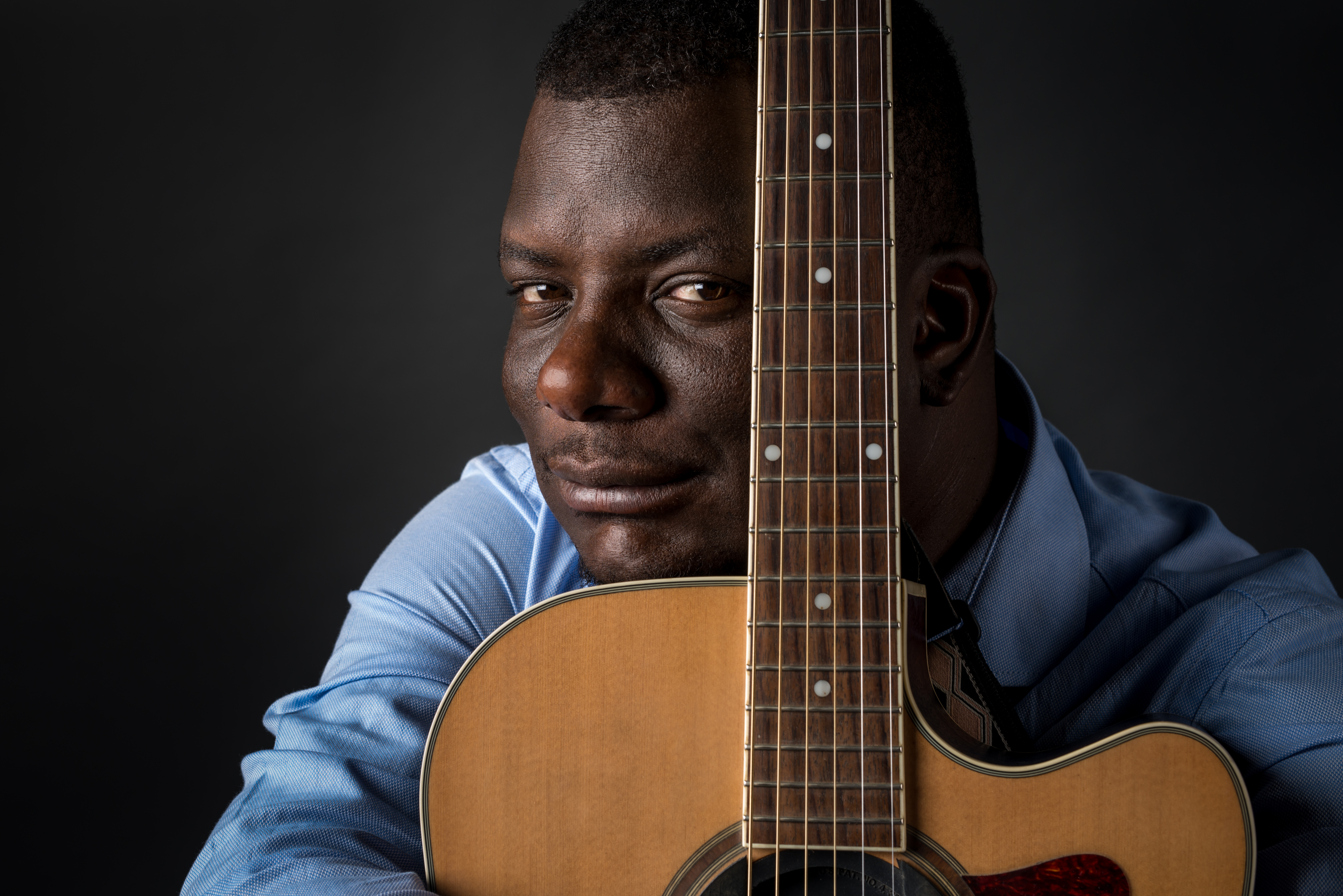

Background information
- Born: Venaune Kandukira; 12 December 1978 (age 47); Omutiuanduko, Erongo Region, South West Africa
- Genres: Afrobeat, Afropop, fusion
- Occupations: Singer, songwriter, performing artist, producer
- Instruments: Guitar
- Years active: 2001–present
- Website: www.okinikini.com

Big Ben Kandukira (born Venaune Ben Kandukira) is a Namibian performing and recording artist, songwriter, and producer.

Since his debut in 2001, Kandukira's work has focused on Afro pop, Afrobeat, and fusion genres characterized by tribal rhythms, melodies, and local languages. He is widely regarded as one of Namibia's top live music performers and has headlined major national festivals as well as international stages in Europe and North America.

As of 2024, Kandukira has released ten studio albums and one compilation of re-recorded hits.

== Career ==
Kandukira's debut album, Don't Bother (2001), was recorded at the Namibian Broadcasting Corporation's studios and featured songs in both Otjiherero and English. He gained significant prominence with his 2008 release, Moro Moro, which included the hit title track. Two songs from this album were selected for the international compilation Africa Meets Hip Hop, Pop and Contemporary.

In 2011, the song "Social Avenue" won Best Jazz/Instrumental at the Namibian Annual Music Awards (NAMA). Following the release of six studio albums, Kandukira released First Collection in November 2013, a 14-track commemorative album. The release featured ten re-recorded versions of his most popular tracks from his first six albums, alongside four brand-new singles: "1000 Tears", "The Crazy Dance", "Ekaku", and "Mbatondjala".

His 2015 album, Back to the Basics, earned two NAMA awards, including Male Artist of the Year. The track "Ovombo," which utilized the traditional Omuhiva style of the Ovaherero people, won the Best Traditional category.

=== International touring and advocacy (2024–2026) ===
In 2024, Kandukira embarked on an international tour titled the "American Musical Odyssey," performing in New York and the Pacific Northwest, followed by a headlining show in Gloucester, United Kingdom, in August 2024.

Kandukira has been a consistent headliner at the Windhoek Jazz Festival, Namibia's premier music event. In 2013, he was selected to open for South African jazz legend Hugh Masekela and performed alongside Zahara. The following year, he shared the main stage with Malian musician Salif Keita and the South African fusion band Freshlyground. His 2017 performance at the festival saw him co-headlining with Ringo Madlingozi and the trio Mi Casa.

Beyond performance, Kandukira is a leading advocate for the Namibian creative industry. In June 2024, he publicly supported a motion in the National Assembly calling for 80% local content quotas in Namibian media, arguing that such measures are essential for the economic sustainability of local artists.

In 2025, he focused on social advocacy through music, releasing "Stranger Danger" (Ndjivatereye), a song promoting child safety awareness, and "Calling Your Name Again," a tribute to Namibia's Founding Father, Sam Nujoma.

== Discography ==
=== Studio albums ===
- Don't Bother (2001)
- Big Ben (2003)
- Untitled / Big Ben (Self-titled, 2005)
- Moro Moro (2008)
- Natango (2010)
- Social Avenue (2011)
- Back to the Basics (2015)
- 102 (2018)
- Let The Music Play (2024)

=== Compilations and singles ===
- First Collection (Compilation, 2013)
- "Kukut" (Single, 2021)
- "Love and Respect" (Single, 2022)
- "Uundjisa" (Single, 2023)
- "Leader of the Brave" (Single, 2024)
- "Calling Your Name Again" (Single, 2025)
- "When It Rains" (Single, 2025)
- "Stranger Danger" (Ndjivatereye) (Single, 2025)
- "Kaira" (Single, 2025)

== Achievements ==
=== Competitions ===
- 2007: Best Live Performer of the Year, /Ae //Gams Arts and Cultural Festival
- 2013: Second Place, Last Band Standing Competition

=== Awards ===
- 2013: NAMA Best Jazz/Instrumental – "Social Avenue"
- 2015: NAMA Best Song with a Message – "Africa Penduka"
- 2016: NAMA Best Traditional – "Ovombo"
- 2016: NAMA Best Male Artist of the Year
