= Bience Gawanas =

Namibian lawyer

Bience Philomina Gawanas
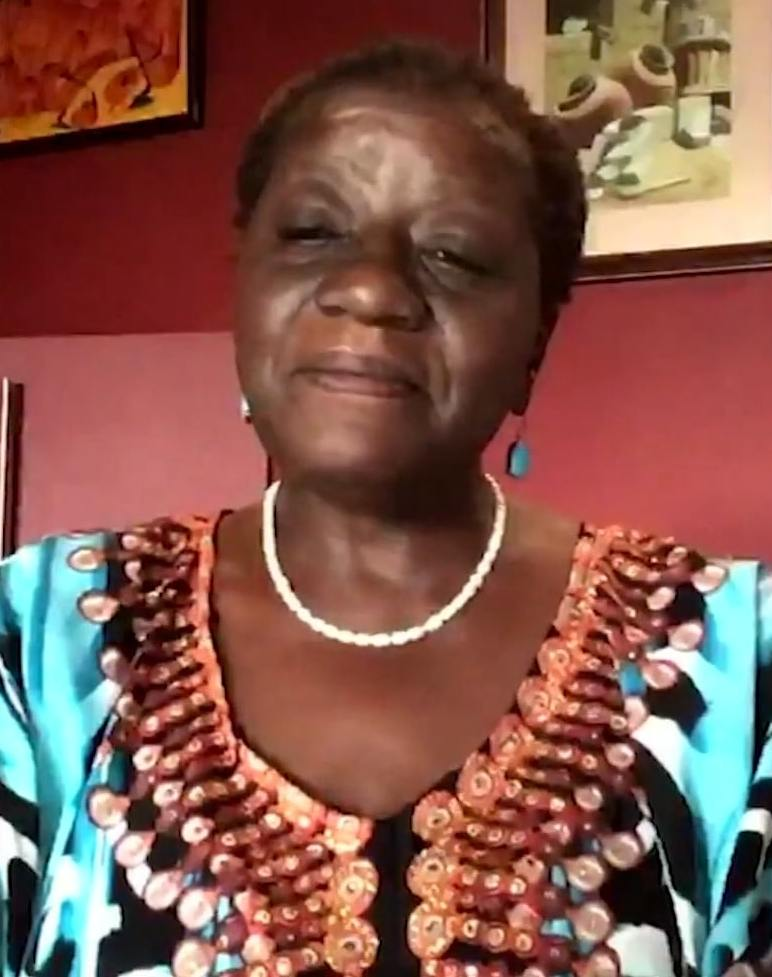
- Gawanas in 2021

Under-Secretary-General of the United Nations

Personal details
- Born: 1956 (age 69–70) Namibia
- Party: SWAPO

Bience Philomina Gawanas (born 1956) is a Namibian lawyer who served as Special Adviser on Africa for the United Nations from 2018 to 2020. She is Chancellor of the University of Warwick, her British alma mater.

From 2002 to 2012 Gawanas served as Commissioner for Social Affairs at the African Union Assembly of Heads of State and Government. She was a Commissioner on the Public Service Commission in Namibia from 1991 to 1996, and an ombudswoman in the Government of Namibia from 1996 to 2003. She served as a lecturer in Gender Law at the University of Namibia, Director of the Board of the Bank of Namibia (the country's central bank). She was involved in many non-governmental organizations including Secretary-General of the Namibian National Women's Organization and patron of Namibian Federation of Persons with Disabilities. As Chairperson of the Law Reform and Development Commission, she oversaw the passage of the Married Persons' Equality Act. The commission also did extensive work on Rape Acts and other important laws that were eventually passed after her time.

== Early life and education ==
Bience is the daughter of Philemon Gawanab and Hilde Rheiss. She attended secondary school at St Theresa Catholic school in Tses, ǁKaras Region, in what was then South West Africa, at a time when the school was becoming increasingly political. From Tses she went to University of the Western Cape (UWC) in Cape Town, South Africa, to study law; Catholic sponsors helped her resist the pressure of apartheid officials to switch careers from law to nursing. She was expelled from UWC after the Soweto uprisings in 1976.

After her expulsion she returned to Namibia, joined the SWAPO Youth League, and worked as a teacher. She then went into exile and lived in Zambia, Angola and Cuba. In 1981 the International Labour Organization sponsored her as an intern at their headquarters and subsequently on a labour law study. She moved to the United Kingdom to pursue a law degree at University of Warwick, sponsored by the Africa Educational Trust. She graduated in 1987 and qualified as a barrister at Lincoln's Inn, London the following year.

Namibia was occupied illegally by South Africa until 1990. "When I decided to study law, a white schools inspector told me that as a black child my intelligence was lower than that of a white child and that maybe law was not meant for me," she said to one interviewer. "Today I am a lawyer and I have proved that intelligence has got nothing to do with a person's colour."

Gawanas's interest in law was sparked after her beloved elder brother Jeka was picked up by whites and beaten to death while hitch-hiking, and police decided it was a "road accident". Her practical training included work with Lord Tony Gifford on human rights cases such as the "Birmingham Six" appeal of alleged bombers who were later exonerated. Throughout her exile, Gawanas continued to campaign for Namibia's freedom from South African rule.

In 1988 she travelled to Zambia to visit her daughter and was detained by SWAPO, the organisation she had previously supported. Over an extended period the movement detained many thousands of Namibians as part of a "spy scare". These allegations were never proved despite months of solitary confinement and torture. Gawanas later became one of the first Namibians to return alive from the Lubango dungeons, Southern Angola, in 1989, some months before many other surviving detainees were released. By July 1989, she and her daughter were repatriated by the United Nations and were back on Namibian soil.

== Career ==
=== Early beginnings ===
Her first job back in Namibia from exile was with advocate Anton Lubowski, which ended when apartheid agents murdered Lubowski on his front doorstep in an unsuccessful attempt to destabilize the 1989 UN-supervised elections. She then worked as with the public-interest Legal Assistance Centre until 1991.

=== Career in public service ===
Gawanas was appointed by Parliament to the Public Service Commission of Namibia. Her work there included extensive rebalancing of the Namibian civil service. President Sam Nujoma appointed her Ombudsman, on recommendation of the Judicial Services Commission, in 1996 and she served there, investigating and resolving complaints of maladministration at all levels, until 2003. She also served as Executive Secretary of the African Ombudsman Association.

In July 2003 Gawanas was elected by the African Heads of State as Commissioner of Social Affairs for the African Union Commission, based in Addis Ababa, Ethiopia. In that capacity, she sought to increase the profile of social development issues on the continental agenda. She was elected for two terms, in 2003 and 2008, and after completing her second term in October 2012, she returned to Namibia where she became Special Advisor to the Minister of Health and Social Services.

In addition to her government work, Gawanas served on the High-Level Task Force for the International Conference on Population and Development – co-chaired by Joaquim Chissano and Tarja Halonen – from 2012 to 2014. She was also part of the UNAIDS Global Task Team on Improving AIDS Coordination Among Multilateral Institutions and International Donors; the Task Force for Scaling-Up of Education and Training of Health Workers; the Global Commission on HIV and the Law; the Commission on Accountability and Information on Women’s and Children’s Health; the Global Steering Committee on Universal Access; the Commission on Accountability and Information on Women and Children’s Health; and the Lancet-University of Oslo Commission on Global Governance for Health.

=== Career at the United Nations ===
In January 2018 Gawanas was appointed Special Adviser on Africa for the United Nations by UN Secretary‑General António Guterres. She served at the level of Under-Secretary-General.

=== University of Warwick ===
In October 2024, Gawanas was appointed as the chancellor of the University of Warwick in the United Kingdom (UK).

== Other activities ==
- Global Fund to Fight AIDS, Tuberculosis and Malaria, Vice-Chair of the Board (since 2023)
- World Bank/WHO Global Preparedness Monitoring Board (GPMB), Member (since 2022)
- International Planned Parenthood Federation (IPPF), Member of the Board of Trustees (since 2020)
- Henley Business School, Member of the Strategy Board

== Personal life ==
Gawanas is the aunt of politician Sade Gawanas.

== Awards ==
The University of the Western Cape awarded her a Doctor legum honoris causa at their September 2012 graduation ceremony. Her country honoured her with the Most Brilliant Order of the Sun, first class, for her distinguished service above the call of duty, with the award presented in August 2024 by President Nangolo Mbumba.
