= Top Cheri =

Namibian singer, entrepreneur and author

TopCheri
- Born: Monica Pineas; 1 August 1991 (age 34); Walvis Bay
- Occupations: Musician, Author
- Years active: 2014 - present

Monica Pineas, commonly known as TopCheri (born 1 August 1991 in Walvis Bay), is a Namibian singer and entrepreneur.

== Early life ==
Born and raised in Walvis Bay, Top Cheri was studying TV Production at the College of the Arts, Windhoek. She was in her second year when her sister died, an entrepreneur and author from Walvis Bay and her only source of support. As a consequence, Top Cheri quit her studies and entered the music industry.

== Musical career ==
Top Cheri initially performed in German. She has won several SANLAM and MTC Awards. Her most recent was the Namibian song of the year in August 2020.

== Projects ==
The 'Omapendafule' hitmaker came up with an event, which was slated for 3 December 2022 at the Doc Jubber fields in Olympia, Windhoek, which was a platform for young children to showcase their talent in singing, dancing, and acting. The event aimed at encouraging young people to become entrepreneurs, through the addition of stalls.

In addition to her upcoming album launch 'Fertile', Top Cheri had also been laying the groundwork for a new project which saw her giving back to the community. “I want people to look at cancer and see the real urgency behind it. People are dying every day but in some of our communities some of our people take it as witchcraft and by the time doctors get involved, it's too late.” The cause is certainly close to her heart. “My mom had cancer, my best friend's mother died from cancer, I've seen it and what it does to people.” The cancer awareness project was launched at the album shower where Top Cheri encouraged her peers in attendance to also get involved.

== Discography ==
- Ghetto Love (2021)
- Tithe (2020)
- The Matrimony (2019)
- Dual (2021)
- Fertile (2022)
