= Kovambo Nujoma =

Namibian political figure (born 1933)

First Lady of Namibia
- In role 21 March 1990 – 21 March 2005
- President: Sam Nujoma
- Preceded by: Role created
- Succeeded by: Penehupifo Pohamba

Personal details
- Born: Kovambo Theopoldine Katjimune Mushimba; 10 March 1933 (age 92) Windhoek
- Political party: SWAPO
- Spouse: Sam Nujoma (m. 1956; died 2025)
- Children: 4, including Utoni
- Relatives: Aaron Mushimba (brother)

Kovambo Theopoldine Katjimune Nujoma (née Mushimba; born 10 March 1933) is a Namibian political figure and former First Lady of Namibia.

Nujoma, who is the widow of former president Sam Nujoma, was the inaugural First Lady of Namibia for 15 years from the country's creation in 1990 until 2005. She has been nicknamed the "Mother of the Nation".

== Biography ==
Nujoma was born in Windhoek on 10 March 1933, as the daughter of Johannes and Kandorera Mushimba. Her siblings included Aaron Mushimba, a businessman and SWAPO pro-independence figure.

She married Sam Nujoma on 6 May 1956. They had three sons and one daughter: Utoni Daniel (born 1952), John Ndeshipanda (1955–1993), Sakaria "Zacky" Nujoma (born 1957) and Nelago Nujoma (born 1959), who died at 18 months while her husband was in exile.

In 1960, during South West African rule, Nujoma was put under house arrest together with her brother, Aaron Mushimba. She was accused when her husband left to Angola in 1960, of planning to join him in exile at Angola and for that reason she was approached and raided by the South African security forces who tried to persuade her to kill her husband.

Kovambo Nujoma became the inaugural First Lady of Namibia upon the country's establishment on 21 March 1990. She was First Lady for three terms, until President Sam Nujoma retired from office on 21 March 2005.

== Awards ==
Kovambo Nujoma was conferred the Most Brilliant Order of the Sun, First Class on Heroes' Day (26 August) in 2014.

== Recognitions ==
In Walvis Bay, a street was named after her in the southwest of the town. A community hall in Windhoek was also named after her, now known as the Kovambo Nujoma Community Hall.
