= Theuns Jordaan =

South African singer-songwriter (1971–2021)

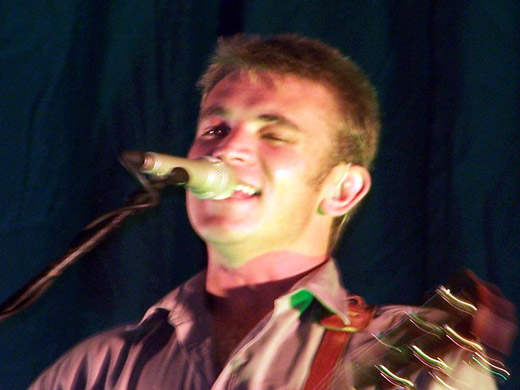

Background information
- Born: 10 January 1971; Venterstad, South Africa
- Died: 17 November 2021 (aged 50) Pretoria, South Africa
- Occupations: Singer, songwriter
- Years active: 1992–2021

Theuns Jordaan (10 January 1971 – 17 November 2021) was a South African singer-songwriter.

== Biography ==
Jordaan was born on 10 January 1971 on a Karoo farm near Venterstad in the Eastern Cape. While studying industrial psychology at the University of Stellenbosch, he had his first performance on 21 October 1992 at a local bar called The Terrace. He started composing his own lyrics, resulting in five songs of his debut album, Vreemde Stad. Theuns attended Volkskool High School in Graaff-Reinet in the Eastern Cape. While at school, Std 9 and matric he played music and sang to local patrons at a pizza restaurant/ pub called Trail in.

After he completed his studies, Jordaan spent a year as an entrepreneur. In October 1998, he moved from the Cape to Pretoria and, after gaining popularity in the city, recorded his debut album, Vreemde Stad, in Stellenbosch. This album was released in 2000 at the Klein Karoo Nasionale Kunstefees in Oudtshoorn. EMI released Vreemde Stad shortly afterwards, and the album surpassed triple platinum status (150,000 copies) in July 2003.

He launched his second album, Tjailatyd at the Aardklop music festival in 2002, which also sold more than 150,000 records. The South African guitar player, Anton L'Amour, performed with Theuns and was responsible for all the guitar tracks in Vreemde Stad and Tjailatyd.

== Personal life ==
Jordaan is said to have a daughter, born in 2009, about whom he found out about months after the birth, and the mother is a Namibian woman.

Jordaan died on 17 November 2021, after being diagnosed with leukemia in September 2020. He was laid to rest in Pretoria on 26 November 2021.

== Music ==
Jordaan's singing was characterized by his deeply emotive bass voice. His music has been said to be "faintly bluesly, radio-friendly", with his lyrics "infused with a mournful love of South Africa".

== Discography ==
- Vreemde stad (1999)
- Tjailatyd (2002)
- Seisoen (2005)
- Kouevuur (2009)
- Roeper (2012)
- Tribute to the poets (2014)
- Agter Slot en Grendel (2020)
