= Kaipkire =

Female 18th century Namibian warrior

- Occupations: Warrior, resistance leader
- Known for: Leading resistance against British slave traders in 18th-century Namibia
- Honors: Celebrated in the United Nations Security Council (2000) as a symbol of women's peace and security efforts

Kaipkire was a female warrior of the Herero people of Southern Africa in the 18th century.

Kaipkire, the queen of Bantu peoples, fought for Namibian freedom from enslavement and European colonialism. In 1903, she echoed the South African Khoikhoi in demonizing German occupiers of Namibia and led resistance forces against British slave traders. and is celebrated among the Herero people. She is known in Namibia as a "legendary woman of resistance against the slave trade,''
