= Monica Geingos =

First Lady of Namibia (2015-2024)

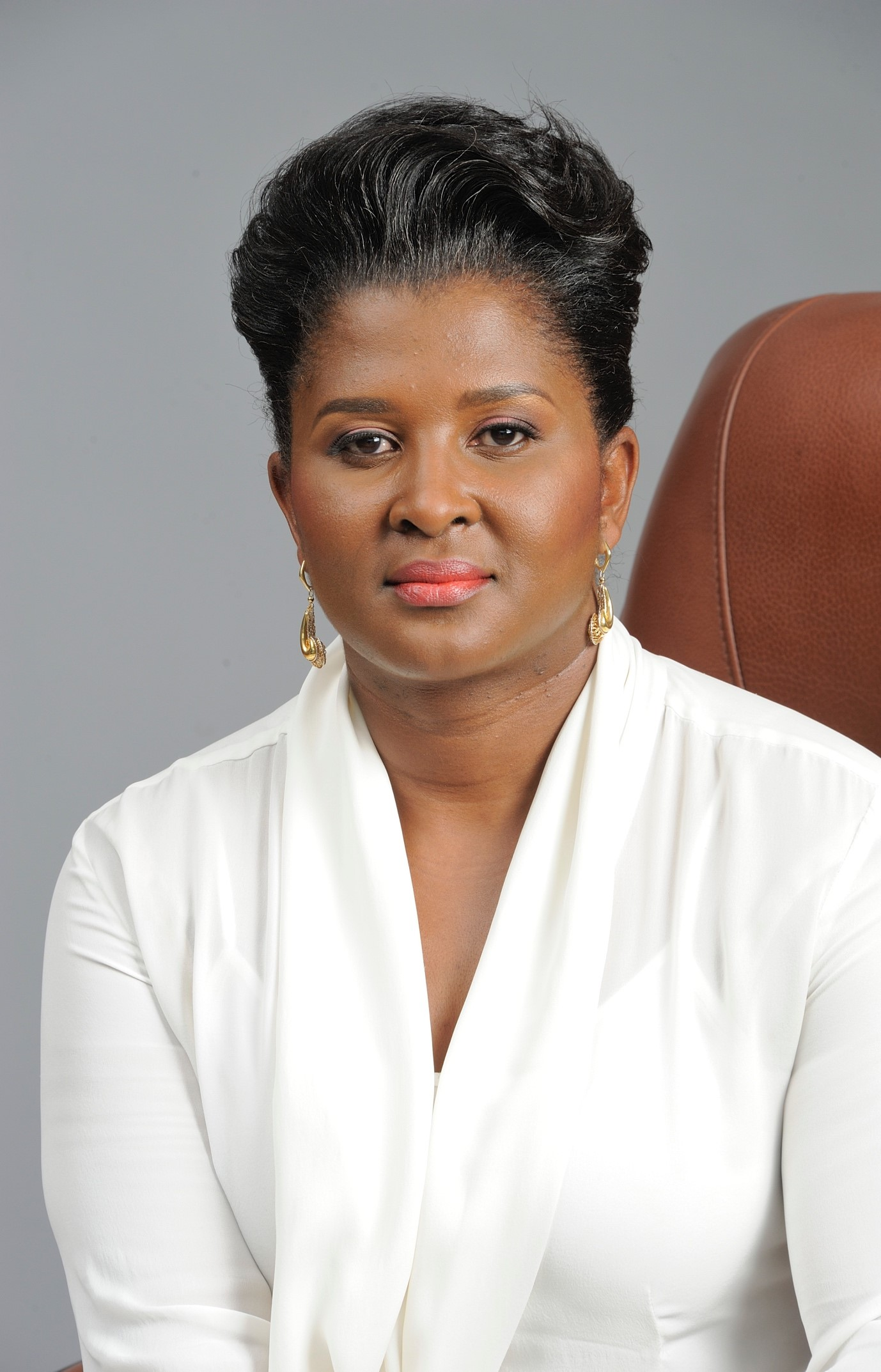
- Geingos in 2021

First Lady of Namibia
- In role 21 March 2015 – 4 February 2024
- President: Hage Geingob
- Preceded by: Penehupifo Pohamba
- Succeeded by: Sustjie Mbumba

Personal details
- Born: Monica Kalondo; 15 November 1976 (age 49) Ondonga, South West Africa (present-day Namibia)
- Party: SWAPO
- Spouse: Hage Geingob (m. 2015; died 2024)
- Children: 2
- Education: University of Namibia
- Occupation: Businesswoman
- Profession: Lawyer
- Website: https://www.oneeconomyfoundation.com/

Monica Geingos (née Kalondo; born 15 November 1976) is a Namibian entrepreneur and lawyer who served as the 3rd First Lady of Namibia from 2015 until her husband died in 2024. She has been a board member and director within many of the country's large companies. She also chaired the Presidential Economic Advisory Council. She was the President of the Organisation of African First Ladies for Development. The former first lady of Namibia now serves as the Chancellor of Kepler College in Kigali, Rwanda and is the founder of One Economy Foundation.

== Career ==
Geingos holds B.Juris and LLB degrees and has spent years as a private equity and governance expert in the financial sector.

In 2012, she was voted one of Namibia's 12 most influential people, and in 2020 she was on the list of 100 most influential African women. Geingos is a graduate of the University of Namibia and spent the early part of her career working for the Namibia Stock Exchange (NSX) in Windhoek. Geingos served as chairman of the board of eBank Namibia and is the managing director of the financial undertaking Stimulus, and general director of Point Break.

In 2025 Geingos was the chair of the board of the Ellen Johnson Sirleaf Presidential Center in Liberia.

== Personal life ==
Geingos married the then president-elect of Namibia, Hage Geingob, on 14 February 2015, shortly before he was sworn into office. She served as First Lady from 21 March 2015 until 4 February 2024, when Geingob died. At Geingob's funeral, Geingos gave a eulogy.

‘Lead From Where You Are: The Journey of the Office of the First Lady (2015–2024)’ was screened in 2025.

== Awards ==
Geingos was awarded the Dream Up, Speak Up, Stand Up Award, she is the third First Lady to receive the Award She was also awarded World Without AIDS Award from the German AIDS Foundation.

Geingos received an honorary doctorate degree from the University of Johannesburg in South Africa on the 16 March 2026. This was due to her work in health promotion, which earned her international recognition and influence within the global health space.

== Legacy ==
A school in Otjiwarongo, Monica Geingos Junior Secondary School is named after Mrs. Geingos. A street, Monica Geingos Street in Mondesa, Swakopmund is also named after her.
