= Christi Warner =

Christi N. Warner
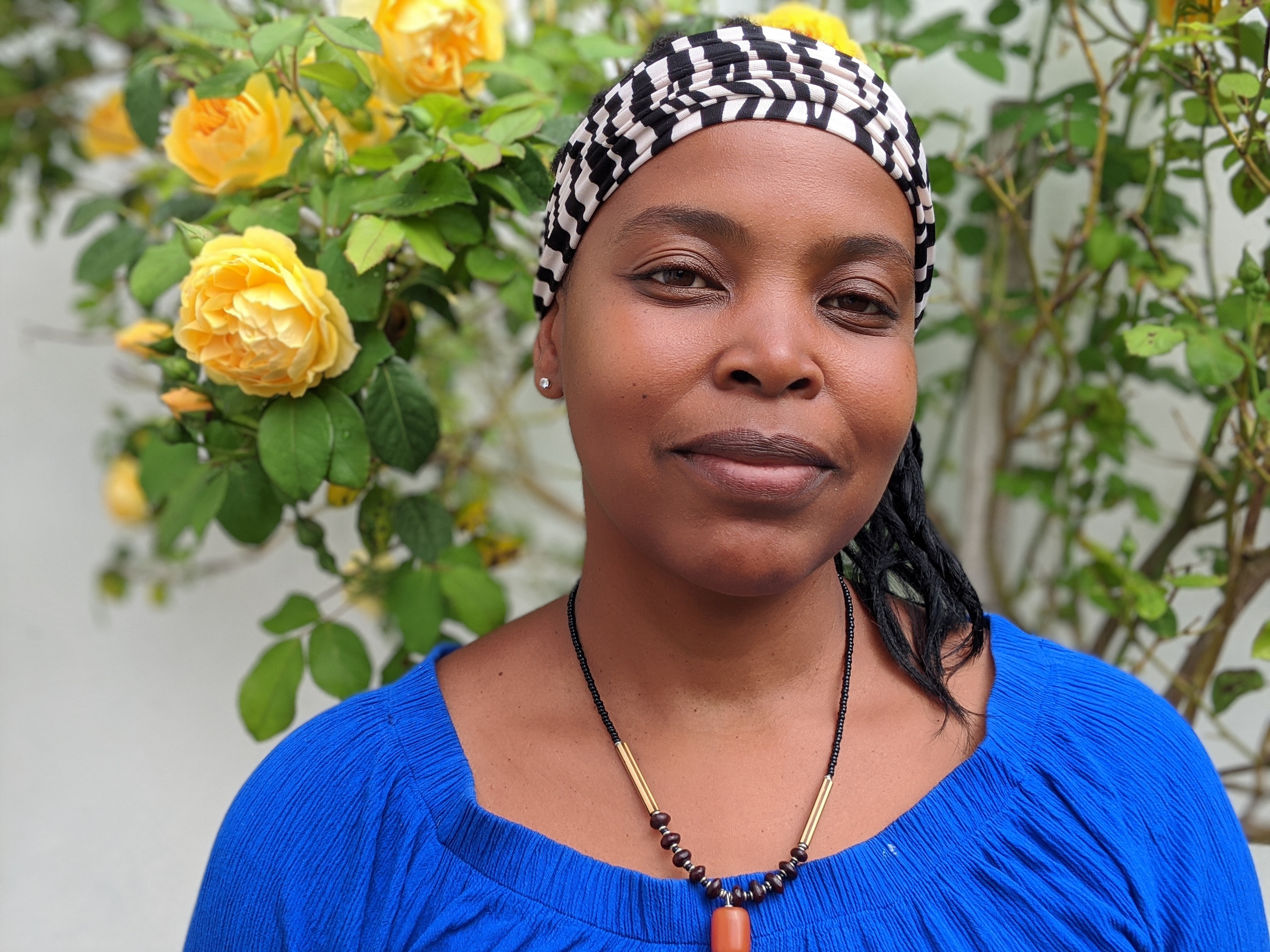

Background information
- Also known as: Lady Makhosa, Babatjie
- Born: Christi Nomath Warner; Windhoek, Khomas Region, Namibia
- Genres: R&B, soul
- Occupations: Singer, songwriter, poet, theatre for development practitioner, freelance journalist
- Years active: 1995–present
- Label: Red Vandalz Entertainment 2001–2004, Afrochica Entertainment 2005–present
- Website: Christi Warner

Christi Warner is a British Namibian-born R&B singer, songwriter, poet, theatre for development practitioner and freelance journalist for the New Era ArtLife.

== Career ==
Warner is probably best known for her role as television presenter "Lady Makhosa" on Soul Makhosa, a Namibian music video show broadcast on NBC television in 2003.

Early on in her music career she teamed up with Bolie Mootseng, T.C. (member of the Kalaharians) and Stoopie to collaborate on the song "On a Sunday Afternoon". Although her vocals can be heard throughout the song, she and the other collaborators were not credited. The only artist recognised for the hit song was Boli Mootseng. It was only in 2001, when she became a group member and producer of the R&B group X-Plode featuring members Jaicee James and Lizell Swartz, that she became known in the Namibian music industry.

Today Warner "has carved a niche as an indigenous Namibian poet, able to stand shoulder to shoulder with her male counterparts".

In May 2008, Warner released her debut album, I Found My Rhythm.

== Early life ==
Warner was born in Windhoek, Namibia, to a single mother with Liberian ancestry. Her mother, Margareth Warner, was a fashion model in her younger days, and worked for Air Namibia before retiring.

Warner is the third of five children. At home, she is best known as Babatjie (Afrikaans), which means "Baby". She is fluent in Afrikaans, a language she uses with her Namibian family. Although born in Windhoek, she spent most of her childhood in Oranjemund, Namibia, as her mother moved there with her step-father. She spent most of her secondary education in boarding schools in small towns such as Steinkopf, South Africa and Keetmanshoop, Namibia.

Warner began writing poetry when she was in primary school. Only after high school, she managed to share her words with people outside her family. She credits her French teacher at the Franco-Namibian Cultural Centre for helping her find a way into the world of poetry. "Her lecturer came across her notebook full of poems, and directed her to the Bricks Community Project".

== Personal life ==
Warner is married and lives in Oxford, UK.
