= Kanuni (hompa) =

Tribal leader in Namibia (c. 1900 – 1972)

Personal details
- Born: c. 1900
- Died: February 18, 1972 (aged 71–72)
- Profession: Politician, hompa

Kanuni (c. 1900 – February 18, 1972) was a hompa, or queen, of Kwangali in the Okavango region of Namibia. She is one of only two female hompas to have retained her traditional position during a period when tribal leadership was masculinized by the South African government.

Little is known of Kanuni's background, save that she was a member of the Kwangali royal clan. She became regent in 1923 after the death of the previous ruler, Kandjimi; she was not only his sister but also sister to the newly-chosen hompa, Mbuna, who died in an accident in 1926. Beginning in that year Kanuni began to rule under her own name, although some sources state instead that she became regent for another brother, Sivute, who was only a minor. It was at this time, in 1926, that she permitted the opening of a Roman Catholic mission station in Tondoro; in 1929, she allowed a Catholic mission school to be started at Nkurenkuru. Sivute, for his part, soon came to covet the throne, and began waging physical attacks on his sister's retinue while publicly undermining her. On one occasion, after hearing of an assault upon an attendant, Kanuni began to fight Sivute with a knobkerrie, eventually winning the day. Fearing for her life, however, she fled to what is today southern Angola. Sivute complained to senior policeman, Luben Manuere, who in turn handed off his reports to Native Commissioner Harold Eedes. The reports suggested that the Kwangali preferred a male ruler, and consequently in 1940 Eedes removed Kanuni from her position, replacing her with Sivute. Kanuni continued in exile, living in Siurungu, but was eventually invited by Eedes to join her brother at Musese. Harold Eedes died in 1958. Sivute did not enjoy good relations with either his people or the colonial administration, and with the administrator's death he was deposed. Kanuni returned to power, reigning until her death.

Kanuni was not popular with the South African authorities during her reign. Both Eedes and an earlier Native Commissioner, Roger Carr, felt that their difficulties in recruiting migrant labor from among the Kwangali were due in part to her gender; for her part she explained that young men of her district were afraid to travel to South Africa for work for a variety of reasons, not least their personal safety. She remains an important figure in the modern history of northern Namibia.
