= Merlin A. Ditmer =

American football and basketball coach (1886–1950)

Merlin Ditmer
Biographical details
- Born: April 9, 1886; Potsdam, Ohio, U.S.
- Died: March 10, 1950 (aged 63); Cincinnati, Ohio, U.S.
- Education: Otterbein

Coaching career (HC unless noted)

Football
- 1920–1926: Otterbein
- 1927–1940: Miami (OH) (assistant)

Basketball
- 1920–1925: Otterbein
- 1927–1941: Miami (OH) (assistant)

Administrative career (AD unless noted)
- 1941–1948: Miami (OH)

Head coaching record
- Overall: 13–37–4 (football); 6–25 (basketball)

Merlin Ammon Ditmer (April 9, 1886 – March 10, 1950) was an American football and basketball coach. He served as the head football coach (1920–1926) and head men's basketball coach (1920–1925) at Otterbein University in Westerville, Ohio. Ditmer moved to Oxford, Ohio to work an assistant football and basketball coach at Miami University before serving as the school's athletic director from 1941 to 1948.

== Head coaching record ==
=== Football ===
Year	Team	Overall	Conference	Standing	Bowl/playoffs
Otterbein Cardinals (Independent) (1920)
1920	Otterbein	1–7			
Otterbein Cardinals (Ohio Athletic Conference) (1921–1926)
1921	Otterbein	1–5–2	1–3–2	13th	
1922	Otterbein	2–6	2–6	15th	
1923	Otterbein	5–3	4–3	6th	
1924	Otterbein	2–5	2–5	T–15th	
1925	Otterbein	0–6–2	0–5–1	20th	
1926	Otterbein	2–5	1–5	18th	
Otterbein:		13–37–4	10–27–3		
Total:		13–31–4			
