= Penehupifo Pohamba =

Namibian politician and First Lady of Namibia (1948–2026)

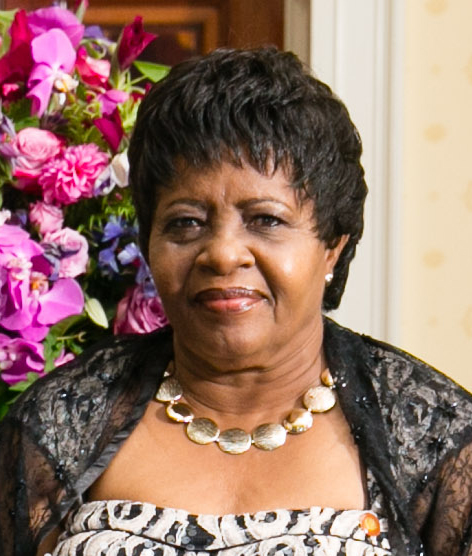
- Pohamba in 2014

2nd First Lady of Namibia
- In role 21 March 2005 – 21 March 2015
- President: Hifikepunye Pohamba
- Preceded by: Kovambo Nujoma
- Succeeded by: Monica Geingos

Personal details
- Born: 16 June 1948 Okatale, Ohangwena, South West Africa
- Died: 17 October 2026 (aged 78)
- Party: SWAPO
- Spouse(s): Malakias Shiluwa (deceased); Hifikepunye Pohamba
- Children: 5

Penehupifo "Penny" Pohamba (16 June 1948 – 17 October 2026) was a Namibian nurse and politician who served as the second First Lady of Namibia while her husband, Hifikepunye Pohamba, was President of Namibia from 2005 to 2015.

== Early life ==
Pohamba was born on 16 June 1948, in Okatale in Ohangwena Region, in the constituency of Oshikango close to the borders of Angola. Pohamba attended her primary and secondary school at Odibo with Jeremiah Nambinga and Joel Kaapanda. She was a school teacher at St. George's Diocesan School in Windhoek.

== Political career ==
Pohamba was a member of SWAPO. She married Malakias Shiluwa at St Mary's Odibo in 1969, and they have one son, Waldheim Shiluwa (born 1971). In 1976, she left Namibia via Angola and headed to Zambia. After a few months in Zambia, Pohamba was sent to Tanzania for medical training. She also received military training and worked in the camps where the refugees from Namibia were housed. She was then sent to Jamaica for a three-year period to study midwifery. Her husband (Malakias) was killed in a land mine explosion and by that time she had their daughter, Ndelitungapo Shiluwa (born 1973). She was sent back to Angola to practice her medical skills among her own people.

In August 1981, Pohamba was sent to East Germany to study politics at a college designed for Namibians. In 1983, she returned to Angola, where she married future President Hifikepunye Pohamba, and they had three children, Tulongeni (meaning "Let's work") (born 1986), Kaupumhote (meaning "In this world you will not finish the bad people") (born 1988) and Ndapanda (meaning "I'm grateful") (born 1991), who was born shortly after independence.

In her tenure as First Lady, Pohamba advocated for the empowerment of women to enable them to make a meaningful contribution to the development of society and fought for the eradication of violence and other forms of injustice against women. She was also active in supporting maternal and child health-care, and also in the fight against HIV/AIDS. In July 2006, Penehupifo Pohamba was elected vice-president for the Southern Africa Development Committee (SADC). She was a professional midwife after being trained in Tanzania and Jamaica. Before her husband became president, she practised as a midwife and registered nurse. She was also the patron of the Lady Pohamba Private Hospital (LPPH).

In 2005, Madame Pohamba helped to establish Organization for the Empowerment of Widows, widowers and orphans of HIV/AIDS in Namibia (OEWONA).

On Heroes' Day 2014 she was conferred the Most Brilliant Order of the Sun, First Class.

== Personal life and death ==
The Pohambas together owned farm Guinaspoh #41 near Otavi. She was a mother of five, of which two are boys and three girls.

Penehupifo Pohamba died on 17 October 2026, at the age of 78.

== Sources ==
=== Further reading ===
- http://myafrica.allafrica.com/view/people/main/id/08vheF1LZMkaZB5z.html
