= Lubango dungeons =

Namibian prisons in Angola in the 1980s

Lubango dungeons is a term used to describe the notorious killing and torture of SWAPO Party members and refugees by the party, accused of being spies of the South African colonial regime. About 1000 SWAPO members were incarcerate for over nine years in these dungeons. These atrocities were committed during the war of liberation struggle of Namibia in the 1980s at detention centre, others refer to it as SWAPO death camp in Lubango, Angola. Details of what occurred were published in a left wing journal, Searchlight South Africa, with an interview with two of those who had been kept in pits in horrific conditions.

There have been efforts to suppress this chapter of the liberation movement SWAPO in the discourse of contemporary Namibia's public history by the current government. It was alleged that the Namibian churches participated in the cover-up.

Some of the notable survivors of these atrocities include Bience Gawanas, Oiva Angula, Kalla Gertze, Sustjie Mbumba, Emma Kambangula, Ndapewa Sisingi Hiskia and Ulrich Jackson Paulino among others.

== Background ==
The South West Africa People Organisation (SWAPO) was recognised as a genuine national resistance movement against the apartheid colonial regime of South Africa from the 1960s until the independence in 1990. Thus, SWAPO was a primary caretaker of about 60 000 Namibians war refugees in exile that were accommodated mainly in camps. The term "camps" basically refers to the central areas where Namibians in exile were residing. The life in these camps has shaped the narrative of public history of Namibia's liberation struggle. The first camp for SWAPO was established in Kongwa, Tanzania, in the 1960s. In the 1970s SWAPO moved to establish various camps in Zamibia along the Namibian border to accommodate trained guerrillas that were to carry out attacks inside Namibia. When the Portuguese colonial regime weakened in Angola in 1974, that effect facilitated SWAPO in establishing a networks of camps in Angola. Those camps accommodated various Namibians fleeing the atrocities of the apartheid regime. SWAPO ruled these camps with stringent control that begins at moment of entry into the camp as well as living within the camp. The day-to-day life in the camps was designed in a way that inhabitants of those camps were required to follow the established rules, orders and routines. When individuals within the camp break the rules, they were disciplined in various ways such as detention and corporal punishment.
