= Quido =

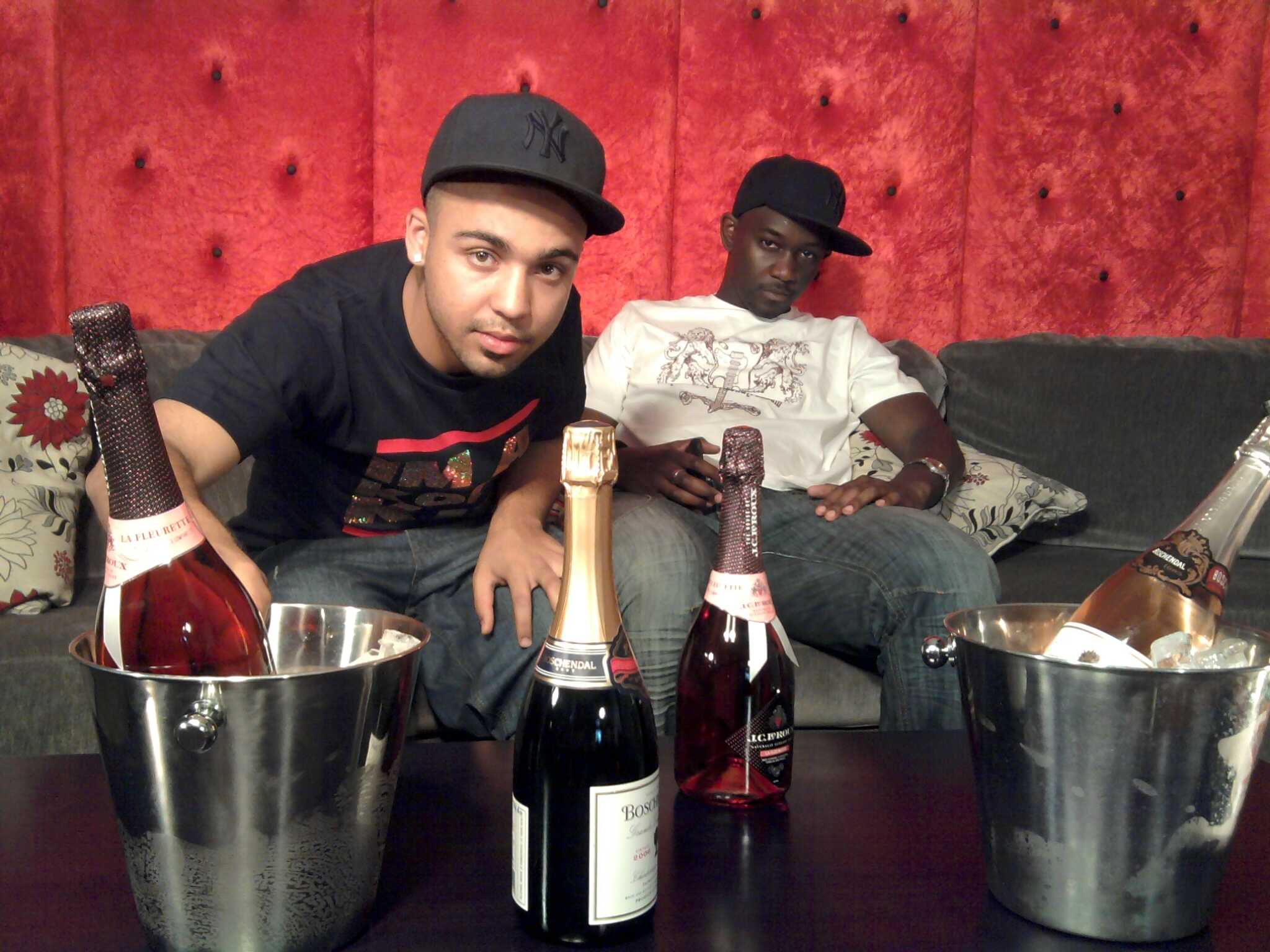
- Quido and Sinna G

Background information
- Also known as: Mandume
- Born: Le-Roy Quido Vladimir Mohamed; 16 August 1989 (age 36); Windhoek, South West Africa (now Namibia)
- Origin: Katutura, Namibia
- Genres: hip hop
- Occupations: rapper
- Years active: 2010–present
- Label: 061 Music

Le-Roy Quido Vladimir Mohamed (16 August 1989), who performs under the name Quido, is a Namibian rapper.

== Music career ==
Quido signed to the 061 Music label. Kanibal was initially the one that was eager to sign him to his Black Market label but had too many projects on his hands. He dropped his debut album in the last quarter of 2011.

== Discography ==
- 2011: Soweto Boi -Certified
- 2011: 061Music presents - The Compilation

=== Mixtapes ===
- 2010/2011: Who Is Quido?
- 2009: Hustlementals
- 2009: Illegitimate In Da Game
