= Gabi Schneider =

Namibian geologist

Gabi Schneider (born 1956, in Frankfurt am Main, Germany) is a Namibian geologist.

== Education ==
Schneider studied geology and mineralogy at Goethe University Frankfurt from 1974 to 1980. She obtained a Master of Science in economic geology and her PhD from the University of Frankfurt in 1980 and 1984 respectively.

== Professional career ==
Schneider worked as a senior geologist at the Geological Survey of Namibia in 1985 and was later appointed as its director in 1996. Her professional background includes economic and exploration geology, mineralogy, and geochemistry, as well as management and administration. She holds an honorary life membership with the Geological Society of Namibia and is a registered scientist with the South Africa Council for Natural Scientists.

== Leadership roles ==
Schneider was President of the Organisation of African Geological Surveys from 2013 to 2016 and Vice Chairperson of the Environmental Investment Fund of Namibia. She is a founding member of the Small Miners Association of Namibia.

Schneider is a member of the Natural Science Programme Committee of the Namibian National Committee for UNESCO and a senior advisor for UNESCO's Geopark Programme. She represents the African continent at the International Consortium of Geological Surveys and is chairing the Geology Advisory Board of the University of Namibia.

== Books authorship ==
Schneider authored books on Namibian Geology including The roadside geology of Namibia, Treasures of the Diamond Coast. A Century of Diamond Mining in. Namibia, Passage Through Time: the Fossils of Namibia; and co-authored Environment Awareness for Sustainable Development: A Resource Book for Namibia, published in 2017 (second edition 2021), ISBN 978-99945-79-89-1 (Namibia), 978-3-88795-514-4 (Germany).
