= Leevi Gerson Max =

Leevi Gerson Max (2 September 1935 in Rupara, Kavango, Namibia – 5 June 1997 in Windhoek, Namibia) was an Ovambo pastor in the service of the Evangelical Lutheran Church in Namibia. He was one of the founders of the labour movement in Namibia.

Max's father was Andonio Max Manuel, a lay preacher from Angola, and his mother was Rebekka Amupanda, a nurse. They had been sent to Rupara to assist Nurse Anna Rautaheimo in the founding of a clinic in Rupara. After a few years there, the family moved to Ovamboland, where Rebekka Amupanda was from, and then to Angola, to assist the Finnish missionary Tuure Vapaavuori, who needed an assistant there who could speak the local languages. When the Finns had to leave Angola in 1946, the family once again moved to Ovamboland.

The family settled down in the Engela mission station. Max went to school there, and after finishing school, he was admitted to the teacher training seminary in Ongwediva. Having graduated as a teacher, Max worked in the Ohalushu school near Engela, while continuing to live at home. At the time, he was engaged in the boys' club, Boy Scouts and the youth work of his home parish. His interest in learning new things led him to study to become a pastor, and he was ordained a minister in 1965. The same year he married Nurse Kaunapawa Kristian, who had worked for a couple of years as a missionary among the San.

The Ovambo-Kavango Church decided to send Max to work with Ovambo migrant workers in the central and southern parts of the country. He was stationed in the town of Okahandja, where his co-worker, Finnish missionary Pauli Laukkanen also lived. They were to organize church work among the 40,000 Ovambos working in diaspora outside of Ovamboland. The Apartheid laws of the country made this work quite difficult at times.

Max was always eager to engage himself in new projects. This led him to one of the founders of the trade union movement in Namibia, which got him into trouble with the South African government. In 1981 he was arrested and imprisoned in Windhoek as a communist agitator. He was later let out of jail and put under house arrest, but eventually he was allowed to continue his work among migrant workers, however, under close surveillance.

In 1987, Max moved to the United States in order to study theology there. He completed both a Master of Divinity and a Doctor of Theology degree. In his doctoral thesis, he examined Namibian theology of labour.

When he returned to Namibia, Max wanted to incorporate social awareness to the church's activities and a readiness to combat economical inequality. However, the Ovambo-Kavango Church was not ready to pursue these issues. Max was sent to Walvis Bay, to work as a pastor among the black population there. In 1996 Max was finally transferred to Windhoek, where his wife had been living since 1972.

In Windhoek, Max was installed as the pastor of the ELCIN parish, and he was also to act as a trainer in ELCIN urban work. He also became the chairman of the cooperation committee of the Lutheran churches of Namibia. However, he had only worked in these capacities for some two months, when he came down with a severe case of cerebral malaria, which caused his death on 5 June, 1997.

Max and his wife Kaunawapa did not have biological children, but they had three adoptive children.

Max visited Finland three times. He spent the year 1970 there with a scholarship from the Mikkeli Diocese of the Finnish Lutheran Church.

Max's colleague Paul Isak emphasized how eager Max was to pursue his calling. If he had conducted a service on a Sunday, he would be seen on the streets and private homes of his parishioners the next day, addressing his parishioners. A head of a men's dormitory in Walvis Bay said of him: "Max did not really differ from any us ordinary people, yet everyone had respect for him as a pastor."
