= Disability in Namibia =

According to the Namibia Statistics Agency based on the 2016 Inter-censal Demographic Survey, 5% of Namibia's population has varying degrees of disability.

== History ==
Namibia signed the Convention on the Rights of Persons with Disabilities on 25 April 2007 and ratified it on 14 December 2007. It went into effect on 3 May 2008.

== Categories ==
As of 2001, among all people with disabilities, 35% have a visual impairment, 27% have a mobility impairment which involve hands and legs, 21% have a hearing impairment, 11% have a speech impairment and 5% have a mental impairment.
