= Alexandre Bueno =

Brazilian footballer (1951 – 2019)

Personal information
- Full name: Alexandre de Gusmão Bueno
- Date of birth: 27 December 1951
- Place of birth: São Paulo, Brazil
- Date of death: 6 May 2019 (aged 67)
- Place of death: Santos, Brazil
- Position: Midfielder

Senior career*
Years	Team	Apps	(Gls)
1968–1969	Portuguesa Santista		
1970	Santos		
1971–1972	Botafogo-SP		
1973–1975	Guarani		
1976	Grêmio	50	(17)
1977–1978	Portuguesa		
1978	Botafogo-SP		
1979	Goiás	27	(3)
1979	Inter de Limeira		
1980	São Paulo	17	(0)
1980–1981	Atlético Goianiense	11	(3)
1981	CRB		
1981	São José-SP		
1981	Londrina		
1982–1983	Comercial-MS		
1983–1984	XV de Jaú		
1984	Juventus-SP		
1984	Comercial-MS		
1985	Botafogo-SP		
1986	Saltense		
1987	Botafogo-SP		
- * Club domestic league appearances and goals as of 16 October 2023

Alexandre Bueno (27 December 1951 – 6 May 2019), was a Brazilian professional footballer who played as a midfielder.

== Career ==
Alexandre played for numerous Brazilian football clubs, with most notable spells at São Paulo, where he was part of the 1980 Campeonato Paulista winner squad, and Grêmio.

== Honours ==
São Paulo

- Campeonato Paulista: 1980

== Death ==
Alexandre died on 6 May 2019 in Santos, victim of multiple organ failure.
