= Kalla Gertze =

Namibian politician

Reinhard "Kalla" Gertze (1960 – 13 March 2008) was a Namibian university lecturer and parliamentarian as a member of the Congress of Democrats (CoD) party. He was in the National Assembly from 2005 until his death in 2008 and had previously been a lecturer at the University of Namibia.

== Early life and exile ==
Gertze was born in 1960 in Otjimbingwe, Erongo Region. Gertze left for exile into Angola with SWAPO in 1978. He soon left for studies at the United Nations Institute for Namibia in Zambia and thereafter moved to France, where he earned a bachelor's degree and a teaching diploma. Gertze later returned to France and earned a Master of Arts degree in Linguistic Theories and Literature at the Metz University.

Along with hundreds of other Namibian exiles, Gertze was accused of having turned against the liberation movement SWAPO, and of spying on behalf of the South African oppressors. They were tortured and held in the 'dungeons' of Lubango in southern Angola. Gertze served 6 years in the Lubango dungeons. He also lectured at the University of Namibia.

== After Namibian independence ==
After returning to Namibia after independence, Gertze served as president of the Breaking the Wall of Silence (BWS) movement which worked for government recognition of past abuses of SWAPO detainees while in exile. An estimated 2,000 Namibians died in 5 prison camps run by SWAPO in the final years of the Namibian War of Independence. He also lectured at the University of Namibia.

Gertze became a founding member of the Congress of Democrats (CoD) and became its secretary-general in 2004. In 2005 he took up a seat in the National Assembly that he held until his death.

Gertze was married to Ria, the couple had five children. He died on 13 March 2008 in Windhoek from an asthma attack. He was eulogized by fellow detainee and friend Pauline Dempers who succeeded him as head of the BWS.
