= Ngeno Nakamhela =

Namibian Lutheran priest

Reverend Ngeno-Zach Nakamhela (born 24 April 1945 in Omundudu, Ohangwena Region) is a Namibian priest in the Evangelical Lutheran Church in Namibia (ELCIN). From 1992 to 1999, he played a prominent role in Namibian politics as General Secretary of the Council of Churches in Namibia (CCN). As head of the CCN, the Lutheran leader called for an end to the Namibia Defence Force's involvement in the Second Congo War. He was also active in campaign's for an end to domestic violence and promoting the rights of older people. In 2001, he became the pastor of an inner city congregation in Windhoek.

== Education ==
Nakamhela began studying theology in 1969 at the Paulinum Theological Seminary in Otjimbingwe, Erongo Region. During the years 1973–1986 he studied at the University of Amsterdam and Amsterdam Free University.
