= Havana (Windhoek suburb) =

Havana-Windhoek Havana informal settlement
- suburb
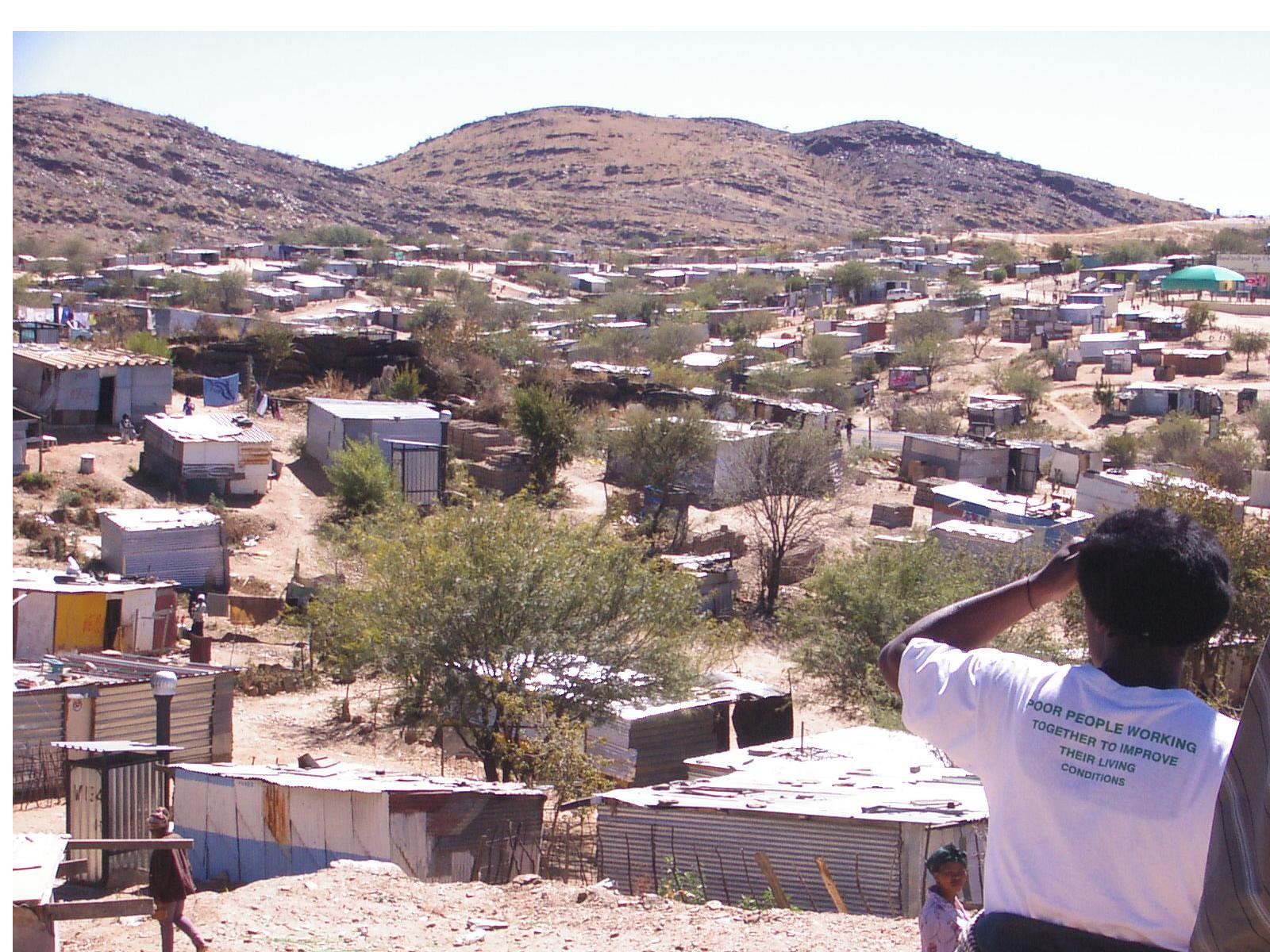
- Havana informal settlement

- Location within Namibia
- Coordinates: 22.5118832°S 17.0325749°E
- Country: Namibia
- Region: Khomas Region
- City: Windhoek, Namibia
- Named for: Capital city of Cuba

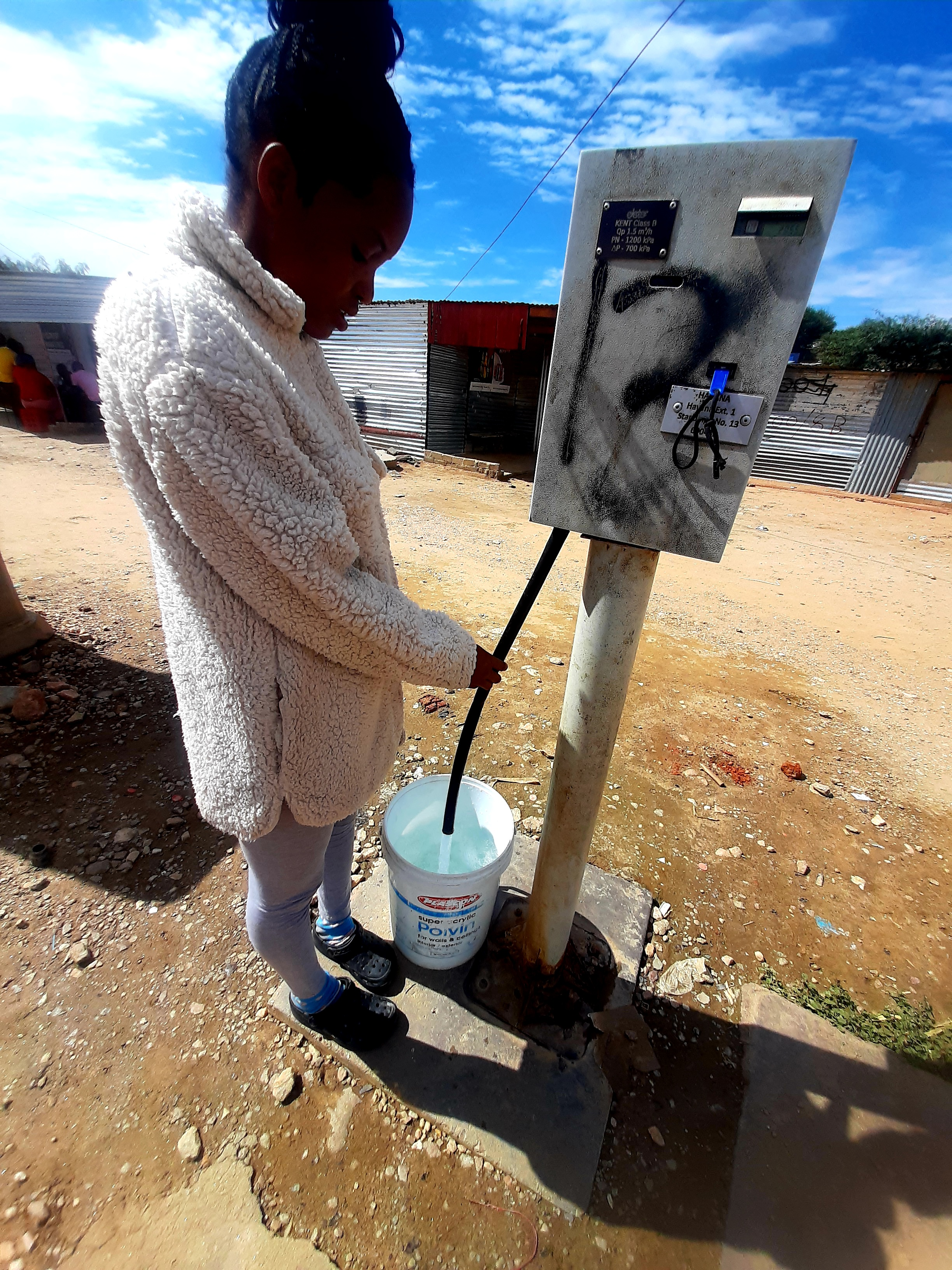
Drinking water supply

Havana is a suburb of Windhoek, the capital of Namibia. It is one of the most impoverished informal settlements in Windhoek. Havana is located northwest of Windhoek, in the Khomas region. It was named after the capital city of Cuba. It was established about two decades ago when the City of Windhoek experienced a high rate of urbanisation due to many people travelling to the capital city for a better way of living and for employment purposes.

== Locales ==
There are two schools in the area: Havana Secondary Project School and Havana Primary School. Havana Usave Shoprite is another notable place that exists in the area. There is also a dumping site in the Havana informal settlement.

== Way of life ==
Approximately 400 people living in this settlement do not own any land and they are renting. People from this area want their own land since they are living in overcrowded conditions, which robs them of their rights to live in a safe environment, as well as the right to health and protection. There is a scarcity of water electricity and few toilets in the settlement which people share. The residents of Havana have been living with water scarcity since a pre-paid water tap was damaged in mid-December 2018, which serves about 253 households in the area. Since there is no electricity in the area, residents connect the electricity illegally. "The Namibian" reported on Wednesday 2014 that about 150 illegal electrical connections in Havana were disconnected by the city of Windhoek.

== Worldplace ==
There is a well known worldplace in this suburb called Havana four way whereby many street vendors of Havana sell their goods. It's proposed that very soon the place will be provided with traffic lights.

== Crime rate ==
Havana is one of the settlements with a high crime rate. The settlement has a high crime rate partially because too many shacks and households lack electricity, thus making it easy for criminals to carry out their activities.
