= Nabot Manasse =

Nabot Manasse or Nabot Shiyoma (b. Ovamboland, Namibia — died 30 January 1958) was one of the first seven Ovambo pastors, whom the director of the Finnish Missionary Society, Matti Tarkkanen ordained into priesthood in Oniipa, Ovamboland, on 27 September 1925, with a permission granted by the Bishop of Tampere, Jaakko Gummerus.

The time of Manasse’s birth is not known. He was baptized on 25 December 1908.

Manasse went to the Oniipa seminary during 1922–1925. He worked in Onayena from 1925 to 1950 and from 1953 to 1958, and in Okankolo from 1950 to 1953.

Manasse was married twice, first to Helena yaKalunduka from 1909 until 1933, and later to Kristina kaNambuli from 1933 on. He had no children.

== Sources ==
- Peltola, Matti (1958). Sata vuotta suomalaista lähetystyötä 1859–1959. II: Suomen Lähetysseuran Afrikan työn historia [One Hundred Years of Finnish Missionary Work 1859–1959. II: The History of FMS's Missionary Work in Africa]. Helsinki: The Finnish Missionary Society.
- Pentti, Elias, ed. (1958). Ambomaa [Ovamboland]. Helsinki: Finnish Missionary Society.
- Nambala, Shekutaamba V. V. (1995). Ondjokonona yaasita naateolohi muELCIN 1925–1992 [‘Register of ELCIN Clergy 1925–1992’]. Oniipa, Namibia: ELCIN.
