= Aaron Mushimba =

Namibian businessman

Aaron Twapewa Johannes Mushimba (29 November 1946 – 31 August 2014) was a Namibian businessperson. Described as a business mogul, Mushimba was involved with the trading of diamonds. He was linked to Belgian American diamond merchant Maurice Tempelsman. He was the chairperson of a Namibian investment group, PE Minerals, which holds the mining rights to the Rosh Pinah mine in Namibia's ǁKaras Region. He is the brother-in-law of Namibia's founding President Sam Nujoma.

== History ==
Mushimba, who was the brother of President Sam Nujoma's wife, Kovambo Nujoma, was involved in the liberation struggle beginning in the early 1960s. As the national organiser for SWAPO inside the country, he was arrested and tortured several times by the apartheid authorities in the mid-1970s. In 1975 he was arrested in connection with the assassination of Ndonga Chief Filemon Elifas, the Chief Minister of the tribal Ovambo executive. Mushimba was sentenced to death but released on appeal in 1977 after it was found that the defense had leaked documents to the prosecution in his original trial. After his release he left for exile, where he acted as a 'fixer' for SWAPO, particularly concerning money matters. During the 1980s he was Deputy Treasurer on the SWAPO Politburo. His political track record and the fact that he was Nujoma's brother-in-law did not prevent him being detained by SWAPO in the late 1980s.

With independence, Mushimba played a dominant role in a number of business initiatives ranging from fishing through banking to construction. Several made newspaper headlines in the 1990s. He was chairman of Stocks and Stocks Namibia when the company built the Windhoek Country Club and Resort. The hotel's construction fell so far behind schedule that its launch event, the Miss Universe pageant of 1995, had to be held with the complex only part-completed. By the end of the decade, the government owned the hotel after Stocks and Stocks failed to pay its debts. Stocks and Stocks also won contracts worth over N$300 million to build government office buildings in the 1990s. The government granted Mushimba's mining company, PE Minerals, the mineral rights for the Rosh Pinah zinc mine in 1995. Following three years of uncertainty over the future of the mine, PE Minerals signed a partnership deal with the mine owners, Iscor, at the end of 1998. Another company that Mushimba heads, Namibian Harvest Investments, bought the majority share in the struggling City Savings and Investment Bank in 2001.

Mushimba was reported to be acting as the representative of international diamond trader Maurice Tempelsman, who in 2002 offered the government an interest free loan in return for keeping De Beers' exclusive marketing contract for NamDeb's diamonds. He has also emerged as a key player in Epia Investments, the empowerment company formed by Ohlthaver and List, the owners of Namibia Breweries. Mushimba has played a key role in several of Namibia's largest black empowerment deals.

Mushimba died on 31 August 2014 in a Cape Town hospital where he had been hospitalised for three weeks previous. According to his daughter Ujama, Mushimba was admitted for a back surgery, but suffered complications after the operation. He was 67 years old (just 3 months short of his 68th birthday).
