= Uukwangali =

Kingdom of the Kavango people

Uukwangali (also Ukwangali, Kwangali, and Kwangari) is a traditional kingdom of the Kavango people in northern Namibia. Its capital is Nkurenkuru, its current Hompa (king) is Eugene Siwombe Kudumo. The Uukwangali speak ruKwangali.

== List of rulers ==
- Queen Mate I (c. 1750)
- Queen Nankali (c. 1775)
- Queen Simbara (1785–1800)
- Queen Mate II (1800–1818)
- King Siremo (1818–1822)
- King Mpepo (1822–1833)
- King Sikongo (1833–1870)
- King Mpasi (1870–1880)
- Queen Mpande (1880–1886)
- King Himarua (1886–1910)
- King Kandjimi Hawanga (1910–1924)
- King Mbuna (1924–1926)
- Queen Kanuni (1926–1941) (first reign)
- King Sivute (1941–1958)
- Queen Kanuni (1958–1971) (second reign)
- King Mbandu (1971–1977)
- King Daniel Sitendu or Mpasi (1977–2014)
- King Eugene Siwombe Kudumo (2015–present)
