= Merlin Diamond =

Namibian sprinter

Merlin Diamond (born 1991) is a Namibian sprinter. She won the 100 metres and 200 metres at the 2010 National Athletic Championships, Namibia.

She is one of the five Namibian athletes to win a bursary from Olympic Solidarity, the International Olympic Council's development fund.
