= Franja du Plessis =

Namibian singer

- Born: 2 January 1994 (age 32); Windhoek, Namibia
- Genres: Pop
- Instrument: Voice
- Years active: 2016–present
- Labels: Juanita Records

Franja du Plessis (born 2 January 1994) is a Namibian singer-songwriter, who sings in Afrikaans. She appeared in the 2013 film As jy sing as Marna. Her debut album, My verhaal ("My Story"), went platinum in 2016. She is the daughter of singer Juanita du Plessis and the sister of singer Ruan Josh.

== Education ==
She graduated from Hoërskool Die Wilgers in Pretoria.
