= College of the Arts, Windhoek =

Art school in Windhoek, Namibia

College of the Arts
- Motto in English: Lifelong learning through the arts
- Type: Arts college
- Established: 1971
- Rector: Angelika Schroeder
- Academic staff: 39 full-time 75 part-time (2011)
- Location: Windhoek, Khomas Region, Namibia; 22.569°S 17.083°E

The College of the Arts (COTA) is an institution of arts education in Windhoek, the capital of Namibia. In 2011, it employed 39 lecturers full-time and 75 on a part-time basis. The institution had 450 students studying towards a diploma, a further 650 enrolled in fee-financed courses, and 4,800 students participated in community-based programs organised by the college.

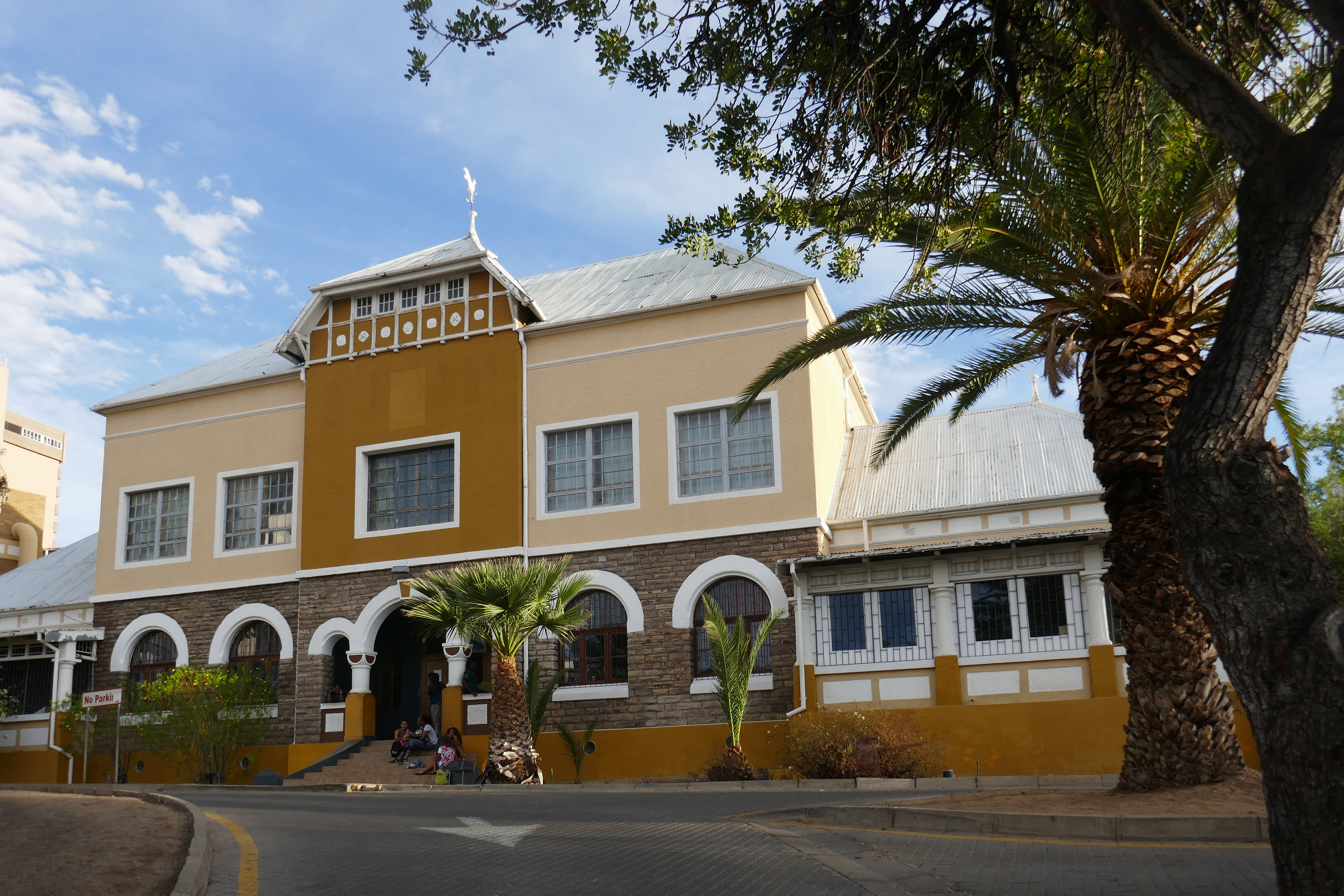
College of the Arts main campus

COTA was established by people of German heritage in 1971 as a Whites-only state conservatory of music. In the mid-80s, drama and visual arts were added to the Conservatory's programs, and in 1990 it was renamed College for the Arts.

The seven full-time degree programs currently offered are African Performing Arts, Visual Arts and Fashion Design, Television Production, Radio Production, New Media Design, and Music and Sound Production. Tertiary programs are offered as three-year courses of studies. COTA's leitmotiv is "Lifelong learning through the arts".
