= Breastfeeding and HIV =

Breastfeeding by HIV-infected mothers is the practice of breastfeeding of HIV-infected mothers and include those who may want to or are currently breastfeeding. HIV can be transmitted to the infant through breastfeeding. The risk of transmission varies and depends on the viral load in the mother's milk. An infant can be infected with HIV throughout the duration of the pregnancy or during childbirth (intrapartum).

== Background ==
Breastfeeding with HIV guidelines established by the WHO suggest that HIV-infected mothers (particularly those in resource-poor countries) practice exclusive breastfeeding only, rather than mixed breastfeeding practices that involve other dietary supplements or fluids. Many studies have revealed the high benefit of exclusive breastfeeding to both mother and child, documenting that exclusive breastfeeding for a period of 6 months significantly reduces transmission, provides the infant with a greater chance of survival in the first year of life, and helps the mother to recover from the negative health effects of birth much more quickly.

Despite these positive indicators, other studies have determined that bottle-fed babies of HIV-infected mothers approximately has a 19 percent chance of becoming infected, in comparison to breastfed babies who had an approximate 49 percent chance of infection. Such a variance in findings makes it difficult to institute a proper set of guidelines for HIV-infected women in third-world or developing countries, where alternative forms of feeding are not always acceptable, feasible, affordable, sustainable, and safe (AFASS).

== PMTCT policy challenges ==
The practice of breastfeeding for HIV positive mothers is a highly contested and controversial global public health concern. Programs for prevention of mother to child transmission (PMTCT) and other international guidelines offer preventative interventions to address mother to child transmission(MTCT) of HIV in Third World countries. PMTCT programs provide HIV-positive women with recommendations and services including antiretroviral therapy (ART), modifications in infant feeding practices (i.e., exclusive breastfeeding or exclusive replacement feeding), and counseling.

Although prevention of mother to child transmission (PMTCT) programs have been implemented across different regions, their success in resource-constrained settings is still widely debated upon. In 2008, the majority of sub-Saharan Africa as a whole had an estimate of 430,000 HIV infections among children under the age of 15. HIV-positive women's lack of participation and adherence to PMTCT services and infant feeding guidelines has made the success of these policies difficult, despite the knowledge and technology that has been dedicated to them. Many women fear knowing their HIV status. Generally speaking, HIV-positive mothers lack support, especially from males, thus resulting in their stigmatization and exclusion by members of the community. It is because of this that most women end up losing contact with development programs, which end soon after the mother delivers. The discontinuation of these programs makes a knowledge and understanding of different feeding options difficult for these mothers, because these programs are not there to present them with the necessary information.

== Cross-cultural experiences ==
Access to available resources for the prevention of MTCT of HIV varies across different cultural regions. "MTCT of HIV has been virtually eliminated in well-resourced settings such as the United States and Europe". Available medical and therapeutic resources in developed countries can include drugs for HIV-positive mothers during pregnancy and labour, cesarean delivery to reduce the infant's exposure to infection; and modifications in infant feeding practices. In third world settings, medical resources and technology can be very hard to find and can serve as a financial burden to HIV-positive mothers. HIV-infected mothers refer to counselors for expert knowledge and recommendations on infant feeding and health. Treatment amenities in resource-constrained settings are also available to HIV-positive mothers in the form of antiretroviral therapy (ART) which is one resource that has contributed to the elimination of MTCT of HIV in first world countries. In order to have access to resources, HIV-positive mothers must be able maintain follow up appointments regularly, however, this is problematic in resource-limited settings due to weak infrastructure in health care systems in countries such as India, Tanzania and Nigeria. This can also serve as a dilemma for HIV-positive mothers because although limited resources are available to them, financial constraint can prevent women from accessing available treatments. This can influence HIV-positive mother's decision to rely solely on breastfeeding as a primary feeding option due to financial instability.

Anthropological research demonstrates that in contexts where breastfeeding is essential to infant survival, such as in resource poor settings, PMTCT infant feeding guidelines challenge notions of motherhood and women's decision-making power over infant care, and colour HIV positive mothers' infant feeding experiences. In eastern Africa, infant mortality is high and breastfeeding is vital for infant survival. Here, motherhood is defined as the responsibility for ensuring the child's proper growth and health. Breastfeeding is also seen as a cultural practice that helps create a social bond between mother and child. However, there is a disjuncture between PMTCT policy's infant feeding guideline and what is considered to be good mothering behaviour. The PMTCT policy promotes replacement feeding because it is believed to prevent the risk of transmission of HIV. However, adhering to such guidelines are difficult for mothers in resource-limited settings who believe that not breastfeeding one's child would be harmful to their health and survival, as well as threaten the "development of close bodily and emotional bonds between mother and child". As such, not breastfeeding, for HIV-positive women, is perceived as failing to be a good mother.

== World Health Organization guideline ==
In an effort to further refine the United Nations guideline for optimal infant feeding options for HIV-infected mothers, the World Health Organization (WHO) held a three-day convention in Geneva in 2006 to review new evidence that had been established since they last established a guideline in 2000. Participants included UN agencies, representative from nongovernmental organizations, researchers, infant feeding experts, and WHO headquarters departments. The convention concluded with the following recommendations: If replacement feeding is acceptable, feasible, affordable and safe, HIV-infected mothers are recommended to use replacement feeding. Otherwise, exclusive breastfeeding is recommended. At six months, if replacement feeding is still not available, HIV-infected mothers are encouraged to slowly introduce food while continuing breastfeeding. Those with HIV-infected infants are recommended to continue breastfeeding even after 6 months.

== See also ==
- Breastfeeding and HIV transmission avoidance to prevent malnutrition in South Africa
- Breastfeeding difficulties
- Breastfeeding promotion controversies: Breastfeeding and HIV
- HIV/AIDS: Mother-to-child
- Management of HIV/AIDS: Pregnant women
- Marian Tompson, leader of AnotherLook at Breastfeeding and HIV/AIDS
