= List of multilingual bands and artists =

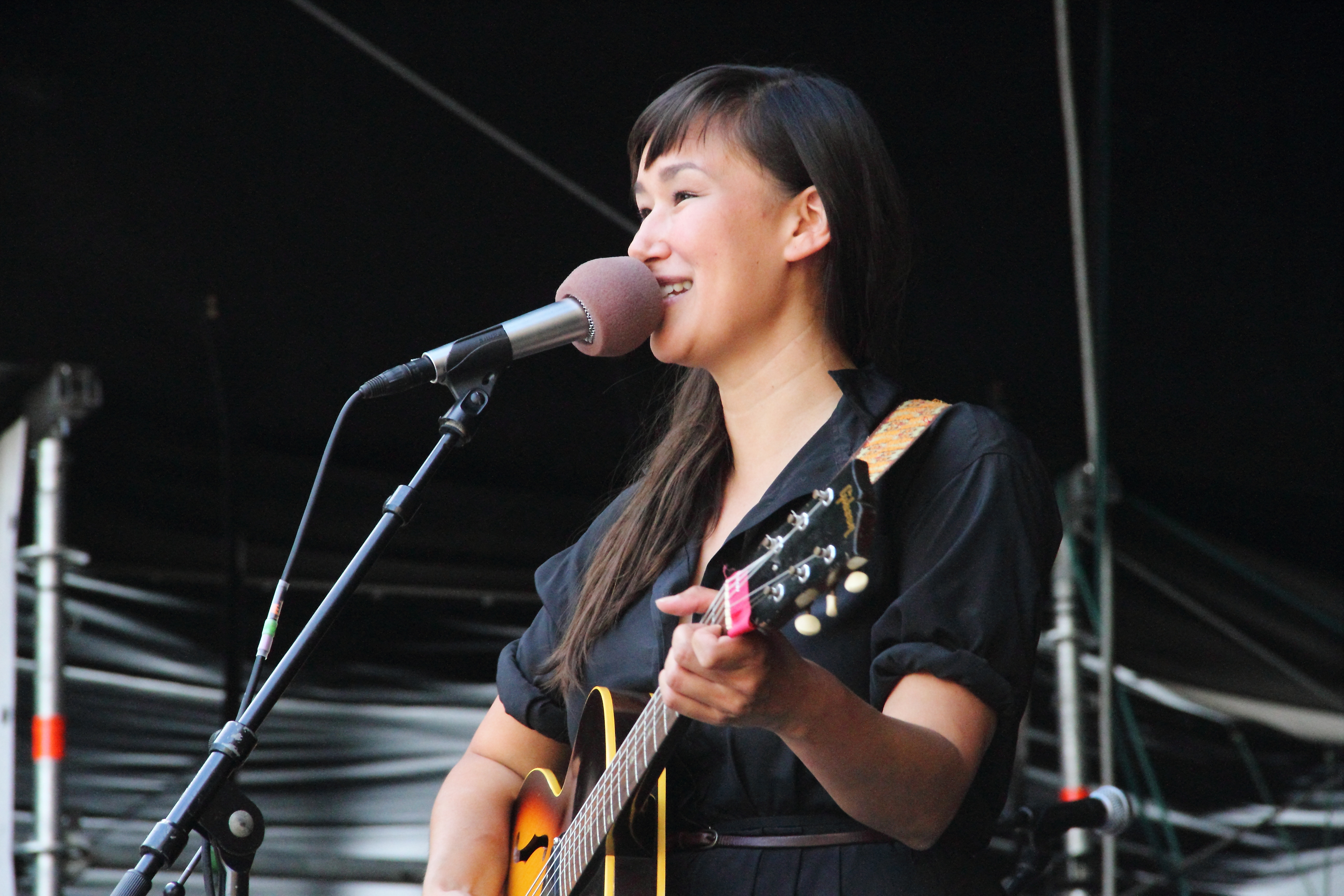
Nive Nielsen, Greenlandic singer and songwriter

This is a list of multilingual bands and artists. The band's or artist's native language is listed first. The list itself may also contain some singers from all over the world whose first language is English and who have the ability to sing in different languages.

== Individual artists ==
=== 0–9 ===
[top]

=== A ===
- Saara Aalto (Finnish, English, French, Swedish, Japanese, Chinese)
- Salvatore Adamo (Italian, French, Spanish, English, Japanese, German, Portuguese, Dutch, and Turkish)
- Chloë Agnew (English, Irish Gaelic, Latin, Italian and German)
- Christina Aguilera (English, Spanish)
- Ai (Japanese, English)
- Aimer (Japanese, English)
- Atif Aslam (Urdu, Punjabi, English)
- Stellvester Ajero (Filipino, English, Korean)
- Nancy Ajram (Arabic, French, Armenian)
- Chava Alberstein (Hebrew, Yiddish, English)
- Eden Alene (English, Amharic, Hebrew, Arabic)
- Azam Ali (Persian, Hindi, Turkish, Arabic, Latin, French, English)
- Alizée (French, English)
- Alvan (Breton, English)
- Thomas Anders (German, English, Spanish)
- Mayra Andrade (Cape Verdean Creole, Portuguese, French, English)
- Anggun (Indonesian, French, English, Russian)
- Anitta (singer) (Portuguese, Spanish, English, Italian, French)
- Marc Anthony (Spanish, English)
- Anza (Japanese, English)
- Zohar Argov (Hebrew, Arabic)
- Louis Armstrong (English, French)
- Arno (French, Dutch, English)
- Ásgeir (Icelandic, English)
- Lys Assia (German, French, Italian)
- Natacha Atlas (Arabic, English, French)
- Albert Au (Cantonese, English)
- Brian Auger (English, Italian)
- Aya (Japanese, English)
- Charles Aznavour (French, English, Spanish, German, Italian, Armenian)
[top]

=== B ===
- Joan Baez (English, Spanish, Portuguese)
- Adrienne Bailon (Spanish, English)
- Baekhyun (Korean, English, Japanese)
- Antonio Banderas (Spanish, English)
- Azealia Banks (English, Spanish, Portuguese)
- Max Barskih (Ukrainian, Russian, English)
- Basshunter (Swedish, English)
- Christian Bautista (Filipino, English)
- Zazie Beetz (English, German)
- Rashid Behbudov (Azerbaijani, Russian, Persian, Turkish, Armenian, Hindi, Urdu and Bengali)
- Alec Benjamin (English, Mandarin)
- Dudley Benson (English, Māori)
- Beverly (Tagalog, English, Japanese)
- Beyoncé (English, Spanish)
- Asha Bhosle (Hindi, Urdu, Telugu, Marathi, Bengali, Gujarati, Punjabi, Tamil, Malayalam, English)
- Big Time Rush (English, Spanish)
- Dima Bilan (Russian, English)
- David Bisbal (Spanish, English)
- Björk (Icelandic, English)
- Rubén Blades (Spanish, English)
- Elvis Blue (Afrikaans, English)
- BoA (Korean, Japanese, English, Mandarin Chinese)
- Bonnie Pink (Japanese, English)
- Frida Boccara (French, Spanish, German, English, Italian)
- Andrea Bocelli (Italian, Spanish, English, French)
- Jacqueline Boyer (French, German, English)
- Los Lonely Boys (Spanish, English)
- Mike Brant (French, German, Hebrew, Spanish)
- Sarah Brightman (English, Spanish, French, Latin, Italian, Japanese)
- Corry Brokken (Dutch, French)
- Carla Bruni (French, English)
[top]

=== C ===
- Montserrat Caballé (Catalan, Spanish, German, Italian, French, English)
- Camila Cabello (Spanish, English, French)
- Cardi B (Spanish, English)
- Mariah Carey (English, Spanish)
- Roberto Carlos (Portuguese, Spanish, English and Italian)
- Arno Carstens (Afrikaans, English)
- Cameron Cartio (Persian, Spanish, English)
- Enrico Caruso (Italian, French, English)
- Tommy Cash (Estonian, Russian, English)
- Sarah Chalke (English, German, French)
- Jackie Chan (Cantonese, Mandarin Chinese, Japanese, English)
- Priscilla Chan (Cantonese, Mandarin Chinese, Japanese, English)
- Manu Chao (Spanish, French, English, Catalan, Portuguese)
- Grégory Charles (French, English, Spanish)
- Cheloo (Romanian, English)
- Edison Chen (Cantonese, Mandarin Chinese, English)
- Kelly Chen (Cantonese, Japanese, Mandarin, English)
- Sammi Cheng (Cantonese, Mandarin Chinese, Japanese, English)
- Cecilia Cheung (Cantonese, Mandarin)
- Jacky Cheung (Cantonese, Mandarin Chinese, English)
- Maurice Chevalier (English, French)
- Charlene Choi (Cantonese, Mandarin)
- Christine and the Queens (French, English)
- Jon Christos (English, Greek, Latin, Spanish, German, Russian)
- Gillian Chung (Cantonese, Mandarin)
- Charlotte Church (English, Welsh, French, Italian, Latin, German)
- Gigliola Cinquetti (Italian, Spanish, French, German, English, Japanese)
- Petula Clark (English, French, Italian)
- Jemaine Clement (English, Māori)
- Tránsito Cocomarola (Spanish, Guarani)
- Cœur de pirate (French, English)
- Phil Collins (English, Spanish, French, German, Italian)
- Bradley Cooper (English, French)
- Cécile Corbel (French, Italian, Breton, English, German, Irish, Turkish, Cantonese, Japanese)
- Pilita Corrales (Filipino, English, Cebuano, Spanish)
- Annie Crummer (English, Māori, Cook Islands Māori)
- Cuco (English, Spanish)
- Josh Cullen Santos (Filipino, English)
[top]

=== D ===
- Joe Dassin (English, French, German, Spanish, Italian, Russian and Greek)
- Dalida (French, Italian, Spanish, German, Arabic, Japanese, Dutch, Flemish, Hebrew, Turkish, Greek and English)
- Mônica da Silva (English, Portuguese, Spanish, Italian, and French)
- Justin de Dios (Filipino, English)
- Cristina D'Avena (Italian, French, Spanish)
- Anne-Marie David (French, English, Turkish)
- Demon Kakka (Japanese, English)
- Dead (Swedish, English)
- Fabrizio de André (Italian, Genoese, Sardinian, Neapolitan, Spanish)
- Sanne Denotté (Dutch, Flemish)
- Leonardo DiCaprio (English, German)
- Marina Diamandis (Welsh, English, Greek)
- Celine Dion (French, English, Spanish, Italian, Latin, Japanese, Mandarin, German)
- D.O. (Korean, Mandarin Chinese, English, Japanese, Spanish)
- Arielle Dombasle (French, Spanish)
- Dotter (Swedish, English)
- Lila Downs (Spanish, English, Mixtec, Zapotec, Mayan, Nahuatl, Purépecha)
- Juanita du Plessis (Afrikaans, English)
- Katerine Duska (English, Greek)
[top]

=== E ===
- Elisa (Japanese, English)
- Elissa (Arabic, French, English)
- Ensiferum (English, Finnish)
- Enya (Irish Gaelic, English, Welsh, Latin, Spanish, Japanese, Sindarin, Quenya, Loxian)
- Gloria Estefan (Spanish, English, Portuguese, French)
- Jackie Evancho (English, Italian, Latin, French)
[top]

=== F ===
- Lara Fabian (French, English, Spanish, Italian)
- Myriam Fares (Arabic, English, Kurdish, Berber)
- Brenda Fassie (Zulu, English)
- Faudel (Arabic, French)
- Faylan (Japanese, English)
- Sogdiana Fedorinskaya (Uzbek, Russian, Ukrainian, French, English, Chechen)
- José Feliciano (Spanish, English)
- M. S. Fernando (Sinhala, Tamil, English)
- Tiziano Ferro (Italian, Spanish, Portuguese, English)
- Blu Fiefer (Arabic, English]
- Colin Firth (English, Italian)
- Jodie Foster (English, French)
- Connie Francis (English, Italian, Spanish, Yiddish, Portuguese, French, Japanese, Hebrew, Irish, Greek)
- Daði Freyr (Icelandic, English, German)
- Marty Friedman (English, Japanese)
- Conny Froboess (English, Italian, German, Dutch)
- Annette Funicello (English, Italian)
- Nelly Furtado (English, Spanish, Portuguese)
[top]

=== G ===
- Karol G (Spanish, English)
- Lady Gaga (English, Italian, French)
- Polina Gagarina (Russian, Greek, English)
- Francesca Gagnon (French, English, Spanish, Italian)
- France Gall (French, Japanese, Italian, German)
- Elīna Garanča (Spanish, Italian, English, German, French)
- Melody Gardot (English, French)
- Garou (French, English)
- Anna German (Polish, Russian, German, Italian, Spanish, English, Latin, Mongolian)
- Sarah Geronimo (Filipino, English, Japanese)
- Enrique Gil (Filipino, English)
- Bebel Gilberto (Portuguese, English)
- David Gilmour (English, French)
- Gisela (Spanish, Catalan)
- Gjon's Tears (French, English, Albanian)
- Selena Gomez (English, Spanish)
- Lesley Gore (English, French, German, Italian)
- Martin Gore (English, German)
- Edyta Górniak (Polish, English)
- Yuko Goto (Japanese, English)
- Karel Gott (Czech, German, English)
- Ariana Grande (English, Spanish)
- Ilaria Graziano (Italian, English)
- Josh Groban (English, Spanish, Italian)
- Gwenno (English, Welsh, Cornish)
[top]

=== H ===
- Sarit Hadad (Hebrew, Arabic)
- Carola Häggkvist (Swedish, English)
- Ria Hall (English, Māori)
- Johnny Hallyday (French, English)
- Ayumi Hamasaki (Japanese, English, Mandarin Chinese)
- Luca Hänni (German, English)
- Morten Harket (Norwegian, English)
- David Hasselhoff (English, German)
- Masato Hayakawa (English, Japanese)
- Ofra Haza (Hebrew, Arabic, English, French, German)
- Jerry Heil (Ukrainian, English)
- Sonja Herholdt (Afrikaans, English)
- hide (Japanese, English)
- Steve Hofmeyr (Afrikaans, English)
- Ryō Horikawa (Japanese, English)
- Hozier (English, Irish)
- Hyde (Japanese, English)
[top]

=== I ===
- Ibeyi (English, French, Spanish, Yoruba)
- Enrique Iglesias (Spanish, English, Italian)
- Julio Iglesias (Spanish, French, English, Italian, Filipino)
- Inna (Romanian, English, Spanish, Arabic, French, Catalan)
- Joe Inoue (Japanese, English)
- Jason Isaacs (English, Spanish)
- Lidia Isac (Russian, Romanian, English, French, Italian)
- Yoko Ishida (Japanese, English)
- Yasushi Ishii (Japanese, English)
- Ishtar (Arabic, Hebrew, French, Spanish, Bulgarian, Russian, English)
- Kanako Itou (Japanese, English, French)
- Bera Ivanishvili (Georgian, English, Russian, French)
[top]

=== J ===
- Bobby van Jaarsveld (Afrikaans, English)
- Hugh Jackman (English, French)
- Jamala (Ukrainian, Crimean Tatar, Russian, English)
- Stella Jang (Korean, English, French)
- Wyclef Jean (Creole, English)
- Katherine Jenkins (Welsh, English, Italian, Latin, French)
- Felip Jhon Suson (Filipino, Cebuano, English)
- Joji (Japanese, English)
- Seu Jorge (Portuguese, English)
- Joselito (Spanish, Italian)
- Milla Jovovich (Ukrainian, English)
[top]

=== K ===
- Hironobu Kageyama (Japanese, English)
- Bente Kahan (Yiddish, Ladino, Hebrew, Polish, Russian, Norwegian, Hungarian, German, English)
- Kajto (Esperanto, English, Dutch and Frisian)
- Sofia Källgren (Swedish, English, Mandarin Chinese)
- Takeshi Kaneshiro (Mandarin, Cantonese, Japanese, English)
- Yoko Kanno (Japanese, French)
- Kahimi Karie (Japanese, French, English, Italian, Spanish)
- Khaled (Arabic, French)
- Khruangbin (Band) (English, Spanish, French)
- Hadiqa Kiani (Urdu, Hindi, Punjabi, Siraiki, Sindhi, Pashto, Balochi, Kashmiri, Persian, French, English, Mandarin Chinese, Malay, Turkish and Arabic)
- Troy Kingi (English, Māori)
- Laila Kinnunen (Finnish, Swedish, English, Russian, German, French, Italian, Spanish, Hungarian, Afrikaans)
- Karlie Kloss (English, French)
- K'Maro (Arabic, French, English)
- Kokia (Japanese, English, Irish, Latin)
- Psoy Korolenko (Russian, Yiddish, French, English)
- Korpiklaani (English, Finnish)
- Kraftwerk (German, English)
- Isa Kremer (Yiddish, Russian, French, Italian, English)
- Diane Kruger (German, English, French)
- Dimash Kudaibergen (Kazakh, Russian, English, Mandarin, Italian, French, Spanish, German, Serbian, Turkish, Ukrainian, Kyrgyz)
- Mila Kunis (Russian, English)
- Maon Kurosaki (Japanese, English)
- Hoko Kuwashima (Japanese, English)
- Kylee (English, Japanese)
- Sissel Kyrkjebø (English, Norwegian, Swedish, Danish, Irish, Italian, French, Russian, Icelandic, Faroese, German, Neapolitan, Māori, Japanese, and Latin)
[top]

=== L ===
- Sandy Lam (Cantonese, English, Mandarin Chinese, Japanese)
- Henry Lau (English, Korean, Mandarin Chinese, Cantonese)
- Sandra Lauer (German, English)
- Daliah Lavi (Hebrew, German, Swedish, Italian, French, Spanish, English)
- Lisa LeBlanc (French, English)
- Coco Lee (Cantonese, Mandarin Chinese, English)
- Lee Soo Young (Korean, Japanese)
- Ute Lemper (German, French, English)
- Patricia Lewis (Afrikaans, English)
- Dua Lipa (English, Albanian)
- Anita Lipnicka (Polish, English)
- Lira (Xhosa, Zulu, Sesotho, English, Afrikaans)
- Till Lindemann (English, German, Russian)
- LiSA (Japanese, English)
- Jennifer Lopez (Spanish, English)
- Ani Lorak (Ukrainian, Russian, English)
- Lorde (English, Māori)
- Loreen (Swedish, English)
- Sophia Loren (Italian, English)
- Helmut Lotti (Belgian Dutch, Afrikaans, English, German, Latin, Xhosa, Zulu, Swahili, Ndebele)
- Loud (Quebec French, English)
- Olivia Lufkin (Japanese, English)
[top]

=== M ===
- Enrico Macias (French, Hebrew, Arabic, Spanish, Italian)
- Mallu Magalhães (Portuguese, English)
- Miriam Makeba "Mama Afrika" (Xhosa, Zulu, English)
- Siw Malmkvist (Swedish, German, Spanish)
- Cheb Mami (Arabic, French)
- Manizha (Russian, English)
- Ceylon Manohar (Tamil, Sinhala, English)
- Margaret (Polish, English)
- Bob Marley (Jamaican, English)
- Maro (Portuguese, English)
- Teejay Marquez (Filipino, English, Indonesian)
- Bruno Mars (English, Spanish)
- Ricky Martin (Spanish, English)
- Virginia Martínez (Spanish, Catalan)
- Mia Martini (Italian, French, Spanish)
- Massari (Arabic, English)
- Souad Massi (Algerian, Arabic, French)
- Mireille Mathieu (French, English, German, Spanish, Russian)
- Seiko Matsuda (Japanese, English)
- Takahiro Matsumoto (Japanese, English)
- Méav Ní Mhaolchatha (English, Gaelic, French, Latin, Italian, German)
- Mell (Japanese, English)
- Reinhard Mey (German, French, Dutch, English)
- Mika (French, English, Italian, Spanish)
- Christina Milian (English, Spanish)
- Milva (Italian, German, French, Spanish, Japanese, Korean, English, Greek)
- Mina (Italian, English, Spanish, Portuguese, German)
- Minnie (Thai, English, Korean, Japanese, Mandarin Chinese)
- Miyavi (Japanese, English)
- MØ (Danish, English)
- Anika Moa (English, Māori)
- Hinewehi Mohi (English, Māori)
- Anna Moffo (English, Italian)
- French Montana (Arabic, English)
- Marisa Monte (Portuguese, English)
- Alexa Weber Morales (French, English, Spanish, Portuguese)
- Morissette (Cebuano, English, Filipino)
- Takahiro Moriuchi (Japanese, English)
- Howard Morrison (English, Māori)
- Nana Mouskouri (Greek, French, English, German, Dutch, Italian, Portuguese, Spanish, Hebrew, Welsh, Mandarin Chinese, Corsican)
- Anita Mui (Cantonese, Japanese, Mandarin Chinese, English)
- Marie Myriam (French, English, Spanish, Portuguese, German)
[top]

=== N ===
- Murat Nasyrov (Russian, Uyghur)
- Zuzana Navarová (Czech, Slovak, Spanish, Romani, Yiddish, Russian, Quechua)
- Youssou N'Dour (Wolof, French, English)
- Nena (German, English)
- Anna Netrebko (Russian, Italian, French, German, English, Czech)
- Nianell (Afrikaans, English)
- Minoru Niihara (Japanese, English)
- Achinoam Nini, a.k.a. Noa (Hebrew, English, Spanish)
- Siti Nurhaliza (Malay, English, Mandarin Chinese, Japanese)
- Namewee (Chinese, Hokkien, Cantonese, Hainanese, Malay, English, Indian, Thai, Vietnamese, Arabic, Bengali, Burmese )
[top]

=== O ===
- Esther Ofarim (Hebrew, English, French, German, Spanish, Italian, Ladino, Neopolitan, and occasionally Portuguese, Russian, Romanian and others
- Masatoshi Ono (Japanese, English)
- Yoko Ono (Japanese, English)
- Rita Ora (English, Albanian)
- Páll Óskar Hjálmtýsson (Icelandic, English, Esperanto)
- Origa (Russian, Latin, English)
- Moishe Oysher (Yiddish, Hebrew, English)
[top]

=== P ===
- Emanuela Pacotto (Italian, Japanese)
- Daniel Padilla (Filipino, English)
- Gwyneth Paltrow (English, Spanish, French, Italian)
- Helena Paparizou (Greek, English, Swedish)
- Vanessa Paradis (French, English)
- Jay Park (English, Korean)
- Sandara Park (Korean, English, Filipino, Chinese, Japanese)
- Jack Parow (Afrikaans, English)
- John Paulo Bagnas Nase (Filipino, English, Spanish)
- Alina Pash (Ukrainian, English)
- Laura Pausini (Italian, English, Spanish, French, Portuguese, German, Latin, Chinese, Sicilian, Neapolitan, Romagnol, Catalan)
- Luciano Pavarotti (Italian, English, Spanish, French)
- Jan Peerce (English, Italian, Yiddish, Hebrew)
- Ajda Pekkan (Turkish, English, French, Italian, Arabic and Japanese)
- Carlos PenaVega (English, Spanish)
- Indrani Perera (Sinhala, Tamil)
- Anke Pietrangeli (Afrikaans, English)
- Pitbull (Spanish, English)
- Dawid Podsiadło (Polish, English)
- M. Pokora (French, English)
- Oleksandr Ponomaryov (Ukrainian, English)
- Joël Prévost (French, English)
- Dalvanius Prime (English, Māori)
- Toše Proeski (Macedonian, Serbian, English, Italian)
- Sława Przybylska (Polish, Yiddish)
- Psy (Korean, English)
- Alla Pugacheva (Russian, English, German)
[top]

=== Q ===
[top]

=== R ===
- Eros Ramazzotti (Italian, Spanish, English)
- Laurika Rauch (Afrikaans, English, Dutch)
- Lauris Reiniks (Latvian, Lithuanian, Estonian, Russian, English, French, Italian, Spanish, German, Dutch, Turkish)
- ReoNa (Japanese, English)
- Cliff Richard (English, German, Italian, Spanish)
- Maisey Rika (English, Māori)
- Rita (Hebrew, English, Persian)
- RM (Korean, English)
- Robyn (English, Swedish)
- Linda Ronstadt (English, Spanish, Italian)
- Sofia Rotaru (Ukrainian, Russian, Italian, English, Polish, Bulgarian, Romanian)
- Demis Roussos (English, French, Greek, Italian, Spanish, German)
- Prince Royce (Spanish, English)
- Paulina Rubio (Spanish, English)
- Omar Rudberg (Spanish, English, Swedish)
- Rob Ruha (English, Māori)
- Bic Runga (English, French, Māori)
- Ruslana (Ukrainian, English)
- Alexander Rybak (Norwegian, Russian, English, Belarusian, Swedish)
[top]

=== S ===
- Eric Saade (Swedish, English)
- Samira Said (Arabic, French)
- Eizo Sakamoto (Japanese, English)
- Maaya Sakamoto (Japanese, English)
- Carole Samaha (Arabic, French, English, Spanish)
- Aris San (Greek, Hebrew, Spanish)
- Mustafa Sandal (Turkish, English)
- Carlos Santana (Spanish, English)
- Sarbel (Greek, English, Arabic)
- Jacopo Sarno (Italian, English)
- Nozomu Sasaki (Japanese, English)
- Hiroyuki Sawano (Japanese, English)
- Joseph Schmidt (German, Italian, English, French, Spanish, Dutch, Hebrew, Aramaic)
- Leon Schuster (Afrikaans, English)
- Bobbejaan Schoepen (Dutch, German, English, French)
- Jon Secada (Spanish, English)
- Neil Sedaka (English, Italian, Yiddish, Spanish, German, Hebrew, Japanese, French)
- Lhasa de Sela (English, Spanish)
- Selena (Spanish, English)
- Marija Šerifović (Serbian, Russian, English)
- Joan Manuel Serrat (Spanish, Catalan)
- Shakira (Spanish, English, Portuguese, Arabic, French, German)
- Sandie Shaw (English, Spanish, German, French, Italian)
- Ringo Sheena (Japanese, English, French, German, Portuguese)
- Kultur Shock (English, Spanish, Serbian and many others)
- Heintje Simons (Dutch, German, English)
- Hollie Smith (English, Māori)
- Soap&Skin (German, French, English)
- Luísa Sonza (Portuguese, Spanish, English)
- Soraya (Spanish, English)
- Sowelu (Japanese, English)
- Bojana Stamenov (Serbian, English, French, Spanish, German)
- Alexandra Stan (Romanian, English)
- Stephanie (Japanese, English)
- Cat Stevens / Yusuf Islam (English, Greek, Arabic)
- Martina Stoessel (Spanish, English)
- Natasha St-Pier (French, English, Cantonese)
- Rita Streich (German, Russian, French, Italian, Czech)
- Barbra Streisand (English, French)
- Stromae (French, English, Flemish)
- Linda de Suza (Portuguese, French)
- SZA (English, Spanish)
[top]

=== T ===
- Taeyeon (Korean, English, Japanese)
- Rachid Taha (Arabic, French)
- Tomoko Tane (Japanese, English)
- Kisho Taniyama (Japanese, English)
- Serj Tankian (English, Armenian)
- Tarkan (Turkish, English)
- Hiba Tawaji (Arabic, French, English, German)
- Corey Taylor (English, Italian)
- Michel Teló (Portuguese, English)
- Prince Tui Teka (English, Māori)
- Kiri Te Kanawa (English, Māori, Latin, Italian, French, German)
- Teresa Teng (Mandarin, Hokkien, Cantonese, Japanese, Indonesian, English, French)
- Thalía (Spanish, English, Filipino, French, Portuguese)
- Charlize Theron (English, Afrikaans)
- Avi Toledano (Hebrew, French)
- Jelena Tomašević (Serbian, Spanish)
- Michie Tomizawa (Japanese, English)
- Dayanara Torres (Spanish, English)
- Umberto Tozzi (Italian, English, French, Spanish)
- Karsten Troyke (Yiddish, German, English)
- Basia Trzetrzelewska (Polish, English)
- Jolin Tsai (Mandarin, Hokkien, Cantonese, English)
- Anna Tsuchiya (Japanese, English)
- Luca Turilli (Italian, English)
[top]

=== U ===
- Kali Uchis (English, Spanish)
- Ricky Ullman (Hebrew, English)
- Hikaru Utada (Japanese, English)
[top]

=== V ===
- Ritchie Valens (Spanish, English)
- Caterina Valente (French, Italian, German, English, Spanish, Swedish, Dutch, Portuguese, Hebrew, Greek, Japanese)
- Giorgio Vanni (Italian, English)
- Nia Vardalos (English, Greek)
- Sylvie Vartan (French, English, Italian, Bulgarian)
- Alexander Veljanov (English, German, Macedonian, French)
- Caetano Veloso (Portuguese, English, Spanish)
- Mike Vescera (English, Japanese)
- Willemijn Verkaik (Dutch, German, English)
- Varg Vikernes (Norwegian, English)
- Victoria (Bulgarian, English)
- Violetta Villas (English, French, German, Italian, Latin, Neapolitan, Polish, Spanish, Russian)
- Pabllo Vittar (Portuguese, English, Spanish)
- Roch Voisine (French, English)
- Vice Vukov (Croatian, Italian)
[top]

=== W ===
- Stan Walker (English, Māori)
- Jackson Wang (English, Cantonese, Korean, Mandarin Chinese)
- Roksana Węgiel (Polish, English)
- Hayley Westenra (English, Māori, Italian, Irish Gaelic, German, Japanese and Latin)
- Roger Whittaker (English, German)
- Robbie Williams (English, Spanish, French)
- Heinz Winckler (Afrikaans, English)
- Karl Wolf (Arabic, English)
- Faye Wong (Cantonese, Mandarin Chinese, Japanese, English)
- Kris Wu (Mandarin Chinese, English, Korean)
[top]

=== X ===
- Xuxa (Portuguese, Spanish, English)
[top]

=== Y ===
- Mai Yamane (Japanese, English)
- Nagi Yanagi (Japanese, English)
- Savina Yannatou (Greek, Ladino)
- Yohio (English, Japanese, Swedish)
- Yoshiki (musician) (English, Japanese)
- Tata Young (Thai, English)
[top]

=== Z ===
- Batir Zakirov (Uzbek, Russian, Arabic, Hindi)
- Rika Zaraï (Hebrew, English, French, Italian, Spanish and German)
- Cristina Zavalloni (Italian, English, Spanish, Russian)
- Željko Joksimović (Serbian, English, Russian, Spanish)
- Jane Zhang (Mandarin, Cantonese, English, Spanish)
- Zivert (Russian, English)
- Karen Zoid (Afrikaans, English)
- Lolo Zouaï (English, French)
- Zucchero (Italian, English)
[top]

== Bands ==
=== 0–9 ===
- 2NE1 (South Korean band) (Korean, English, Japanese)
[top]

=== A ===
- ABBA (Swedish, English, German, Italian, Spanish, French)
- After School (Korean, Chinese Mandarin, English, Japanese)
- Aion (Japanese, English)
- Alabina (Arabic, Hebrew, Spanish, French)
- Alexandros (Japanese, English)
- Alien Weaponry (English, Māori)
- Animetal (Japanese, English)
- Animetal USA (English, Japanese)
- Anthem (Japanese, English)
- Antique (Greek, English, Swedish)
- Apulanta (Finnish, English)
- Arcade Fire (Mostly English, French)
- Arka'n (Ewe, English, French)
- Asian Kung-Fu Generation (Japanese, English)
- Astro (Korean, English, Japanese)
- Ateez (Korean, English, Japanese)
[top]

=== B ===
- B.A.P (Korean, Japanese)
- Babymetal (Japanese, English)
- The Backstreet Boys (English, Spanish)
- The Bala Brothers (Zulu, English, Afrikaans)
- Band-Maid (Japanese, English)
- Banghra (Spanish, English)
- The Barry Sisters (Yiddish, English, Hebrew, Spanish)
- Beat Crusaders (Japanese, English)
- The Beatles (English, French, German)
- Big Bang (Korean, Japanese, English)
- Blackpink (Korean, English, Thai, Japanese)
- Blonde Redhead (English, French, Italian)
- Blood Stain Child (Japanese, English)
- Bobbysocks! (Norwegian, English)
- Brainstorm (Latvian, English, Russian)
- Breed 77 (English, Spanish)
- BTS (Korean, English, Japanese)
- Buraka Som Sistema (Portuguese, English, Angolan Creole)
- Buranovskiye Babushki (Russian, English)
- Burzum (Norwegian, English)
- B'z (Japanese, English)
- BZN (Dutch, German, English, French)
[top]

=== C ===
- Capsule (Japanese, English)
- Caravan Palace (French, English, Spanish)
- Celtic Woman (English, Irish Gaelic, Latin, Italian and German)
- China Dolls (Thai, Chinese)
- Citi Zēni (Latvian, English)
- Clouseau (Dutch, English)
- CNCO (Spanish, English)
- Coldrain (English, Japanese)
- Corrupted (Japanese, Spanish, English, German)
- Cripple Bastards (Italian, English)
- Cross Gene (English, Mandarin, Korean, Japanese)
- Culcha Candela (German, English, Spanish)
[top]

=== D ===
- Daniel Kahn & The Painted Bird (English, Yiddish)
- Darkthrone (Norwegian, English)
- Dead End (Japanese, English)
- Die Antwoord (Afrikaans, English)
- Die Heuwels Fantasties (Afrikaans, English)
- Dir En Grey (Japanese, English)
- Die Toten Hosen (German, English, Spanish)
- Dimmu Borgir (Norwegian, English)
- Drax Project (English, Māori)
- The Dreams (Faroese, Danish, English)
- Dschinghis Khan (German, English)
- Duran Duran (English, Spanish, French, Portuguese)
- DNCE (English, Japanese)
[top]

=== E ===
- Eden (Afrikaans, English)
- Envy (Japanese, English)
- Eiffel 65 (English, Italian)
- Einstürzende Neubauten (German, English)
- El Chombo (Spanish, English)
- Ellegarden (Japanese, English)
- Esprit D'Air (Japanese, English)
- Esther & Abi Ofarim (Hebrew, English, French, German, Spanish, Italian, Ladino, Neopolitan etc.)
- EXID (Korean, Mandarin Chinese, English, Japanese)
- Exo (Korean, Mandarin Chinese, English, Japanese)
[top]

=== F ===
- Fabrika (Russian, English, French, Italian, Kabardian)
- Fake? (Japanese, English)
- Faky (Japanese, English)
- .Feast (Indonesian, English)
- Fear, and Loathing in Las Vegas (English, Japanese)
- FEMM (Japanese, English)
- Foto na Dans & Flash Republic (colloquially known as "Dans Republic") (Afrikaans, English)
- Four Jacks and a Jill (Afrikaans, English)
- Freshlyground (Zulu, Sesotho, English, Swahili)
[top]

=== G ===
- Galneryus (Japanese, English)
- Gastunk (Japanese, English)
- The Gazette (Japanese, English)
- Girls' Generation (Korean, English, Japanese)
- Girugamesh (Japanese, English)
- Gjon's Tears (Albanian, English, French)
- Gogol Bordello (English, Russian, Romani)
- Goldfinger (English, German)
- Gorky's Zygotic Mynci (English, Welsh)
- Got7 (Korean, English, Japanese, Mandarin Chinese)
- Granrodeo (Japanese, English)
- Gregorian (English, German, French, Latin)
- Grimskunk (French, English)
[top]

=== H ===
- Haggard (German, Italian, Latin, English)
- Hanoi Rocks (Finnish, English)
- Hello Sleepwalkers (Japanese, English)
- Herbs (English, Māori)
- Herreys (Swedish, English)
- High and Mighty Color (Japanese, English)
- Hiperkarma (Hungarian, English)
- Hi-Standard (English, Japanese)
- Howard Morrison Quartet (English, Māori)
[top]

=== I ===
- IC3PEAK (Russian, English)
- Ich Troje (Polish, English, German, Russian)
- Icona Pop (Swedish, English)
- Il Divo (English, Italian, Spanish, French, Latin)
- Il Volo (Italian, English, Sicilian, Spanish)
- Illit (Korean, Japanese, English)
- Impaled Nazarene (English, Finnish)
- Irie Révoltés (German, French)
- Iz*One (Korean, Japanese, English)
[top]

=== J ===
- JAM Project (Japanese, English)
- JKT48 (Indonesian, English)
- JO1 (Japanese, Korean, English)
- Joker Out (Slovene, Serbian, English)
- Jump5 (English, Hawaiian)
- Junoon (Urdu, English)
[top]

=== K ===
- Ka Hao (English, Māori)
- Katchafire (English, Māori)
- Kero Kero Bonito (English, Japanese)
- KMFDM (English, German, Russian, Spanish, French, Italian)
- Kneecap (Irish, English)
- Koza Mostra (Greek, English)
- Kraftwerk (German, English, French, Spanish, Italian, Japanese, Russian)
[top]

=== L ===
- L'Arc~en~Ciel (Japanese, English)
- L'Impératrice (French, English)
- Ladaniva (French, Armenian)
- Little Big (Russian, English)
- Lovebites (Japanese, English)
- Loudness (Japanese, English)
- Lynch (Japanese, English)
[top]

=== M ===
- Maimoa (English, Māori)
- Måneskin (Italian, English)
- Man with a Mission (Japanese, English)
- Manu Chao (Spanish, French, Italian, English, Portuguese)
- The Mars Volta (English, Spanish)
- Massilia Sound System (French, Occitan)
- Maximum the Hormone (Japanese, English)
- Mecano (Spanish, French)
- Mediæval Bæbes (Modern English, Latin, Middle English, French, Italian, Russian, Swedish, Cadenet, Scottish English, German, Manx Gaelic, Spanish, Welsh, Bavarian, Provençal, Irish Gaelic, Cornish)
- Milk & Honey (Arabic, English, French)
- Minimum Serious (French, English)
- Moana and the Moahunters (English, Māori)
- Modern Māori Quartet (English, Māori)
- Monsta X (Korean, English, Japanese)
- Monsieur Periné (Spanish, French, English, Portuguese)
[top]

=== N ===
- Necrodeath (English, Italian)
- The New Christy Minstrels (English, German)
- New Kids on the Block (English, Spanish)
- Nightwish (Finnish, English)
- Nocturnal Bloodlust (Japanese, English)
- Nothing's Carved in Stone (Japanese, English)
- No Mercy (Spanish, English)
- NCT (Korean, English, Japanese, Mandarin Chinese, German)
[top]

=== O ===
- Oblivion Dust (Japanese, English)
- One Ok Rock (Japanese, English)
- Opeth (Swedish, English)
- Os Mutantes (Portuguese, English)
- Os Paralamas do Sucesso (Portuguese, Spanish)
- Outrage (Japanese, English)
- O-Zone (Romanian, English)
[top]

=== P ===
- Paraziții (Romanian, English)
- Phoenix Rising (Spanish, English)
- Pink Martini (English, Arabic, Chinese, Croatian, Persian, French, German, Hebrew, Italian, Japanese, Portuguese, Romanian, Spanish, Turkish, Ukrainian, Xhosa)
- Pixies (English, Spanish)
- Placebo (English, French)
- Pomplamoose (English, French)
- Powerwolf (German, English)
- Premiata Forneria Marconi (Italian, English)
- Pristin (Korean, Chinese Mandarin, English)
- Puffy AmiYumi (Japanese, English)
[top]

=== Q ===
- Quarashi (Icelandic, English)
[top]

=== R ===
- Rammstein (German, English, Spanish)
- Red Elvises (Russian, English)
- Rhapsody of Fire (Italian, English, French, German)
- Rize (Japanese, English)
- Roxette (Swedish, English, Spanish)
- Root (Czech, English)
- Radwimps (Japanese, English)
[top]
- Riverside (Polish)

=== S ===
- Sabaton (Swedish, English)
- Sabbat (Japanese, English, Swahili, French)
- Santana (Spanish, English)
- Sao Sao Sao (Thai, English, Japanese)
- SBB (Polish, English)
- Scandal (Japanese, English)
- Scorpions (German, English, Russian)
- Seeed (German, English)
- Seekers (English, Fijian)
- Sepultura (Portuguese, English)
- Seikima-II (Japanese, English)
- S.E.S (Korean, Japanese)
- Seventeen (Korean, Chinese Mandarin, Chinese Cantonese, English)
- Shonen Knife (Japanese, English)
- SiM (English, Japanese)
- Sigh (English, Japanese)
- Simple Plan (English, French)
- Six60 (English, Māori)
- Smokey Mountain (Tagalog, English, Japanese)
- Sodom (German, English)
- Sons of Zion (English, Māori)
- Springbok Nude Girls (Afrikaans, English)
- Stereolab (English, French)
- Stray Kids (Korean, English, Japanese)
- Street Academics (Malayalam, English, Tamil)
- Sublime (English, Spanish)
- Sudden Lights (Latvian, English)
- Sugar (Korean, Japanese)
- Super Junior (Korean, Chinese Mandarin, Japanese)
- Super Junior-M (Korean, Chinese Mandarin)
- System Of A Down (English, Armenian)
[top]

=== T ===
- t.A.T.u. (Russian, English)
- T-ara (Korean, Chinese Mandarin, Japanese)
- The Temptations (English, Tagalog)
- The Warning (English, Spanish, French)
- Tokio Hotel (German, English)
- Tomorrow X Together (Korean, English, Chinese Mandarin, Japanese)
- Tvorchi (Ukrainian, English)
- Twice (Korean, Japanese, Chinese Mandarin, Taiwanese, English)
- Týr (Faroese, English, Danish, Icelandic)
[top]

=== U ===
- U-KISS (English, Japanese, Spanish, Korean)
- Uniq (Korean, Chinese Mandarin, English, Japanese, Portuguese, Tagalog)
[top]

=== V ===
- Vader (Polish, English)
- Vamps (Japanese, English)
- Victon (Korean, English)
- Voyager (English, Russian, German, Latin)
[top]

=== W ===
- WayV (Chinese Mandarin, Chinese Cantonese, Thai, Korean, English, German, Japanese)
- Wonder Girls (Korean, English, Japanese)
[top]

=== X ===
- X Japan (Japanese, English)
[top]

=== Y ===
- Yellow Claw (English, Dutch)
[top]

=== Z ===
- Zeraphine (German, English)
[top]

== See also ==
- Multilingualism
