= The Voice South Africa season 1 =

The Voice South Africa
- Season 1
- Hosted by: Lungile Radu; Stacy Norman
- Coaches: Kahn Morbee; Lira; Bobby van Jaarsveld; Karen Zoid
- Winner: Richard Stirton
- Winning coach: Kahn Morbee
- Runner-up: Gavin Edwards

Release
- Original network: M-Net
- Original release: 31 January – 22 May 2016

The Voice South Africa is a South African television music competition to find new singing talent. The first season began airing on 31 January 2016 on M-Net. The season is hosted by Lungile Radu with Stacy Norman as the V-Reporter, and are joined by coaches Kahn Morbee, Lira, Bobby van Jaarsveld, and Karen Zoid.

Richard Stirton won the first season on 22 May 2016.

== Teams ==
Colour key:

- Winner
- Runner-up
- Second Runner-up
- Eliminated in the Live shows
- Artist was stolen by another coach at the Battles
- Eliminated in the Battles
- Artist withdrew from the competition

== Blind auditions ==
Each coach has the length of the artists' performance to decide if they wanted that artist on their team. Should two or more coaches want the same artist, then the artist will choose their coach.

Colour key

✔	Coach hit his/her "I WANT YOU" button
	Artist defaulted to this coach's team
	Artist elected to join this coach's team
	Artist eliminated with no coach pressing his or her "I WANT YOU" button

=== Blind audition 1 (31 January) ===
The series premiere was broadcast on 31 January 2016.

- Group performance: The Voice South Africa coaches – The Spirit of the Great Heart - Johnny Clegg"

Order	Artist	Age	Song	Coaches and artists choices			
Order	Artist	Age	Song	Kahn	Lira	Bobby	Karen
1	Mbijana Sibisi	24	"Redemption Song"	-	-	✔	✔
2	Marcel de Almeida	22	"Push Me to the Floor"	-	-	✔	✔
3	Thembeka Mnguni	32	"Brand New Me"	-	✔	✔	✔
4	Gavin Welsh	38	N/A	-	-	-	-
5	Thato Burhali Reynolds	N/A	N/A	-	-	-	
6	Joanna Abatzoglou	N/A	N/A	-	-	-	-
7	El Clay	25	"I'm Not the Only One"	✔	✔	✔	✔
8	Jessica Martins	18	"Pompeii"	✔	-	✔	✔
9	Prime Zulu	27	"Give Me One Reason"	✔	✔	✔	✔
10	Jeremy Olivier	40	"All of Me"	✔	✔	✔	✔
