= Riana Nel =

Namibian singer and songwriter (born 1981)

- Born: Riana Heletje Nel; 9 November 1981 (age 44); Windhoek, Namibia
- Genres: Pop; country; contemporary Christian music
- Occupations: Singer; songwriter; actress
- Years active: 2001–present
- Labels: Coleske Artists; Maranatha Record Company
- Website: riananel.co.za

Riana Nel (9 November 1981) is a Namibian singer and songwriter. After growing up in Windhoek she moved to Pretoria, South Africa, to start her career.

== Professional career ==
Her songs have been described as including elements of "pop & country". She firmly placed her roots in gospel music with the release of the albums Oopmond, The Cure, Breathe and Someone with Skin and has won several awards including the Crescendo Award in 2000, a SAMA, Huisgenoot tempo's and Ghoema awards. The album Die Moeite Werd appealed more to the secular market and has reached platinum status and continues to top South African music charts. Nel has also starred in the Afrikaans movie, 'n Saak van Geloof alongside her co-star Robbie Wessels, the well acclaimed South African singer-songwriter and comedian.

As a songwriter, Nel has written songs for Juanita Du Plessis, Bobby Van Jaarsveld, Lianie May, Touch of Class, and Amira Willighagen. Nel has shared a stage with her sister Nianell, Bobby van Jaarsveld, Lianie May, Lira and more. She recorded duets with André Swiegers (Blou), Bobby van Jaarsveld (Die Liefde kom net eens in 'n Leeftyd), Die Heuwels Fantasties (Doen net wat ons wil), Retief Burger (U's my God) and Steve Hofmeyr (Skree).

She has performed in South Africa, Namibia, France, the Netherlands, the UK, Nashville in the U.S., Russia, Mozambique and Australia.

Nel was a coach on The Voice South Africa in 2019.

== Personal life ==
Nel's sister, Nianell, is also a singer–songwriter.

== Discography ==
=== Studio albums ===
List of albums, with selected chart positions
| Title | Details | Peak positions | Ref |
| Title | Details | SA | Ref |
|---|---|---|---|
| Oopmond | Release date: 2001; Label: Maranatha Record Company; Formats: CD, digital download | — | |
| The Cure | Release date: 2003; Label: Maranatha Record Company; Formats: CD, digital download | — | |
| Someone with Skin | Release date: 2005; Label: Maranatha Record Company; Formats: CD, digital download | — | |
| Breathe – The Gospel Collection | Release date: 2006; Label: Maranatha Record Company; Formats: CD, digital download | — | |
| Die Moeite Werd | Release date: 2011; Label: Coleske Artists; Formats: CD, digital download | 14 | |
| Die Regte Tyd | Release date: 2014; Label: Coleske Artists; Formats: CD, digital download | 1 | |
| Jy Sal Weet | Release date: 2017; Label: Coleske Artists; Formats: CD, digital download | 2 | |
| Sterker | Release date: 2019; Label: Coleske Artists; Formats: CD, digital download | 1 | |
"—" denotes releases that did not chart.
