= Eden (South African band) =

South African band

- Origin: Johannesburg, South Africa
- Genres: Pop
- Years active: 1997–present
- Label: Jukebox Records
- Members: Jay (Jaco du Plessis); Paulo (Paulo Azevedo); Sean (Sean Else)
- Past members: Johan (Johan Vorster)

Eden is a South African pop band. Originally made up of Jay, Paulo, Johan, and Sean, the band debuted during the popular South African Aardklop Festival followed by a tour all over South Africa releasing their album In in 1997. After Sean left the boy band continued as a trio. Since 2003, the band has released three more albums, Point of No Return (2003), Eden (2006) and Knieë Lam (2008), a live DVD Live at The Mardi Gras (2008) and a compilation album Dekade (2009). They are signed to Coleske Artists.

The debut was with the limited edition album release titled In on the local label Volstruis Plate. The official national debut release was the album Point of No Return on Select Music / Jukebox Records / Coleske Artists / Sony Music / Sheer. It was a huge hit that went three times platinum in South Africa The self-titled album Eden on Coleske Artists went double platinum. Eden sings a variety of power pop and soft melody ballads, both in Afrikaans language and in English, the latter mostly comprising covers of well-known hits.

In 2025 with original artists, Jay, Paulo and Sean reunited, and released two new singles, 'Kom klop weer' and 'Gee my'.

== Members ==
- Jay – full name Jaco du Plessis (singer, actor, model)
- Paulo – full name Paulo Azevedo (singer, musician, sound engineer, stage producer)
- Johan – full name Johan Vorster (singer, songwriter, producer)

Former member

- Sean – full name Sean Else (singer, scriptwriter, playwright, film director, film producer)

== Awards ==
Eden has won many music awards including:

- Three nominations for South African Music Awards (SAMA) for album Point of No Return.
- Winner of "Best Pop Album" at the South African Music Awards (SAMA) for album Eden
- Two other nominations at the SAMA Awards for Eden
- Two Tempo Awards by Huisgenoot popular magazine for "Favourite Pop Group" and "Favourite Pop Album" for Eden
- The Vonk Muziek Award for "Best Group Album"
- Nominated for People/Mense Crystal Awards for "Best South African Group"
- MK Award for Sexiest Group

== Solo projects ==
In 2011, the band announced that it was taking a hiatus, allowing each individual member to pursue various projects, with the agreement that this was not a break-up and that the band would come together for a new album later on.

Band members have been known to be very active with their side projects in their fields of expertise.

=== Jay (Jaco du Plessis) ===
Jaco du Plessis also known by the stage name Jay is the most visible and media-savvy of the band. Considered a sex symbol, he has performed on stage with international acts like The Corrs, Bono, Ronan Keating and Westlife. He has also developed a very successful solo singing career. His beginnings were with theatre. Then he took part as a solo act, and won the annual South African Crescendo award for Afrikaans music organised by ATKV (the Afrikaans Language and Culture Association, in Afrikaans Afrikaanse Taal- en Kultuurvereniging). The win was jointly with another contestant named Joe Niemand. Following that, he released a solo album that earned two nominations for the local GMT Awards winning the title for "Best Pop Album".

==== Stage and theatre ====
He was very active on stage in theatrical performances. His debut was with Neil Lessick in the musical Let's Rock in 1999 as a lead singer and was an actor under study for South African State Theatre production of Joseph and the Amazing Technicolor Dreamcoat. Immediately after that he appeared in The Rocky Horror Picture Show, a member of the DooWah Boys and a lead role in pantomime in A Lad in a Lamp for which he was nominated for an acting prize. Years later he would appear yet again in Janice Honeyman's local remake of Aladdin.

==== Album SOLO ====
In 2010, with his band Eden taking a break, Jaco du Plessis released a popular solo album titled SOLO, that sold more than 40,000 copies and gained platinum status in South Africa. the album was in the making for three years starting 2007, with most materials written by Ewald Coleske with additional co-writing by Jay and Reana Nel. Some materials were also contributed by Dewald Wasserfall and by Johan Vorster, the latter his colleague in Eden.

The debut single was "Is ek nie die een". Notable tracks were "Melanie" also used in Platteland, and two duets with Lianie May. Jay was awarded as a solo act two Tempo Awards by the popular Huisgenoot magazine for "Best Pop Album" and for "Song of the Year" for his single solo release "Melanie". Music video for "Toe Stop My Hart" was nominated for Huisgenoot Tempo award for "Best Music Video of the Year". Jay was also nominated for two South African Music Awards (SAMA) nominations in 2010 for "Best Pop Album" and "Best Newcomer" (as a solo act).

Starting 2011, he concentrated his efforts with Eden, in preparation for their big launch with the massive album success Point of No Return.

==== Duo Jay en Lianie May ====
Besides his solo and band acts, Jay has also cooperated with the South African singer Lianie May forming a duet called Jay en Lianie. They had released a 2012 joint duets album together called Bonnie en Clyde including 16 tracks most notably the songs "Toe Stop my Hart" and "In a Moment Like This".

==== In Platteland ====
Jaco du Plessis also took part in a major South African musical drama film Platteland co-written by Deon Opperman and by Sean Else, an earlier member of Eden who also produced and directed the film. The film premiered on screen on 12 November 2011. Jay plays in the film the role of Jakes Ferreira, the son of Mike Ferreira which is played by singer, songwriter and actor Steve Hofmeyr. The film also stars Lianie May as Riana van Niekerk and Bok van Blerk as Dirk Pretorius. The song "Melanie" sung by Jay is on the soundtrack and one of the contemporary music hits woven in the storyline of Platteland with other popular tunes included "Tyd om te Trek" from Bok van Blerk, "Vergeet My Nie" by Lianie May, "Pa en Seun" by Steve Hofmeyr and Bok van Blerk and "Sweet Dreams" by Karlien van Jaarsveld.

==== Commercial endorsements ====
He has signed a contract with the brand "Lee Cooper" and is the official face of the firm for its jeans wear and perfume series in South Africa.

==== Album #DisHoeOnsRol ====
In 2013, he released a new solo album titled #DisHoeOnsRol.

=== Johan (Johan Vorster) ===
Johan Vorster, the vocalist and songwriter of the band started music very early and studied piano and guitar. He studied music at Universiteit van Potchefstroom and joined the boy band Eden in the late 1990s writing most of the band's big hits including "Is Jy Bang", "54 5de Straat" and "Lyf teen Lyf".

==== Songwriting and producing / Mozi Records ====
In 2005, he co-founded Mozi Records with Sean Else, a fellow band member. Bok van Blerk was signed to the label. Vorster co-wrote and co-produced most of the album De la Rey with Sean Else and Johan Rautenbach which became the biggest selling original Afrikaans record of all time. Johan was the co-writer of the van Blerk song "De la Rey". The song was mentioned on the front page of the New York Times because of its controversial content. He also co-wrote and produced Bok van Blerk's second album, Tyd om te Trek, an album that won the SAMA (South African Music Award) for best-selling album in South-Africa for 2009/2010.

In 2006 Mozi Records signed their first female artist, Lianie May. Vorster co-wrote and co-produced her album, also writing the song "Jy soen my nie meer nie". Her album became the most sold album by an Afrikaans female artist. It won the SAMA (South African Music Award) for the top selling album. In 2008, Vorster won the Huisgenoot Tempo award for "Songwriter of the Year" for the song.

==== Sports anthems ====
Vorster teamed up with Coleske Artists and Sean Else as co-writer for the song "Ons vir Jou Suid-Afrika" used for 2007 Rugby World Cup. South Africa won the championship trophy earning the album the Huisgenoot Tempo award for "Best Afrikaans Compilation Album". Johan and Coleske Artists co-wrote and produced the new album Rugby is Groot for the 2011 Rugby World Cup campaign.

==== Songwriting and producing / Johan Vorster Songs ====
While at Mozi Records, he established his own "Johan Vorster Songs" publishing firm in 2009, holding all rights to his songs. In the second half of 2010, he resigned from Mozi Records, continuing on his own with his record company and publishing house, Johan Vorster Songs. The firm also includes Andre Odendaal developing and directing film and theatre projects and Jenny Griesel as media and marketing specialist.

In 2010, he signed Karlien van Jaarsveld to his new company. With her album Jakkals trou met wolf se vrou with the label, she won the Huisgenoot Tempo award for "Best Newcomer" in 2011. In 2012, he signed Dewald Wasserfall, and wrote the hit song "Eendag as ons groot is" which has reached number 1 on the charts of several radio stations. Johan Vorster Songs has also exclusively signed Lisa Katzke and as a joint venture with Coleske Artists, Jannie Moolman.

Vorster wrote for the duo Lianie en Jay, notably "Toe Stop My Hart". Johan has also written "Juliet" performed by Steve Hofmeyr, "Net voor die storm kom" performed by Theuns Jordaan, "'n Vrou wild dit hoor" by Bobby Van Jaarsveld co-winner of the Ghoema 2013 "Song of the Year" award and "Melanie" performed by his Eden team colleague Jay (Jaco du Plessis) winning the Huisgenoot Tempo award for "Song of the Year" in 2011.

With Coleske Artists, Johan wrote tens of chart topping songs and produced the Afrikaans is Groot compilation albums series.

==== Musicals and films ====
Vorster also co-wrote the musical score for the locally produced musicals, Ons vir Jou, Jock of the bushveld and Shaka Zulu – The Musical, a theatre piece about the rise and fall of the legendary Shaka Zulu, that got staged in the Nelson Mandela Theatre and the State Theatre in Pretoria in 2008, 2009 and 2010.

He wrote most of the musical score for the South African Afrikaans film Platteland released in November 2011, featuring, Lianie May, Bok vam Blerk, Karlien and Jay. He produced a follow-up musical film As Jy Sing released in November 2013.

=== Paulo (Paulo Azevedo) ===
Paulo Azevedo born in Cape Town is a formally trained singer and musician who also plays the piano, guitar and saxophone. He studied computer programming at Kaapse Technikon, established as a young man his own sound, lighting and staging company and after school hours sang at various venues during his youth. He was a founding member of the band with Didi Kriel and began writing some materials. Fascinated by the success of American and British boy bands, soon others joined in to render it a four-piece band. He also has expertise as a sound engineer and has cooperated with various artists like Mathys Roets, Danie Niehaus, Johannes Kerkorrel and the Coleske-broers. He also does stage production and has toured with various artists.

=== Sean Else ===
Sean Else obtained his diploma in Drama at the Technikon Pretoria (now known as the Tshwane University of Technology). Starting his career off as an actor, he appeared in numerous award-winning stage productions and also appeared in more than 30 films and television series.

Sean was one of the founding members of Eden. After leaving the band in 2006, he started his own record label and production company, Mozi Records/Mozi Films with his songwriting partner, Johan Vorster.

He found and co-produced the multi-platinum-selling artists, Bok Van Blerk and Lianie May. He also found and co-produced the up-and- coming artist, Vaughan Gardiner. These artists' sensational achievements include numerous awards, amongst others, the South African Music Award for top selling artist in 2009 to Lianie May and in 2010 to Bok Van Blerk. As songwriter, Sean partnered on many hit songs, including: “De La Rey”, "Ons Vir Jou Suid-Afrika", "Tyd Om Te Trek" and "Die Kaplyn". Music videos for these songs, which Sean produced and directed, have also won Sean numerous “Music Video of the Year” awards.

Sean was also the producer and co-director of big theatre hit shows, "My Vrou se Man se Vrou" (Run For Your Wife by Ray Cooney), "My Boetie se Sussie se Ou" (Caught in the Net by Ray Cooney) and "As die Kat weg is... "

Sean was also co-writer with the award-winning playwright, Deon Opperman, on the musicals, "Ons Vir Jou", "Shaka Zulu", "Jock of the Bushveld" and "Lied van my hart". "Ons Vir Jou" became the most successful Afrikaans musical ever. Due to popular demand it returned to the stage for the third time in three years in June 2012.

Sean's aim and goal throughout his whole career has been to make feature films and in 2011 he formed his film production company, Collective Dream Films and co-wrote, co-produced, directed and edited his first feature film, Platteland. The film starred the biggest selling stars in South Africa. On its opening weekend it became the biggest grossing Afrikaans film ever. The film was the highest grossing South African film in 2011.

In January 2012 Sean and his partners purchased the old Waterfront Studios in Cape Town and their vision and aims are to use their knowledge and understanding to produce local and international films and television series. Their recent productions include: Spud 2 (starring John Cleese) and The Perfect Wave (starring Scott Eastwood). He has also written and directed the critically acclaimed feature films, "Blood and Glory" and "'n Man soos my Pa”

With his partner (Rudy Halgryn) at Collective Dream Films, they branched out and opened offices in London and Mauritius as well where Sean continues his creation of film and television content and has several international projects in active development.

== Discography of Eden ==
Albums

Title	Album details	Notes
In	Year released: 1997; Record label: Volstruis Plate; Ref: VVOLCD 0002	Track list: 1. Hier By My; 2. Dink Jy Darem Nog Aan My?; 3. Hemel Toe; 4. Ek Hou Van Jou; 5. If; 6. I Want To Go There; 7. Hello Girl; 8. Diamante En Goud; 9. Here We Are; 10. Hemel Toe (Pop Planet mix); 11. Hier By My (Soft mix); 12. I Want To Go There (Housemix); 13. Hemel Toe (Sonic Diva's euro mix)
Point of No Return	Year released: 2003; Record label(s): Select / Jukebox / Coleske Artists / Sony Music / Sheer; Ref: SELBCD610; Credited: 3× Platinum (South Africa)	Track list: 1. Point of No Return; 2. I Got You; 3. I Won't Let You Go; 4. You Are The One; 5. Play Me Right; 6. Promise Me; 7. Catch Me; 8. When Your Angels Fall; 9. Baby, Baby; 10. It's All Because of You; 11. Cry on More; 12. Amazed (Bonus)
Eden	Year released: 2006; Record label: Jukebox Records; Ref: CDJUKE 06; Credited: 2× Platinum (South Africa)	Track list: 1. 54 5de Straat; 2. Aan Jou Vas; 3. Terugdraai; 4. Nogsteeds By Jou; 5. Is Jy Bang?; 6. Myne Vir Vanaand; 7. As Ek Voor Jou Breek; 8. How Do You Leave?; 9. Running Away; 10. Bright New Day; 11. I Am The One And Only; 12. Without Your Love; 13. Little Bit of Love; 14. Always; 15. Aan Jou Vas (Remix)
Knieë Lam	Year released: 2008; Record label: Jukebox Records; Ref: CDJUKE 11	Track list: 1. Vra My; 2. Knieë Lam; 3. Lyf Teen Lyf; 4. Aai Ja Jaai; 5. Kwart Oor Vyf; 6. Honky Tonk; 7. Bly in My Hart; 8. Hurt So Good; 9. I Don't Know Much; 10. What Hurts The Most; 11. Maak Jou Myne; 12. Into Me; 13. Head Over Heels met Lianie May; 14. Because It's Love

Compilation albums

Title	Album details	Notes
Dekade	Year released: 2009; Record label: Jukebox Records; Ref: CDJUKE 16; Type: Compilation album	Track list: 1. Dans Vir My vetseun 2. So Klink 'n Hart; 3. Lig in My Lewe; 4. Net Een Oomblik; 5. Is Jy Bang?; 6. 54 5de Straat; 7. Knieë Lam; 8. Vra My; 9. Aan Jou Vas; 10. Lyf Teen Lyf; 11. Terugdraai; 12. Blessed; 13. Lay Down Beside Me; 14. How Do You Leave?; 15. Point of No Return; 16. Head Over Heels; 17. Because It's Love; 18. What Hurts The Most; 19. I Am The One And Only; 20. Amazed; 21. I Got You

DVD (live)

Title	Album details	Notes
Live at The Mardi Gras	Year released: 2008; Record label: Jukebox Records; Ref: DVDJUKE 05	Track list: 1. Bright New Day; 2. Baby, Baby; 3. Catch Me; 4. I Won't Let You Go; 5. Promise Me; 6. When Your Angels Fall; 7. You Are The One; 8. Dink Jy Darem Nog Aan My?; 9. Always; 10. Love Will Keep Us Alive; 11. Ek Hou Van Jou; 12. It's All Because of You; 13. Point of No Return; 14. Play Me Right; 15. Little Bit of Love; 16. I Got You; 17. Amazed

== Discography: Members of Eden ==
Jay (Jaco du Plessis)

- 2010: SOLO (solo)
- 2012: Bonnie en Clyde (duo as Jay en Lianie)
- 2013: #DisHoeOnsRol (solo)Dou
