= Van Jaarsveld =

Van Jaarsveld is an Afrikaans surname. Notable people with the surname include:

- Bobby van Jaarsveld (born 1987), South African singer
- Martin van Jaarsveld (born 1974), South African cricketer
- Torsten van Jaarsveld (born 1987), South African rugby union player
- Vaughn van Jaarsveld (born 1985), South African cricketer
