= The Voice South Africa =

- Created by: John de Mol Jr.
- Presented by: Anele Mdoda; Lungile Radu; Stacy Norman
- Judges: Kahn Morbee; Lira; Bobby van Jaarsveld; Karen Zoid; Riky Rick; Riana Nel; Francois Van Coke
- Country of origin: South Africa
- Original language: English
- No. of seasons: 3

Original release
- Network: M-Net
- Release: 31 January 2016 – 7 July 2019

Related
- The Voice (franchise)

The Voice South Africa is a South African reality singing competition and local version of The Voice first broadcast as The Voice of Holland. Its first season started on 31 January 2016 and proved to be a hit on M-Net. The second season started on 5 February 2017 on the same channel. The third season premiered on 3 February 2019.

The original coaching panel of the show consists of Kahn Morbee, Lira, Bobby van Jaarsveld, and Karen Zoid. Lungile Radu and Stacy Norman were the original hosts. Season 3 saw a change in the coaching panel, replacing previous coaches and hosts. Lira is the only remaining coach being joined by Afrikaans singer Riana Nel, rapper Riky Rick and rocker Francois Van Coke. Anele Mdoda is the current host.

== Coaches and hosts ==
Shortly after the announcement of the production of The Voice South Africa, the panellists were revealed with Kahn Morbee, Lira, Bobby van Jaarsveld, and Karen Zoid as coaches; and Lungile Radu and Stacy Norman as hosts. The coaching panel and hosts remain unchanged for season 2, which aired in 2017.

On 29 August 2018, M-Net renewed The Voice South Africa for a third season. On 2 November 2018, Anele Mdoda confirmed to become the new host for season 3. Four days later, it was announced that Riky Rick would become a new coach for the third season, followed by Riana Nel on 7 November and Francois Van Coke on 9 November. On 8 November 2018 Lira confirmed to be returning to the show for her third season as coach.

Coaches gallery

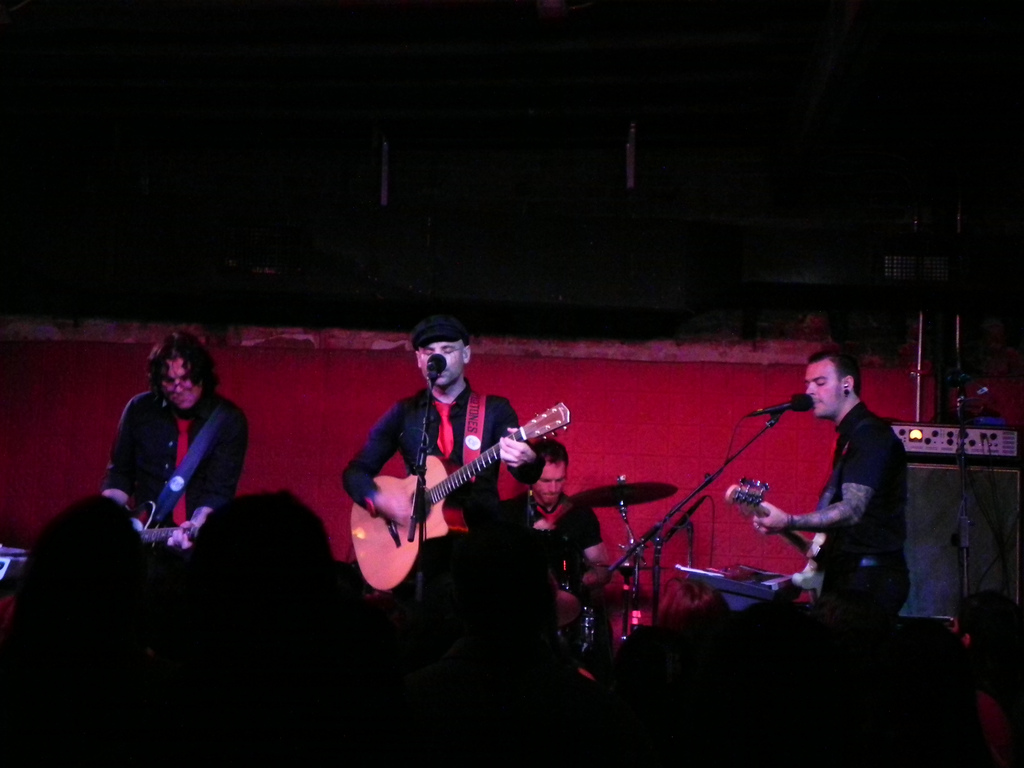
Kahn Morbee (2016–2017)

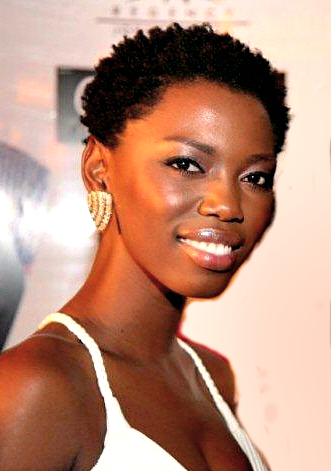
Lira (2016–2019)

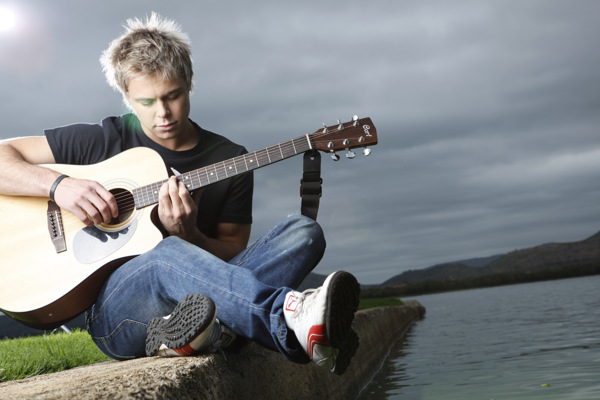
Bobby van Jaarsveld (2016–2017)

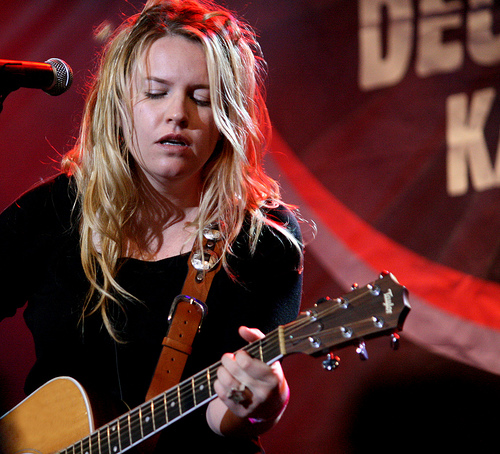
Karen Zoid (2016–2017)

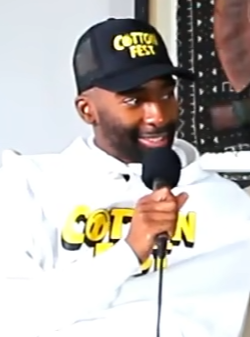
Riky Rick^{†} (2019)

Riana Nel (2019)

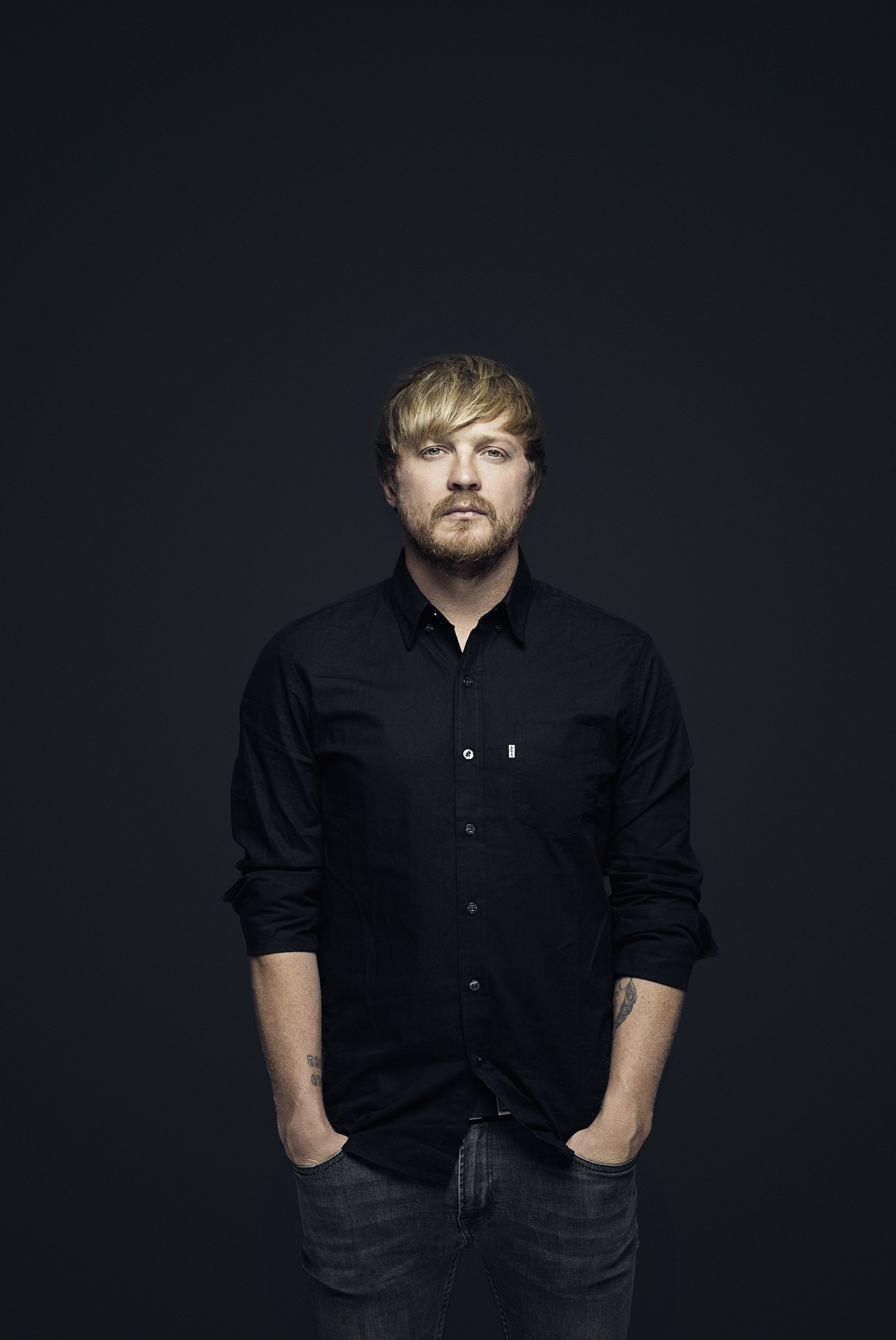
Francois Van Coke (2019)

=== Timeline of coaches and hosts ===
Coach	Seasons		
Coach	1	2	3
Lira			
Kahn Morbee			
Bobby van Jaarsveld			
Karen Zoid			
Francois Van Coke			
Riana Nel			
Riky Rick^{†}			
Host	Seasons		
Host	1	2	3
Lungile Radu			
Stacy Norman			
Anele Mdoda			
Elana Afrika			

=== Coaches' advisors ===
Season	Team Kahn	Team Lira	Team Bobby	Team Karen
1	Vicky Sampson	Nianell	Toya Delazy	Zolani Mahola
2	Elvis Blue	Riana Nel	Jimmy Nevis	Emo Adams
Season	Team Riky^{†}	Team Lira	Team Francois	Team Riana
3	Khaya Mthethwa	Ross Learmonth	Majozi	Jo Black

== Series overview ==
Colour Key

Team Kahn
Team Lira
Team Bobby
Team Karen
Team Riky^{†}
Team Riana
Team Francois

Season	First aired	Last aired	Winner	Runner-up	Third place	Fourth place	Fifth place	Winning coach	Hosts	Coaches (chairs' order)			
Season	First aired	Last aired	Winner	Runner-up	Third place	Fourth place	Fifth place	Winning coach	Hosts	1	2	3	4
1	Jan 31, 2016	May 22, 2016	Richard Stirton	Gavin Edwards	Jeremy Olivier	Almur Marais	No fifth finalist	Kahn Morbee	Lungile Radu, Stacy Norman	Kahn	Lira	Bobby	Karen
2	Feb 5, 2017	July 9, 2017	Craig Lucas	Josh Ansley	Samantha Leonard	Caroline Brussow	Luke Lovemore	Kahn Morbee	Lungile Radu, Stacy Norman	Kahn	Karen	Lira	Bobby
3	Feb 3, 2019	July 7, 2019	Tasché Burger	Sone Joubert	Siki Jo-An Qwazi	The PJ Twins	Eon Cloude Le Roux	Francois Van Coke	Anele Mdoda, Elana Afrika	Riky	Riana	Lira	Francois

=== Coaches' teams ===
Winner
Runner-up
Third place
Fourth place

- Winners are in bold, finalists are italicized, and eliminated contestants in small font

Season	Kahn Morbee	Lira	Bobby van Jaarsveld	Karen Zoid
1	**Richard Stirton**; Francis Bowers; Clemour Ngobeni; Prime Zulu	Jeremy Olivier; Zoë Modiga; Robin Peters; Jono Johansen	Gavin Edwards; Vernon Barnard; Austin Lurring; Xanilee Hammond	Almur Marais; Thembeka Mnguni; Jono Grayson; Thapelo Lekoane
2	**Craig Lucas**; Fatman; Freddy Lalendle; Zikhona "Zee" Gqamana	Karen Zoid	Lira	Bobby van Jaarsveld
2	**Craig Lucas**; Fatman; Freddy Lalendle; Zikhona "Zee" Gqamana	Samantha Leonard; PJ Pretorius; Amanda Faku; Lindo Sithole	Luke Lovemore; Tender Mavundla; Bubbles Mnomiya; Marissa Petzer	Josh Ansley; Caroline-Grace Brüssow; Marco Basson; John-James Janse
3	Riky Rick^{†}	Riana Nel	The PJ Twins; Yahto Kraft; Sbu Dludlu; Krista Jones	Francois Van Coke
3	Eon Le Roux; Amy Tjasink; Ross Charles; Aura	Sone Joubert; Siki Jo-An Qwazi; Lelo Ramasimong; Elisha James; Francois Viljoen	The PJ Twins; Yahto Kraft; Sbu Dludlu; Krista Jones	**Tasché Burger**; Anslin Gysman; Chezelle Shahadat; Daniel Jay

== Season synopses ==
=== Season 1 (2016) ===
The first season of The Voice South Africa began airing on 31 January 2016 on M-Net. The season was hosted by Lungile Radu with Stacy Norman as the V-Reporter, and are joined by coaches Kahn Morbee, Lira, Bobby van Jaarsveld, and Karen Zoid. Richard Stirton won the first season on 22 May 2016.

=== Season 2 (2017) ===
The second season of The Voice South Africa began airing on 5 February 2017 on M-Net. The coaches and hosts remained the same as last season. Eight live shows were conducted this season, with five contestants advanced to the Grand Finale. For the sake of fairness and transparency, M-Net nullified the votes after the Semifinal. As M-Net could not determine with certainty whether misconduct took place regarding paid-for marketing in the previous two weeks, two contestants eliminated in week 4 and 5 were brought back to the show, bringing a total of 7 finalists. Craig Lucas won the season beating fan favorite Josh Ansley.

=== Season 3 (2019) ===
The third season of The Voice South Africa began airing on 3 February 2019 on M-Net, with returning coach Lira and new coaches Riky Rick†, Riana Nel, Francois Van Coke as well as new host Anele Mdoda. Five artists advanced to the Grand Finale, with fan favorite Tasché Burger from team Francois crowned the winner. Sone Joubert and Siki Jo-An Qwazi, both from team Riana, finished in second and third place, respectively, while The PJ Twins and Eon Claude le Roux rounded up the top 5.
