= Kerry Lee =

- Born: November 15, 1989 (age 36)
- Origin: South Africa
- Genres: Afrikaans / English Modern & Traditional Country
- Occupation: Singer
- Years active: 2009–present
- Labels: Independent
- Website: www.kerrylee.co.za

Kerry Lee is an Afrikaans singer with a Modern Country sound.

Lee was born on 15 November 1989 in Durban. Her debut album "Vou Jou Arms Om My" recorded by Anton Botha was released in 2010.

In 2009 she sang the theme song for “Love & Mortar” on DSTV channel 182, followed by the theme song for “Street Rods Africa” in 2010.

In 2012 Lee released a new single "Met Ringe en Woorde"". This song was a hit on radio stations in South Africa.

In 2013 Lee and Hugo Ludik, founder of the South African group ADAM and director of Muse Productions, released two singles "Shut Up en Soen My" & "Kaalvoet Boerseun".

Lee and songwriters Vaughn Gardiner and Roux Cloete released the album "Dans in die Reën".

== Awards and recognition ==
Lee was nominated for two Ghoema Music Awards in 2017: Best Country Album, and Publi'cs Favourite Female Artist.

== Discography ==
- Vou Jou Arms Om My, 2010
- Dans in die Reën, 2016
