= My Angel (song) =

Single by Romanz

from the album With All My Heart
- Released: 28 December 2012
- Genre: Vocal; pop
- Length: 3:22
- Label: Select Music
- Songwriter(s): Niel Schoombee; Sean Butler

Music video
- "My Angel" on YouTube

"My Angel" is the debut single by the pop/opera vocal quartet Romanz. The song was released on 28 December 2012, it was released via Select Music Records.

== Background ==
The song was recorded in 2011 with Nianell on their joint project together 'N Duisend Drome. It was released as the Afrikaans version My Engel. In 2012 the song was re-recorded in English and was released as their debut worldwide single.

== Music video ==
The music video for the song was released on October 12, 2012. The music video includes cuts of all four members. The video has over thirteen thousand views on YouTube.
