= Karlien van Jaarsveld =

South African singer

- Born: 21 December 1985 (age 40); Paarl, South Africa
- Genre: Afrikaans pop
- Occupation: Singer
- Years active: 2005–present

Karlien van Jaarsveld (born 21 December 1985) is a South African singer-songwriter. Her debut album, As die Gordyn val, was released in 2010. Previously a member of a rock group, she is now a solo artist who has won several awards in South Africa.

== Early life ==
Karlien van Jaarsveld was born on 21 December 1985, in Paarl, South Africa, the eldest of three children. Her brother, Bobby van Jaarsveld, is also a singer and she started performing with him in 2005 as his guitarist and background singer. She also sang a duet with her brother on his first album.

== Career ==
=== Music ===
Van Jaarsveld formed a rock band, Revolution (Revolusie), in 2006 and was its lead singer. In October 2008, she left the band to start a solo career. Her debut album, As die Gordyn val, was released in 2010. Her second album, Jakkals Trou Met Wolf Se Vrou (Jackal Marries Wolf's Wife), was released in 2011. The album's sales reached platinum status in South Africa. In that year she won the Huisgenoot Tempo Award for Afrikaans music, as Best Newcomer. In 2012 she won three awards at the Ghoema Music Awards, for Female Artist of the Year, Pop Record of the Year, and Music Video of the Year. In 2014 she won the South African Music Award for best Pop album in Afrikaans.

In April 2017, her single "Sing vir liefde" peaked at number 5 on the Maroela Media Afrikaanse Top-20 chart of top-selling Afrikaans singles in South Africa. In November 2018, her single "Rooilipsoene" peaked at number 2 on the Maroela Media Afrikaanse Top-20 chart. In December 2019, another single, "Stiltes", peaked at number 4 on the same chart. Her next single, "Ruil jou vir my", peaked at number 2 on the Maroela Media Afrikaanse Top-20 chart in May 2020. In October 2022, she topped the Maroela Media Afrikaanse Top-20 chart with the single "Ophou". She returned to the charts with "Als is Okay" peaking at number 3 in November 2023. In July 2024, her single "Katrientjie Katryn" peaked at number 5 on the same charts.

She has also collaborated with several artists. In 2022, she and Jacob Swann released their duet "Lief". Their single peaked at number 5 one the Maroela Media Afrikaanse Top-20 chart. In 2023, she performed the song with Riaan Benadé at Sun City, for the Afrikaans is Groot concert. In October 2023, she collaborated with Robbie Wessels Anlia Star and Ruhan du Toit, with the single "Saam Suid-Afrika", in support of the South Africa national rugby union team. The song peaked at number 7 on the Maroela Media Afrikaanse Top-20 chart. In March 2024, she released a new single, "Beter Vir Ons Albei", with singer Joshua na die Reën. They performed the song on Jacaranda FM and a rendition of Rod Stewart's "Forever Young". Their single peaked at number 17 on the Maroela Media Afrikaanse Top-20 chart. In October of the same year, she released a new single. "Ek Verstaan" is a duet with Dodo Nyoka. In October, it became the top-selling Afrikaans single in South Africa, topping the Maroela Media Afrikaanse Top-20 chart. In December, her collaboration, "Alaska", with Jan Bloukaas, entered the Maroela Media Afrikaanse Top-20 chart at number 20, in the wake of his death.

=== Additional work ===
In 2011, Van Jaarsveld appeared in the Afrikaans movie Platteland with Steve Hofmeyr, Bok van Blerk, and Lianie May. In 2014 she appeared in the television soap opera Binnelanders. And in 2015 she appeared as Cinderella in the theatre.

In 2015 she won season 8 of the South African version of Strictly Come Dancing, together with her partner, Devon Snell.

Between 2017 and 2019, she and her brother, Bobby, were the subjects of the Showmax reality series Bobby & Karlien: In Jou Skoene. In each episode, the siblings spend 48 hours with people that have fallen on hard times or face other immense challenges in their lives.

In 2022, together with Ruan Scheepers, they won the tenth season of Tropika Island of Treasure on SABC 3.

== Personal life ==
In 2013, she married the rugby player Derick Hougaard. The following year, Hougaard played her love interest in the music video for her single, "Ek wil nie kwaad gaan slaap nie". They divorced in 2016. They have two sons together.

She married Joe Breytenbach, a former rugby player, in 2017. They have a daughter and a son. In 2018, Breytenbach and actress Simoné Nortmann starred in the music video for van Jaarsveld's single "Rooilipsoene".

== Discography ==
Van Jaarsveld's albums have been:

- 2010: As die gordyn val
- 2011: Jakkals Trou met Wolf se Vrou
- 2013: Uitklophou
- 2015: My hartjie
- 2017: Sing vir liefde
- 2018: Die Beste Tot Nou

== Filmography ==
- Platteland (2011)
- As Jy Sing (2013)
