= Ghoema Music Awards =

Annual South African event

- Ghoema Music Awards Logo
- Awarded for: Excellence in the Afrikaans music industry
- Country: South Africa
- Presented by: Ghoema Music Trust
- First award: 11 March 2012

The Ghoema Music Awards is an annual South African award ceremony that recognises outstanding achievement in the Afrikaans music industry. It is the only independent music award ceremony of its kind in South Africa. The event was established in 2012 and the awards are presented by the Ghoema Trust. The ceremony is held in March every year, and contenders are judged on performances made in the previous year. The show broadcasts on KykNET.

== History ==
The awards were founded in 2012 by Barry Pretorius.

The Ghoema Music Award came under heavy criticism in 2019 when the decision was made to remove the hit song "Die Land", sung by various artists, thereby blocking any recognition the song has achieved. The public was outraged and peer artists who won at the Awards made it clear that "Die Land" would have won was it not for political meddling in Afrikaans music by the Ghoemas. A rival music Award event was organised by civil society and in October 2019 the new music award event named, Aitsas, was held and all artists were included. "Die Land" did win that year at the Aitsas.

== Name ==
A ghoema (Dutch pronunciation: [ˈɡumaː]) is a barrel-shaped drum, originally played by Cape Malay people and commonly associated with the Cape Minstrels. It produces rhythmic sounds and beats that are uplifting, and described by the Minstrels as colourful.

== Description ==
The Ghoema Music Awards ("Ghoemas") are the official independent awards ceremony where artists, bands, musicians and songwriters of the Afrikaans music industry are honoured for certain achievements over a specific period.

The Ghoemas function without the attribution of any exclusive brands or copyrights and are independent of the national press, media, and record companies. Record companies and the press and media work together in partnership to promote the Ghoema Music Awards, ensure that the awards are executed and to ensure that the awards get the necessary exposure as agreed upon by all parties involved.

The Ghoema Music Awards accolades are made after a free and fair consistent enrolment process, nominations, followed by a voting process which includes public voting and a judging panel consisting of industry experts. An accredited auditing firm is responsible for all ballot papers, from both the elected judges and public votes, to ensure the voting process is transparent.

The Ghoema Music Trust owns and manages the Ghoema Music Awards. Therefore, the awards ceremony and winners are beneficiaries of the trust.

== Trustees ==
The Trustees of The Ghoema Music Trust are represented by the following individuals:

1. Heidi Edeling – Chief Executive Officer
2. Frik Jordaan – Legal representative
3. Henico Schalekamp – Auditor/accountant
4. Karen Meiring
5. Loyiso Bala
6. Shihaam Domingo

== History ==
The first Ghoema Afrikaans Music Awards ceremony was held on 11 March 2012 at Carnival City, Johannesburg, South Africa to honour musical accomplishments by performers in the Afrikaans market for the year 2011.

== Categories ==
- Newcomer of the Year
- Male Artist of the Year
- Female Artist of the Year
- Group of the Year
- Record of the Year
- Song of the Year
- Contemporary Record of the Year
- Gospel Record of the Year
- Humour Record of the Year
- Children's Record of the Year
- Alternative Record of the Year
- Rock Record of the Year
- Traditional Record of the Year
- Instrumental Record of the Year
- Country Record of the Year
- Live DVD of the Year
- Live Ensemble DVD of the Year
- Music Video of the Year
- Songwriter of the Year
- Pop Record of the Year
- Honorary Award: Groundbreaking Delivery in the Music Industry
- Honorary Award: Lifetime Contribution in the Music Industry

== Winners ==
The Ghoema Awards conferred the following awards during the 2012 Ghoema Afrikaanse Musiek Toekenings awards ceremony:

- Newcomer of the Year – Adam (Liefdesoldaat)
- Male Artist of the Year – Steve Hofmeyr
- Female Artist of the Year – Karlien van Jaarsveld
- Group of the Year – Die Heuwels Fantasties
- Record of the Year – Wilder As Die Wildtuin : Die Heuwels Fantasties
- Song of the Year – Bobby van Jaarsveld (Kan Ek Met Jou Praat)
- Contemporary Record of the Year – Steve Hofmeyr (Haloda)
- Gospel Record of the Year – Juanita du Plessis (Wees Lig)
- Humour Record of the Year – Sorina Erasmus (Ek Watch Jou)
- Children's Record of the Year – Helena Smith (Luidkids 2)
- Alternative Record of the Year – Die Heuwels Fantasties (Wilder As Die Wildtuin)
- Rock Record of the Year – One Crown (Verander Vir Ander)
- Traditional Record of the Year – Die Penkoppe (Kan Nie Kla Nie)
- Instrumental Record of the Year – Charl Du Plessis (Shangai Brunch)
- Country Record of the Year – Sarah Theron (Storm in 'N D-Cup)
- Live DVD of the Year – Romanz (Ek Sal Getuig)
- Live Ensemble DVD of the Year – Verskeie Huisgenoot Skouspel
- Music Video of the Year – Karlien Van Jaarsveld (Jakkals Trou Met Wolf)
- Songwriter of the Year – Johan Vorster
- Pop-Record of the Year – Karlien Van Jaarsveld (Jakkals Trou Met Wolf)
- Honorary Award: Groundbreaking Delivery in the Music Industry- Boet Pretorius
- Honorary Award Lifetime Contribution in the Music Industry – Lance James
- Honorary Award Ghoema Diamond Award – Juanita Du Plessis & Steve Hofmeyr
