= My Angel =

My Angel may refer to:

- My Angel (2004 film), a French film directed by Serge Frydman
- My Angel (2011 film), a British Christmas film by Stephen Cookson
- My Angel (EP), a 1991 EP, or the title song, by Arcturus
- "My Angel" (song), a 2012 song by Romanz
- "My Angel", a song by Bobby Valentino from Bobby Valentino
- "My Angel", a song by Kellie Pickler from Small Town Girl
- "My Angel", a song by Prince Royce from Furious 7: Original Motion Picture Soundtrack
- "My Angel", a song by Rock Goddess from Rock Goddess
