= Ek Sal Getuig =

Studio album by Romanz
- Released: 1 April 2010
- Genre: Gospel/Christian
- Language: Afrikaans
- Label: Select Music

Romanz chronology
Bly Getrou (2009)	Ek Sal Getuig (2010)	'N Duisend Drome (2011)

Ek Sal Getuig is the third studio album by the pop/opera vocal quartet Romanz and their first Christian-debut album.

== Track listing ==
1. "Houtkruis"
2. "Ek Sal Getuig"
3. "You Raise Me Up (featuring Charlize Berg)"
4. "Sweef Soos 'N Arend"
5. "Hy'S Die Eerste En Laaste"
6. "Bridge Over Troubled Water"
7. "When A Child Is Born"
8. "Staan Op En Sing"
9. "Halleluja"
10. "Hier Is My Alles"
11. "From A Distance"
12. "U Is Daar"
13. "Gloryland"
14. "Hoe Groot Is U"
15. "Jerusalem"

== Charts ==
Chart (2010)	Peak position
South African Albums Chart	8

== Certifications ==
Country	Certifications
South Africa	Gold
