= Natasha Sutherland =

South African actress

- Born: Natasha Sutherland; 20 November 1970 (age 55); Durban, South Africa
- Occupations: Actress; motivational speaker; author
- Years active: 1991–present
- Spouse: Steve Hofmeyr (m. 1998; div. 2008)
- Children: 2

Natasha Sutherland (born 20 November 1970) is a South African actress. She is best known for her roles in the television serials Honeytown, Tarzan: The Epic Adventures and Scandal!. Apart from acting, she is also an author, motivational speaker and a counselor.

== Personal life ==
Sutherland was born on 20 November 1970, in Durban, South Africa, the daughter of choreographers Geoffrey Sutherland and Kenlynn Sutherland (formally Ashby).

Sutherland was married to Steve Hofmeyr, a South African singer, songwriter, and TV presenter. They married on 1998 and she later divorced acrimoniously in 2008 citing Steve's 10-year relationship with fitness instructor Janine van der Vyver. The couple has two sons: Benjamin and Sebastian.

== Career ==
Sutherland started her career in the early 1990s as a presenter of the children show Kideo. Then she acted in the soap opera, Egoli: Place of Gold during her teen age in 1991. In 1996, she started her acting career with the two television serials: Honeytown and Tarzan: The Epic Adventures. After the success of those serials, she acted in the home movie Operational Delta in 1997. Meanwhile, she started to dominate the South Africa theater with several popular stage plays such as Gigi in 1992 and The Revlon Girl. In the meantime, she also directed music videos and worked as an editor of Finesse Magazine.

Apart from acting, Sutherland is also a public motivational speaker who travelled across the country as well international stages. She is also appointed as the brand ambassador for the South African Beauty brand 'Placecol' and 'DNB'. She is also a prolific author, which she wrote her first book Bittersweet. With her success as an author, she later wrote the books: Green and Blue in 2010 (her first children's book), Fairytale and Sprokie.

== Filmography ==
Year	Film	Role	Genre
1991	Egoli: Place of Gold	Samantha Ryan du Plessis	TV series
1994	Honeytown	Carrie	TV series
1995	Honeytown II	Carrie	TV mini-series
1995	The Uninvited Guest	Mandy Thompson	TV series'
1997	Tarzan: The Epic Adventures	Dalen	TV series
1997	Operation Delta Force	Lt. Marie Junger	TV movie
1998	Wycliffe	Young Mum	TV series
2008–present	Scandal!	Layla McKenzie	TV series
2023	Binnelanders	Birdy	TV series
