= Jan Bloukaas =

South African singer (1999–2024)

- Born: Jean Prieur du Plessis; 7 October 1999; Monte Vista, Cape Town, South Africa
- Died: 3 December 2024 (aged 25); Cape Town, South Africa
- Occupation: Singer

Jean du Plessis (7 October 1999 – 3 December 2024), known professionally as Jan Bloukaas, was a South African singer born in Cape Town, South Africa.

== Career ==
Du Plessis shot to fame in 2017 when he released his song Kaas elke dag, with his 2018 album Lewe being nominated for a South African Music Award (SAMA) in the best Afrikaans pop album category. He released his second album, The Party Starter, in 2019, and his third album, Vreemdeling, in 2023. Du Plessis launched his final album, God Kan, on 27 November 2024. Several heavyweights in the Afrikaans music industry collaborated with Du Plessis on the last album, including Francois van Coke, Van Pletzen, Die Heuwels Fantasties and Karlien van Jaarsveld.

Du Plessis was diagnosed with brain cancer in 2022, and died on 3 December 2024, at the age of 25. His collaboration, "Alaska", with Karlien van Jaarsveld, entered the Maroela Media Afrikaanse Top-20 chart at number 20, in the wake of his death.

== Discography ==
Studio albums

Title	Album details
Lewe	Released: 2018; Tracks: 18
The Party Starter	Released: 2019; Tracks: 9
Vreemdeling	Released: 2023; Tracks: 10
God Kan	Released: 2024; Tracks: 16
