= 'n Saak van Geloof =

- Film poster
- Directed by: Diony Kempen
- Written by: Jaco Botha, Diony Kempen
- Produced by: Camel Nayanah
- Starring: Robbie Wessels; Lelia Etsebeth; Vanessa Lee; Michael Brunner; Niekie van den Berg; Reana Nel
- Music by: André Kempen
- Production company: Aristocept
- Distributed by: Indigenous Film Distribution
- Release date: 9 September 2011
- Running time: 90 minutes
- Country: South Africa
- Language: Afrikaans

'n Saak van Geloof (lit. 'A matter of faith') is a South African Afrikaans-language drama film directed by Diony Kempen and released on 9 September 2011.

== Main cast ==
- Robbie Wessels
- Lelia Etsebeth
- Sophia Wessels
- Vanessa Lee
- Niekie van den Berg
- Riana Nel
- Michael Brunner
