= Nianell =

- Born: Sonia Aletta Nel; September 25, 1971 (age 54); Omaruru, Namibia
- Genres: Pop, adult contemporary
- Occupations: Singer, songwriter, motivational speaker, author
- Instruments: Vocals, piano, guitar
- Years active: 1990–present
- Label: Nianell Enterprises
- Spouse(s): Andrew Thompson (m. 2000–2014), Kevin Lievaart (m. 28 April 2024)
- Website: Nianell.co.za

Sonia Aletta Nel (born September 25, 1971, in Omaruru, Namibia), better known as Nianell, is a singer, songwriter, pianist, and guitarist.

== Biography ==
After growing up in Windhoek, Namibia, Nianell graduated with a three-year diploma in light music from Pretoria Technikon in South Africa. She studied classical music at Trinity College in London and at the University of South Africa.

She has a four-octave vocal range and her songs have been described as including "elements of folk, pop, R&B, country, classic and even Celtic music." Four of her albums (Who Painted The Moon?, Angel Tongue, Life's Gift, and I Know I'm Lucky) reached platinum status in South Africa. Nianell gained her first international platinum hit with the song "Who Painted the Moon?" The song was covered by another international singer, Hayley Westernra on the album Pure. The album sold more than 2 million copies and Nianell's composition was featured as a single on this album. In April 2011, she released her first album in the United States. She has won two SAMA Awards: Angel Tongue won Best English Contemporary Album, and "We'll Find a Way" won her Best Female Songwriter.

She released a duet album with Dozi and another duet album with afropop group Romanz in May 2011.

== Personal life ==
She and her ex-husband, Andrew Thompson, have triplets, all girls. In 1998, she played netball in the Namibian national team. Nianell's younger sister, Riana Nel, is also an acclaimed singer and songwriter. Both sisters have performed together on several occasions.

== Discography ==
=== Albums ===
- 2002 – Who Painted the Moon
- 2006 – Life's Gift
- 2004 – Angel Tongue
- 2005 – As One (Live DVD, concert at Emperor's Palace)
- 2007 – I Know I'm Lucky
- 2009 – It Takes Two, with Dozi (DVD)
- 2010 – Sand & Water
- 2011 – Who Painted the Moon (U.S. compilation album)
- 2011 – 'N Duisend Drome
- 2012 – You're the One That I Want – Take 2
- 2012 – My Heart
- 2014 – Just Be
- 2017 – My Beautiful Escape
