= Steve Hofmeyr =

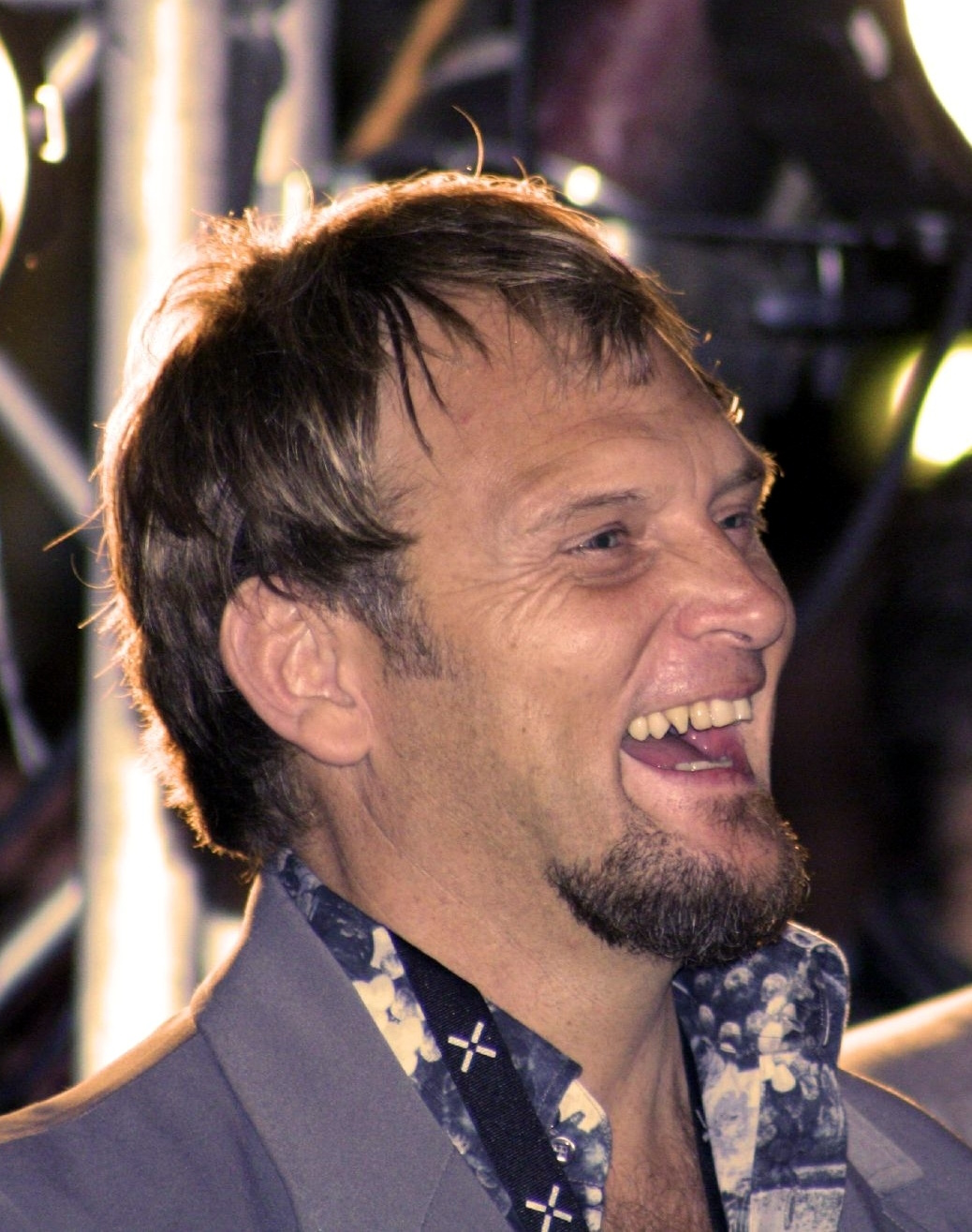
- Steve Hofmeyr in 2007

Background information
- Born: Stephanus Johannes Hofmeyr; 29 August 1964 (age 62); Pretoria, South Africa
- Genres: Afrikaans pop; rock; folk
- Occupations: Musician; songwriter; actor; television presenter
- Instrument: Vocals
- Years active: 1989–present
- Label: Big Heart Productions
- Spouse(s): Natasha Sutherland (m. 1998; div. 2008); Janine van der Vyver (m. 2014)
- Website: stevehofmeyr.co.za

Steve Hofmeyr (born 29 August 1964) is a South African musician, writer and actor known for his prominence in the Afrikaans music scene. Outside of music, he is best known for his long-running role as Doug Durand on Egoli: Place of Gold, as well as his controversial statements and turbulent private life.

== Early life and education ==
Hofmeyr was born on 29 August 1964 in Pretoria, the eldest of five boys to parents Stephanus Johannes Hofmeyr and Catharina Olivier. His grandfather whom he is named after, Steve Hofmeyr Sr., was a leader in the Ossewabrandwag. Receiving his primary school education in Pretoria and Hennenman, he later attended Grey College in Bloemfontein and underwent compulsory military service for two years following graduation. He studied drama at the Technikon Pretoria, but dropped out in 1986 to focus on his acting career.

== Controversies and legal issues ==
=== News Cafe Controversy ===
In January 2007, there were reports that one branch of the News Cafe restaurant chain would not play Hofmeyr's song "Pampoen". The managing director of the company that owns the franchise denies that this is company policy and points out that many Afrikaans acts, such as Karen Zoid and Arno Carstens have performed at News Cafe.

=== Racism ===
On 12 May 2011, Hofmeyr released the lyrics to his new song called "Ons sal dit oorleef", which means "We will survive this". The song is controversial, because Hofmeyr threatened to include the ethnic slur "kaffir" in the lyrics of the song. Hofmeyr removed the offensive word in his song, citing that the word would offend his black friends and colleagues.

In 2011, he made public that he supports the Afrikaner advocacy group "Expedition for Afrikaner Self-Determination" (Onafhanklike Afrikaner Selfbeskikkingsekspedisie, OASE).

Hofmeyr was heavily criticised after performing the former South African national anthem, Die Stem, at the Innibos cultural festival in Nelspruit in July 2014. He went on to perform the anthem on international tours, and encouraged white South Africans to continue singing it, stating that it did not contain any form of hate speech.

In October 2014, Hofmeyr wrote and published a tweet stating that he believed that black South Africans were the "architects of apartheid" on his public Twitter account. This prompted a significant public backlash. One of Hofmeyr's critics was puppeteer Conrad Koch through his puppet Chester Missing, who launched a campaign calling on companies to stop sponsoring Hofmeyr. On 27 November 2014, Hofmeyr failed to acquire a final protection order against Koch and his puppet in the Randburg Magistrate's Court.

Hofmeyr has given statements indicative of apartheid denialism, leading various journalists and political analysts to label him a "disgrace to South Africa".

=== Views on LGBTQ+ issues ===
Hofmeyr criticized Disney's plan to have more inclusive characters, suggesting this was a way of teaching children "bestiality" and that the "+” in LGBTQ+ could be inclusive of relationships with animals. The South African Human Rights Commission has set out demands for Hofmeyr to pay an amount of R500,000 to an NPO who fights for the rights of the LGBTQ+ community, post a formal apology to the LGBTQ+ community, serve 20 hours of community service at an LGBTQ+ center, and attend a workshop on diversity and inclusivity. As of October 2023 there is no evidence of Hofmeyr committing to such obligations.

=== Claims about murders of white South Africans ===
Hofmeyr has made numerous claims relating to murders of white South Africans. Hofmeyr has claimed that whites, and in particular Afrikaners, are being "killed like flies", posting on Facebook that "my tribe is dying". Hofmeyr also posted a picture of a "World Cup soccer stadium" which he claimed could be filled by the number of whites murdered by blacks. Africa Check, a fact-checking organisation has found Hofmeyr's claims to be "incorrect and grossly exaggerated", pointing out that whites are in fact "less likely to be murdered than any other race group". Lizette Lancaster from the Institute for Security Studies told Africa Check that "Whites are far less likely to be murdered than their black or coloured counterparts." While white South Africans account for nearly 9% of the population, they account for 1.8% of murder victims.

=== Removal from MultiChoice networks ===
On 30 April 2019, all content with Hofmeyr was removed from all MultiChoice networks, most notably DStv after Steve's song "Die Land" (The Land) was removed from an award show category by Multichoice's request. In response, Hofmeyr called for a boycott of Multichoice, calling for fans to destroy their DStv boxes. Due to this, fellow Afrikaans singers Bobby van Jaarsveld and Bok van Blerk boycotted a number of televised award shows and concerts in solidarity.

=== Legal issues ===
In December 2008, Hofmeyr poured a cup of cold tea over Huisgenoot magazine editor Esmaré Weideman at the Miss South Africa finals, reportedly due to him blaming her and two other journalists for his recent divorce. Weideman and Hofmeyr subsequently sued each other for assault and invasion of privacy respectively, but both withdrew their claims in 2011.

On 19 December 2013, Hofmeyr was arrested in Bronkhorstspruit for driving 169 km/h in an 80 km/h zone, and was released on bail of R500. He was subsequently fined R10,000 in the Bronkhorstspruit Magistrate's Court on 23 January 2014.

== Personal life ==
Hofmeyr identifies as a Christian.

Hofmeyr married actress Natasha Sutherland, whom he had met on the set of Egoli: Place of Gold in 1998. They have two sons, Benjamin and Sebastian. The couple divorced in 2008 following revelations of his affairs with several women, including with fitness instructor Janine van der Vyver, for the entirety of their marriage. Following a legal dispute between him and van der Vyver, they later reconciled and married on 26 January 2014. Their daughter, Romy Lee, was born 19 June 2017.

Hofmeyr has a total of six children with five different women, and his turbulent private life has drawn frequent media attention.

== Discography ==
- Desertbound (1989)
- Only Me (1990)
- Steve (1991)
- No Hero (1992)
- Tribute (1993)
- Tribute Volume 2 (1994)
- The Hits/Die Treffers (1994)
- Decade (1995)
- Close to You - single (1997)
- True to You (1997)
- Die Bloubul - single (1997)
- Southern Cross (1999)
- Die Bok Kom Weer (1999)
- Beautiful Noise (2000)
- Grootste Treffers Volume 2 (2000)
- Engele Om Ons (2001)
- Toeka (2003)
- Toeka 2 (2004)
- Grootste Platinum Treffers (2005)
- Laaities & Ladies (2006)
- Waarmaker (2007)
- Go Bulle Go - EP (2008)
- Sings Kris Kristofferson (2008)
- Solitary Man – Songs of Neil Diamond (2009)
- Duisend en Een (2010)
- Haloda (2011) (SA No. 16)
- 25 Jaar se Bestes (2012)
- Toeka 3 (2014) (SA No. 1)
- If you could read my mind (2015) (SA No. 2)
- Skree (2017) (SA No. 1)
- The Country Collection (2018) (SA No. 1)
- The Country Collection Vol. 3 (2019)
- Mamba (2024)
- Dwaas (2025)

== Filmography ==
=== Stage ===
- Summer Holiday
- Joseph and the Amazing Technicolor Dreamcoat
- Die Soen
- 'n Plek Binne Jou Seun
- Sound of Music
- Dis Hoe Dit Was – Die Steve Hofmeyr Storie
- Lied van my Hart
- Boeta se Vel Fluit

=== Film ===
- Kampus (1986)
- Agter Elke Man (1990)
- No Hero (1992)
- Die Gevaar Van De AAR (1993)
- A Case of Murder (2004)
- Bakgat 2 (2010)
- Platteland (2011)
- Pretville (2012)
- Treurgrond (2015)

=== Television ===
- Guillam Woudberg (1985)
- Agter Elke Man (1986–1988)
- Egoli (1992–2001)
- Sporting Chance (1995)
- 7de Laan (2007–2012)
- Comedy Central Roast of Steve Hofmeyr (2012)
- Dis Hoe Dit Is met Steve (2006 -)
- Die Kwesbares (2020)
