= Romanz =

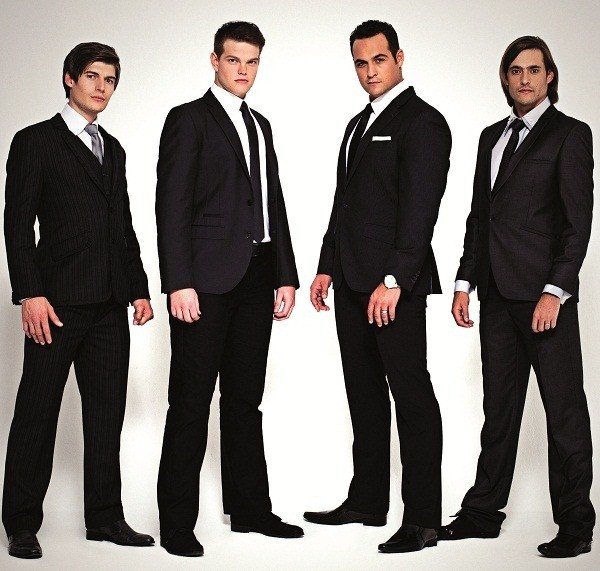
- From left Burgend Botha, Christopher Lee Viljoen, André Venter, Adam Barnard

Background information
- Origin: South Africa
- Genres: Pop; adult contemporary
- Instrument: Vocals
- Years active: 2008–2014
- Label: Select Music
- Website: romanz.co.uk

Romanz was a South African pop/opera vocal quartet. They sang predominantly in Afrikaans and also in English. They won several prominent awards for their work. They disbanded in 2014. Adam Barnard died on 6 May 2022.

== Members ==
- André Venter (2008–2014)
- Burgerd Botha (2008–2014)
- Adam Barnard (2008–2014)
- Christopher Lee Viljoen (2012–2014)
- Louis Loock (2008–2012)

== Discography ==
=== Studio albums ===
- My Hele Hart (2009)
- Bly Getrou (2009)
- Ek Sal Getuig (2010)
- 'N Duisend Drome (2011)
- Hou Vas (2012)
- With All My Heart (2012)
- Lig Jou Stem Op (2013)

=== Live albums ===
- 2010: Treffers Live (CD)
- 2011: Ek Sal Getuig 'Live' CD

=== DVDs ===
- 2010: Treffers Live (DVD)
- 2011: Ek Sal Getuig 'Live' DVD

== Charts ==
=== Weekly charts ===
My Hele Hart
Chart (2009)	Peak position
South African Albums (RISA)	17

'N Duisend Drome
Chart (2011)	Peak position
South African Albums Chart	4

Lig Jou Stem Op
Chart (2013)	Peak position
South African Albums (RISA)	20
