= Karen Zoid =

South African musician (born 1978)

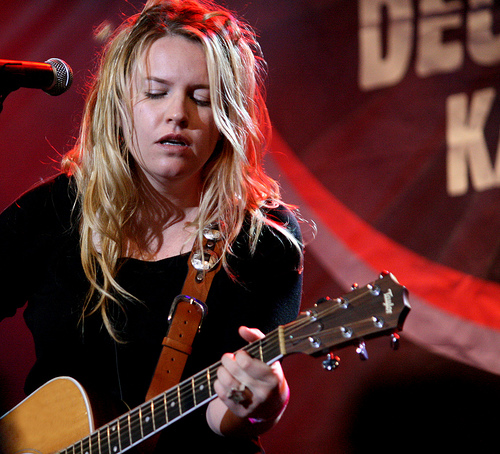
- Zoid at a concert in 2009

Background information
- Born: Karen Louise Greeff; August 10, 1978 (age 48); Brussels, Belgium
- Genres: Rock; pop; classical; adult contemporary
- Occupations: Singer; songwriter; guitarist; composer; talk show host
- Instruments: Vocals; guitar; flute; bagpipes
- Years active: 2001–present
- Website: www.karenzoid.co.za

Karen Zoid (born Karen Louise Greeff on 10 August 1978) is a South African rock singer, songwriter, guitarist, composer and talk show host. Her work in both English and Afrikaans has gathered critical acclaim, and she has been dubbed South Africa's "Queen of Rock" by several major local publications. Her followers and, more generally, the South African youth have also been referred to as the "Zoid Generation" by the press. Zoid's current band members are Jeandré Schultz (guitar), Werner Ainslie (bass guitar), Anton Eloff (keys) and Giovanni Serci (drums). The singer is also known for hosting the kykNet television series Republiek van Zoid Afrika and was one of the judges on The Voice SA as well.

== Early life ==
Born in Brussels to a South African diplomat, Zoid grew up in Belgium before moving to Johannesburg. Here she attended the National School of the Arts before going on to study drama at AFDA. In 2001, she dropped out of university to focus her attention on music.

== Career ==
Zoid's first album, Poles Apart, was released by EMI in June 2001. "Afrikaners is Plesierig", a song featured on the album, has achieved iconic status in South Africa, entering the local lexicon and being listed as one of the 100 greatest South African songs by the Sunday Times. EMI released her second album, Chasing the Sun, in June 2003 and her third, Media, in July 2005. Her fourth album, Postmodern World, was released in August 2007 after she had left EMI and signed with Just Music earlier that year. In 2009, Sony released Ultimate Zoid, a two disk album combining hits from her previous albums with three new tracks, and a live recording. Terms and Conditions was also released by Sony in 2010. Zoid Afrika was released in 2012, by Zoid's own production company, Karen Zoid Productions.

Music from Zoid's albums has been included on the audio entertainment of international flights to and from South Africa. She has also written music for television, with two of her songs featuring in the 2006 movie "Number 10". On 3 May 2008, she won the SAMA for Best Female Solo Artist. Karen Zoid performed at the inaugurations of Presidents Thabo Mbeki in 2004 and Jacob Zuma in 2009. She and her band also performed at the Nelson Mandela 46664 HIV/AIDS benefit concert in 2005, and at the centenary celebrations of the ANC in 2012. She and her band have had several concerts in London, mainly to South African audiences. In 2006 they performed in London, Canada and Dubai (at the Dubai Desert Rhythm Festival).

In 2010, Karen Zoid starred in a Franz Marx film, Susanna van Biljon. She also recorded the film's theme song. Republiek van Zoid Afrika, a late-night talk show hosted by Zoid, premiered on kykNET in July 2014. As of early 2016, Zoid is a judge on the local version of the singing competition The Voice.

== Personal life ==
In 2004, Zoid married former band member Don Reineke, with whom she had a son, Ben Francis Reinecke, on January 29 2007. The couple later divorced in 2010.

== Albums ==
- Poles Apart (2001)
- Chasing The Sun (2003)
- In Die Staatsteater DVD (2003)
- Media (2005)
- Postmodern World (2007)
- Alive in a Postmodern World DVD (2008)
- Ultimate Zoid (2009)
- Terms & Conditions (2010)
- Zoid Afrika (2012)
- Drown Out The Noise (2015)
- Op Die Oomblik Deel 1 (2017)
- Op Die Oomblik Deel 2 (2019)
- Under The Covers - Live (2021)
- Humanoid (2023)
