= Bok van Blerk =

Afrikaans singer

- Born: Louis Andreas Pepler; 30 March 1978 (age 48); Pretoria, South Africa
- Origin: Pretoria, South Africa
- Genre: Pop rock
- Years active: 2005–present
- Labels: Mozi Records; Coleske Artists
- Website: www.bokvanblerk.co.za

Bok van Blerk (born Louis Andreas Pepler; 30 March 1978) is a South African singer-songwriter who sings in Afrikaans. He became famous in 2006 for his rendition of "De la Rey" by Sean Else and Johan Vorster.

Though controversy attended the release of "De la Rey", South Africa's Department of Arts and Culture examined the debate and then wished van Blerk well with the song, writing officially that the department saw "no problem".

== Early life and career ==
Van Blerk went to school at Hoërskool die Wilgers in Pretoria. After his study, he spent time working abroad.

In March 2006, Bok van Blerk and the Mossies released the album Jy praat nog steeds my taal (You still speak my language). The same album was rereleased in October 2006 under the name De La Rey and solely credited to Bok van Blerk. According to Van Blerk "and the Mossies" was removed because his fellow singer, Tanya van Graan, was too busy modeling. Van Blerk is accompanied by Jaco Mans (and occasionally Manie van Niekerk) on lead guitar, Francois Coetzee on bass guitar, and Nathan Smit on the drums.

== "De la Rey" controversy ==
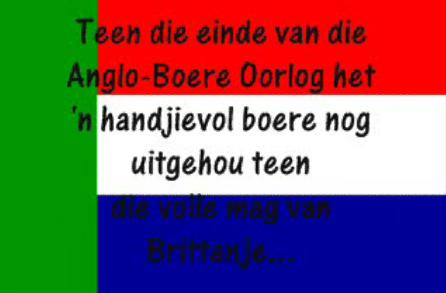
Transvaal vierkleur flag with pro-Boer text that accompanies music video intro

On 6 February 2007, the South African Department of Arts and Culture issued a statement regarding "De la Rey" (ostensibly a tribute to 19th-century military leader Koos de la Rey) and its then popularity with some Afrikaners, some of whom were claimed to interpret the song as a call to armed conflict. (See "Bring Me My Machine Gun" for additional historical context.) At some of van Blerk's concerts, audience members were seen flying the Apartheid-era South African flag and the Transvaal flag, the Vierkleur, also associated with the Apartheid era. The Orange Free State flag (a historical Afrikaner state) is shown in a period scene in the music video. Huisgenoot, a widely read woman's magazine, asked Minister of Arts and Culture Pallo Jordan to comment. In its statement, the department lamented that the song could be hijacked by right-wingers, but wished the singer good luck. The department also stated that it had no problem with protests or mobilisation from the opposition, as long as they occur within the framework of democratic law.

Van Blerk says that he himself does not identify with the old South African flag, nor does he want to be associated with the old South Africa. He is, however, proudly Afrikaans, and has refused to participate in concerts organised by 94.7 Highveld Stereo, a radio station that declines to play Afrikaans music.

Van Blerk is also clear that he does not align with the Boeremag: he does not believe violence to be a solution, and believes that General de la Rey was pro-peace. Famed Afrikaans musician Koos Kombuis points out that van Blerk's rugby song "Habana!" is about a heroic Coloured athlete, Bryan Habana, thus differentiating van Blerk himself from the subjects of his music. Van Blerk printed a disclaimer on the sleeve of his second album, Afrikanerhart: "Afrikanerhart does not call for any kind of revolution or uprising. It comes from the musical 'Ons vir Jou', and we simply wish to say that Afrikaners also shed blood while building South Africa. If we respect all our cultures and history, we together will make this country stronger". (Translated from the original Afrikaans)

== Discography ==
Title and details	Notes	Peak chart positions	Certifications
Title and details	Notes	SA	Certifications
De La Rey: Type: Album; Production: Mozi Records; Distribution: Select Music; Released: 2005	No. / Title / Length; 1. / "De la Rey"; 2. / "Praat nog steeds my taal"; 3. / "Vodka en OJ"; 4. / "Hatfield Jol"; 5. / "Die Bok kan blêr"; 6. / "Lenteblomme"; 7. / "So waai die wind"; 8. / "Stuk van jou"; 9. / "Op Walvisbaai"; 10. / "'68 Chevy"; 11. / "Katie"; 12. / "Girls in bikinis"; 13. / "Habana!"	3	SA: Platinum
Afrikanerhart: Type: Album; Distribution: Select Music; Released: 2009	No. / Title / Length; 1. / "Tyd Om Te Trek"; 2. / "Afrikanerhart"; 3. / "Super Schalk"; 4. / "Brandewyn Het Nie Brieke Nie"; 5. / "Jou Pa Is Hier"; 6. / "Klaar Met My"; 7. / "Die Kaplyn"; 8. / "My Angel"; 9. / "Die Kleur Van My Vel"; 10. / "Seilvisskoffel"; 11. / "Boeregirl"; 12. / "Miss U.S.A"; 13. / "Nooit Weer Gesien Nie"; 14. / "Sink of Swem"; 15. / "Pa en Seun"	1	
My Kreet: Type: Album; Distribution: Select Music; Released: 2010	No. / Title / Length; 1. / "My Kreet"; 2. / "Die ou klipkerk gebou"; 3. / "'n Goeie man"; 4. / "BMX en bende"; 5. / "Tannie Tina van Wyk"; 6. / "Konyne"; 7. / "Anderkant die treinspoor"; 8. / "Bloubul shebeen"; 9. / "Die bokke skiet terug"; 10. / "Diknek en klein tandjies"; 11. / "Honnelos"; 12. / "Platteland"	-	
Steek Die Vure Aan: Type: Album; Distribution: Select Music; Released: 2013	No. / Title / Length; 1. / "Land Van Melk En Heuning"; 2. / "Koue Voete En Warm Liefde"; 3. / "Die Groot Trek Weer Kaap Toe"; 4. / "Steek Die Vure Aan"; 5. / "Ons Kyk Na Ons Mense"; 6. / "'Van Hings'"; 7. / "Daai Klein-Dorpie Gevoel"; 8. / "Tref En Trap"; 9. / "Gebore Om Vry Te Wees"; 10. / "Ek En My Vlerk"; 11. / "Vroumens"; 12. / "Huil Soos 'n Man"; 13. / "Bakbeen Anties"; 14. / "Bloubul Snor"	7	
Sing Afrikaner Sing: Type: Album; Distribution: Select Music; Released: 2015	No. / Title / Length; 1. / "Sing Afrikaner Sing"; 2. / "Bosveld Afrika"; 3. / "Hou Jou Voete Op Die Grond"; 4. / "Aan Jou Lippe"; 5. / "Spooloos"; 6. / "Al Die Dubbles"; 7. / "Bok Vir Sports"; 8. / "Die Beste Dag Van My Lewe"; 9. / "Soos In Die Ou Dae"; 10. / "Voor Ek My Kop Neerlê"; 11. / "Skoenmaker"; 12. / "Ek Het - Duet Met Laurika Rauch"; 13. / "Soutwater"	4	
Van De La Rey Tot Nou: Type: Album; Distribution: Select Music; Released: 2016		15	
Hoor Ons!: Type: Album; Distribution: Select Music; Released: 2019		1	

== Filmography ==
- Platteland (2011)
- As jy sing (2013)
- Vrou Soek Boer (2014)
- Leading Lady (2014)
- Blood & Glory (Modder en Bloed, 2018)
