= Lira (singer) =

South African singer (born 1979)

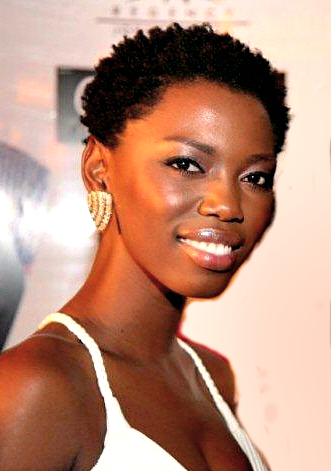
- Born: Lerato Moipone Molapo; 14 March 1979 (age 47); Daveyton, Gauteng, South Africa
- Spouse: Robin Kohl (m. 2009; sep. 2019)
- Musical career
- Origin: Johannesburg, Gauteng, South Africa
- Genres: R&B; Afro-soul; funk; jazz
- Occupations: Singer; songwriter; actress; television personality; model
- Instruments: Vocals; keyboard
- Years active: 2003–present
- Labels: Sony; Oratel Music
- Website: Official website

Lerato Moipone Molapo (born 14 March 1979), known professionally as Lira, is a South African singer. Her name translates to "love" in Sesotho and she speaks four languages. She is a multi-platinum selling and an 11-time South African Music Award (SAMA)-winning Afro-soul vocalist, who refers to her music as "a fusion of soul, funk, elements of jazz and African."

According to The Star newspaper, Lira is currently considered the foremost adult contemporary female solo artist in South Africa. She has appeared in major ad campaigns and been an ambassador for Audi, Shield, Samsung, MTN and BlackBerry. She has appeared on the covers of more than 30 magazines worldwide.

She lends her time and resources to causes that matter to her the most. She remains active with and has received awards from various grassroots organisations, outreach groups, and advocacy programs such as the Student Sponsorship Programme – which presented her with the Inspiration Award in 2011.

She has also participated in numerous activities for The Southern Africa Trust. In 2015, she was listed by Forbes Magazine as one of the richest female singers in Africa with net worth in excess of $35 million. She was a member of the coaching panel of The Voice South Africa from 2016 to 2019.

== Life and career ==
=== 1979–1994: Early childhood ===
Lerato Moipone Molapo was born on 14 March 1979 in Daveyton, Johannesburg to Buyi Radebe (mother) and Khanyapa Molapo Sr. (father).

Lira's world was shaped by the harsh realities of South Africa's formerly racial and socioeconomic apartheid. She grew up listening to Miriam Makeba, Stevie Wonder, Aretha Franklin and Nina Simone, who would eventually inspire her own songwriting. She began performing live at the age of 16, singing both cover versions and self-penned songs.

As an undergraduate student, Lira studied Accounting and used her skills to exchange for recording time at a local studio, resulting in her first demo at the age of 18. Upon graduation, Lira continued in accounting for two years. With ambitions to be a singer she turned in her letter of resignation and created a five-year plan for her music career.

=== 1995–2005: Music career beginnings ===
In 2000, she was discovered by musician/producer Arthur Mafokate, who signed her to his record label, 999 Music, and helped with the release of her debut album, All My Love (2003). The album earned her accolades at the Metro FM Awards, SAMAs and Channel O Reel Music Awards. The title track even knocked Beyoncé's single "Dangerously in Love" off the charts The following year, she left 999 Music and teamed up with keyboardist Victor Mngomezulu, bassist Tshepo Sekele, and producer Robin Kohl. Subsequently, she was signed to Sony Music Africa and released her first major label album Feel Good the following year.

=== 2006: Feel Good ===
In 2006, she released her first major label album on Sony Music Africa. Feel Good began making waves on the South African music scene. The title track quickly became the most played local song at radio. The album earned her nominations at the South African Music Awards (SAMA) and became the first music video from a South African artist to be featured on VH-1. The album sold Triple-Platinum by the Recording Industry of South Africa while the single received the SAMA Award in 2008 for most downloaded song. In July 2007, the album was released in Italy, where its title track gained massive airplay.

=== 2008: Soul in Mind ===
In 2008, she released the 13-track LP Soul in Mind. It went on to set a SAMA record the following summer for most awards won in a single year (4) by a single artist. The album was certified triple-platinum. Later that year Glamour Magazine South Africa named her "Woman of the Year."

=== 2009: Live in Concert: A Celebration ===
In 2009, she began assembling the makings of her live concert DVD. Filmed before a live audience at the Carnival City Casino, the production employed 10 RED digital video cameras – a first globally – and was released the same year. Nine million South Africans tuned into the concert's telecast and subsequently, the DVD reached three-times platinum when it was released in November 2010. In 2011, a Blu-ray version was released making it the first Blu-ray to be released on the continent. The DVD won the Award for "Best Global Chart DVD" at the 2010 SAMA's. It soon became the country's fastest and highest selling music video disc in the Sony Music catalogue, replacing Celine Dion's No. 1 chart position for Live in Las Vegas; A New Day. The soundtrack to the DVD released in October 2009 was certified Platinum

=== 2010: FIFA World Cup Kick-Off Concert ===
In the summer of 2010, she joined a lineup of artists that included Alicia Keys, Shakira, K'Naan and John Legend, at the FIFA World Cup Kick-Off Concert performing a rendition of "Pata Pata," a hit song originally recorded by the late Miriam Makeba. Later that summer, she was selected to take part in the 92nd birthday celebration of former South African president Nelson Mandela. Telecast live in 3D directly to Mandela, her performance of the popular Labi Siffre anti-apartheid tune and Mandela's favourite "(Something Inside) So Strong" with the Soweto Spiritual Singers proved to be one of the most prominent performances in her career.

She made her cinematic debut as the support lead in the Antonio Falduto-directed drama The Italian Consul (Il Console Italiano). In June 2011, the film premiered at the Taormina Film Festival in Italy, where Lira became only the second African vocalist to grace the Teatro Del Greco stage since Miriam Makeba. Lira stars opposite Italian actress Giuliana de Sio – as well as Edwin Angless and Anna Galiena, while the film centres on the trafficking of girls in Europe.

=== 2011: Return to Love and recognition ===
In January 2011, she unveiled her fourth studio album Return to Love. The 11-track set contained songs about hope, love and interconnectedness. Songs included "Call Me," "Abba", "Get into Action", "Mali", "Phakade," and "Be My Friend", while incorporating sounds of funk, ragga, urban, soul and traditional African. The album did well as it went double-platinum and the hit song Phakade reached triple-platinum. The album was followed by the concert called CAPTURED IN TOUR where she toured around five cities in South Africa. The concert was recorded and later released in DVD format, which sold gold.

In December 2011, she was named one of the "Five Unique Artists to Change Music in 2012" by Essence magazine.

In May 2012, she appeared in L'Uomo Vogue's "Re-Branding Africa" issue, featuring General Ban Ki-Moon on the cover, where she said, "We're a young democracy, and we're accustomed to an image of Africa as a place that expects outside help. We must instead take stock of our situation, become autonomous, find our identity and independence."

=== 2014: Rise Again ===
On 29 April 2014, she released her debut American album, Rise Again (Shanachie Records), a 14-track LP featuring songs from her African catalogue, including "Feel Good", "Phakade" and "Rise Again."

=== 2014: Jill Scott Concert, Johannesburg ===
On 13 December 2014, Lira was the special guest act for American Neo-Soul star Jill Scott, in a one-night-only concert in Johannesburg.

=== 2016: Born Free ===
On 25 March 2016, she released her sixth studio album, Born Free, featuring songs such as "Rhythm of Your Heart", "Listen", Brave Heart", "Let There Be Light" and "Be About It" exclusive for iTunes Africa. In August 2016, the artist announced that the album reached gold status together with the single "Sekunjalo" and the single "Let There Be Light" went platinum. Lira didn't submit the album for nominations at Metro FM and SAMA Awards, hence the album had no awards.

Following her recovery from a stroke, South African singer Lira collaborated with Chase Bell on new music entitled DO ME, with their joint project achieving commercial success including a sold-out event on April 18, 2026 at Lyric Theatre Johannesburg. A Historic Milestone since Nelson Mandela as tickets for the landmark collaboration concert.

== Personal life ==
On 9 September 2009, she married music manager Robin Kohl. In July 2019, she announced their separation after 9 years of marriage.

In April 2022, Lira's management team announced that she had suffered a stroke during a trip to Germany. As a result, her ability to speak was impacted. She underwent medical treatment in South Africa and took a break from recording and live performances.

On 1 September 2022, Lira made her first public appearance since her stroke, attending the launch of fellow musician, Tamara Dey's, new single, Disco Therapy. She has since revealed that she has been suffering from Aphasia as a result of her stroke.

== Discography ==
=== Studio albums ===
- All My Love (999 Music, 2003)
- Feel Good (Sony/BMG Africa, 2006)
- Soul in Mind (Sony/BMG Africa, 2008)
- Lira Live in Concert: A Celebration (Sony/BMG Africa, 2009)
- Return to Love (Sony/BMG Africa, 2011)
- CAPTURED IN TOUR (Oratel Music, 2011)
- The LIRA EP (2011)
- LIRA: The First Decade (Oratel Music, 2014)
- Rise Again (Shanachie Records, 2014)
- Born Free (Otarel Music, 2016)

=== Singles ===
- "All My Love" (2003)
- "Good Lovin'" (2003)
- "Feel Good" (2006)
- "Ixesha" (2007)
- "Wa Mpaleha" (2008)
- "Rise Again" (2009)
- "Phakade" (2010)
- "Get into Action" (2010)
- "Mali" (2012)
- "Be My Friend" (2012)
- "Eduze Kwami" (2013)
- "Listen" (2015)
- "Rhythms of your Heart" (2015)
- "Let There Be Light" (2016)
- "Be About It" (2016)
- "Sekunjalo" (2016)
- “Do Me” (with Chase Bell)(2026)

== Achievements ==
Year	Award/Ceremony	Category	Results	Ref.
2004	Metro FM Awards	Best R&B Album	Nominated	
2004	Metro FM Awards	Best Vocalist	Nominated	
2004	Metro FM Awards	Best Newcomer	Nominated	
2004	10th Annual South African Music Awards	Best R&B Album (All My Love)	Nominated	
2004	Channel O Reel Music Award		Won	
2006	12th Annual South African Music Awards	Best New Artist	Nominated	
2006	12th Annual South African Music Awards	Best Female Artist	Nominated	
2006	12th Annual South African Music Awards	Best R&B Album	Nominated	
2006	12th Annual South African Music Awards	Best Video	Nominated	
2006	12th Annual South African Music Awards	Best Single (Feel Good)	Nominated	
2007	13th Annual South African Music Awards	Best Music Video (Feel Good)	Won	
2008	14th Annual South African Music Awards	Best Selling Download (Feel Good)	Won	
2008	14th Annual South African Music Awards	Best Music Video (Ixesha)	Won	
2009	15th Annual South African Music Awards	Best Female Artist	Won	
2009	15th Annual South African Music Awards	Best Adult Contemporary Album	Won	
2009	15th Annual South African Music Awards	Best Album of the Year (Soul in Mind)	Won	
2009	15th Annual South African Music Awards	Best Remix of the Year (Feel Good)	Won	
2009	MTV Africa Music Awards	Best Female Artist	Nominated	
2009	MTV Africa Music Awards	Best Artist of the Year	Nominated	
2009	MOBO Awards	Best African Act	Nominated	
2009	Channel O Reel Music Awards	Best Female Artist	Nominated	
2010	16th Annual South African Music Awards	Best Female Artist	Won	
2010	16th Annual South African Music Awards	Best Global Chart DVD (Live in Concert: A Celebration)	Won	
2010	16th Annual South African Music Awards	Best Album Packaging	Nominated	
2010	Feather Awards		Won	
2011	Channel O Music Video Awards	Most Gifted Female Video	Won	
2011	Channel O Music Video Awards	Most Gifted Video of Year	Nominated	
2012	18th Annual South African Music Awards	Best Smooth Urban	Nominated	
2012	18th Annual South African Music Awards	Best Producer	Nominated	
2012	18th Annual South African Music Awards	Best Engineer	Nominated	
2012	18th Annual South African Music Awards	Remix of the Year	Nominated	
2012	18th Annual South African Music Awards	Record of the Year	Nominated	
2012	BET Awards	Best International Artist	Nominated	
2013	South African Music Awards	Best Live DVD	Won	
2014	Africa Muzik Magazine Awards	Best Female Southern Africa	Pending	
