= Bobby van Jaarsveld =

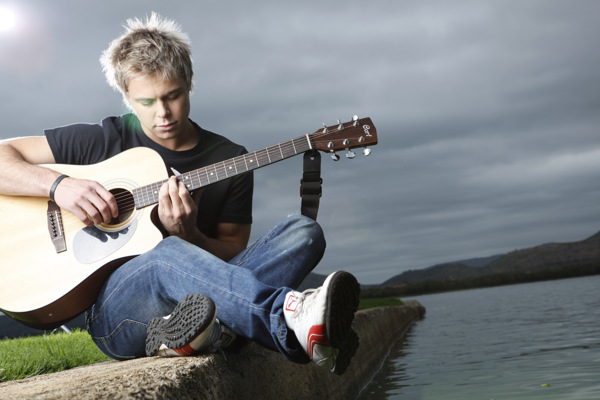

Background information
- Born: Pieter van Jaarsveld; 6 March 1987 (age 39); Paarl, South Africa
- Genres: Pop; pop rock
- Occupations: Singer; songwriter; actor; model
- Years active: 2001–present
- Label: Coleske Artists
- Website: bobbyvanjaarsveld.com

Pieter van Jaarsveld, professionally known as Bobby van Jaarsveld, (born 6 March 1987) is a South African Afrikaans-language pop singer-songwriter and actor. He released his debut studio album, Duisend Ure in 2006.

His second studio album, Net Vir Jou (2009) enjoyed greater commercial success and yielded the singles "Net Vir Jou" and "Spieëltjie". In 2012, he released his third studio album, Wat Geld Nie Kan Koop Nie. His fourth studio album, Maak 'n Wens (2014), reached no. 4 on the South African Albums Chart, marking his highest chart position to date.

As an actor he has starred in a number of films such as Liefling – Die Movie (2010), As Jy Sing (2013), Free State (2016) and Eksie Perfeksie (2024). He has also appeared in a number of television projects such as Spoorloos (2022) and Ek, Hy en Jy (2025-26). In 2025, he starred in the stage musical adaptation of the romantic comedy, Semi-Soet (2012).

He was also a judge on The Voice South Africa for two seasons (2016-17).

== Early life ==
Van Jaarsveld, who was nicknamed "Bobby" after his father, was born on 6 March 1987 in Paarl, Western Cape. He is the second of three children and has two sisters, one of whom is also a singer (Karlien van Jaarsveld). As a child, he attended several primary schools before matriculating from Brits High School.

== Career ==
=== Music ===
Van Jaarsveld started his professional singing career in high school when he was offered singing record, and he released his first solo album in his last year. He won the award for Best Newcomer at the Huisgenoot Tempo Awards in 2006 after receiving three nominations from the Klein Karoo Nasionale Kunstefees, Vonk (a local music magazine) and Huisgenoot Tempo magazine. As the winner of this category, Van Jaarsveld performed at the Skouspel Extravaganza hosted at Sun City, and continued to do until 2011.

In November 2006, Theuns Jordaan Productions offered Van Jaarsveld a recording contract. His first album, 'n Duisend Ure, was released later that year and album sales reached gold status. His second album, Net Vir Jou, was released in 2009 by Coleske Artists. Van Jaarsveld wrote and composed each of the tracks on the album. Album sales reached platinum status within eight weeks, and have since reached double platinum status with sales of 83,000 units. Songs from the album include Spieëltjie and Net Vir Jou.

In January 2010, Van Jaarsveld was awarded the Viewers' Favourite Artist award for 2001 on DKNT, a local music program on DStv. That same year, "Spieëltjie", a song from his second album, won Best Afrikaans Song at both the Huisgenot Tempo and Vonk Awards. He went on to release two more albums, "Wat Geld Nie Kan Koop Nie" and "Maak 'n Wens" in 2012 and 2014, respectively.

In February 2016, his single "Middernag Serenade" peaked at number 2 on the Maroela Media Afrikaanse Top-20 chart of the top-selling Afrikaans singles in South Africa. In the same year, his single "HOLY" topped the South African iTunes chart. In 2018, he released a new single, "Die Land", with Steve Hofmeyr, Bok van Blerk, Jay, and Rohan du Toit. The song peaked at number 2 on the Maroela Media Afrikaanse Top-20 chart. In December 2019, his single "Ek weet al kanal", a duet with Demi Lee Moore, topped the Maroela Media Afrikaanse Top-20 chart. In October 2020, his single "Sprokie", a duet with Early B, peaked at number 11 on the Maroela Media Afrikaanse Top-20 chart. In August 2023, his single "Toe, nou en altyd", also peaked at number 11 on the Maroela Media Afrikaanse Top-20 chart.

In March 2024, he released the single "Verlore seun", which peaked at number 7 on the Maroela Media Afrikaanse Top-20 chart. In August of the same year, he released the single "Lief My Weer Lewendig". The song peaked at number 14 on the Maroela Media Afrikaanse Top-20 chart. In August, he also performed the national anthem of South Africa in Perth in Australia before kickoff of the test match between the Australia national rugby union team and South Africa national rugby union team.

In December 2024, he released a new single, "Niks Soos Liefde Nie" (Nothing Like Love), which reflects on the end of his marriage. The song debuted at number 18 on the Maroela Media Afrikaanse Top-20 chart.

In April 2025, his single "Wat Dit Ook Al Vat" peaked at number 6 on the Maroela Media Afrikaanse Top-20 chart. Later that month, he had a second hit on the chart, with "Shut up en soen my", a duet with Irene-Louise Van Wyk, peaking at number 2. In August of the same year, he topped the chart with "Boer Ding".

In March 2026, his single "Regte Plekke" peaked at number 3 on the Maroela Media Afrikaans Top-20 chart.

=== Film and television ===
Van Jaarsveld played the lead character in the Afrikaans film Liefling – Die Movie, which was released in November 2010 by Hartiwood Studios South Africa and fetched R16 million at the local box office. He also starred in the film As Jy Sing in 2013.

In 2022, he was cast in the fourth season of the South African crime drama anthology television series Spoorloos.

In 2024, he starred in Eksie Perfeksie, an Afrikaans comedy on Showmax.

=== Reality TV ===
In 2016, Van Jaarsveld began appearing as a judge on the local singing competition The Voice SA.

Between 2017 and 2019, he and his sister were the subjects of the Showmax reality series Bobby & Karlien: In Jou Skoene. In each episode, the siblings spend 48 hours with people that have fallen on hard times or face other immense challenges in their lives.

In 2024, he participated in the new season of Tropika Island of Treasure in Zanzibar, which his sister, Karlien, won the previous year. In the same year, he appeared as a contestant on SABC's local version of Masked Singer. He used the alter-ego "Mielie" for his performances.

== Accolades ==
Bobby has received numerous awards and nominations (Award names kept in original language).

Year	Organization	Award
2006	Huisgenoot Tempo Toekennings	Beste Nuweling
2010	KykNet DKNT	Gunsteling Kunstenaar vir 2009
2010	SAMA Toekennings	Beste Afrikaanse Kontemporêre Album: Net Vir Jou
2010	Huisgenoot Tempo Toekennings	Beste Afrikaanse Liedjie: Spieëltjie
2010	Huisgenoot Tempo Toekennings	Beste Afrikaanse Kontemporêre Album: Net Vir Jou
2010	Vonk Toekennings	Beste Manlike Kunstenaar
2010	Vonk Toekennings	Beste Afrikaanse Kontemporêre Album: Net vir jou
2010	Vonk Toekennings	Beste Oorspronklike Liedjieskrywer
2010	Vonk Toekennings	Beste Afrikaanse Liedjie: Spieëltjie
2011	MK Toekennings	Beste Solo Album: Net Vir Jou
2011	MK Toekennings	Beste Kontemporêre Liedjie: Spieëltjie
2011	Huisgenoot Tempo Toekennings	Mees Gewilde Manlike Kunstenaar
2011	Jacaranda 94.2 Toekennings	Mees Gewilde Manlike Kunstenaar
2012	Ghoema-toekennings	Liedjie van die Jaar: Kan Ek Met Jou Praat
2012	90.6 FM Stereo Toekennings	Top 15 Kunstenaar
2012	Huisgenoot Tempo Toekennings	Mees Gewilde Manlike Kunstenaar
2013	Ghoema-toekennings	Beste Musiekvideo: 'n Vrou Wil Dit Hoor
2013	Ghoema-toekennings	Beste Manlike Kontemporêre Album: Wat Geld Nie Kan Koop Nie
2013	Ghoema-toekennings	Manlike Kunstenaar van die Jaar
2013	Ghoema-toekennings	Liedjie van die Jaar: 'n Vrou Wil Dit Hoor
2013	Huisgenoot Tempo Toekennings	Album van die Jaar - Wat Geld Nie Kan Koop Nie
2013	Huisgenoot Tempo Toekennings	Musiekvideo van die Jaar - 'n Vrou Wil Dit Hoor
2013	Huisgenoot Tempo Toekennings	Liedjie van die Jaar - 'n Vrou Wil Dit Hoor
2014	Ghoema-toekennings	Beste Musiekvideo - EENS IN ‘N LEEFTYD met Riana Nel
2014	Huisgenoot Tempo Toekennings	Liedjie van die Jaar
2015	Ghoema-toekennings	Beste Pop-Album deur 'n Manlike Kunstenaar - Maak 'n Wens
2015	Ghoema-toekennings	Manlike Kunstenaar van die Jaar
2015	Ghoema-toekennings	Album van die Jaar - Maak 'n Wens

== Personal life ==
Van Jaarsveld is a professed Christian. He and his wife Annatjie van Jaarsveld, whom he married in January 2011, have two sons, Sion and Leben and a daughter named Armani In 2018 van Jaarsveld and his family decide to leave their home in Pretoria and relocated to Ballito. On 24 November 2024, van Jaarsveld revealed that he and his wife were getting divorced.

In 2016, he was named by Cosmopolitan (South Africa) as "the sexiest man in South Africa". In 2017, the Afrikaans women's magazine, Sarie named him as "South Africa's most beautiful man".

== Discography ==
=== Studio albums ===
List of albums, with selected chart positions
Title	Details	Peak positions	Ref
Title	Details	SA	Ref
Duisend Ure	Release date: 2006; Formats: CD, digital download	—	
Net Vir Jou	Release date: 2009; Formats: CD, digital download	7	
Wat Geld Nie Kan Koop Nie	Release date: 2012; Formats: CD, digital download	7	
Maak 'n Wens	Release date: 2014; Formats: CD, digital download	4	
Die Eerste 10 jaar	Release date: 2015; Formats: CD, digital download	15	
"—" denotes releases that did not chart.

=== Singles ===
- 2009: "Spieëltjie"
- 2010: "Net vir jou"
- 2011: "Kyk Waar is ons Nou"
- 2013: "'n Vrou wil dit hoor"
- 2014: "My Alles"
- 2015: "Een vir Een"
- 2016: ""Middernag Serenade"
- 2017: "HOLY"
- 2018: "Die Land" (with Steve Hofmeyr, Bok van Blerk, Jay, and Rohan du Toit)
- 2019: "Ek weet al kanal" (with Demi Lee Moore)
- 2020: "Sprokie (featuring Early B)"
- 2023: "Toe, nou en altyd"
- 2024: "Verlore seun"
- 2024: "Lief My Weer Lewendig"
- 2024: "Niks Soos Liefde Nie" (Nothing Like Love)
- 2025: "Wat Dit Ook Al Vat"
- 2025: "Shut up en soen my" with Irene-Louise Van Wyk

== Filmography ==
- Liefling – Die Movie (2010)
- As Jy Sing (2013)
- Free State (2016)
- Mense Mense (2018)
- Spoorloos (2022)
- Eksie Perfeksie (2024)
