= Aschenborn =

Aschenborn is a surname. Notable people with the surname include:

- Dieter Aschenborn (1915–2002), Namibian painter, son of Hans
- Hans Aschenborn (1888–1931), German painter
- Uli Aschenborn (born 1947), South African painter, son of Dieter
