= United Art Rating =

Russian reference book for art market regulations

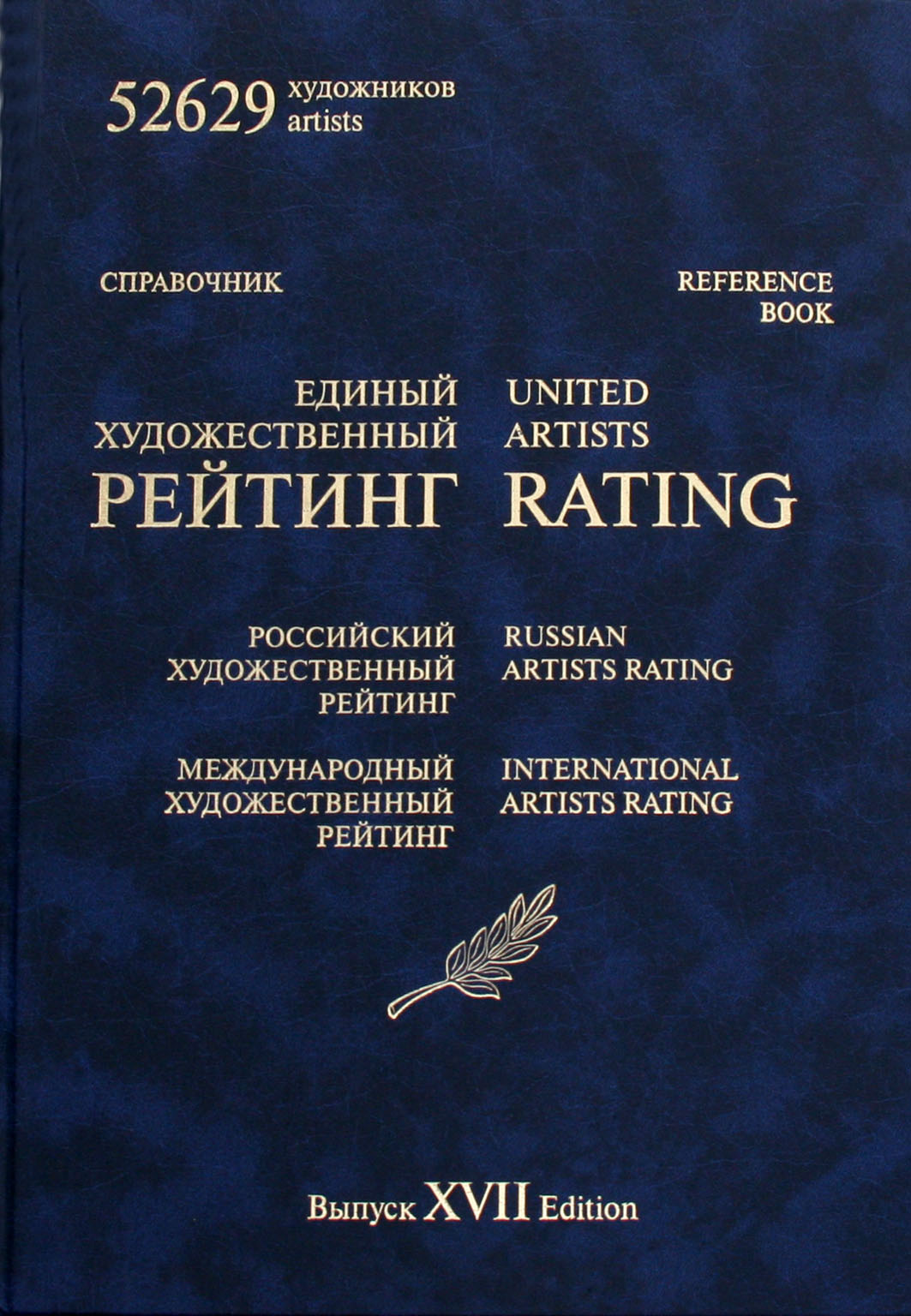
United Art Rating. XVII edition.

United Art Rating is a reference book published since 1999 by Artists Trade Union of Russia as one of the instruments of art market regulations.

== About ==
United Art Rating (before 2012, referred to as United Artists Rating) is a rating published as a periodical reference book, registered as mass media. As of 2016, it has stood 22 printed editions, total number of printed copies is more than 90000. The electronic version is also available.

On January 1, 2016, United Art Rating included the names, dates of life and rating categories of 58965 artists (painters, graphic and poster artists, theatre decorators, batik painters, illustrators, animators, sculptors, jewelers, ceramists, authors of installations etc.).

Editor-in-chief: Sergey Zagraevsky, chairman of Artists Trade Union of Russia, member of Russian Academy of Arts and Russian Academy of Art-critics, Honored culture worker of Russian Federation.

In 2002, United Art Rating was awarded the gratitude of the Minister of culture of Russia.

== Principles of rating ==
The Rating Centre acts under Artists Trade Union of Russia and has a status of an independent professional jury, free in its judges and estimations. Defining rating categories is made on the basis of all available information about works of art, biographies, expositions, collections and sales of works, catalogues and Internet and press publications, art historians' and art-managers' opinions, public opinion polls etc.

United Art Rating consists of 2 sections:

- Russian Art Rating (Rating of artists of Russian Empire, the USSR, Russian emigration, Russian Federation and the republics of the former Soviet Union);
- International Artists Rating (All-world Rating of artists of 18th–21st centuries, forming the world art heritage).

Artists are subdivided into categories "A" and "B": an artist of "A" category does not virtually submit to the market's demand. an artist of "B" category is mainly oriented to the market demand.

Each category has its levels from the first (the top of recognition and fame; is referred to the deceased classic artists, whose works of art are widely recognized in museums) to the seventh one (amateur artist).

According to the declared principles, defining of rating categories is made on available information about expositions, sales and collections of works, catalogues, publications, biographies, public-opinion polls etc. Rating criteria are: art level of works, their humanistic significance, professionalism, exhibitions, works in museums, recognition by the public, galleries and art critics, social and civil significance of works, price level of works etc.

United Art Rating contains pricing recommendations about sale and purchase of works of art.

United Art Rating is constantly changed, refined and supplemented.

== Description of rating categories ==
- 1 – an artist of world fame, tested with time (for no less than a century).
- 1A – a world-famous artist.
- 1B – a high-class professional artist with remarkable organizational skills, who is popular and in demand.
- 2A – a high-class professional artist with a bright creative individuality.
- 2B – a high-class professional artist, recognized and in demand with the art-market and public.
- 3A – a professional artist with a recognizable individual style.
- 3B – a professional artist, recognized and asked for in the art market and by the public.
- 4A – an established professional artist with creative potential.
- 4B – an established professional artist, who is in demand in the art market.
- 5A – a formed professional artist with creative potential.
- 5B – a formed professional artist.
- 6A – a forming professional artist with creative potential.
- 6B – a forming professional artist.
- 7 – an amateur artist with perspective evaluation of specialists.
- 8 – an amateur artist.
- 9 – an artist-beginner.
- 10 – an artist-apprentice.

== International Art Rating ==
International Art Rating includes the first three categories of United Art Rating (i.e. 1, 1A, 1B, 2A, 2B, 3A and 3B). These artists formed and are forming the history of world art of 18th–21st centuries.

International Art Rating includes artists of Argentina, Australia, Austria, Belgium, Bolivia, Brazil, United Kingdom, Bulgaria, Canada, Colombia, Cuba, Czech Republic, Germany, Greece, Hungary, Israel, Italy, Mexico, New Zealand, Norway, Poland, Portugal, Romania, Russia and former Soviet republics, the republics of the former Yugoslavia, United States, Finland, France, Spain, Switzerland, Sweden, Japan and some other countries, such as Namibia.

All famous artists of the period mentioned in the project are represented such as Vincent van Gogh, Pablo Picasso, Henri Matisse, Wassily Kandinsky, Emil Nolde, Joseph Beuys, Andy Warhol just to name a few. From Namibia e.g. the artists Adolph Jentsch, Hans Anton Aschenborn, Dieter Aschenborn and Uli Aschenborn are listed in the project (see 'Internet-project' under 'External links' below). The art of the rated artists form the world art heritage.

Internet-project "Greatest world artists of XVIII–XXI centuries" is created on the base of International Art Rating (about 11000 artists). Before 2014 the project was called "10000 best world artists of XVIII–XXI centuries".

== Printed editions ==
- United Art Rating. XXII edition. 49896 artists. – Moscow, 2015. – 324 p. Number of printed copies – 1100.
- United Art Rating. XXI edition. 47832 artists. – Moscow, 2014. – ISBN 978-5-904913-21-2. 308 p. Number of printed copies – 1100.
- United Art Rating. XX edition. 3816 architects. – Moscow, 2013. – 89 p. Number of printed copies – 1100.
- United Art Rating. XIX edition. 47579 artists. – Moscow, 2012. – ISBN 978-5-904913-19-9. 294 p. Number of printed copies – 1100.
- United Artists Rating. XVIII edition. 53364 artists. – Moscow, 2011. – ISBN 978-5-904913-09-0. 367 p. Number of printed copies – 1100.
- United Artists Rating. XVII edition. 52629 artists. – Moscow, 2010. – ISBN 978-5-904913-03-8. 357 p. Number of printed copies – 5000.
- United Artists Rating. XVI edition. 43084 artists. – Moscow, 2009. – ISBN 978-594-025-112-5. 275 p. Number of printed copies – 5000.
- United Artists Rating. XV edition. 41076 artists. – Moscow, 2008. – ISBN 5-94025-100-5. – 252 p. Number of printed copies – 5000.
- United Artists Rating. XIV edition. 39894 artists. – Moscow, 2008. – ISBN 5-94025-087-4. – 268 p. Number of printed copies – 5000.
- United Artists Rating. XIII edition. 38039 artists. – Moscow, 2007. – ISBN 5-94025-086-6. – 464 p. Number of printed copies – 5000.
- United Artists Rating. XII edition. 36157 artists. – Moscow, 2006. – 447 p. Number of printed copies – 5000.
- United Artists Rating. XI edition. 33405 artists. – Moscow, 2006. – ISBN 5-94025-075-0. – 415 p. Number of printed copies – 5000.
- United Artists Rating. X edition. 30448 artists. – Moscow, 2005. – ISBN 9785940250708. – 368 p. Number of printed copies – 5000.
- United Artists Rating. IX edition. 27754 artists. – Moscow, 2004. – ISBN 5-94025-061-0. – 336 p. Number of printed copies – 5000.
- United Artists Rating. VIII edition.– Jewelry art. – 1689 jewelers. – Moscow,. 2004. ISBN 5-94025-050-5. – 128 p. Number of printed copies – 5000.
- United Artists Rating. VII edition. 21324 artists, 832 exhibition halls. – Moscow, 2003. – ISBN 5-94025-037-8. – 360 p. Number of printed copies – 5000.
- United Artists Rating. VI edition. Architects. – 2124 architects.– Moscow, 2002. – ISBN 5-94025-027-0.– 96 p. Number of printed copies – 5000.
- United Artists Rating. V edition. 12572 artists, 755 exhibition halls. – Moscow, 2002. – ISBN 5-94025-017-3. – 336 p. Number of printed copies – 5000.
- United Artists Rating. IV edition. 9112 artists, 533 exhibition halls. – Moscow, 2001. – ISBN 5-94025-010-6. – 312 p. Number of printed copies – 5000.
- Contemporary and XVIII-XX centuries artists rating. III edition. – 7524 artists. – Moscow, 2000. – ISBN 594025005X. – 320 p. Number of printed copies – 5000.
- Contemporary artists Rating. Painters and graphic artists. 2nd edition. – 3150 artists. – Moscow, 2000. – ISBN 5-94025-003-3. – 117 p. Number of printed copies – 5000.
- Artists Trade Union Rating. Painters and graphic artists. – 1887 artists. – Moscow, 2000. – ISBN 5-94025-001-7. – 80 p. Number of printed copies – 5000.
