= Lola Lonli =

Russian painter

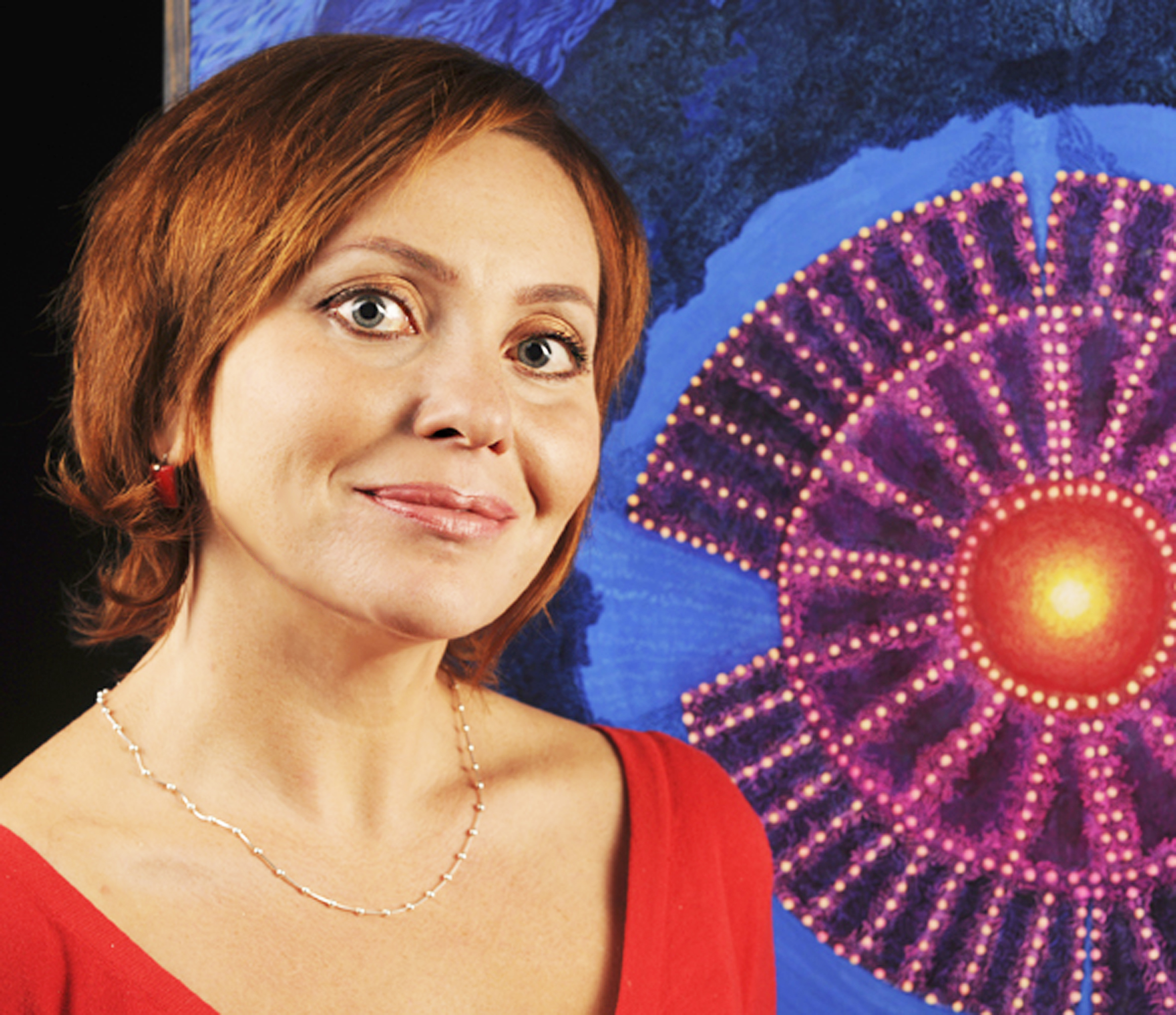
- Lola Lonli and her painting Arkaim Shining, 2013
- Born: Lola Vyacheslavovna Lysikova; July 8, 1973 (age 52); Yelets, Lipetsk Oblast, Russia
- Known for: Painting, Graphics
- Movement: Russian Cosmism

Lola Vyacheslavovna Lonli (born July 8, 1973) is a Russian painter working in the style of Russian cosmism. She is a member of the Artists Trade Union of Russia and The International Federation of Artists. Her works are in permanent collections of the International Centre of Roerichs (Moscow), The V. V. Vereshchagin Mykolaiv Art Museum, Simferopol Art Museum, and the art museum of Gorlovka. In 2013, her paintings were included in the catalogue Russian cosmists of the 20th and 21st centuries published by International Centre of Roerichs. Lonli's paintings are extensively exhibited throughout Russia and Ukraine; she has had more than fifty solo exhibitions and has participated in more than one hundred group exhibitions. She created her own method of art education and established the Treasure of the World art school.

== Biography and work ==
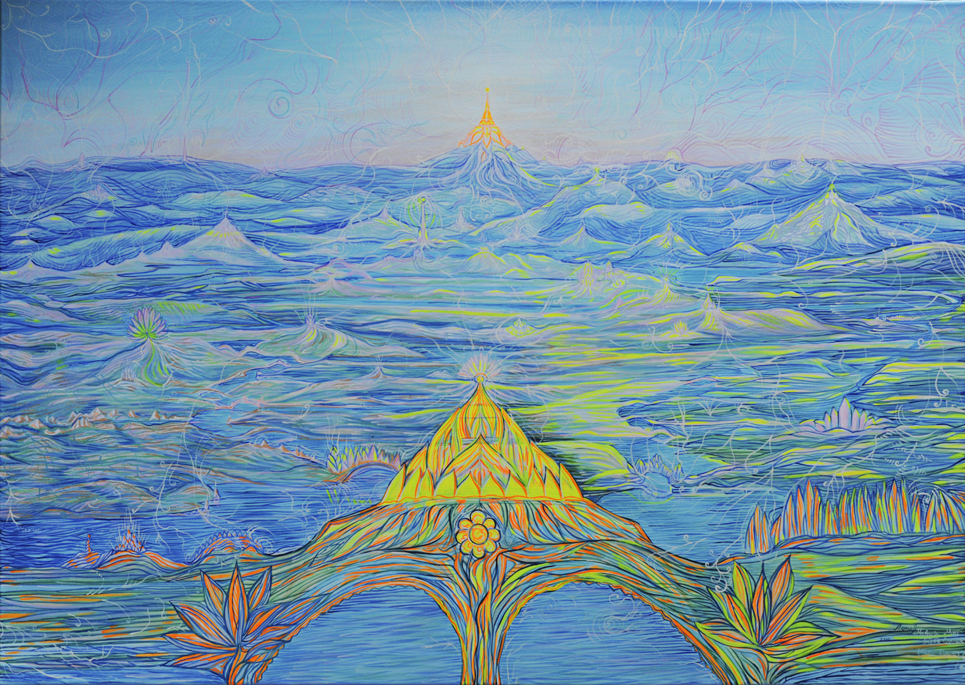
New World. Sun City

Lonli was born in Yelets in Lipetsk Oblast, Russia. She spent her childhood in a village in the Zagorsky District of Moscow Region, Russia.

At the age of two, she started to draw. At the age of four, during a visit to Troitse-Sergiyeva Lavra, she decided she wanted to be an artist. By the age of 15, without assistance, she mastered the techniques of India ink drawing and oil painting.

In 1988, she completed the 8th class of secondary school #2 in Novo-Sinkovo village in Dmitrovsky District, Moscow Oblast. She entered the 1905 College of Arts in Moscow. She left the college after the first year and studied, on her own, anthropology, ethnography, the mythology of various nations, and diverse techniques of drawing and painting. The first public exhibition of her art was in 1989 at a show called the "Destiny of Roads" in Riga.

Since 1993, Lonli has been developing and mastering her own technique of painting with the paints of her own creation, consisting of egg tempera with natural mineral pigments and essential oils. She also continues drawing with India ink. From 1993 to 1995, she participated in joint exhibitions with a group of artists called "Union of African Persons". The first of those exhibitions, called "Invitation to Journey", was held in Moscow in 1993. In 1994 and 1995, together with the Union of African Persons and the Institute of African Studies (part of the Russian Academy of Sciences), she participated in two exhibitions that included music, lectures, selling of African handicrafts, international meetings, and business seminars. From then on, her ever exhibitions have usually been associated with performances of some kind.

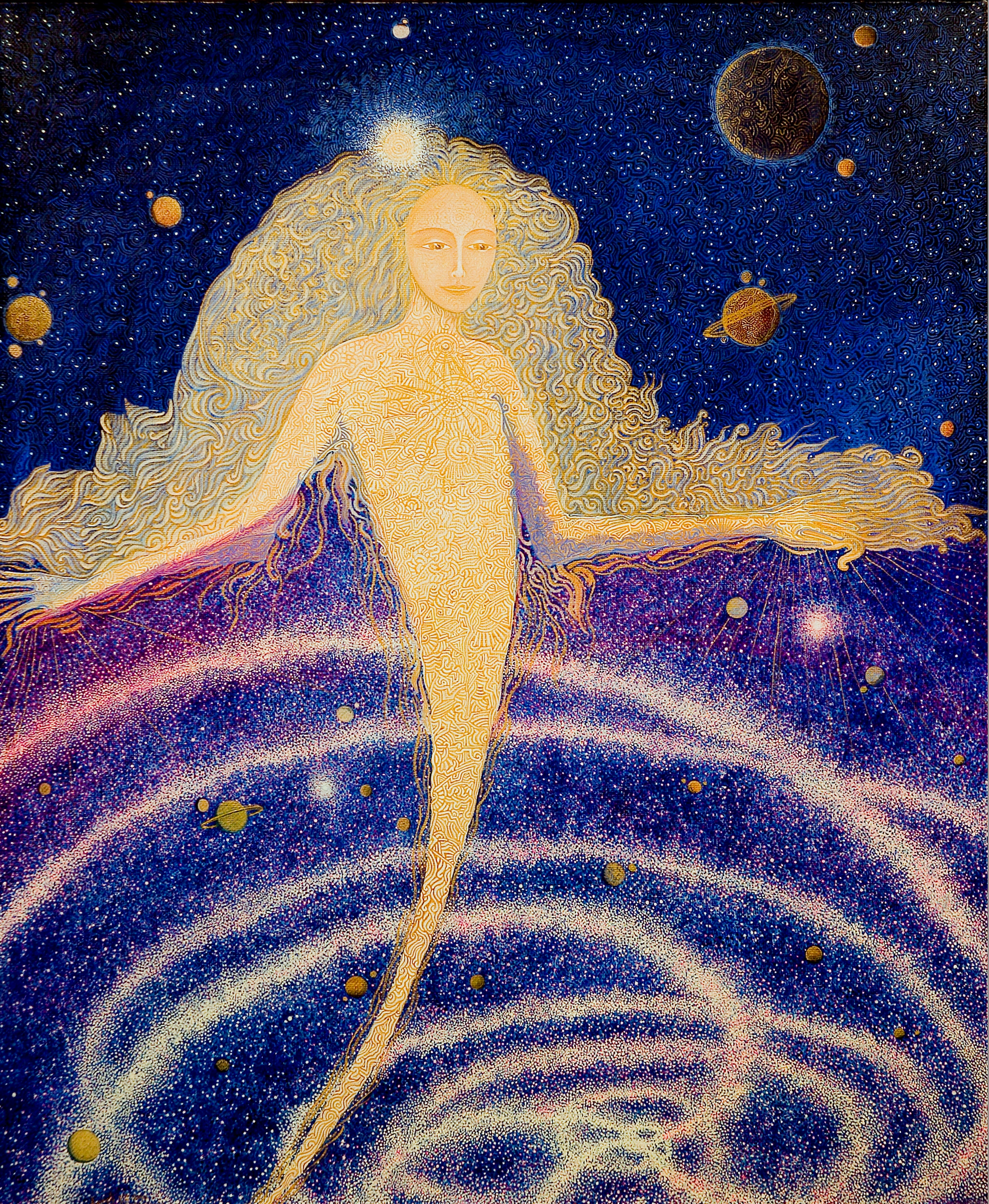
"Free" by Lola Lonli. 2003. Egg tempera on canvas. 115 x 95 cm

In 1996, she joined the Artists Trade Union of Russia and The International Federation of Artists, Moscow branch, drawing department.

In 1999, her first solo exhibition, "Roots of Life are growing into Heaven", was held in the Yakimanka gallery in Moscow. Also in 1999, she began working with Moscow International Centre and its director, L. V. Shaposhnikova. In 2000, another solo exhibition, "Living Legends of Eternity", was held in the museum named by Nicholas Roerich.

From 2000 through 2006, with support of the Ural branch of the International League for Culture Protection and its vice-president, V. P. Anufriev, Lonli put on 12 solo exhibitions in cities and towns in the Ural region, starting in Yekaterinburg.

In 1999, she moved to Mykolaiv, Ukraine. In 2000, she joined an artists' community in Mykolaiv, Ukraine, called "Club of women artists", and had twelve exhibitions with the Club.

In 2001, she established an art school called "Treasure of the World" in Mykolaiv. The school's educational methods were based on her own experience of self-study and methods of pedagogy developed by S. A. Amonashvili. At least 60 people have attended the school, and at least 11 exhibitions of students' artwork have been held in Nikolaev, Kherson, and Ochakov. Students' artwork has been entered in several contests, and they have been given awards at three consecutive biennales of The V. V. Vereshchagin Mykolaiv Art Museum. At the contest "Peace to the Earth – Flag of Peace in the Hands of Children", held in 2006 by the International Centre of Roerichs, all artworks were awarded diplomas, and two of them were printed in Culture and Time magazine.

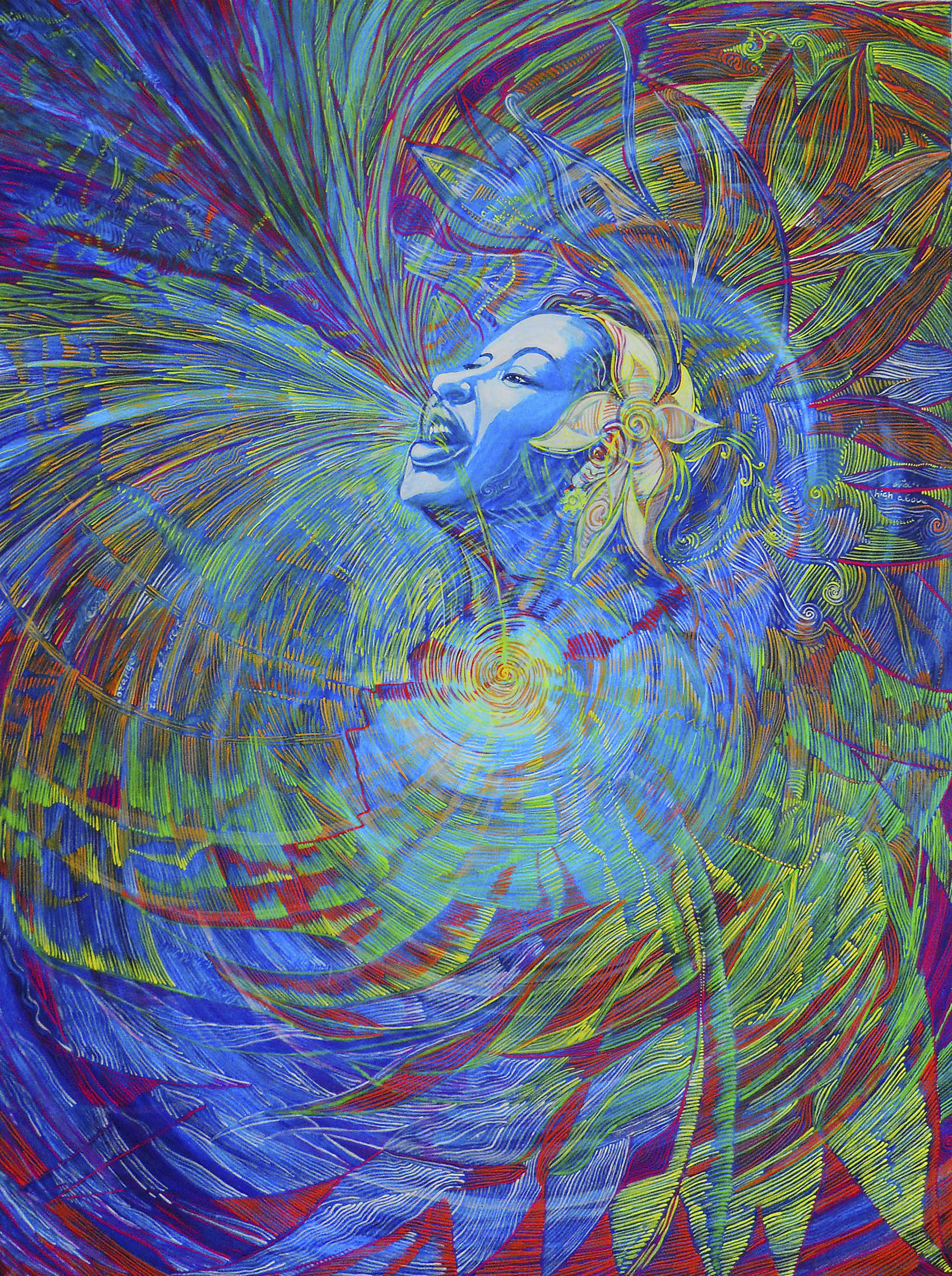
"Billie sings. Billie loves. Billie is happy" by Lola Lonli. 2011. Egg tempera with fluorescent pigments on canvas. 80 x 60 cm

In 2001, Lonli joined the society named after Nicholas Roerich, "Light in the Way", in Mykolaiv. Since 2002, she has been a member of the board of this society. From 2000 to 2006, she had 10 exhibitions in cities and towns of Ukraine, some of them with the support of this society.

In 2003, she took part in exhibition "Unearthly Worlds of Earthly Artists" in the Moscow museum named after Nicholas Roerich.

In 2006, she put on a second personal exhibition in the Moscow Museum named for Nicholas Roerich; the exhibition then visited nine cities in Ukraine, including Dnipropetrovsk, Khmelnytskiy, and Simferopol.

Since 2007, she has collaborated with the Mykolaiv poets' society "Ninth Sphinx" and styled its literary anthology of the same name. There were many poetic and musical performances at her exhibitions, including those in Moscow, Mykolaiv, and Dnipropetrovsk.

In 2009, she returned to Moscow. In 2010, she held several art-music performances with slide shows of her artworks in Moscow clubs in collaboration with the bands "Rada and Blackthorn", "Afrikanda", and "Afru". In March 2010, together with group of cosmist artist she run exhibition and art festival "Cosmic mystery" at the Museum of Nicholas Roerich in Moscow

From 2010 to 2012, she participated in exhibitions put on by the Department of Culture, Western District, Moscow, and the art community "Wind of Wanderings". She also took part in the exhibition "High Water" and was awarded a diploma for best painting.

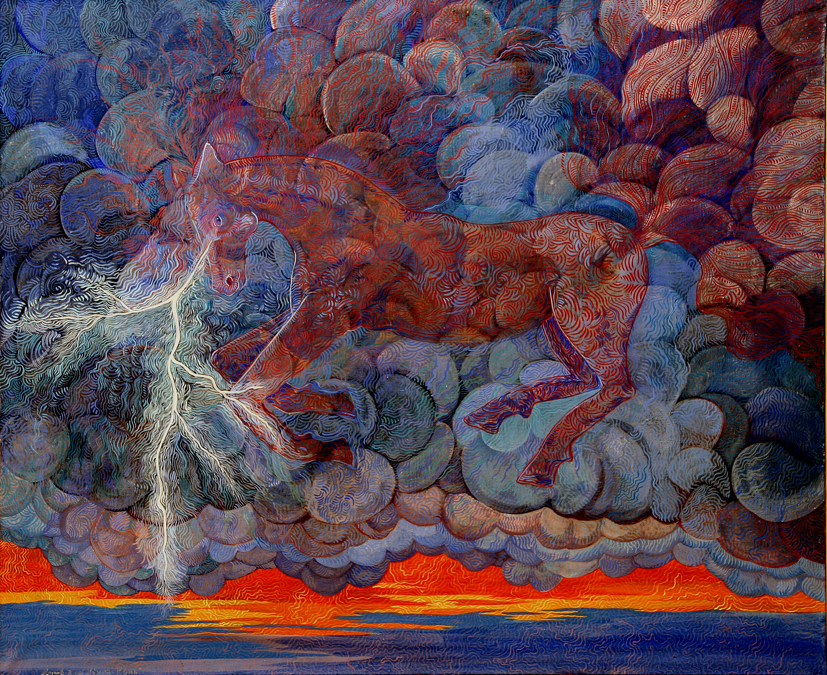
"Thunder Horse" by Lola Lonli. 2000. Egg tempera on canvas. 70 x 85 cm

In 2011, she joined the Artists Trade Union of Russia, Moscow branch. In October 2011, she took part in the exhibition "At the Shores of Different Worlds" in the Moscow museum named for Nicholas Roerich. From 2011 to 2013, she was represented in the US by the Agora Gallery, New York City. In 2012, she participated in the exhibition "Symphony of Color" there.

In February 2013, she participated in the exhibition "Parallax Art Fair", in London.

From June to August 2013, her third solo exhibition, "Multicolored Sparks of Universe", was held in the Moscow museum named for Nicholas Roerich. From October to December 2013, she participated in a large-scale retrospective exhibition, "Russian Cosmists of XX-XXI Centuries". She took part in the international project "Art Cocktail" held in Bruges, Belgium, in November 2013. Also in November 2013, Lonli's solo exhibition "Space of Earthly Legends" began traveling through cities and towns of Siberia.

In February, July, and October 2014, she again took part in "Parallax Art Fair", in London. In September 2014, she organized the group exhibition "Unity" of contemporary Russian cosmist artists in the Moscow museum named for Nicholas Roerich. Starting in September 2014, she conducts master classes in the Museum of Nicholas Roerich in Moscow.

In November 2014, January, 2015 and March, 2015, she participated in exhibitions "Plurality", "Blend" and "Duality" at Camden Image Gallery, London.

In March, 2015, she participated in exhibition "Unity in Variety III" at Gabriel Fine Art Gallery, London.

In August, 2015, Lonli participated in Amsterdam International Art Fair, Amsterdam.

Since October 2015, she runs a class in art studio "Treasure of the World" which was re-opened at the Museum of Nicholas Roerich in Moscow.

In February, 2016, solo exhibition of Lonli's paintings "Flying with Music" took place in Galleri Fjoset, Oslo, Norway.

From 9 to 16 October 2016, her solo exhibition "From ancient legends to the New World" took place at International Roerich Memorial Trust, Naggar, India.

On April 6, 2017, Lonli's solo exhibition 'New World' has been opened at Moscow museum named for Nicholas Roerich. On April 28, the Museum has been seized by the State Museum of Oriental Art and Lonli's exhibition was blocked in museum with no possibility of access.

She currently lives in Moscow.

== Awards and recognition ==
Included in the catalogue "Russian cosmists of XX-XXI centuries" published by International Centre of Roerichs.

Featured Artist of Manhattan Arts International, New York.

Awarded Lifetime Membership of Contemporary Art Gallery Online.

Received Certificate of Honor at 9th Art Contest by Artavita for the painting Billie sings. Billie loves. Billie is happy.

Awarded "Best of Show" for the painting Free at Dreams Art Competition sponsored by Focus Point Shape International Online Art Gallery in March 2014.

Nominee of Artavita 10 contest with painting Arabesque Flame.

Special Recognition for the painting Billie sings. Billie loves. Billie is happy at Figurative Art Exhibition of Light Space & Time Online Gallery, May 2014.

Finalist of the Em*bodied Art online competition by ArtScene Today with painting Arabesque Flame.

Winner of the Traditions juried exhibition by Linus Art Galleries with graphics Secret of a Rhythm.

Graphics Roots of life in the beginnings and Temptation with fruit selected for grand opening exhibition of Colors of Humanity Art Gallery.

Painting Someone's Footprint on the Universe's Face selected for juried exhibition "Pure Abstraction" of Gallery 25N.

Special Recognition for the painting Different Spaces. Intro at "Abstracts" Art Exhibition of Light Space & Time Online Gallery.

4th place in "Abstract" competition by Contemporary Art Gallery Online with the painting Someone's Footprint on the Universe's Face.

Featured at 1st VirArtgallery Prize 2015 with paintings Master of Creative Forces and Someone's Footprint on the Universe's Face .

Runner-up of the second annual Portrait of a Professional Artist call by Professional Artist magazine with the painting Armageddon. Thinking Movement.

Painting Different Spaces. Indigo has been selected by the Fusion Art gallery for the International online juried art exhibition Colorful Abstractions.

Painting Master of Creative Forces won 1st place in nomination 'Professional' at International art exhibition-contest 'Lighting the stars' of Worldwide art-project 'The place where the light is'.

== Critical reception ==
ARTisSpectrum magazine in 2013 said that "Lola Lonli mixes global iconography, mysticism, and real-life cultural figures to create intricate images that layer pattern with surreal representation."

Manhattan Arts International described her works as follows: "Positive messages, rhythmic, swirling patterns, intense colors, and bold design characterize her works of art. She combines unique and skillful painting, drawing and mixed media techniques with egg tempera and fluorescent pigment."

Professional Artist magazine in 2014 said: "Her inspirational art works come to fruition when she is in deep concentration. Her art seems to automatically flow through her onto the canvas."
