= Philip Kojo Metz =

German-Ghanaian artist and photographer

- Born: Philip Kojo Metz; 1971 (age 54–55); Germany
- Occupations: Artist; Photographer
- Years active: 1990s-present

Philip Kojo Metz (born 1971) is a German-Ghanaian conceptual artist and photographer. He received international attention with his work SORRYFORNOTHING.

== Biography ==
Philip Kojo Metz was born in Germany. He began his career in the 1990s.

== Exhibitions and productions ==
2020

- Wagner 2025: Future Race, Gegenwarten / Presences, Chemnitz

2019

- SORRYFORNOTHING – eine skulpturale Intervention, 24. Oktober 2019, Teil der Berlin Ausstellung im Humboldt Forum Berlin

2016

- Deutscher Kolonialismus, Fragmente seiner Geschichte und Gegenwart, Deutsches Historisches Museum Berlin
- The Mimicry Games, KWADRAT, Berlin
- 1884 to 1915 – An Artistic Position, National Art Gallery of Namibia, Windhoek, 5 February – 12 March

2015

- Fresh Fish for Fritz, Friedrichsbau, Bühl

2014

- Eagle Africa, Goethe-Institut Accra

2012

- 2ThePowerOf2, Berlin
