= Artists Trade Union of Russia =

Artists Trade Union of Russia (Профессиональный союз художников РоссииRussian: Профессиональный союз художников России) is an All-Russian trade union of artists (painters, graphic artists, sculptors, masters of decorative and applied arts etc.), art historians, museum and gallery workers etc.

== About ==
Artists Trade Union of Russia was registered in 1999. Its main purpose is the protection of creators’ rights.

Artists Trade Union of Russia acts in 55 regions of Russia and 9 foreign countries. It unites more than 5300 of artists and other art workers. It consists of 11 profile sections, exhibition committees and organizations, PR-service, legal service, the protection service of historic-cultural and architectural heritage, producing centre, other services, organizations and interest groups.

First chairman of Artists Trade Union of Russia – Dr. Sergey Zagraevsky, painter, art-critic, member of Russian Academy of Arts and Russian Academy of Art-critics, Honored culture worker of Russian Federation. Chairman of the Artists Trade union of Russia (since 2020) – Prof. Dr. Nikolay Sednin, painter, art-critic, Honorary President of International Academy of Contemporary Arts.

== Main projects ==
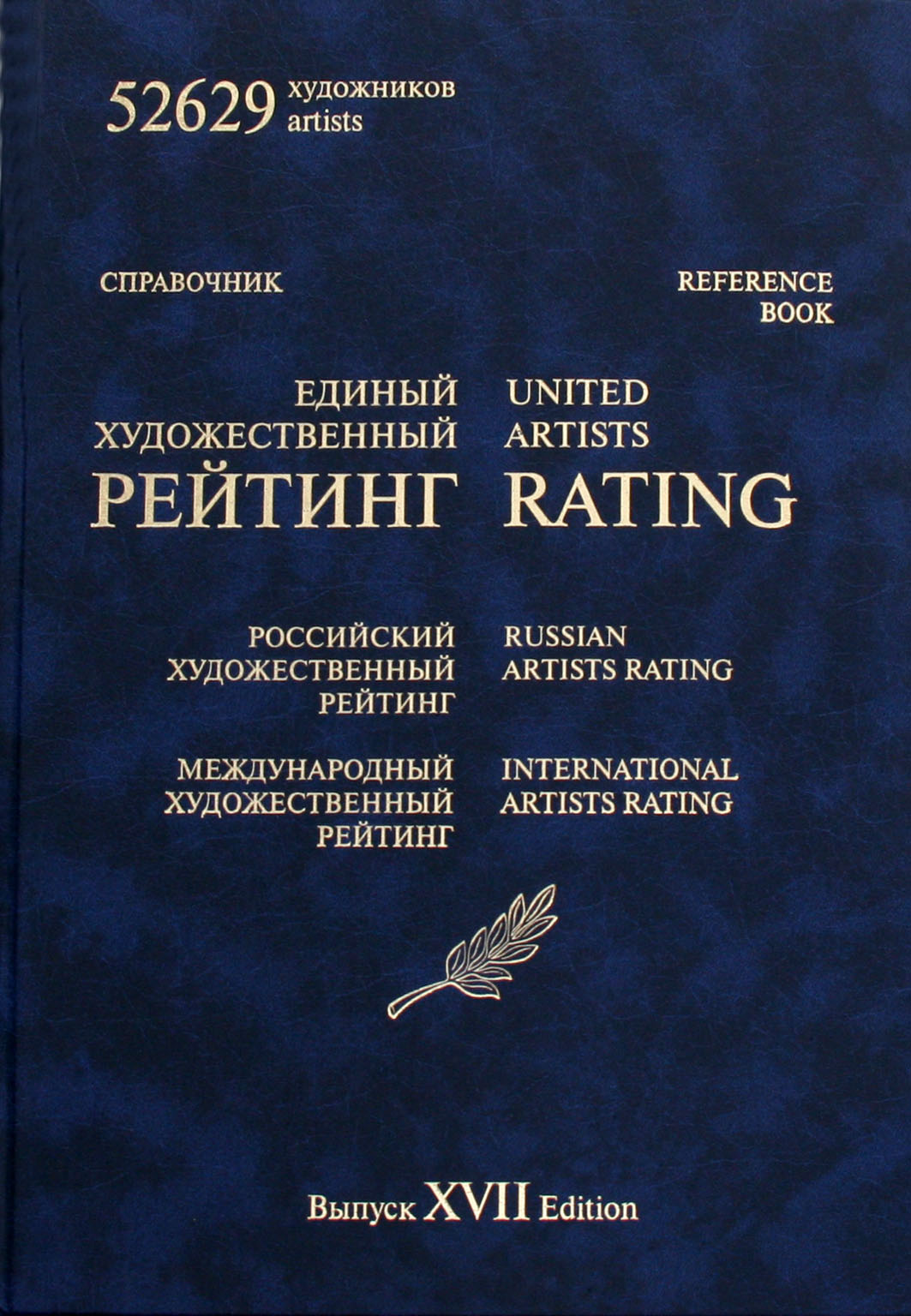
United Art Rating. XVII edition.

- Artists Trade Union of Russia regularly publishes the reference book "United Art Rating" (called "United Artists Rating" before 2012). The reference book "United Art Rating" has been published since 1999 as a periodical reference book, registered as mass media. As of 2016, it has stood 22 printed editions, total number of printed copies is more than 90000. The electronic version is also available. On 1 January 2016, United Art Rating included the names, dates of life and rating categories of 58965 artists (painters, graphic and poster artists, theatre decorators, batik painters, illustrators, animators, sculptors, jewelers, ceramists, authors of installations etc.).
- Artists Trade Union of Russia holds the Register of professional artists of Russian Empire, the USSR, Russian Federation and the former Soviet Union republics (more than 49000 artists).
- Artists Trade Union of Russia works at Internet-project "Greatest world artists of XVIII–XXI centuries" (about 11000 artists). The project includes artists of Argentina, Australia, Austria, Belgium, Bolivia, Brazil, Britain, Bulgaria, Canada, Colombia, Cuba, Czech Republic, Germany, Greece, Hungary, Israel, Italy, Mexico, New Zealand, Norway, Poland, Portugal, Romania, Russia and former Soviet republics, the republics of the former Yugoslavia, the USA, Finland, France, Spain, Switzerland, Sweden, Japan and some other countries, who are in the first three categories of United Art Rating (i.e. 1, 1A, 1B, 2A, 2B, 3A and 3B).
