= Hans Aschenborn =

German painter

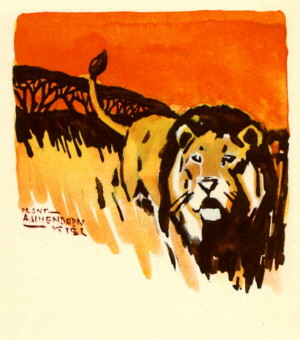
Male Lion, watercolour, Kiel (Germany)

Hans Anton Aschenborn (1 February 1888 – 10 April 1931) was a renowned animal painter of African wildlife. He is the father of Dieter Aschenborn and the grandfather of Hans Ulrich Aschenborn, both painters.

Hans Anton worked both in Germany and in southern Africa where his work is featured in the older German Thieme-Becker or Saur art encyclopedia. A Master of Arts thesis by Karin Skawran concerning the graphic works of Hans Anton Aschenborn was published in the South African art and culture periodical, Lantern in 1965.) In 1963 the University of Pretoria published a book about Aschenborn as an artist entitled, Hans Anton Aschenborn : Mens en Kunstenaar. In 1970 another one followed by the Pretoria Art Museum (South Africa) and a doctoral dissertation concerning his work was done. Other publications on Aschenborn feature his etchings and linocuts.

He is well known for his illustrations of books and as an author and poet. Many of his works still are featured and may be found on the Internet. He was revered as a pioneer in the realistic portrayal of African wildlife. In 1916 he wrote the lyrics of the song, "Heia Safari", which also remains popular. Some of his German books were translated into Afrikaans, giving him a role in Afrikaans literature. While working on his book about gemsbok (which was also translated into English) and closely observing them, Aschenborn discovered a variety that has been named after him, Genus Aschenborni.

In southern Africa, he has been honored frequently with dedications. In Windhoek (Namibia) there is the Aschenborn Street, and in Cape Town (South Africa) the Hans Aschenborn Road.

== Biography ==
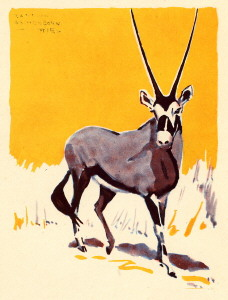
Gemsbok, watercolour, Kiel (Germany)

He was born in Kiel, Germany. In 1909, he emigrated to Namibia, where in 1912 he bought a farm named, "Quickborn". In 1913 he married Emma Bredow. He moved with his family to South Africa in 1920, before returning to Germany in 1921. He died in Kiel during April 1931.

His son, Dieter Aschenborn (15 November 1915 – 11 September 2002), and his grandson, Uli Aschenborn (6 September 1947), also are well-known animal painters in the south of Africa. The art work of all three Aschenborns may be found in the galleries, museums, and public buildings of Namibia. and an exhibition of the work of all three generations was held in Namibia during 1965.

== Exhibitions (selection) ==
- 1965 3 Generations Aschenborn Windhoek (Namibia)
- 1981 Hans Anton Aschenborn Commemorative Exhibition - Arts Association Namibia (now National Art Gallery of Namibia), Windhoek

== Bibliography ==
- Vollmer, Hans (1953), Allgemeines Lexikon der bildenden Künstler des XX. Jahrhunderts, Volume 1, E. A. Seemann, Leipzig, p. 71
- Allgemeines Künstlerlexikon (1992), Die Bildenden Künstler aller Zeiten und Völker, Volume 5, Saur, Munich 1992, pp. 383
- Kloppers, Sas (2012) Directory of Namibian Artists, Dream Africa Productions and Publishing, ISBN 978-0-620-51746-1
- Roos, Nico (1978), Art in South-West Africa, Aschenborn’s art (apart that from other Namibian artists) is also covered in the book of Nico Roos – being a renowned Namibian artist himself ISBN 0799303445

== Artwork ==
- Aschenborn, Paul. "Art of Four Generations - art of all three Aschenborns (mainly of Uli Aschenborn)" (in German). Archived from the original on 21 June 2018 – via Wayback Machine.

== See also ==
- List of German painters
