= The V. V. Vereshchagin Mykolaiv Art Museum =

Coordinates: 46.973215°N 31.986008°E

The V. V. Vereshchagin Mykolaiv Art Museum (Ukrainian: Миколаївський обласний художній музей імені В.В.Верещагіна) is the museum of art, which is located in Mykolaiv, Ukraine.

== History ==
The V. V. Vereshchagin Mykolaiv Art Museum
- Established: 1914
- Location: Ukraine, Mykolaiv
- Type: Art Museum

The museum was established in 1914 by the members of a local society of fans of the fine arts, as a monument to artist, Vasily Vereschagin. The first collection of the museum was placed in the former guardroom of a military department. It included works which were donated by the Academy of Arts, Alexander's III Russian museum, and items which were sent by V. V. Vereschagin's widow, Lydia Vasilyevna.

On the eve of the Great Patriotic War, the collection museum totaled almost 1000 works. In the days of fascist occupation the museum was plundered. Restoration began when Nikolaev was released. In 1945, the museum restored the work in the small ancient estate.

The museum includes works owned by V. V. Vereschagin, and works by authors such as I.K. Ayvazovsky, R.G. Sudkovsky, and M.M. Antokolsky. Other museums participated in the formation of a post-war collection including the Kiev museum of Russian art, the Kiev museum of the Western and Oriental art, and the Odessa art museum.

During the 1970–1980 period, the museum's collection was regularly replenished at the expense of the USSR, Union of Artists of the USSR, and other organizations, as well as from private collections.

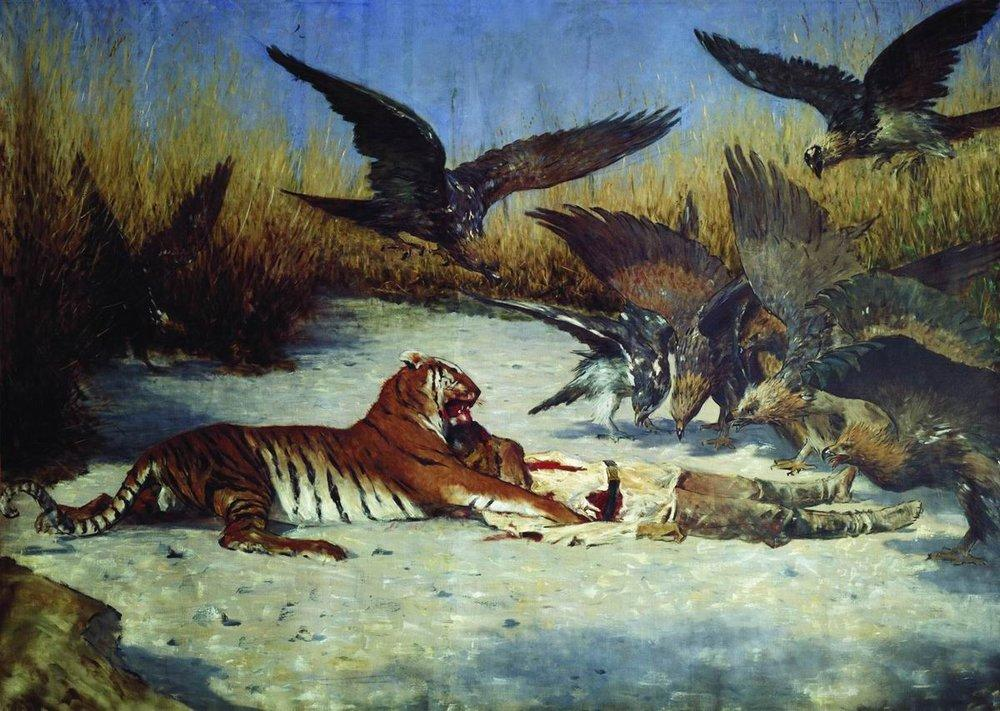
Cannibal by V.V.Verschagin

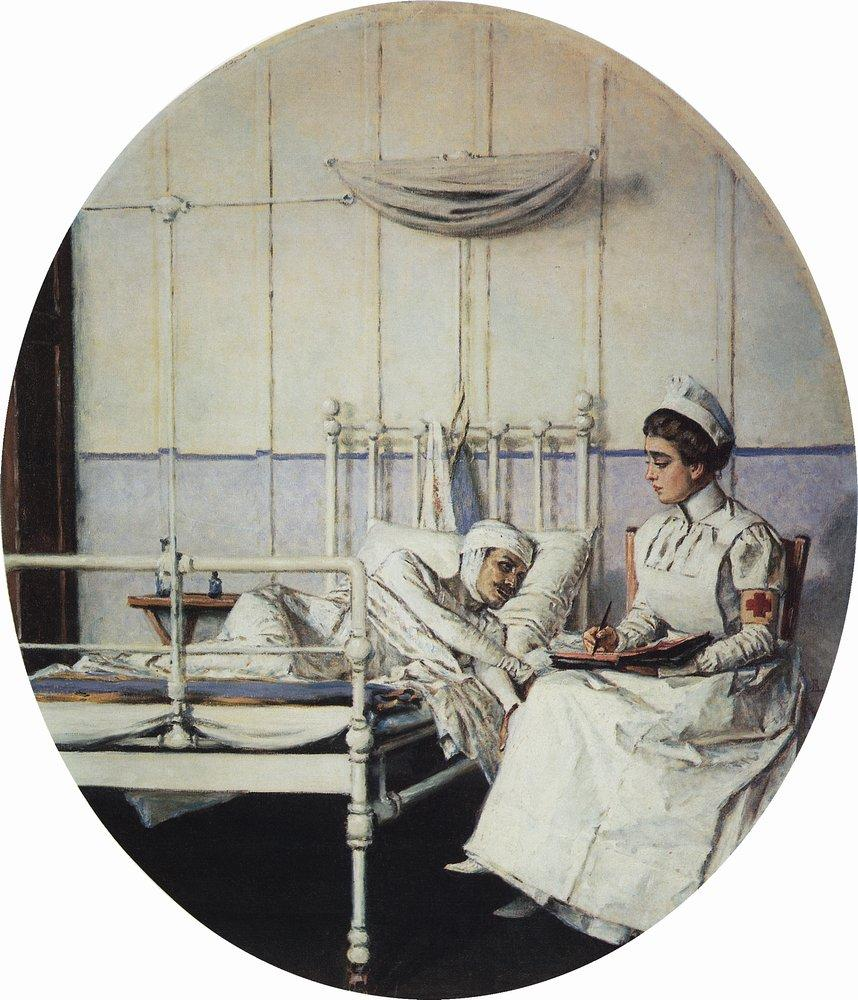
Letter to home (Letter to Mother) by V.V.Vereschagin

From 1980 to 1990, special attention was given to the artistic traditions of the region. The Nikolaev organization of Artists bought the oldest works of the artists D.K. Krainev, R. S. Sokolov, S.M. Starcheusa, V.I. Firsov and others. Today Vasily Vereshchagin's Museum of Art has the most comprehensive collection of works by contemporary artist of Nikolaev: M. Ryasnyansky, V.I. Zolotukhin, D.A. Antonyuk, A.P. Zavgorodny, N.F. Berezhnoy, Y.A Bulavitskogo, S.F. Sienkiewicz, N.A. Mandrikova-Donchik, and V.S. Pokosenko.

In 1986, the museum moved to a new, spacious house. There is an exposition of national art in the halls on the second and third floors including paintings, sculpture, arts and crafts and graphic arts. There is a separate hall in the museum where works of West European art are shown.

The Russian Academy of Arts and the Charitable Foundation of Preservation of inheritance of V. V. Vereschagin awarded the museum a gold medal for restoration work of the artist, and preservation and promotion of the artist's oeuvre in 2002. According to the decision of the presidium of the Ukrainian Academy of Arts, the museum was awarded a silver medal on July 28, 2009, for the promotion of art, for merits in aesthetic education of young generation, and in view of the 95th anniversary of the foundation day.
