= Dieter Aschenborn =

Namibian painter

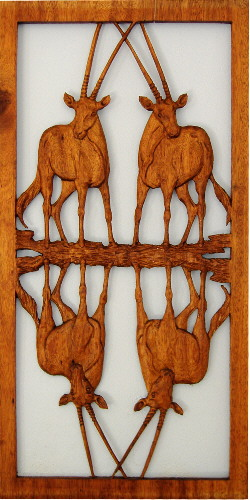
”Two Oryx” about 1970, Woodcut 110 x 50 cm

Dieter Aschenborn (15 November 1915 in Okahandja, Namibia – September 2002 in Windhoek, Namibia) was a Namibian painter. He was the son of the animal painter Hans Aschenborn.

== Biography ==
At the age of six, he moved with his family from Namibia (at that time South West Africa) to Stellenbosch in South Africa and shortly thereafter to Kiel, Germany. Later, Dieter Aschenborn returned to South Africa to work as a farmer. In the second World War, he was interned. After the war, Aschenborn became the first game warden of the Etosha National Park till 1952. In the park he developed his leather paintings which earned him a reputation in Southern Africa. He moved to Windhoek, and he was able from now on to live entirely from his art.

Aschenborn is especially known as an animal painter of African wildlife. He made himself also a name with drawings and sculptures, especially reliefs cut out of wood, which together with murals of his decorate several public buildings in Namibia. He also designed postage stamps for Namibia. He also painted on leather and parchment.

Dieter's son Uli Aschenborn is also an artist.

== Exhibitions ==
=== Solo ===
- 1966 Bloemfontein (South Africa)

=== Group ===
- 1965 "Three generations Aschenborn", Municipal Building, Windhoek
- 1968 Schloss Kranichstein, Darmstadt, Germany
- 1968 Interfauna "Im Reich der Tiere", Düsseldorf, Germany
- 1983 "Namibian Artists" University of Pretoria, South Africa
- 1992 "Eight and a half Aschenborn", Kendzia Galerie, Windhoek
- 2004 "Three Aschenborn", Kendzia Galerie, Windhoek
