= Sergey Zagraevsky =

Russian-Israeli painter (1964–2020)

Sergey Zagraevsky סרגיי זגרייבסקי
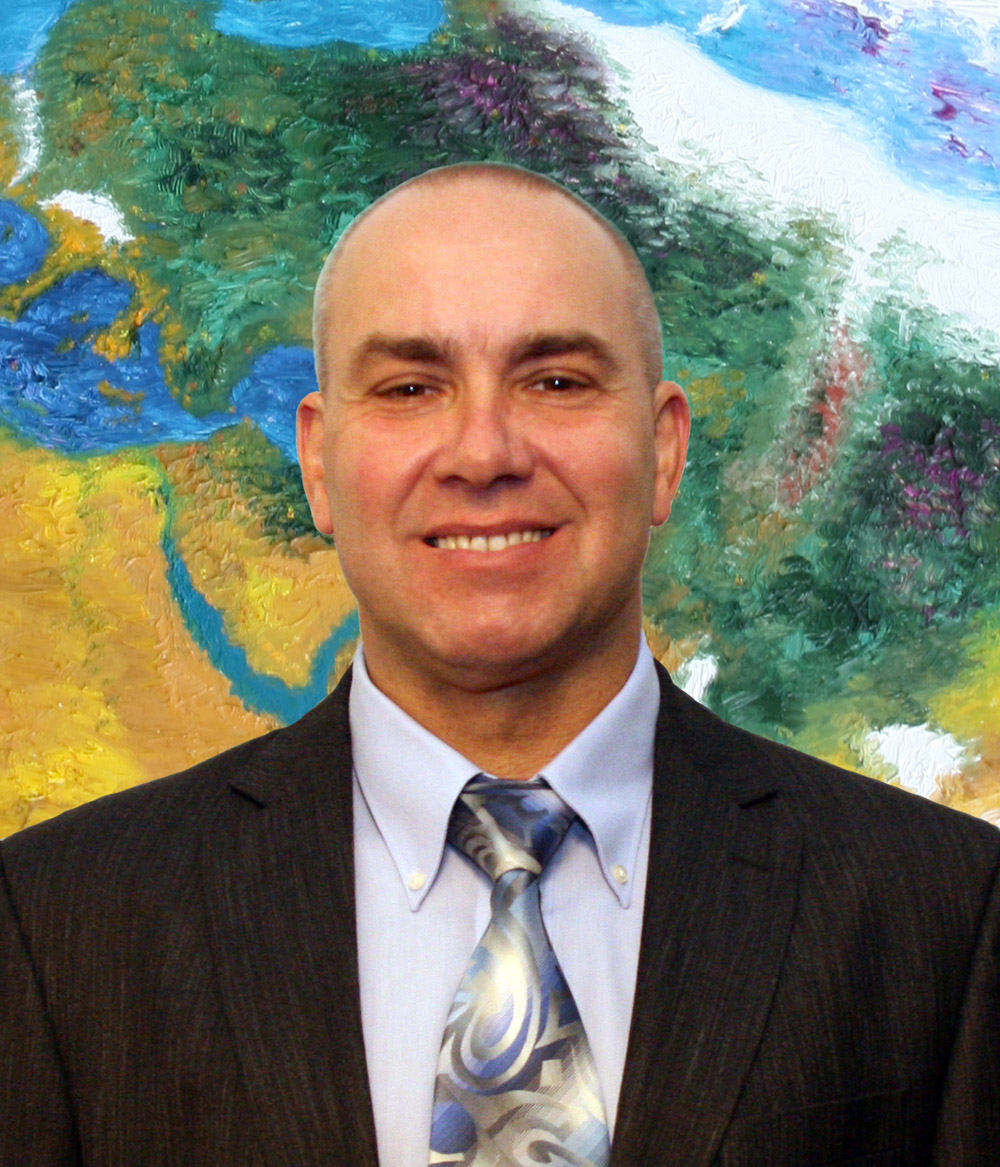
- Zagraevsky in 2011
- Born: 20 August 1964; Moscow, Soviet Union
- Died: 6 July 2020 (aged 55); Moscow, Russia
- Education: Private Studio of Tatiana Mavrina
- Known for: Painting, art critic
- Movement: Close to naïve art, primitivism
- Awards: Honored culture worker of Russia, Member of Russian Academy of Arts

Sergey Zagraevsky (Russian: Сергей Вольфгангович Заграевский, Hebrew: סרגיי זגרייבסקי; August 20, 1964 – 6 July 2020) was a Russian-Israeli painter, architectural historian, writer and theologian.

== Biography ==
Zagraevsky was the son of architectural historian Wolfgang Kawelmacher (1933–2004) and poet and dramatist Inna Zagraevsky (born 1933).

He began to paint at school and his first teacher was the Russian painter Tatiana Mavrina.

Between 2002 and 2005 Zagraevsky taught at the Moscow Institute of Restoration Arts, and subsequently at the Russian University of Intellectual Property and in the Vladimir-Souzdal Museum. The main themes of his architectural history research are ancient Russian white-stone buildings, the early architecture of Moscow and architectural connections between ancient Russia and Romano-Gothic Europe. His doctoral thesis was "North-Eastern Russian architecture from the end of 13th – first third of the 14th century".

Zagraevsky was the chief editor of the reference work "United Art Rating" and the author of a number of books on philosophy, theology and the history of architecture. He has written a number of children's stories and many articles of art criticism. He was the founder and curator of "RusArch" – the electronic scientific library on History of Old Russian architecture.

In 1992 he became a PhD of technique, received his doctorate in architecture in 2004, then became a Professor in 2005. Zagraevsky was also a full member of Russian art critics Academy (since 2001), the AICA (since 2004), and the Writers union of Russia (since 2001), an Honored culture worker of Russia (since 2009), a member of Russian Academy of Arts (since 2013).

Spoke Russian, English, Hebrew, German, French, Esperanto.

Zagraevsky died on July 6, 2020, due to an acute cardiovascular failure.

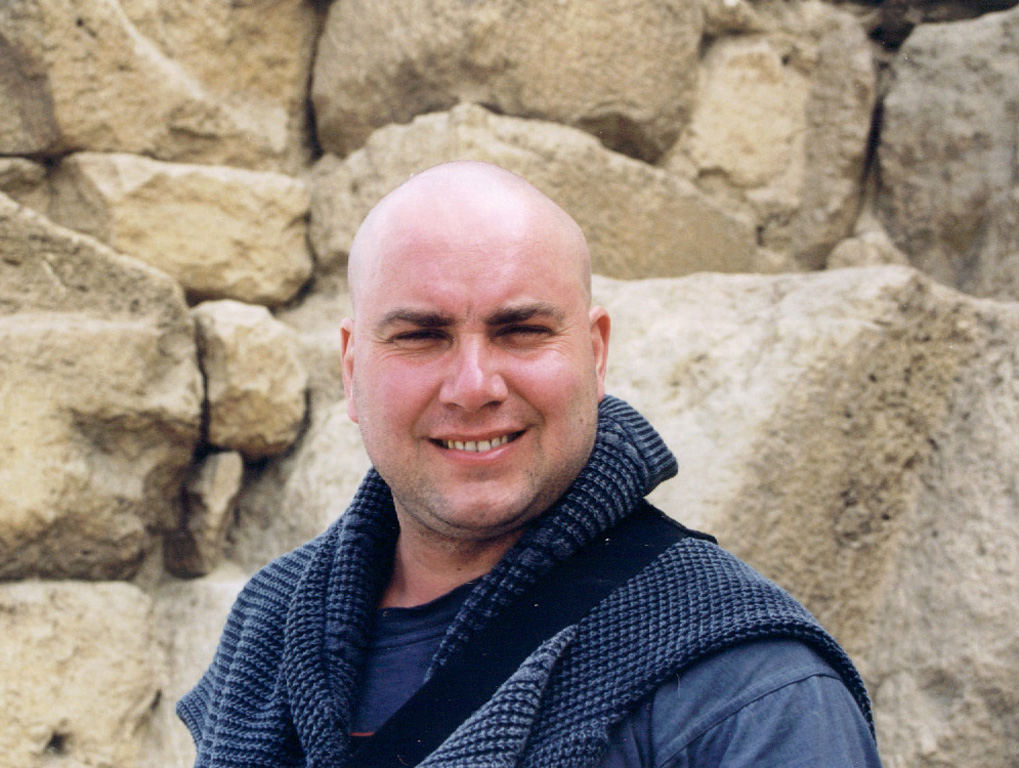
Sergey Zagraevsky

== Art ==
Zagraevsky's art does not belong to the classic primitive or naïve schools, since neither the formal nor actual parameters of primitive art are met. Instead, his style was best described as "primitivism", a genre which includes the "primitive" paintings of many artists who had an academic apprenticeship and extensive experience in other styles such as Paul Gauguin, Mikhail Larionov, Pablo Picasso and Paul Klee. There are some differences in Zagraevsky's style; his landscape paintings are "childish" in using a reverse perspective, the absence of chiaroscuro and the relatively accurate portrayal of parts. Zagraevsky uses predominantly open colours giving his paintings brightness comparable to children's painting. His paintings contain neither humour nor violence as these are not normally seen in the art of children.

Since about 2000, Zagraevsky's works became slightly more generalized and varied while retaining their brightness. Details are drawn less carefully although the works remain "childish", with the hand of an experienced artist visible only in the stability of the stroke, the virtuoso technique of painting and drawing, and the compositional and the color balance. There remain recurring features in his art such as a "flattened" sun, squat trees with huge roots, multi-colored water, "album-styled" flowers and illuminated windows.

In the 1990s Bulat Okudzhava wrote of Zagraevsky:

When he moves on a picture his fist,
God is at his assist.
God is with him all his way.
That is the painter Sergey.

== Sample works ==
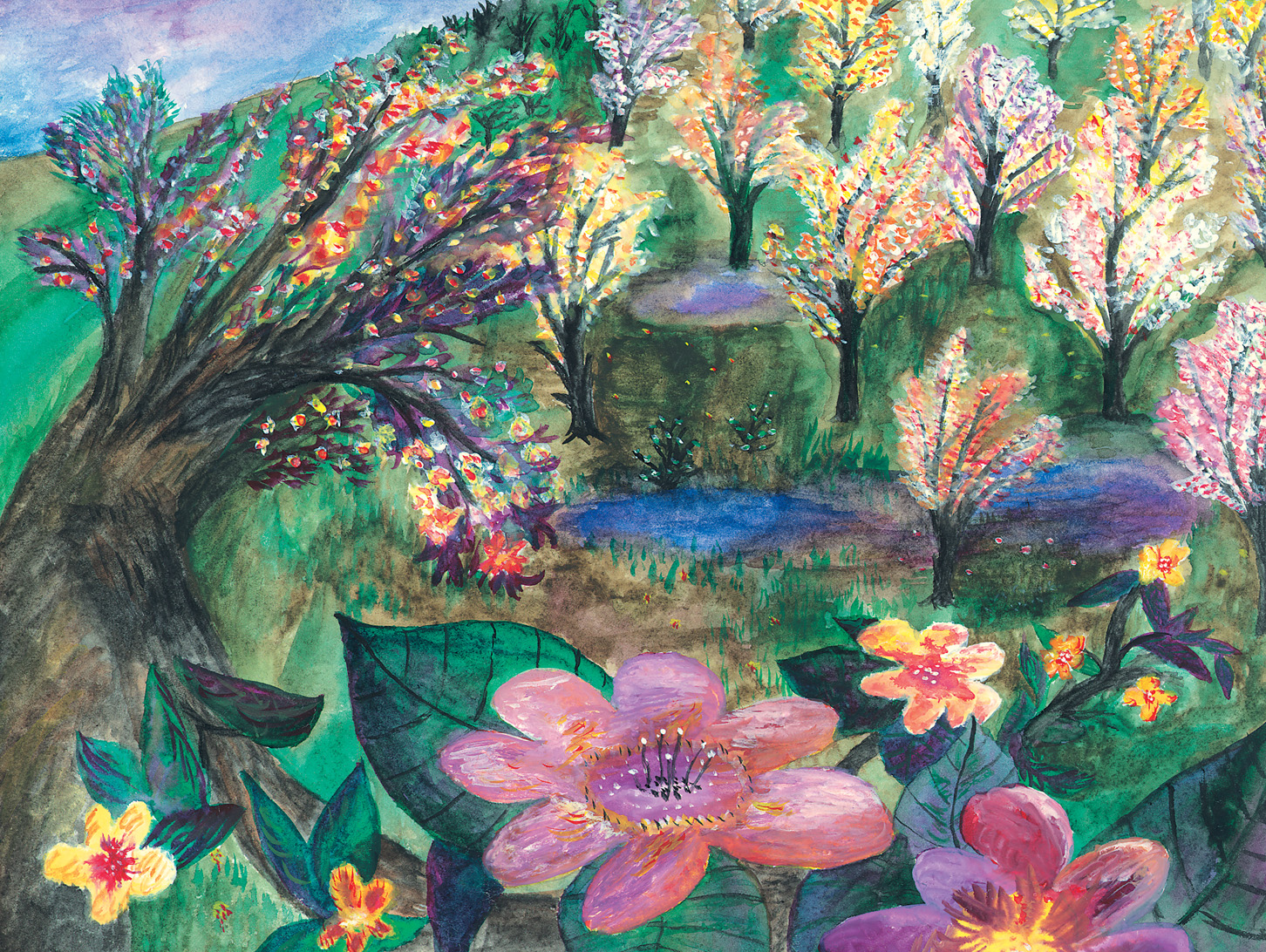
Sergey Zagraevsky. Apple Garden. 18x24 wat.col. 1992.

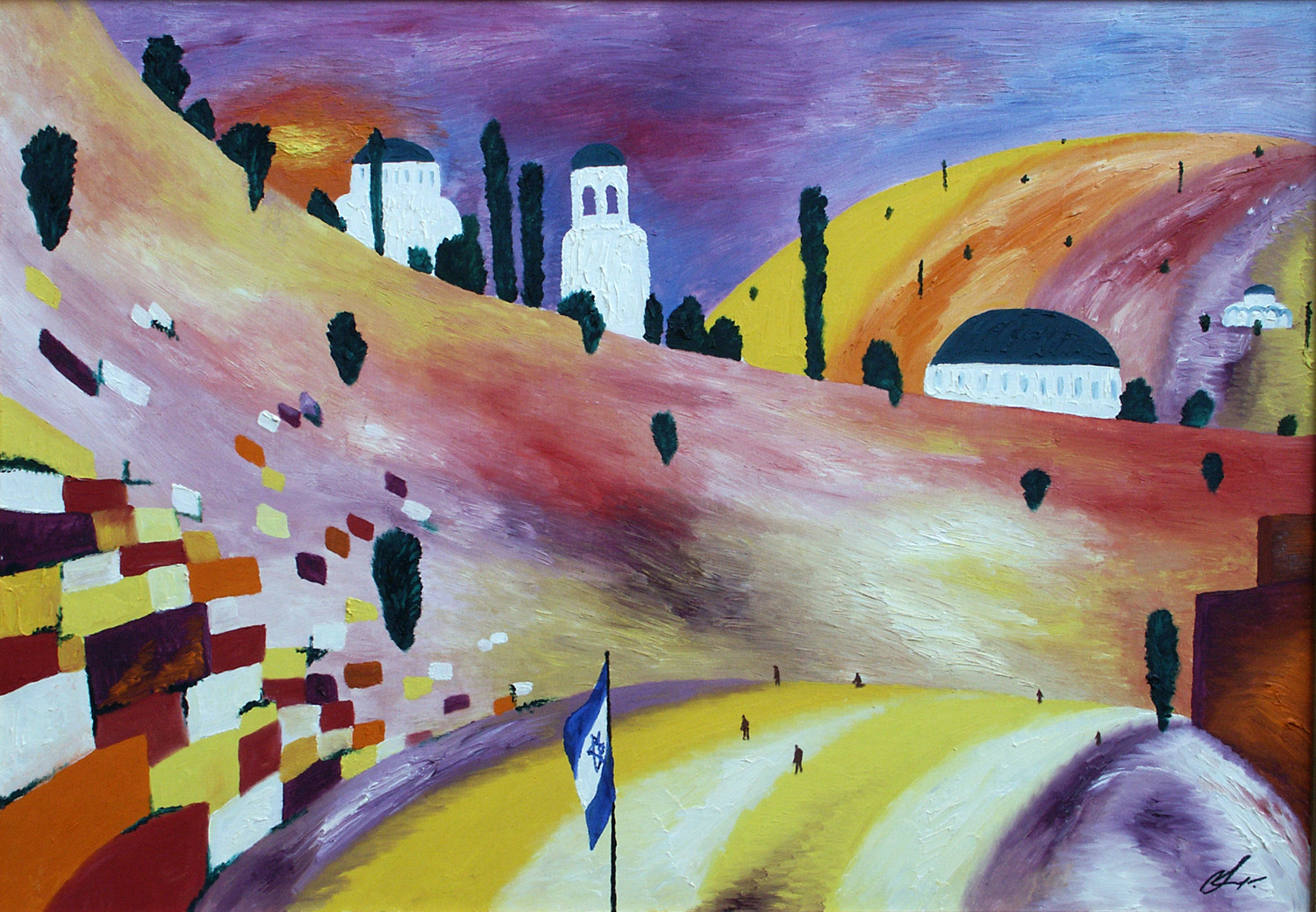
Sergey Zagraevsky. Jerusalem. The Western Wall. 70x100 oil, canvas. 1998.

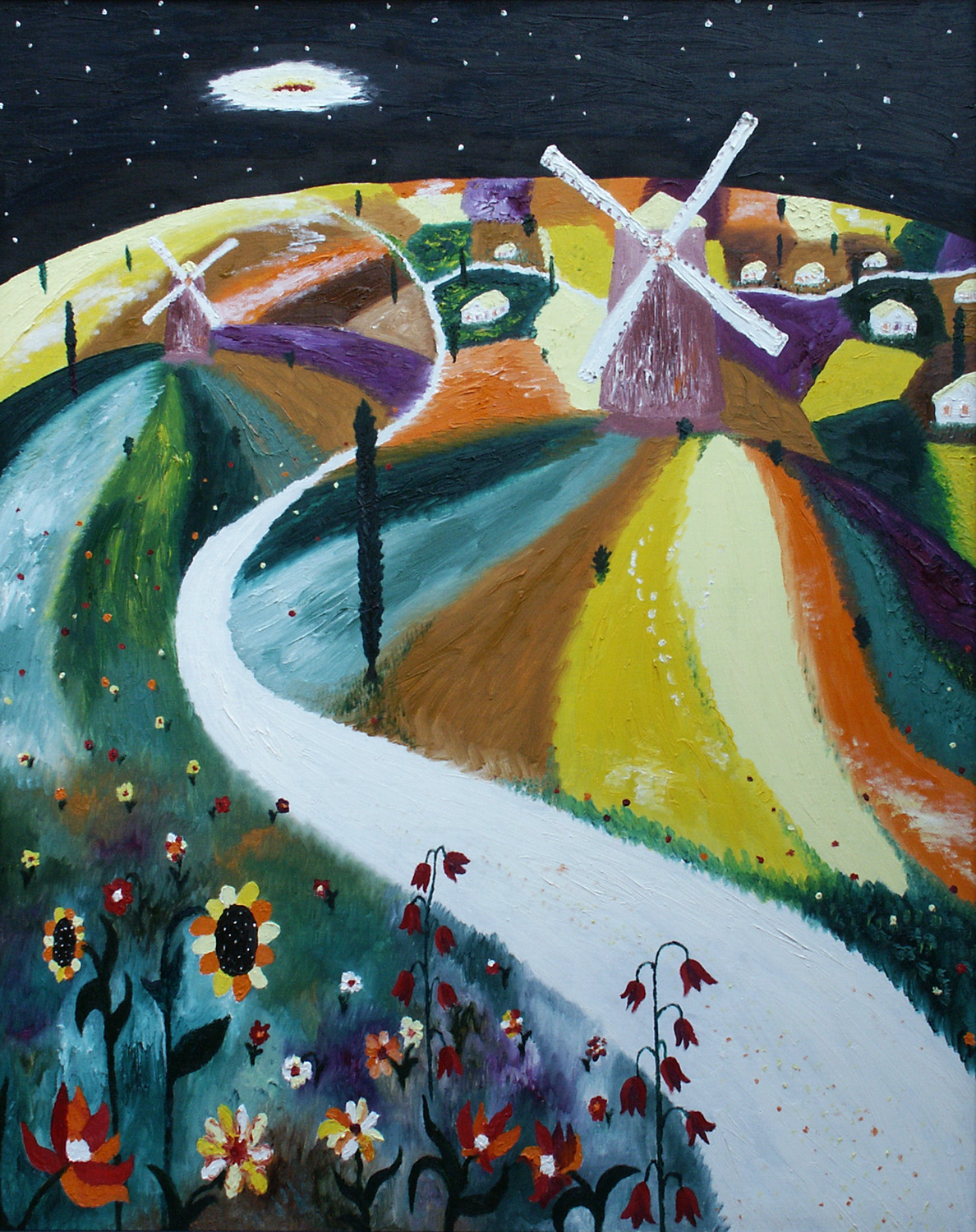
Sergey Zagraevsky. Ukrainian night. 100x80 oil, canvas. 1999.

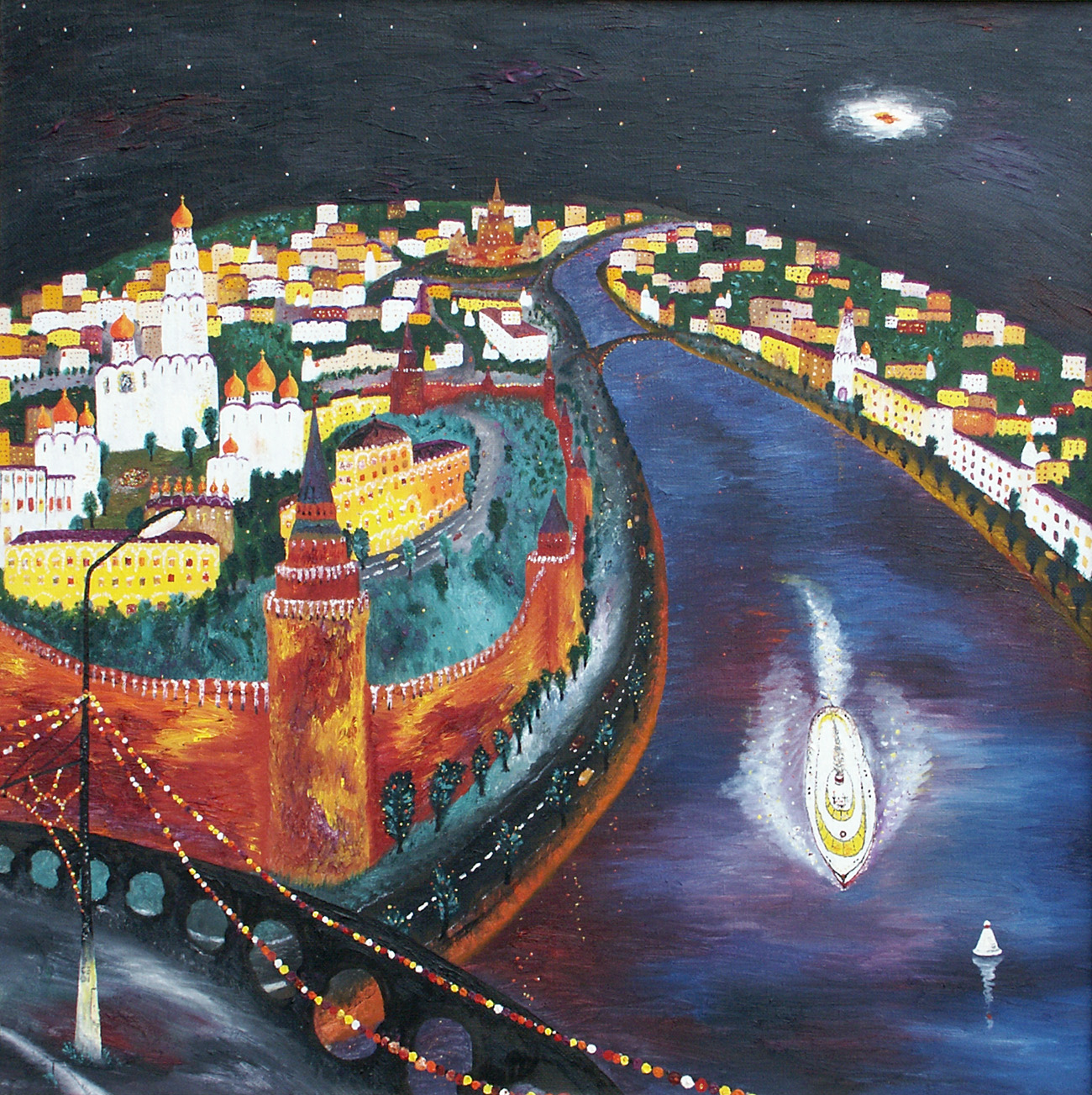
Sergey Zagraevsky. Moscow, Kremlin. 100x100 oil, canvas. 2001.

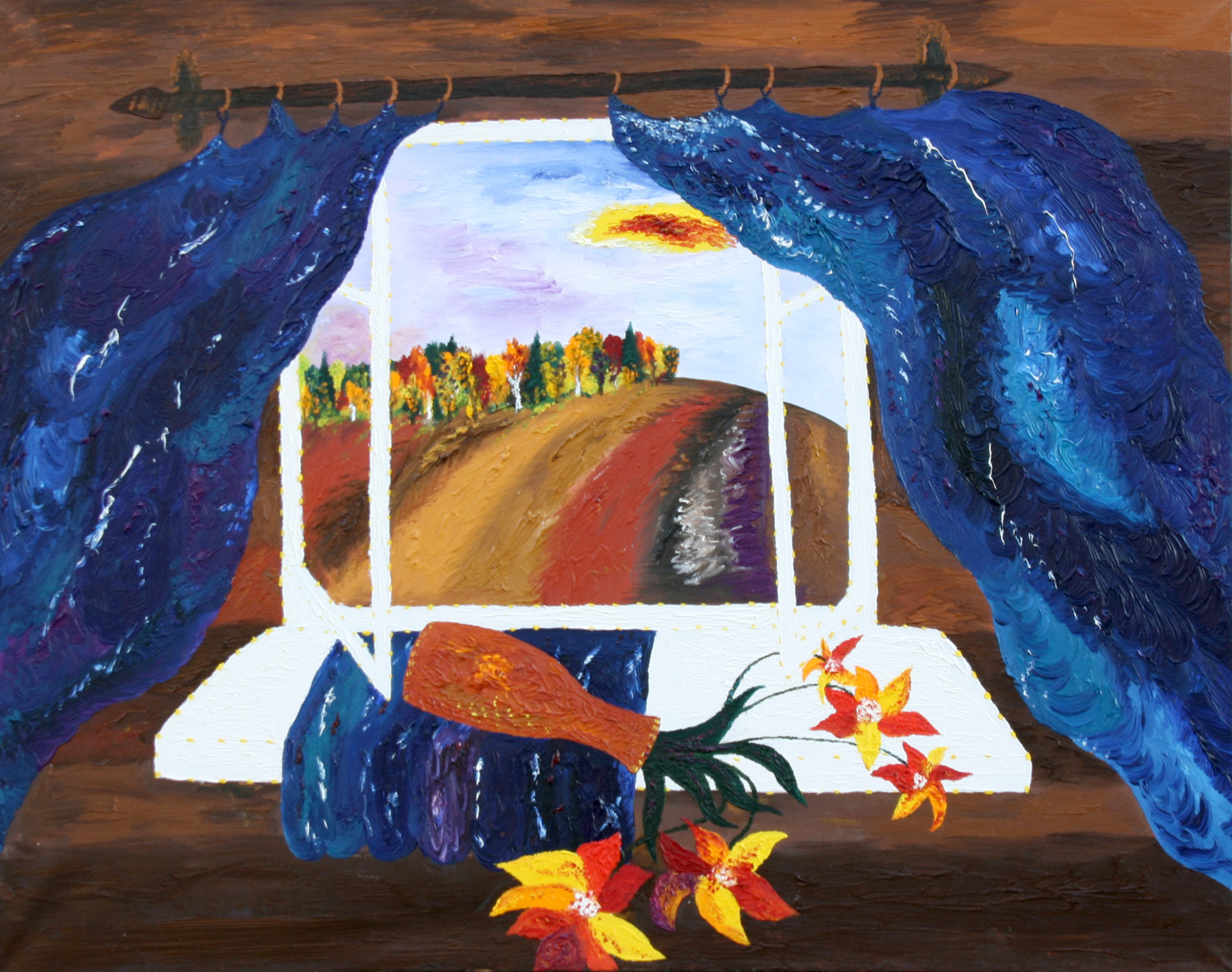
Sergey Zagraevsky. The draught that broke the still-life. 100x80 oil, canvas. 2008.

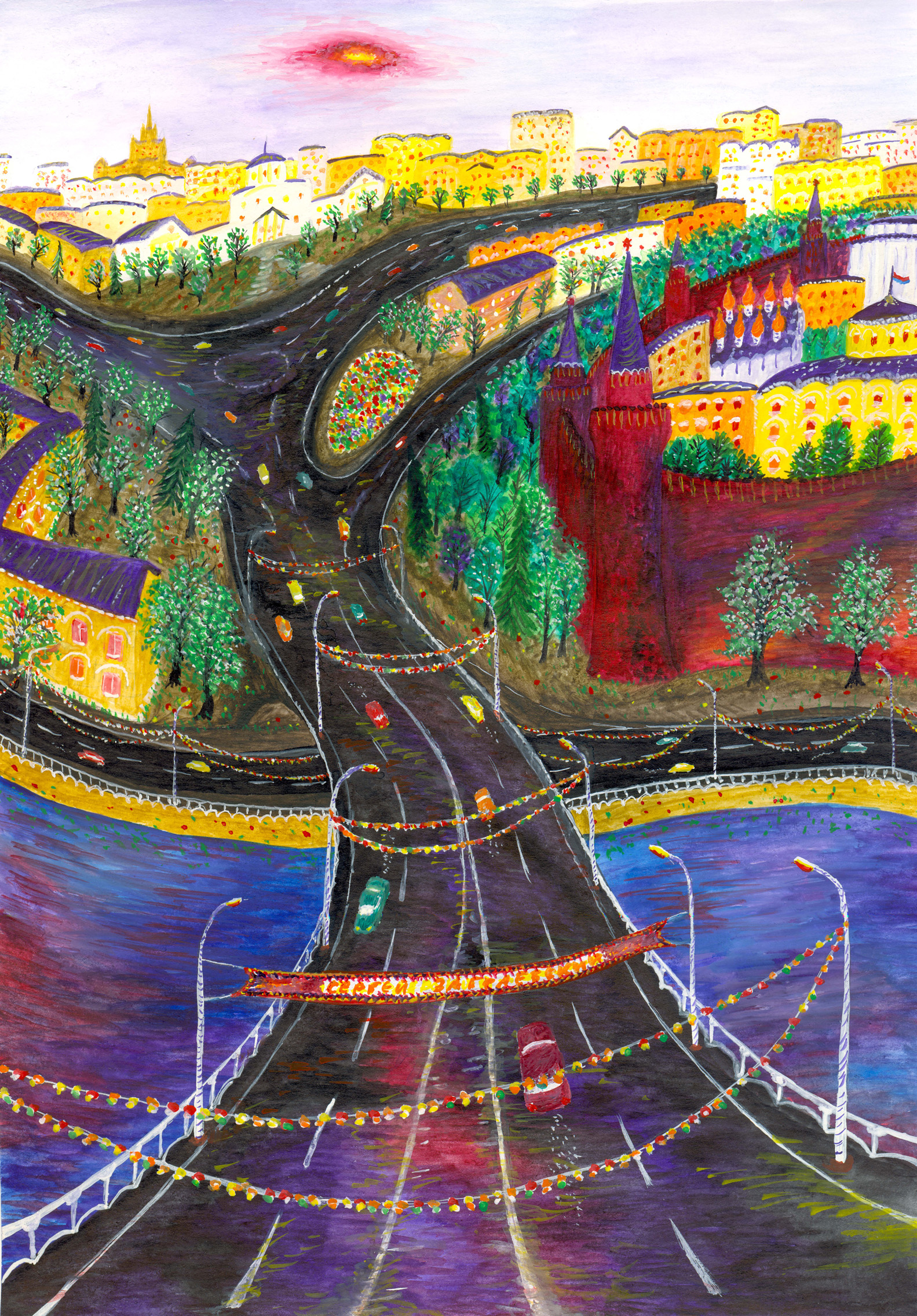
Sergey Zagraevsky. Moscow, Bolshoy Kamenny bridge. 30x21 wat.col. 2008.

== Selected books ==
=== History of architecture ===
- Jury Dolgoruky and ancient Russian white stone architecture (Russian: Юрий Долгорукий и древнерусское белокаменное зодчество. М., 2001.) ISBN 5-94025-014-9.
- Architecture of North-Eastern Russia at the end of XIII–early XIV c. (Russian: Зодчество Северо-Восточной Руси конца XIII-первой трети XIV века. M., 2003.) ISBN 5-94025-046-7.
- Early Post-Mongolian North-Eastern Russian architecture. (Russian: О раннем послемонгольском зодчестве Северо-Восточной Руси. М., 2002. ) ISBN 5-94025-032-7.
- New researches of Vladimir-Suzdal museum’s architectural monuments (Russian: Новые исследования памятников архитектуры Владимиро-Суздальского музея-заповедника. М., 2008.) ISBN 5-94025-099-8.
- New research into the architectural monuments of Alexandrov Sloboda (Russian: Новые исследования памятников архитектуры Александровской слободы. М., 2008.) ISBN 5-94025-095-5.
- Architectural history of Trifon in Naprudnoye Church and the origin of the cross-like ceiling. (Russian: Архитектурная история церкви Трифона в Напрудном и происхождение крещатого свода. M., 2008.) ISBN 5-94025-092-0.
- Georgievsky Cathedral in Juriev-Polsky. Questions of architectural history and reconstruction (Russian: Вопросы архитектурной истории и реконструкции Георгиевского собора в Юрьеве-Польском. M., 2008.) ISBN 5-94025-097-1.
- Savior Cathedral in Andronikov Cloister. Questions of architectural history and reconstruction (Russian: Вопросы архитектурной истории собора Спаса Нерукотворного Андроникова монастыря. M., 2008.) ISBN 5-94025-094-7.
- Forms of the domes of ancient Russian temples (Формы глав (купольных покрытий) древнерусских храмов. М., 2008.) ISBN 5-94025-096-3.

=== Theology ===
- Jesus of Nazareth: life and teaching (Russian: Иисус из Назарета: жизнь и учение. М., 2000) ISBN 5-94025-004-1.
- God is no murderer (Russian: Бог не убийца. М., 2002.) ISBN 5-94025-014-9.
- New Christian philosophy (Russian: Новая христианская философия. М., 2004.) ISBN 5-94025-062-9.

=== Literature ===
- Twelve months. Book for children (Russian: Двенадцать месяцев (книга для детей). М., 1998.)
- My XX century. Memoirs (Russian: Мой ХХ век (мемуары). М., 2001.) ISBN 5-94025-009-2.
- Ivanushka in the Land of tales (Russian: Иванушка в стране сказок (трилогия). М., 2005.) ISBN 5-94025-069-6.

=== Catalogues of Zagraevsky's art works ===
- Сергей Заграевский / Sergey Zagraevsky. — М., 1998.
- Сергей Заграевский / Sergey Zagraevsky. — М., 2007.
