= National Art Gallery of Namibia =

Coordinates: 22°33′42″S 17°05′08″E

- Established: 1990
- Location: Windhoek, Namibia
- Type: Art museum
- CEO: Michelle Olga van Wyk
- Website: Official website

The National Art Gallery of Namibia (NAGN) is a state-owned art gallery situated in Windhoek, the capital city of Namibia. It was founded in 1990. The goal of this institution is to preserve and encourage art in Namibia.

It displays in a permanent exhibition of Namibian, African and European Art. Exhibitions of local artists as e.g. Uli Aschenborn are also held. As of 2018 Snobia Kaputu was the chief executive officer of the gallery between 2017 and 2022. Between 2012 and 2017 Hercules Viljoen was the director.

== See also ==
- List of national galleries
