= Uli Aschenborn =

German painter

Video a: Uli Aschenborn with his changing painting Girl-Elephant (Kinetic art)

Hans Ulrich "Uli" Aschenborn (born 6 September 1947 in Johannesburg, South Africa) is a Southern African animal painter. The musea in Windhoek and Swakopmund (Namibia) have artwork of Uli as well as the National Art Gallery of Namibia.

== Work ==
The Namibian media branded Uli Aschenborn's new style Amazing Changing Art, because his new creations change – be it by themselves (video b) or because the viewer changes his position - or the painting is moved (videos a, c - i). For his chameleon-paintings, which change color and content if the angle of view is changed, he only needs sand and paint on his canvas. The changing shadow of Aschenborn's turning sculptures show metamorphoses, e.g. the aging of a boy to an old man eventually to a skeleton (video b). The images within his Morph-Cubes (video i) distort in a grotesque way while the onlooker moves. Because movement is an integral part of these art works they are Kinetic Art.

Uli's paintings are inspired by not only his roots in Namibia, but by European liveliness complemented by landscapes (video e and photo k) - also by abstract art.

The “Ensad Alumni Paris”, of the “l'Association des anciens élèves de l'École nationale supérieure des arts décoratifs” (i. e. the Alumni Association of the National School of Decorative Arts in Paris) has appointed Uli Aschenborn honorary member in 2018.

== Artwork ==
Video f: Attacking Lion, by passing this chameleon-painting its colour changes as shown, 2007, 100 x 80 cm

Video i: Morph-Cube showing a fish, which changes if the onlooker moves, 2005, 21 x 21 x 21 cm

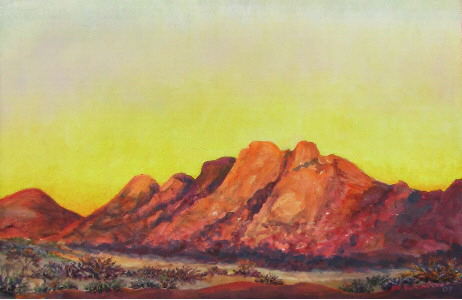
Photo k: Pontok Mountains, 2007, 100 x 150 cm

Video b: Sculpture-Morph, Male Life Cycle, 2003, 40 x 40 x 40 cm

Video e: Mountain or Crater, this drawing can be turned upside down, 21 x 29 cm
