= Tourism in Namibia =

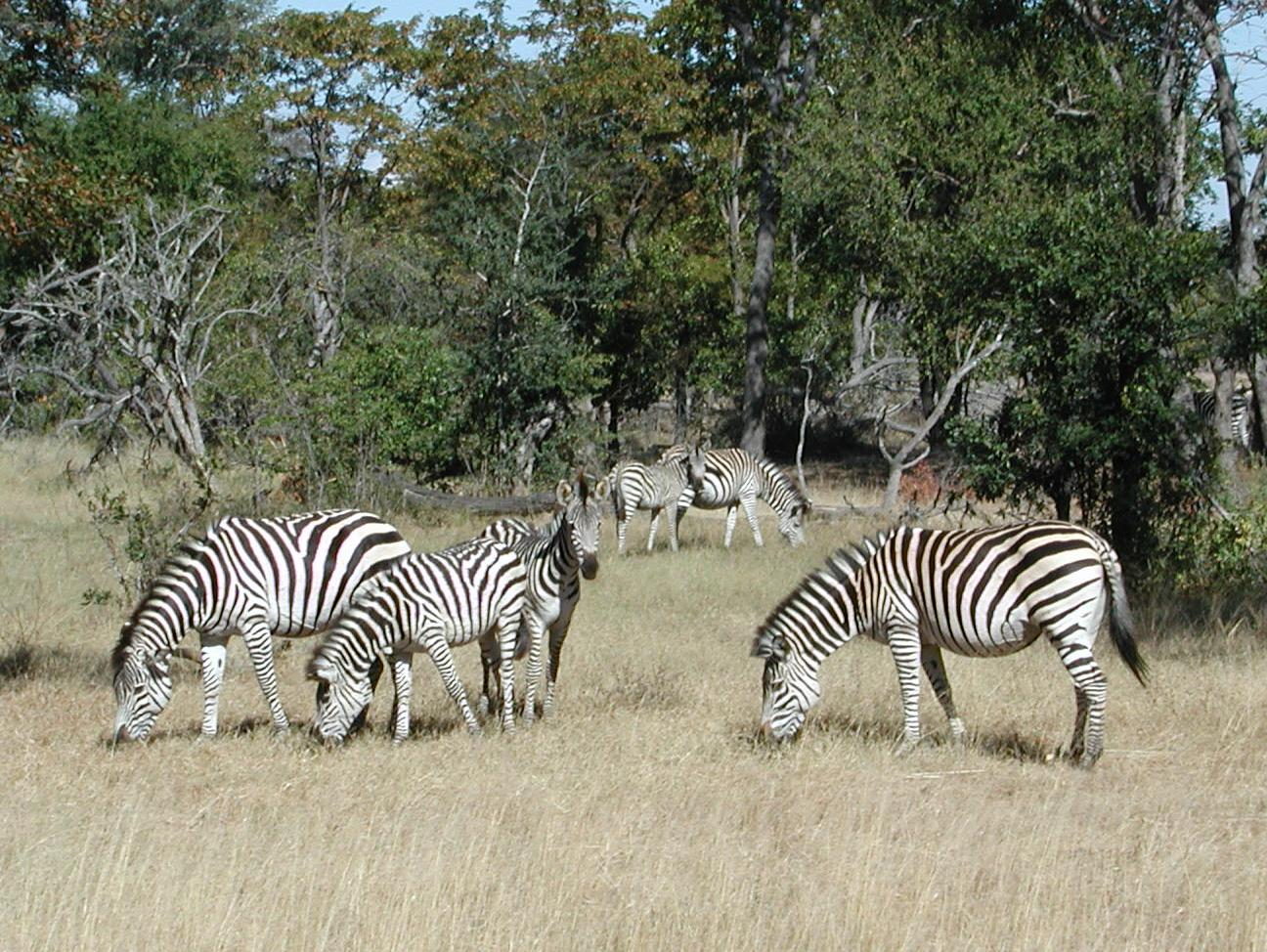
the plains zebra, an example of Namibian wildlife

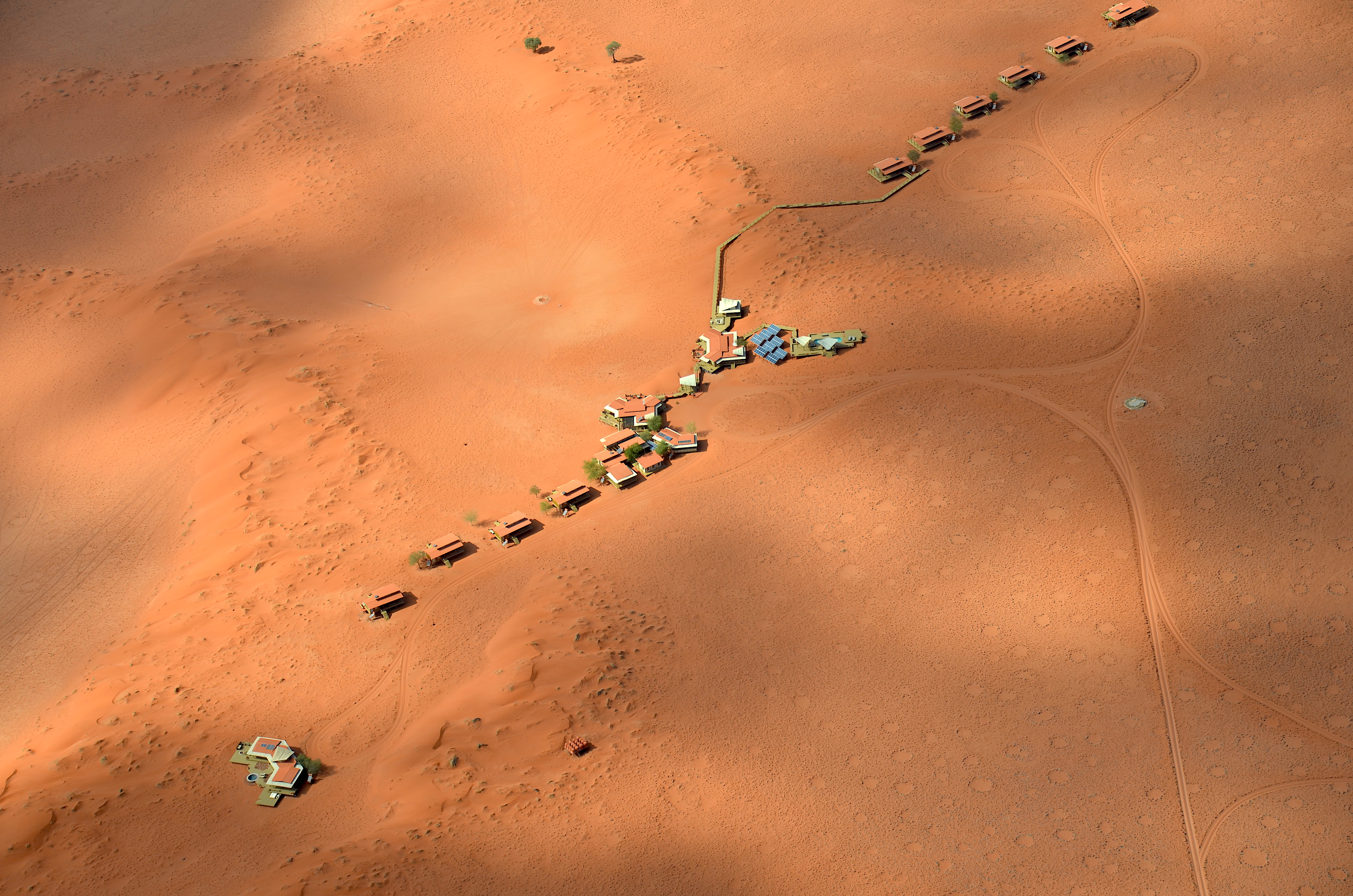
the Wolwedans Dunes Lodge, an example of lodges in the Namib (25°05′47″S 15°58′09″E

Tourism in Namibia is a major industry, contributing N$7.2 billion (equal to US$ 390 million) to the country's gross domestic product. Annually, over one million travelers visit Namibia, with roughly one in three coming from South Africa, then Germany and finally the United Kingdom, Italy and France. The country is among the prime destinations in Africa and is known for ecotourism which features Namibia's extensive wildlife.

In December 2010, Lonely Planet named Namibia 5th best tourist destination in the world in terms of value.

== History ==
The first rough estimate took place in 1989, when it was predicted that 100,000 non-domestic tourists stayed in the country. This figure has risen over time to 1,176,000 visitors in 2014.

== Employment ==
In 1996, around 600 jobs were related directly to the country's tourism sector. In 2008 it was estimated that 77,000 jobs directly or indirectly depend on Namibia's tourism, amounting to 18.2% of all formal jobs in Namibia. Tourism in Namibia also has had a positive impact on resource conservation and rural development. Some 50 communal conservancies have been established across the country, covering 11.8 million hectares of land and resulting in enhanced land management while providing tens of thousands of rural Namibians with much-needed income.

== Rankings and evaluation ==
Lonely Planet ranked Namibia fifth on a world-wide chart of value-for-money destinations in 2010. In 2020, Namibia ranked 13th out of 30 of the world’s top 30 emerging travel destinations for 2020 by TravelLemming.com. During this awards. The Etosha National Park, Fish River Canyon, Sossusvlei and the Namib-Naukluft National Park have been selected as Namibia’s top attractions.

== Tourist destinations ==
=== Windhoek ===
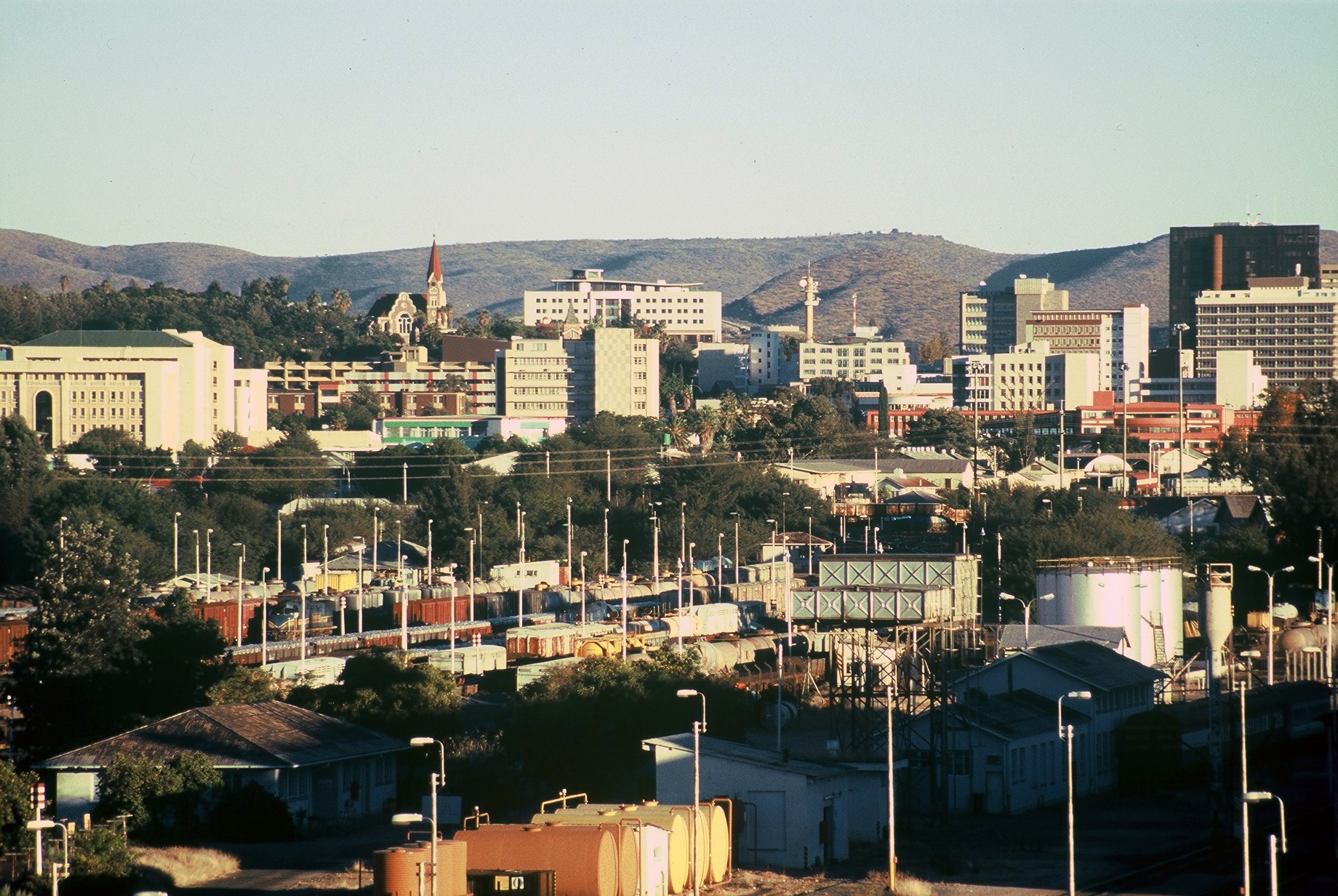
Windhoek skyline

Windhoek, the capital and biggest city, is the main entrance point for people flying into the country, usually at Windhoek Hosea Kutako International Airport. Important tourist sites in Windhoek include: the Tintenpalast, (which is the seat of both the National Council and the National Assembly), Windhoek Country Club Resort (opened in 1995 as host to the Miss Universe 1995 and is one of the premier hotels and golf tournaments in the country), Zoo Park and other places. Windhoek also has the first five star hotel in the country known as Hilton Windhoek (opened in 2011 marking Hilton's 50th hotel in the Middle East and Africa.)

=== Walvis Bay ===
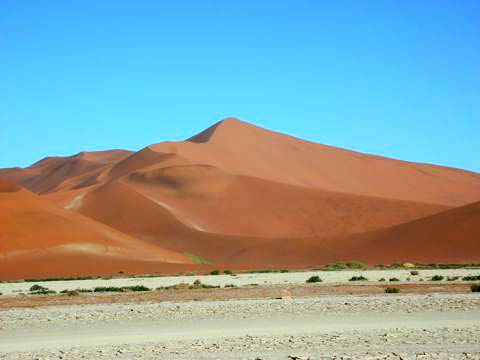
Dunes near Walvis Bay

Walvis Bay, is the second-largest town in Namibia and the country's main port. The town is served by Walvis Bay International Airport. Geographically, it is situated between the Namib Desert and a large lagoon and harbour connected to the Atlantic Ocean. These features provide opportunities for sightseeing in the area.

The lagoon and harbour is home to various species and large numbers of sea mammals and bird life. The Namib desert on the other side is called "The Living Desert", because of the large number of living species found there.

Walvis Bay is a tourist hotspot that offers a number of activities. Water-related activities include shore angling, boat angling, shark angling, sightseeing and photographic boat cruises, sea kayaking, wind- and kite surfing. Every year Walvis Bay hosts one of the international legs of speed kite and windsurfing competitions.

Land activities include Sandwich Harbour sightseeing tours, desert sightseeing tours, 4X4 dune driving tours into the majestic dunes south of the Kuiseb river, dune hang gliding, dune boarding and dune skiing, guided educational, historic and anthropologic quad biking tours into the Kuiseb Delta, visits to the Topnaar people, descendants of the Khoin-Khoin, and living desert tours.

=== Swakopmund ===
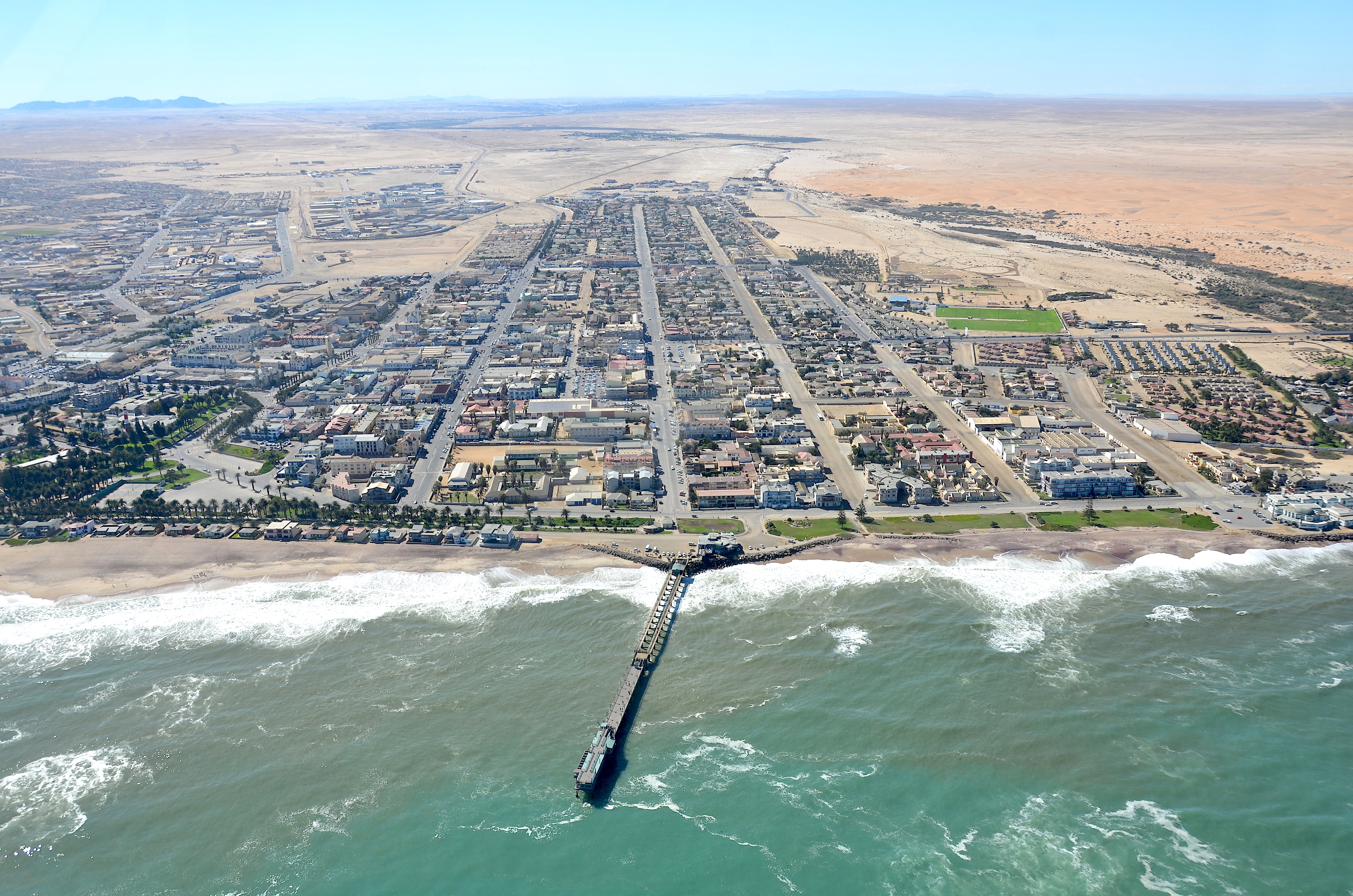
Swakopmund (2017) 22°40′51″S 014°31′17″E

Swakopmund is a beach resort and an example of German colonial architecture. It was founded in 1892 as the main harbour for German South-West Africa. Attractions include spectacular sand dunes near Langstrand south of the Swakop River. The city is known for extreme sports. Nearby is a farm that offers camel rides to tourists and the Martin Luther steam locomotive, dating from 1896 and abandoned in the desert. The city is also known for its surf culture being located close to the famous Skeleton Coast.

The Swakopmund Skydiving Club has operated from the Swakopmund Airport since 1974.

=== National Parks ===
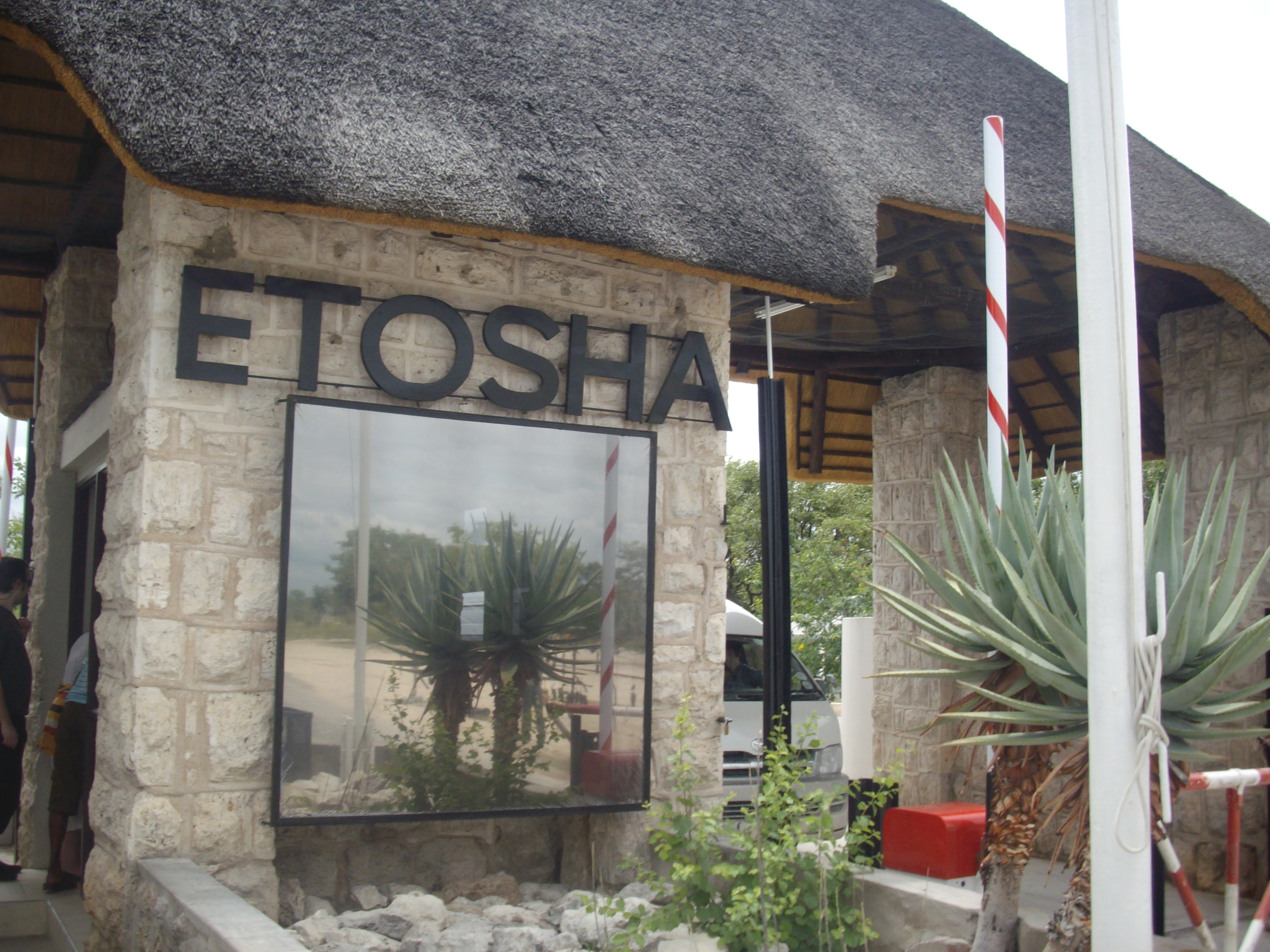
Entrance to Etosha National Park in March 2007

Namibia has many prominent National Parks, the oldest, most visited and best known is Etosha National Park. Other national parks in Namibia are:

- Namib-Naukluft
- Skeleton Coast National Park
- Ai-Ais/Richtersveld Transfrontier Park with Fish River Canyon and Ai-Ais Hot Springs
- Waterberg Plateau Park
- Bwabwata National Park
- Dorob National Park
- Khaudum National Park
- Mudumu National Park
- Mangetti National Park
- Nkasa Rupara National Park
- Tsau ǁKhaeb National Park (formerly Sperrgebiet) (Note: In November 2012, the Namibian government approved the renaming of the Sperrgebiet National Park to Tsau ǁKhaeb (Sperrgebiet) National Park. Tsau ǁKhaeb derives from the local Nama language and means "deep sandy soils".)

=== Kaokoveld ===
Koakoveld (also known as 'Kaokoland'), remains one of the country's most pristine regions. Puros Lodge and Okahirongo Elephant Lodge offer accommodation in an area regularly visited by desert elephants.

=== Extreme sports ===
Namibia's harsh climate and arid conditions make the country a top spot for different extreme sport events like desert runs and ultra-triathlons.

One such event, the 2009 250 km RacingThePlanet: Namibia ultramarathon through the Fish River Canyon, across the Namib Desert, and along the Skeleton Coast to Lüderitz had 213 runners from 38 countries start the 7-day, 6-stage race and 167 finish.

== The Namibia Tourism Board ==
The Namibia Tourism Board (NTB) was established by an Act of Parliament: the Namibia Tourism Board Act, 2000 (Act 21 of 2000). Its primary objectives are to regulate the tourism industry and to market Namibia as a tourist destination. As a statutory body, the NTB is the only legal national tourism organization or authority in Namibia mandated by Government to regulate the industry. The following sectors of business within or relating to the Namibian tourism industry are sectors that are regulated by the Namibia Tourism Board:

- Accommodation Establishments
- Activity Operators
- Air charter operators
- Booking agents
- Conference centre operators
- Foreign tour operators
- Shuttle and transport service operators
- Tour facilitators
- Tour and safari operators
- Trophy hunting operators
- Vehicle rental operators

== Trade associations ==
There are a number of trade associations that represent the tourism sector in Namibia, they include the following:

1. Namibia Travel & Tourism Forum
2. Federation of Namibia Tourism Associations (the umbrella body for all tourism associations in Namibia)
3. Hospitality Association of Namibia
4. Association of Namibian Travel Agents
5. Car Rental Association of Namibia
6. Tour and Safari Association of Namibia

== Statistics ==
Tourist arrivals of 2023 in %

Most visitors arriving in Namibia and spending at least 1 night in recent years were from the following countries of nationality:

Country	2023	2022	2017	2016	2015	2014
South Africa	349,728	116,897	325,968	342,044	351,864	312,153
Angola	112,336	82,199	403,129	398,939	447,038	470,747
Germany	79,989	62,691	123,022	122,142	90,729	86,121
Zambia	56,243	25,041	195,289	190,457	147,754	125,889
Botswana	56,157	19,761	52,021	50,665	45,049	36,724
Zimbabwe	30,460		89,241	83,287	70,940	61,187
United States	25,526	12,419	31,144	27,264	24,430	21,425
United Kingdom	18,426	12,705	33,450	31,558	25,412	25,653
France	16,002	17,503	31,758	23,484	20,189	19,577
Netherlands	14,822	9,075		20,169	13,967	11,137
Total	863,872	461,027	1,499,442	1,469,258	1,387,773	1,320,062

== See also ==
- Visa policy of Namibia
