= Namibia =

Country in Southern Africa

Republic of Namibia
(in national languages)
Afrikaans	Republiek van Namibië
German	Republik Namibia
Otjiherero	Orepublika yaNamibia
Kuanyama	Orepublika yaNamibia
Kwangali	Republika zaNamibia
Lozi	Namibia ye Lukuluhile
Khoekhoe	Republiki Namibiab dib
Tswana	Rephaboliki ya Namibia
- Flag Coat of arms
- Motto: "Unity, Liberty, Justice"
- Anthem: "Namibia, Land of the Brave"
- Capital and largest city: Windhoek; 22°34′S 17°5′E
- Official languages: English
- Recognised national languages: Afrikaans; German; Khoekhoegowab; Oshiwambo; Otjiherero; RuKwangali; Setswana; siLozi
- Recognised regional languages: ǃKung; Gciriku; Thimbukushu
- Ethnic groups (2023): 93.2% African (Note: Includes all Native African ethnic groups); 3.6% Coloured and Baster; 1.8% White; 1.4% Asian / other
- Religion (2023) (Note: Only people between 15 and 49 years of age were surveyed.): 87.9% Christianity; 43.7% Lutheranism; 22.8% Catholicism; 17.0% Anglicanism; 4.4% Other Christian; 10.5% Other; 1.6% No religion
- Demonym: Namibian
- Government: Unitary semi-presidential republic
  - President: Netumbo Nandi-Ndaitwah
  - Vice President: Lucia Witbooi
  - Prime Minister: Elijah Ngurare
  - Deputy Prime Minister: Vacant
  - Chief Justice: Peter Shivute
- Legislature: Parliament
  - Upper house: National Council
  - Lower house: National Assembly

Independence from South Africa
  - Constitution: 9 February 1990
  - Independence: 21 March 1990

Area
  - Total: 825,615 km^{2} (318,772 sq mi) (34th)
  - Water (%): Negligible

Population
  - 2025 census: ▲3,022,401 (136th)
  - Density: 3.7/km^{2} (9.6/sq mi)
- GDP (PPP): 2025 estimate
  - Total: ▲$37.73 billion (145th)
  - Per capita: ▲$12,370 (117th)
- GDP (nominal): 2025 estimate
  - Total: ▲$14.21 billion (145th)
  - Per capita: ▲$4,660 (120th)
- Gini (2015): 59.1 high inequality
- HDI (2023): ▲0.665 medium (136th)
- Currency: Namibian dollar; South African rand
- Time zone: UTC+2 (CAT)
- Date format: dd/mm/yyyy
- Calling code: +264
- ISO 3166 code: NA
- Internet TLD: .na

Namibia, (Note: /nə.ˈmɪ.bi.ə/, nə-MIH-bee-ə) officially the Republic of Namibia, is a country in Southern Africa. It borders the Atlantic Ocean to the west, Zambia (via the Caprivi Strip) and Angola to the north, Botswana to the east, and South Africa to the south; in the northeast, approximating a quadripoint, Zimbabwe lies less than 200 metres (660 ft) away along the Zambezi river near Kazungula, Zambia. Namibia's capital and largest city is Windhoek.

Namibia is the driest country in sub-Saharan Africa, and has been inhabited since prehistoric times by the Khoi, San, Damara and Nama people. Around the 14th century, immigrating Bantu peoples arrived as part of the Bantu expansion. From 1600, the Owambo formed kingdoms, such as Ondonga and Oukwanyama. In 1884, the German Empire established rule over most of the territory, forming a colony known as German South West Africa. Between 1904–08, German troops waged a punitive campaign against the Herero and Nama which escalated into the first genocide of the 20th century. German rule ended during the First World War with a 1915 defeat by South African forces. In 2021, German and Namibian diplomats created a "reconciliation agreement" acknowledging atrocities from the German colonial period.

In 1920, the League of Nations mandated administration of the colony to South Africa. The National Party, elected to power in 1948 in South Africa, applied apartheid to what was then known as South West Africa. Uprisings and demands for political representation resulted in the United Nations assuming direct responsibility over the territory in 1966, but South Africa maintained de facto rule until 1973. That year the UN recognised the South West Africa People's Organisation, SWAPO, as the official representative of the Namibian people. Namibia gained independence from South Africa in March 1990, following the South African Border War. However, Walvis Bay and the Penguin Islands remained under South African control until 1994.

Namibia is a parliamentary democracy. Agriculture, tourism and the mining industry – including mining for diamonds, uranium, gold, silver and base metals – form the basis of its economy, while the manufacturing sector is comparatively small. Despite significant GDP growth since its independence, poverty and inequality remain significant. 41% of the population is affected by multidimensional poverty, and more than 400,000 people live in informal housing. Income disparity is one of the world's highest with a Gini coefficient of 59 in 2015.

With a population of 3.1 million people, Namibia is one of the most sparsely populated countries in the world. Since the end of the Cold War, it has attracted notable immigration from Germany, Angola, and Zimbabwe. Namibia is a member state of the United Nations, the Southern African Development Community, the African Union and the Commonwealth of Nations.

== History ==
=== Etymology ===
The name of the country is derived from the Namib desert, the oldest desert in the world. The word Namib itself is of Khoi origin and means "vast place". The name was chosen by Mburumba Kerina, who originally proposed "Republic of Namib". Before Namibia became independent in 1990, its territory was known first as German South-West Africa (Deutsch-Südwestafrika), and then as South West Africa, reflecting its colonial occupation by Germans and South Africans, respectively.

=== Pre-colonial period ===
"The dry lands of Namibia have been inhabited since prehistoric times by the San, Damara, and Nama. For thousands of years, the Khoisan peoples of Southern Africa maintained a nomadic life, the Khoikhoi as pastoralists and the San people as hunter-gatherers. Around the 14th century, immigrating Bantu people began to arrive during the Bantu expansion from central Africa."

From the late 18th century onward, Oorlam people from the Dutch Cape Colony crossed the Orange River and moved into the area that today is southern Namibia. Their encounters with the nomadic Nama tribes were largely peaceful. They received the missionaries accompanying the Oorlam very well, granting them the right to use waterholes and grazing against an annual payment. On their way further north, however, the Oorlam encountered clans of the OvaHerero at Windhoek, Gobabis, and Okahandja, who resisted their encroachment. The Nama-Herero War broke out in 1880, with hostilities ebbing only after the German Empire deployed troops to the contested places and cemented the status quo among the Nama, Oorlam, and Herero.

In 1878, the Cape of Good Hope, then a British colony, annexed the port of Walvis Bay and the offshore Penguin Islands; these became an integral part of the new Union of South Africa at its creation in 1910.

The first Europeans to disembark and explore the region were the Portuguese navigators Diogo Cão in 1485 and Bartolomeu Dias in 1486, but the Portuguese did not try to claim the area. Like most of the interior of Sub-Saharan Africa, Namibia was not extensively explored by Europeans until the 19th century. At that time traders and settlers came principally from Germany and Sweden. In 1870, Finnish missionaries came to the northern part of Namibia to spread the Lutheran religion among the Owambo and Kavango people. In the late 19th century, Dorsland Trekkers crossed the area on their way from the Transvaal to Angola. Some of them settled in Namibia instead of continuing their journey.

=== German rule ===
Namibia became a German colony in 1884 under Otto von Bismarck to forestall perceived British encroachment and was known as German South West Africa (Deutsch-Südwestafrika). The Palgrave Commission by the British governor in Cape Town determined that only the natural deep-water harbour of Walvis Bay was worth occupying and thus annexed it to the Cape province of British South Africa.

In 1897, a rinderpest epidemic caused massive cattle die-offs of an estimated 95% of cattle in southern and central Namibia. In response the German colonisers set up a veterinary cordon fence known as the Red Line. In 1907, this fence then broadly defined the boundaries for the first Police Zone.

From 1904 to 1907, the Herero and the Nama took up arms against ruthless German settlers. In a calculated punitive action by the German settlers, government officials ordered the extinction of the natives in the OvaHerero and Nama genocide. In what has been called the "first genocide of the 20th century", the Germans systematically killed 10,000 Nama (half the population) and approximately 65,000 Herero (about 80% of the population). Released from detention, the survivors faced a system of forced labor, deportation, and apartheid-like segregation that foreshadowed South Africa's 1948 policy. Most Africans were confined to so-called native territories, which under South African rule after 1949 were turned into "homelands" (Bantustans).

Some historians have speculated that the downfall of the Herero in Namibia was a model for the Nazis in the Holocaust. The memory of what happened under German rule has contributed to shape the ethnic identity in independent Namibia and has kept its significance in today's relations with Germany.

The German minister for development aid apologised for the Namibian genocide in 2004. However, the German government distanced itself from this apology. Only in 2021 did the German government acknowledge the genocide and agree to pay €1.1 billion over 30 years in community aid.

=== South African mandate ===
During World War I, South African troops under General Louis Botha occupied the territory and deposed the German colonial administration. The end of the war and the Treaty of Versailles resulted in South West Africa remaining a possession of South Africa, at first as a League of Nations mandate, until 1990. The mandate system was formed as a compromise between those who advocated an allied annexation of former German and Ottoman territories and a proposition put forward by those who wished to grant them to an international trusteeship until they could govern themselves. It permitted the South African government to administer South West Africa until that territory's inhabitants were prepared for political self-determination. South Africa interpreted the mandate as a veiled annexation and made no attempt to prepare South West Africa for future autonomy.

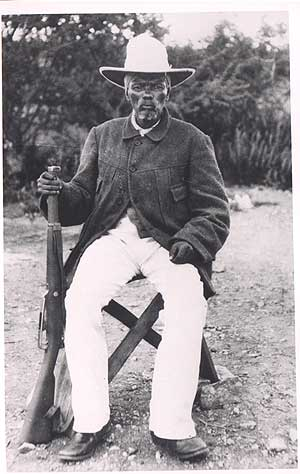
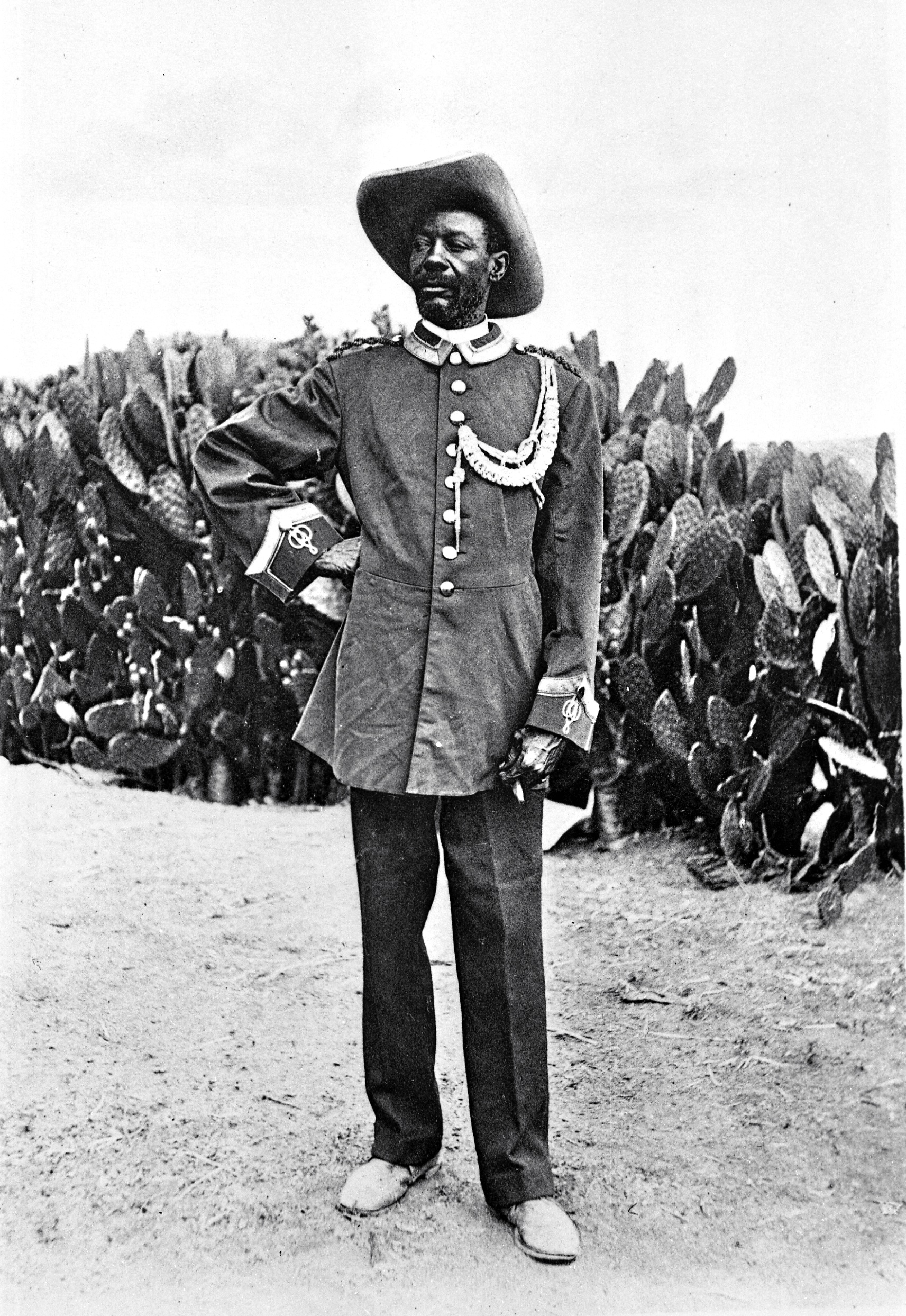
Hendrik Witbooi (left) and Samuel Maharero (right) were prominent leaders against German colonial rule.

As a result of the Conference on International Organization in 1945, the League of Nations was formally superseded by the United Nations (UN) and former League mandates by a trusteeship system. Article 77 of the United Nations Charter stated that UN trusteeship "shall apply...to territories now held under mandate"; furthermore, it would "be a matter of subsequent agreement as to which territories in the foregoing territories will be brought under the trusteeship system and under what terms". The UN requested all former League of Nations mandates be surrendered to its Trusteeship Council in anticipation of their independence. South Africa declined to do so and instead requested permission from the UN to formally annex South West Africa, for which it received considerable criticism. When the UN General Assembly rejected this proposal, South Africa dismissed its opinion and began solidifying control of the territory. The UN General Assembly and Security Council responded by referring the issue to the International Court of Justice (ICJ), which held a number of discussions on the legality of South African rule between 1949 and 1966.

South Africa began imposing apartheid, its codified system of racial segregation and discrimination, on South West Africa during the late 1940s. Black South West Africans were subject to pass laws, curfews, and a host of residential regulations that restricted their movement. Development was concentrated in the southern region of the territory adjacent to South Africa, known as the "Police Zone", where most of the major settlements and commercial economic activity were located. Outside the Police Zone, indigenous peoples were restricted to theoretically self-governing tribal homelands.

During the late 1950s and early 1960s, the accelerated decolonisation of Africa and mounting pressure on the remaining colonial powers to grant their colonies self-determination resulted in the formation of nascent nationalist parties in South West Africa. Movements such as the South West African National Union (SWANU) and the South West African People's Organisation (SWAPO) advocated for the formal termination of South Africa's mandate and independence for the territory. In 1966, following the ICJ's controversial ruling that it had no legal standing to consider the question of South African rule, SWAPO launched an armed insurgency that escalated into part of a wider regional conflict known as the South African Border War.

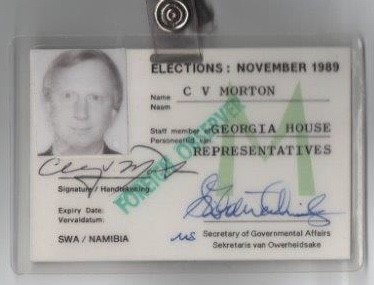
Foreign Observer identification badge issued during the 1989 Namibian election

In 1971, Namibian contract workers led a general strike against the contract system and in support of independence. Some of the striking workers would later join SWAPO's PLAN as part of the South African Border War.

=== Independence ===
As SWAPO's insurgency intensified, South Africa's case for annexation in the international community continued to decline. The UN declared that South Africa had failed in its obligations to ensure the moral and material well-being of South West Africa's indigenous inhabitants, and had thus disavowed its own mandate. On 12 June 1968, the UN General Assembly adopted a resolution proclaiming that, in accordance with the desires of its people, South West Africa be renamed Namibia. United Nations Security Council Resolution 269, adopted in August 1969, declared South Africa's continued occupation of Namibia illegal. In recognition of this landmark decision, SWAPO's armed wing was renamed the People's Liberation Army of Namibia (PLAN).

Namibia became one of several flashpoints for Cold War proxy conflicts in southern Africa during the years of the PLAN insurgency. The insurgents sought out weapons and sent recruits to the Soviet Union for military training. As the PLAN war effort gained momentum, the Soviet Union and other states such as Cuba continued to increase their support, deploying advisers to train the insurgents directly as well as supplying more weapons and ammunition. SWAPO's leadership, dependent on Soviet, Angolan, and Cuban military aid, positioned the movement firmly within the socialist bloc by 1975. This practical alliance reinforced the external perception of SWAPO as a Soviet proxy, which dominated Cold War rhetoric in South Africa and the United States. For its part, the Soviet Union supported SWAPO partly because it viewed South Africa as a regional Western ally.

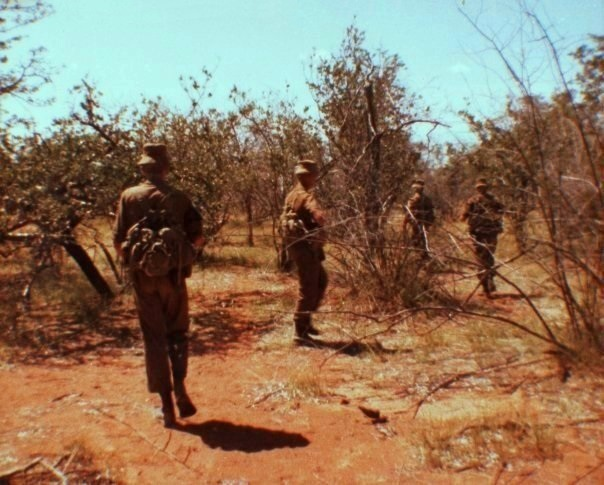
South African troops patrol the border region for PLAN insurgents, 1980s.

Growing war weariness and the reduction of tensions between the superpowers compelled South Africa, Angola, and Cuba to accede to the Tripartite Accord, under pressure from both the Soviet Union and the United States. South Africa accepted Namibian independence in exchange for Cuban military withdrawal from the region and an Angolan commitment to cease all aid to PLAN. PLAN and South Africa adopted an informal ceasefire in August 1988, and a United Nations Transition Assistance Group (UNTAG) was formed to monitor the Namibian peace process and supervise the return of refugees. The ceasefire ended after PLAN made a final incursion into the territory, possibly as a result of misunderstanding UNTAG's directives, in March 1989. A new ceasefire was later imposed with the condition that the insurgents were to be confined to their external bases in Angola until they could be disarmed and demobilised by UNTAG.

By the end of the 11-month transition period, the last South African troops had been withdrawn from Namibia, all political prisoners granted amnesty, racially discriminatory legislation repealed, and 42,000 Namibian refugees returned to their homes. Just over 97% of eligible voters participated in the country's first parliamentary elections held under a universal franchise. The United Nations plan included oversight by foreign election observers in an effort to ensure a free and fair election. SWAPO won a plurality of seats in the Constituent Assembly with 57% of the popular vote. This gave the party 41 seats, but not a two-thirds majority, which would have enabled it to draft the constitution on its own.

The Namibian Constitution was adopted in February 1990. It incorporated protection for human rights and compensation for state expropriations of private property and established an independent judiciary, legislature, and an executive presidency (the constituent assembly became the national assembly). The country officially became independent on 21 March 1990. Sam Nujoma was sworn in as the first President of Namibia at a ceremony attended by Nelson Mandela of South Africa (who had been released from prison the previous month) and representatives from 147 countries, including 20 heads of state. In 1994, shortly before the first multiracial elections in South Africa, that country ceded Walvis Bay to Namibia.

=== After independence ===
Since independence, Namibia has completed the transition from white minority apartheid rule to parliamentary democracy. Multiparty democracy was introduced and has been maintained, with local, regional and national elections held regularly. Several registered political parties are active and represented in the National Assembly, although the SWAPO has won every election since independence. The transition from the 15-year rule of President Sam Nujoma to his successor Hifikepunye Pohamba in 2005 went smoothly.

Since independence, the Namibian government has promoted a policy of national reconciliation. It issued an amnesty for those who fought on either side during the liberation war. The civil war in Angola spilled over and adversely affected Namibians living in the north of the country. In 1998, Namibia Defence Force (NDF) troops were sent to the Democratic Republic of the Congo as part of a Southern African Development Community (SADC) contingent. In 1999, the national government quashed a secessionist attempt in the northeastern Caprivi Strip. The Caprivi conflict was initiated by the Caprivi Liberation Army (CLA), a rebel group led by Mishake Muyongo. It wanted the Caprivi Strip to secede and form its own society.

In 2007, Twyfelfontein was inscribed as a cultural UNESCO World Heritage Site, a prehistoric site with one of the largest concentrations of rock engravings on the African continent. In December 2014, Prime Minister Hage Geingob, the candidate of ruling SWAPO, won the presidential elections, taking 87% of the vote. His predecessor, President Hifikepunye Pohamba, also of SWAPO, had served the maximum two terms allowed by the constitution. In December 2019, President Hage Geingob was re-elected for a second term, taking 56.3% of the vote. On 4 February 2024, President Hage Geingob died and he was immediately succeeded by vice-president Nangolo Mbumba as new President of Namibia who finished the late President's term as it came to an end in March 2025. SWAPO's first female presidential candidate, Netumbo Nandi-Ndaitwah, was declared the winner of the 2024 elections with 57% of the vote. On 21 March 2025, she was sworn in as Namibia's new president.

== Geography ==
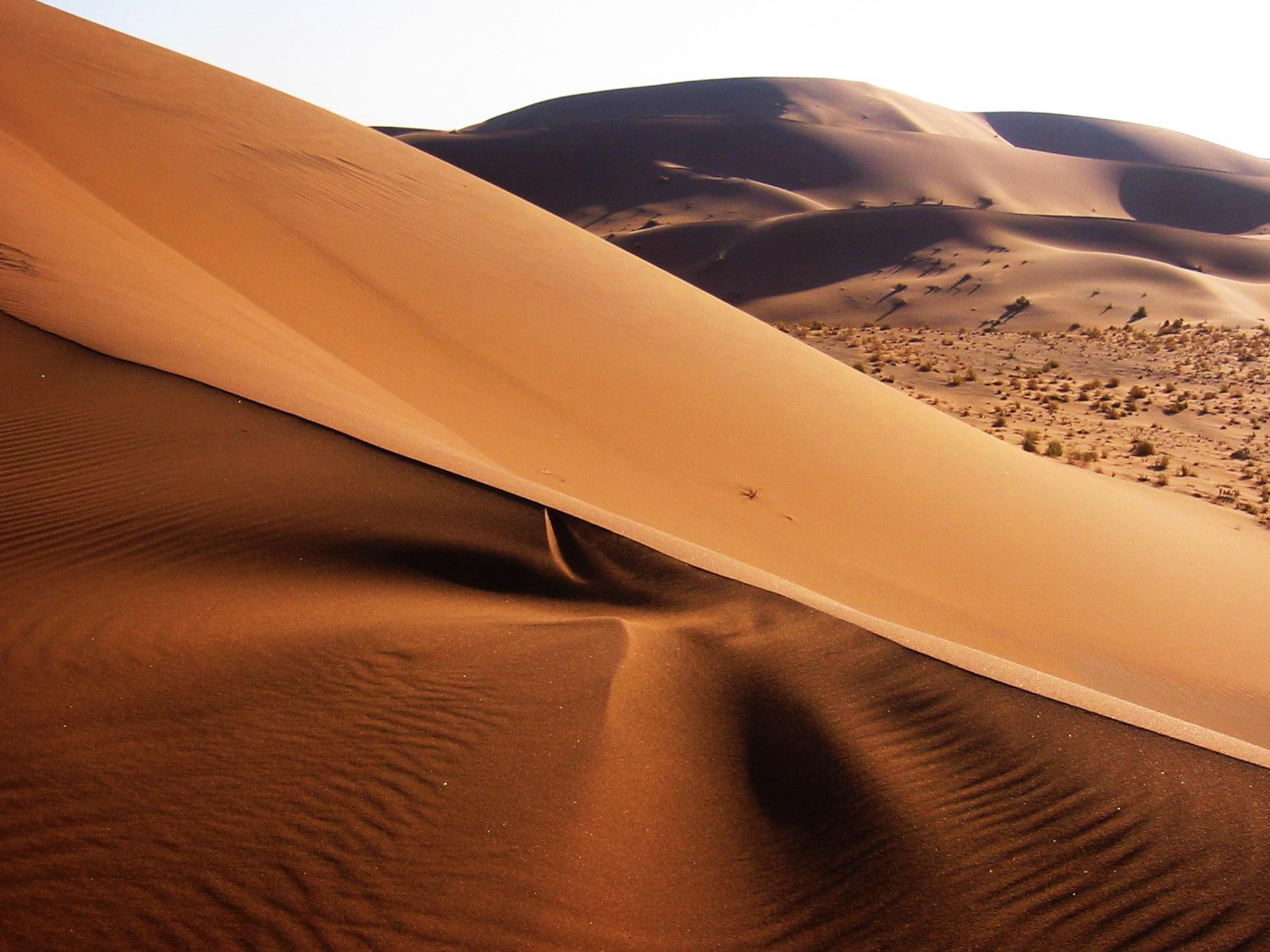
Sand dunes of the Namib desert

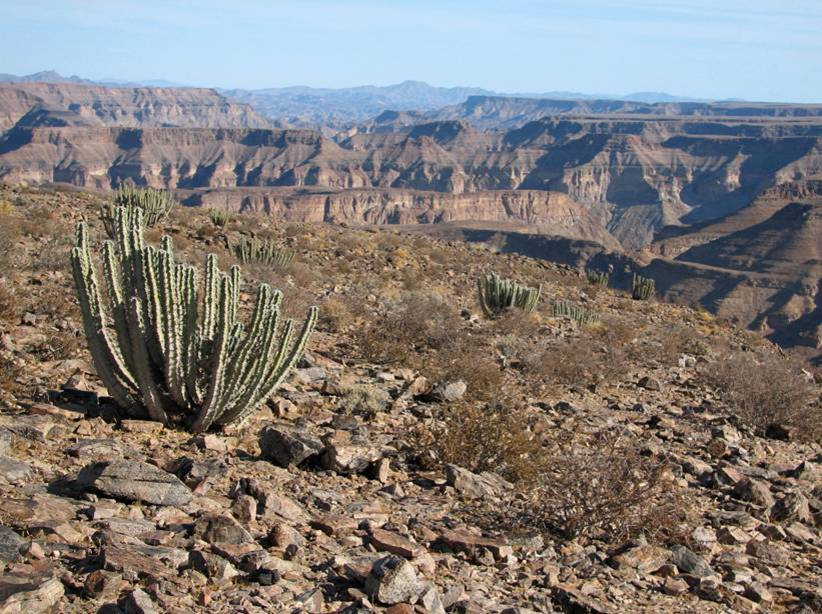
Fish River Canyon

At 825,615 km^{2} (318,772 sq mi), Namibia is the world's 34th largest country (after Venezuela). It lies mostly between latitudes 17° and 29°S (a small area is north of 17°), and longitudes 11° and 26°E.

The Namibian landscape consists generally of five geographical areas, each with characteristic abiotic conditions and vegetation, with some variation within and overlap between them: the Central Plateau, the Namib Desert, the Great Escarpment, the Bushveld, and the Kalahari Desert.

Namibia is situated between the Namib and Kalahari Deserts. Namibia has the least rainfall of any country in sub-Saharan Africa. The Namib is a broad expanse of hyper-arid gravel plains and dunes that stretches along Namibia's entire coastline. It varies between 100 and 200 km (60 and 120 mi) in width. Areas within the Namib include the Skeleton Coast and the Kaokoveld in the north and the extensive Namib Sand Sea along the central coast.

The Central Plateau runs from north to south, bordered by the Skeleton Coast (a coastal desert) to the northwest, the Namib Desert and its coastal plains to the southwest, the Orange River to the south, and the Kalahari Desert to the east. The Central Plateau is home to the highest point in Namibia at Königstein elevation 2,573 m (8,440 ft; 1.60 mi).

The Great Escarpment swiftly rises to over 2,000 m (6,600 ft). Average temperatures and temperature ranges increase further inland from the cold Atlantic waters, while the lingering coastal fogs slowly diminish. Although the area is rocky with poorly developed soils, it is significantly more productive than the Namib Desert. As summer winds are forced over the Escarpment, moisture is extracted as precipitation.

The Bushveld is found in north-eastern Namibia along the Angolan border and in the Caprivi Strip. The area receives a significantly greater amount of precipitation than the rest of the country, averaging around 400 mm (16 in) per year. The area is generally flat and the soils sandy, limiting their ability to retain water and support agriculture.

The Kalahari Desert, an arid region that extends into South Africa and Botswana, is one of Namibia's well-known geographical features. The Kalahari, while popularly known as a desert, has a variety of localised environments, including some verdant and technically non-desert areas. The Succulent Karoo is home to over 5,000 species of plants, nearly half of them endemic; approximately 10 percent of the world's succulents are found in the Karoo. The reason behind this high productivity and endemism may be the relatively stable nature of precipitation.

Namibia's Coastal Desert is one of the oldest deserts in the world. Its sand dunes, created by the strong onshore winds, are the highest in the world. Because of the location of the shoreline, at the point where the Atlantic's cold water reaches Africa's hot climate, often extremely dense fog forms along the coast. Near the coast there are areas where the dune-hummocks are vegetated. Namibia has rich coastal and marine resources that remain largely unexplored. The Caprivi Strip extends east from the northeastern corner of the country.

=== Urban settlements ===
Namibia has 13 cities, governed by municipalities and 26 towns, governed by town councils. The capital Windhoek is by far the largest urban settlement in Namibia.

Largest cities or towns in Namibia According to the 2023 Census
Rank	Name	Region	Pop.
1	Windhoek	Khomas	486,169
2	Rundu	Kavango East	118,625
3	Walvis Bay	Erongo	102,704
4	Swakopmund	Erongo	75,921
5	Oshakati	Oshana	58,696
6	Otjiwarongo	Otjozondjupa	49,022
7	Katima Mulilo	Zambezi	46,401
8	Okahandja	Otjozondjupa	45,159
9	Rehoboth	Hardap	40,788
10	Tsumeb	Oshikoto	34,960

=== Climate ===
Köppen climate types of Namibia

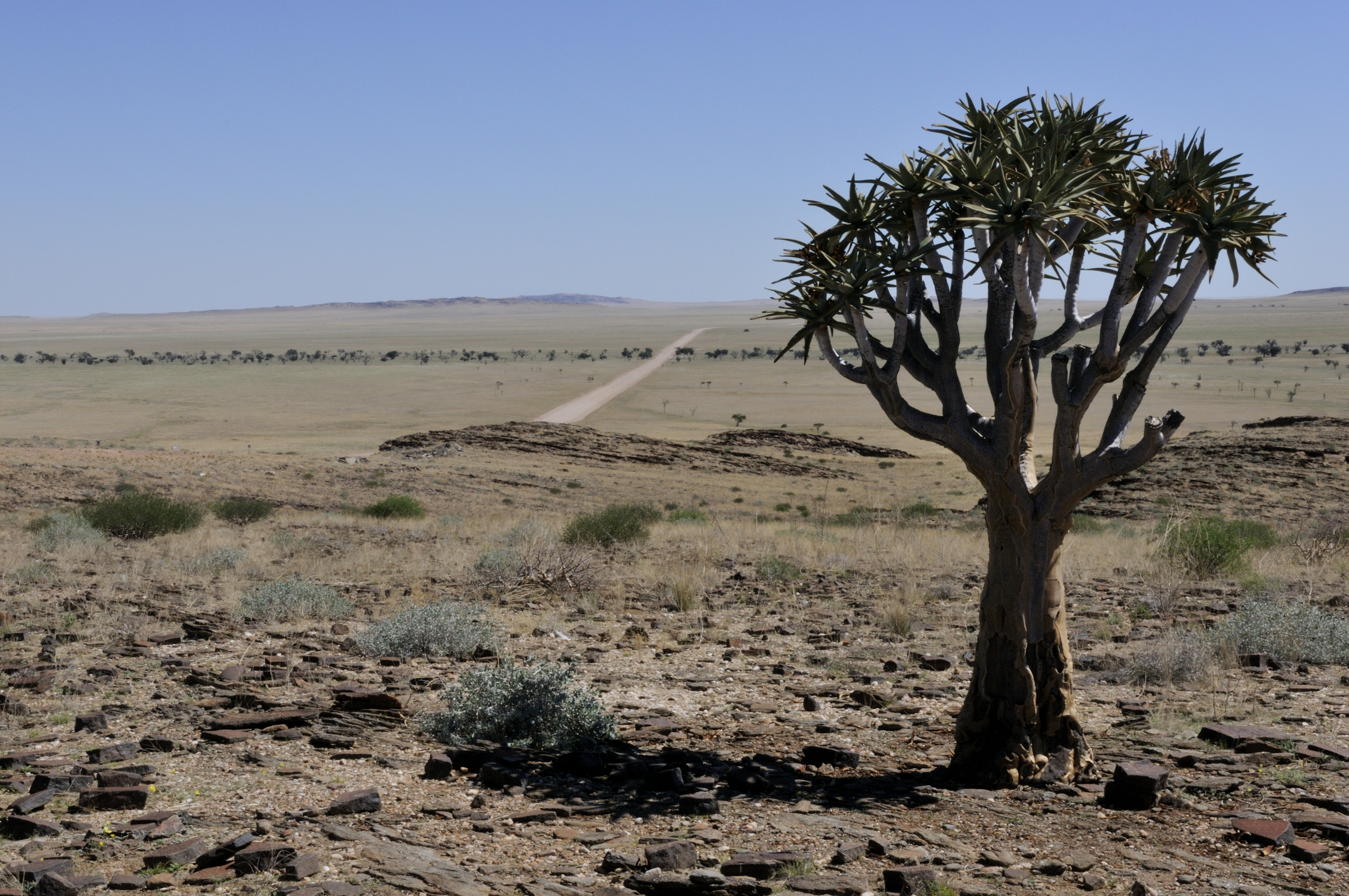
Namibia is primarily a large desert and a semi-desert plateau

Namibia extends from 17°S to 25°S latitude: climatically the range of the sub-Tropical High Pressure Belt. Its overall climate description is arid, descending from the Sub-Humid [mean rain above 500 mm (20 in)] through Semi-Arid [between 300 and 500 mm (12 and 20 in)] (embracing most of the waterless Kalahari) and Arid [from 150 to 300 mm (5.9 to 12 in)] (these three regions are inland from the western escarpment) to the Hyper-Arid coastal plain [less than 100 mm (3.9 in)]. Temperature maxima are limited by the overall elevation of the entire region: only in the far south, Warmbad for instance, are maxima above 40 °C (104 °F) recorded.

Typically the sub-Tropical High Pressure Belt, with frequent clear skies, provides more than 300 days of sunshine per year. It is situated at the southern edge of the tropics; the Tropic of Capricorn cuts the country about in half. The winter (June–August) is generally dry. Both rainy seasons occur in summer: the small rainy season between September and November, and the big one between February and April. Humidity is low, and average rainfall varies from almost zero in the Skeleton Coast (a coastal desert) to more than 600 mm (24 in) in the Caprivi Strip. Rainfall is highly variable, and droughts are common. In the summer of 2006–07 the rainfall was recorded far below the annual average. In May 2019, Namibia declared a state of emergency in response to the drought, and extended it by an additional 6 months in October 2019.

Weather and climate in the coastal area are dominated by the cold, north-flowing Benguela Current of the Atlantic Ocean, which accounts for very low precipitation (50 mm (2.0 in) per year or less), frequent dense fog, and overall lower temperatures than in the rest of the country. In Winter, occasionally a condition known as Bergwind (German for "mountain wind") or Oosweer (Afrikaans for "east weather") occurs, a hot dry wind blowing from the inland to the coast. As the area behind the coast is a desert, these winds can develop into sand storms, leaving sand deposits in the Atlantic Ocean that are visible on satellite images.

The Central Plateau and Kalahari areas have wide diurnal temperature ranges of up to 30C (54F).

Efundja, the annual seasonal flooding of the northern parts of the country, often causes not only damage to infrastructure but also loss of life. The rains that cause these floods originate in Angola, flow into Namibia's Cuvelai-Etosha Basin, and fill the oshanas (Oshiwambo: flood plains) there. The worst floods so far occurred in March 2011 and displaced 21,000 people.

=== Water sources ===
Namibia is the driest country in sub-Saharan Africa and depends largely on groundwater. With an average rainfall of about 350 mm (14 in) per annum, the highest rainfall occurs in the Caprivi Strip in the northeast (about 600 mm (24 in) per annum) and decreases in a westerly and southwesterly direction to as little as 50 mm (2.0 in) and less per annum at the coast. The only perennial rivers are found on the national borders with South Africa, Angola, Zambia, and the short border with Botswana in the Caprivi Strip. In the interior of the country, surface water is available only in the summer months when rivers are in flood after exceptional rainfalls. Otherwise, surface water is restricted to a few large storage dams retaining and damming up these seasonal floods and their run-off. Where people do not live near perennial rivers or make use of the storage dams, they are dependent on groundwater. Even isolated communities and those economic activities located far from good surface water sources, such as mining, agriculture, and tourism, can be supplied from groundwater over nearly 80% of the country.

More than 100,000 boreholes have been drilled in Namibia over the past century. One third of these boreholes have been drilled dry. An aquifer called Ohangwena II, on both sides of the Angola-Namibia border, was discovered in 2012. It has been estimated to be capable of supplying a population of 800,000 people in the North for 400 years, at the current (2018) rate of consumption. Experts estimate that Namibia has 7,720 km^{3} (1,850 cu mi) of underground water.

On 8 June 2023, Namibia became the first Southern African country and the eighth country in Africa to accede to the Convention on the Protection and Use of Transboundary Watercourses and International Lakes (UN Water Convention).

=== Communal wildlife conservancies ===
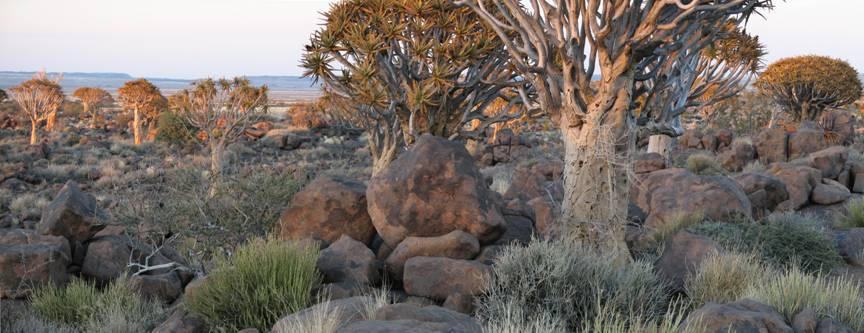
Quivertree Forest, Bushveld

Namibia is one of few countries in the world to specifically address conservation and protection of natural resources in its constitution. Article 95 states, "The State shall actively promote and maintain the welfare of the people by adopting international policies aimed at the following: maintenance of ecosystems, essential ecological processes, and biological diversity of Namibia, and utilisation of living natural resources on a sustainable basis for the benefit of all Namibians, both present and future."

In 1993, Namibia's newly formed government received funding from the United States Agency for International Development (USAID) through its Living in a Finite Environment (LIFE) Project. The Ministry of Environment and Tourism, with financial support from organisations such as USAID, Endangered Wildlife Trust, World Wide Fund for Nature, and Canadian Ambassador's Fund, together form a Community-Based Natural Resource Management (CBNRM) support structure. The project's main goal is to promote sustainable natural resource management by giving local communities rights to wildlife management and tourism.

=== Wildlife ===
Namibia has various species of wildlife including the wild dog, dik-dik and critically endangered black rhino. There are 200 terrestrial mammal species, 645 bird species and 115 fish species.

== Government and politics ==
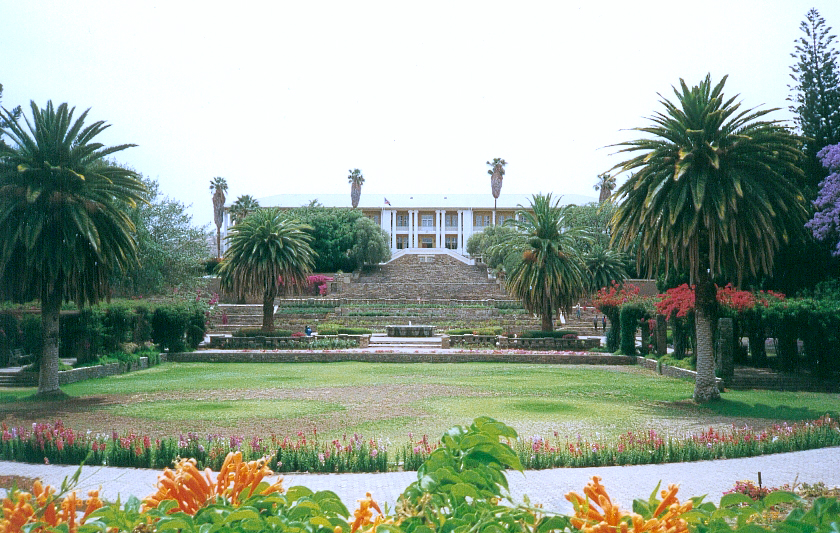
Tintenpalast, the centre of Namibia's government

Namibia is a unitary semi-presidential representative democratic republic. The President of Namibia is elected to a five-year term and is both the head of state and the head of government. All members of the government are individually and collectively responsible to the legislature. (Note: Article 41 of the Constitution of the Republic of Namibia.)

The Constitution of Namibia outlines the following as the organs of the country's government:

- Executive: executive power is exercised by the President and the Government.
- Legislature: Namibia has a bicameral Parliament with the National Assembly as lower house, and the National Council as the upper house.
- Judiciary: Namibia has a system of courts that interpret and apply the law in the name of the state.

While the constitution envisaged a multi-party system for Namibia's government, the SWAPO party has been dominant since independence in 1990. According to 2023 V-Dem Democracy indices Namibia is ranked 66th electoral democracy worldwide and 8th electoral democracy in Africa.

=== Foreign relations ===
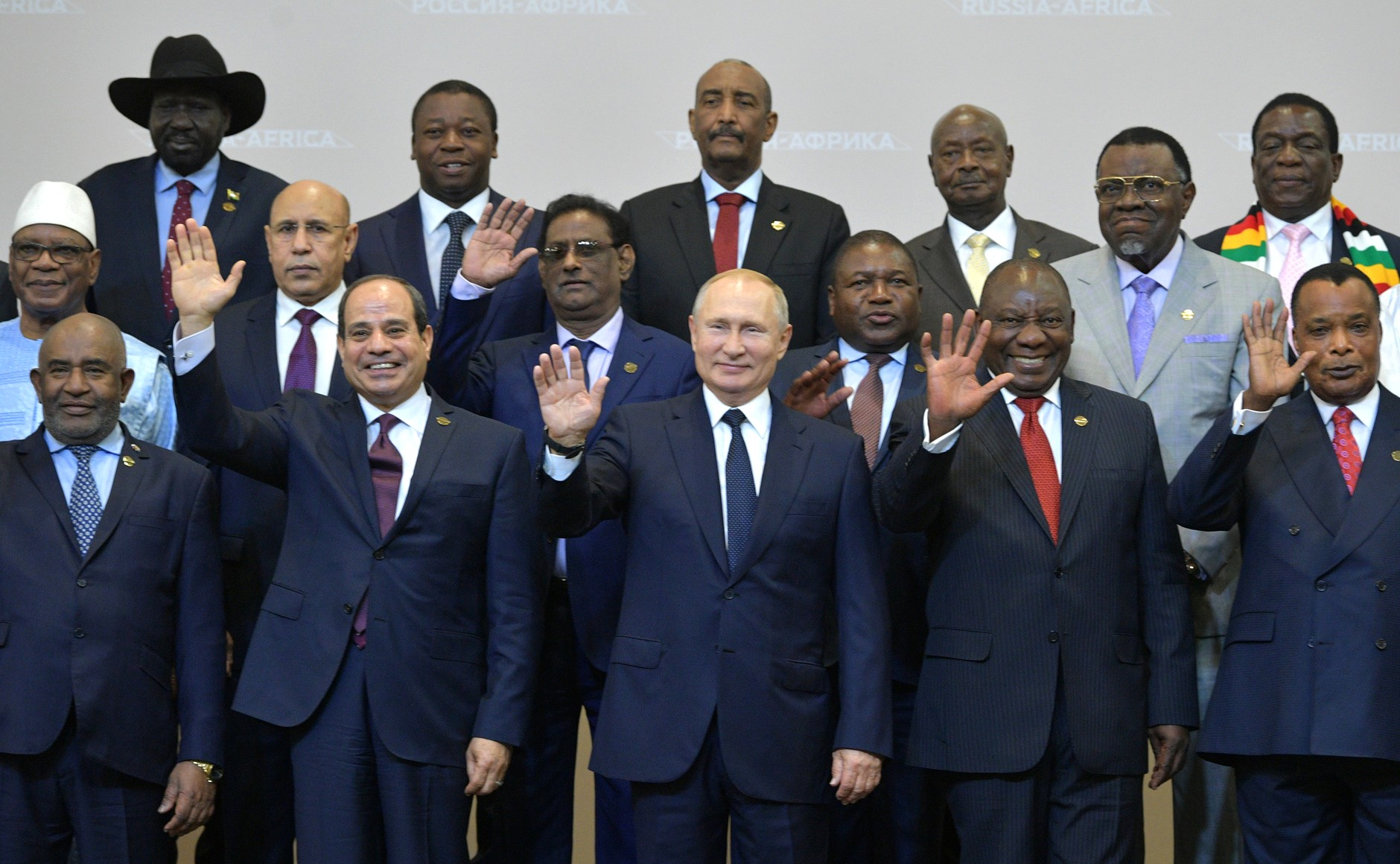
Former President Hage Geingob (second row, first from the right) with other African leaders and Russian President Vladimir Putin at the Russia–Africa Summit in Sochi, 24 October 2019

Namibia has a largely independent foreign policy, with persisting affiliations with states that aided the independence struggle, including Cuba. With a small army and a fragile economy, the Namibian government's principal foreign policy concern is developing strengthened ties within the Southern African region. A member of the Southern African Development Community, Namibia is a vocal advocate for greater regional integration. It became the 160th member of the UN on 23 April 1990. On its independence it became the 50th member of the Commonwealth of Nations.

=== Military ===
The 2019 budget for the Ministry of Defence was N$5,885 million (a 1.2% decrease from the previous financial year). With close to 6 billion Namibian dollars (US$411 million in 2021) the Ministry of Defence receives the fourth highest amount of money from government per ministry.

Namibia does not have any enemies in the region, though it has been involved in various disputes regarding borders and construction plans.

The Namibian constitution defines the role of the military as "defending the territory and national interests." Namibia formed the Namibian Defence Force (NDF), comprising former enemies in a 23-year bush war: the People's Liberation Army of Namibia (PLAN) and South West African Territorial Force (SWATF). The British government formulated the plan for integrating these forces and began training the NDF, which consists of a small headquarters and five battalions.

The United Nations Transitional Assistance Group (UNTAG)'s Kenyan infantry battalion remained in Namibia for three months after independence to help train the NDF and to stabilise the north. According to the Namibian Defence Ministry, enlistments of both men and women will number no more than 7,500.

The chief of the Namibian Defence Force is Air Vice Marshal Martin Kambulu Pinehas (with effect from 1 April 2020).

In 2017, Namibia signed the UN treaty on the Prohibition of Nuclear Weapons.

=== Administrative divisions ===
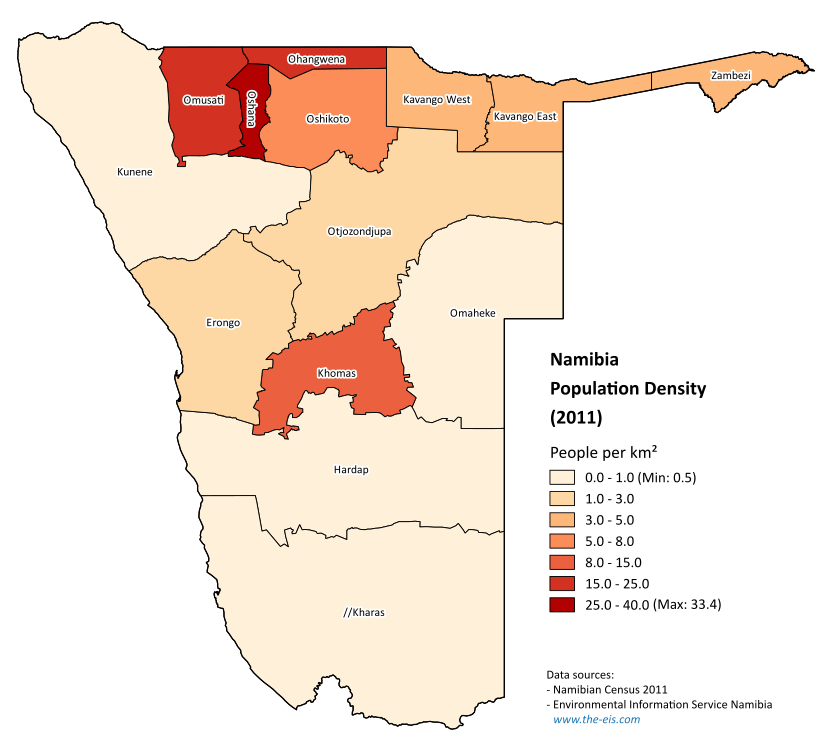
Population density in Namibia by regions (census 2011)

Namibia is divided into 14 regions which are subdivided into 121 constituencies. The administrative division of Namibia is tabled by Delimitation Commissions and accepted or declined by the National Assembly. Since state foundation four Delimitation Commissions have delivered their work, the last one in 2013 under the chairmanship of Judge Alfred Siboleka. The most urbanised and economically active regions are the Khomas and Erongo regions, with Khomas home to the capital, Windhoek, and Erongo home to Walvis Bay and Swakopmund.

The table below shows statistics from the 2023 Namibia Population and Housing Census:

Region	Population (2023)	People per km^{2}	Average household size
Khomas	494,605	13.4	3.3
Ohangwena	337,729	31.5	4.8
Omusati	316,671	11.9	4.2
Oshikoto	257,302	6.7	4.1
Erongo	240,206	3.8	3.1
Oshana	230,801	26.7	3.7
Otjozondjupa	220,811	2.1	3.6
Kavango East	218,421	9.1	5.3
Zambezi	142,373	9.7	3.7
Kavango West	123,266	5.0	5.5
Kunene	120,762	1.0	3.8
Hardap	106,680	1.0	3.6
ǁKaras	109,893	0.7	3.1
Omaheke	102,881	1.2	3.3

Regional councillors are directly elected through secret ballots (regional elections) by the inhabitants of their constituencies.

Local authorities in Namibia can be in the form of municipalities (either Part 1 or Part 2 municipalities), town councils or villages.

=== Human rights ===
Namibia is one of the most free and democratic countries in Africa, with a government that maintains and protects human rights and freedoms. Namibia was ranked first on mainland Africa in the Human Freedom Index 2025, bettered only by the three island nations of Cape Verde, Mauritius, and Seychelles. However, significant issues include government corruption, policy inertia and prison overcrowding. Also, refugees are not permitted free movement.

Homosexual acts were formerly illegal in Namibia, although the respective law was not enforced. Discrimination, as well as intolerance, against LGBT people is widespread, specifically in rural areas. Urban areas are generally neutral or supportive with a few LGBT-dedicated clubs and events. Some Namibian government officials and high-profile figures, such as Namibia's Ombudsman John Walters and First Lady Monica Geingos, had called for sodomy and homosexuality to be decriminalised and are in favour of LGBT rights. In 2023, the Supreme Court ruled that same-sex marriages legally made outside of Namibia must be recognized by the government. In 2024 the Windhoek High Court ruled the ban on homosexual acts between men to be unconstitutional. Despite these rulings, the Parliament of Namibia passed an act in October 2024 prohibiting same-sex marriages even when conducted outside Namibia, and is actively fighting to overturn the High Court's ruling and restore the ban on same-sex intimacy.

In November 2018, it was reported that 32% of women aged 15–49 experienced violence and domestic abuse from their spouses/partners and 29.5% of men believe that physical abuse towards their wife/partner is acceptable, although this is typically in rural areas. The Namibian constitution guarantees the rights, freedoms and equal treatment of women in Namibia and SWAPO, the ruling party in Namibia, has adopted a "zebra system", which ensures a fair balance of both genders in government and equal representation of women in the Namibian government.

== Economy ==
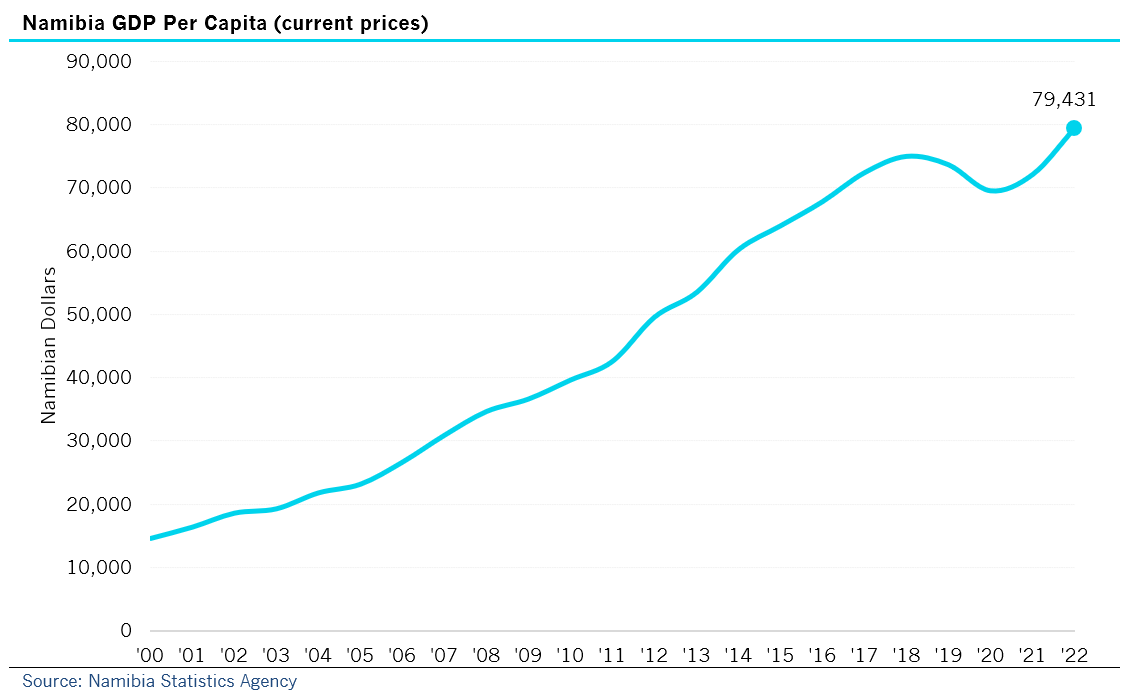
Namibia GDP per capita, 2000–2022

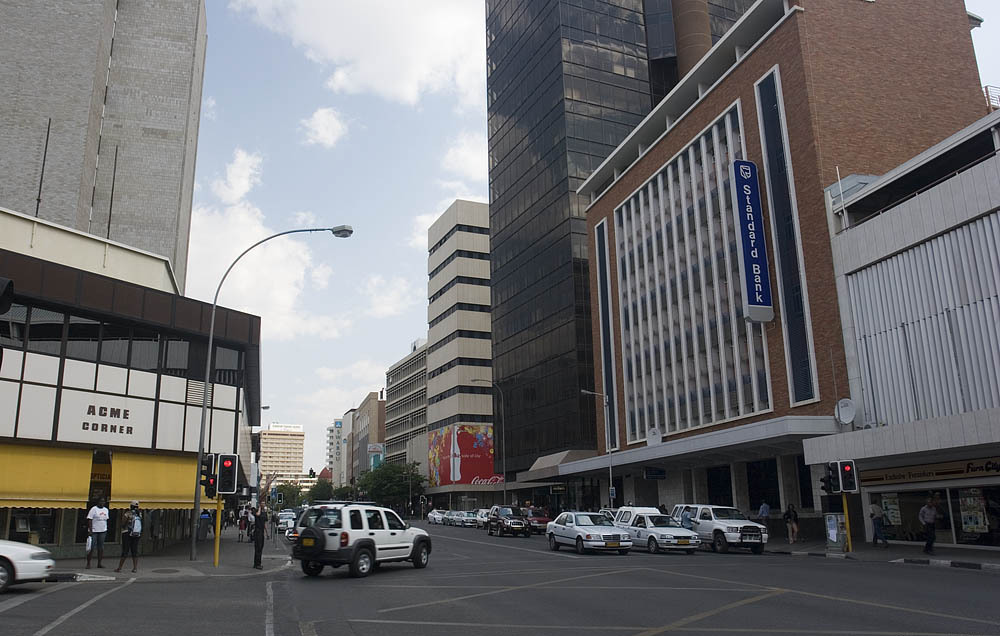
Downtown Windhoek

The trans-African automobile route – the Tripoli-Cape Town Highway and the Trans-Kalahari Corridor pass through Namibia. Namibia's economy is tied closely to South Africa's due to their shared history. In Q3 2023, the largest economic sectors were mining (18.0% of GDP), public administration (12.9%), manufacturing (10.1%), and education (9.2%).

Namibia has a highly developed banking and financial services sector with modern infrastructures, such as online banking and cellphone banking. The Bank of Namibia (BoN) is the central bank of Namibia responsible for performing all other functions ordinarily performed by a central bank. There are five BoN authorised commercial banks in Namibia: Bank Windhoek, First National Bank, Nedbank, Standard Bank and Small and Medium Enterprises Bank. Namibia's economy is characterised by a divide between the formal and the informal economies, which is in part aggravated by the legacy of apartheid spatial planning.

The country's unemployment rate was 33.4% in 2018, with a labour force of 1,090,153. As of 2023, the country has a youth unemployment rate of 38.4%, one of the highest in the world. However, Namibia has a high percentage of skilled labour relative to SADC countries and have relatively low unemployment rates for skilled workers. To fight high unemployment, particularly amongst the youth, the government approved the introduction of an Internship Tax Incentive Programme aimed at incentivising employers to enroll more interns by providing an additional corporate tax deduction. The total financial implication for the Government is estimated at N$126 million.

Poverty and inequality remain significant in the country. 40.9% of the population is affected by multidimensional poverty while an additional 19.2 percent is classified as vulnerable to multidimensional poverty. Income disparity in the country remains one of the world's highest with a Gini coefficient of 59.1 in 2015.

In 2004 a labour act was passed to protect people from job discrimination stemming from pregnancy and HIV/AIDS status. In early 2010 the Government tender board announced that "henceforth 100 per cent of all unskilled and semi-skilled labour must be sourced, without exception, from within Namibia".

In 2013, global business and financial news provider Bloomberg named Namibia the top emerging market economy in Africa and the 13th best in the world. Only four African countries made the Top 20 Emerging Markets list in the March 2013 issue of Bloomberg Markets magazine, and Namibia was rated ahead of Morocco (19th), South Africa (15th), and Zambia (14th). Worldwide, Namibia also fared better than Hungary, Brazil, and Mexico. Bloomberg Markets magazine ranked the top 20 based on more than a dozen criteria. The data came from Bloomberg's own financial-market statistics, IMF forecasts and the World Bank. The countries were also rated on areas of particular interest to foreign investors: the ease of doing business, the perceived level of corruption and economic freedom. To attract foreign investment, the government has made improvement in reducing red tape resulted from excessive government regulations, making Namibia one of the least bureaucratic places to do business in the region. Facilitation payments are occasionally demanded by customs due to cumbersome and costly customs procedures. Namibia is also classified as an Upper Middle Income country by the World Bank, and ranks 87th out of 185 economies in terms of ease of doing business.

The cost of living in Namibia is slightly above average because most goods, including cereals, need to be imported. Its capital city, Windhoek, is the 150th most expensive place in the world for expatriates to live.

Taxation in Namibia includes personal income tax, which is applicable to the total taxable income of an individual. All individuals are taxed at progressive marginal rates over a series of income brackets. Tax in Namibia is less than South African tax at monthly incomes greater than N$58,754, with the country's effective tax rates typically plateauing at a maximum of 30.8% while South Africa's plateaus at 37.4%. This makes it favourable for wealthy South Africans to migrate to Namibia given their similar cost of living, cultures and socio-economic factors. In 2024, the government announced in its FY 2024/25 Budget Statement that personal income tax would be lowered, increasing the minimum taxable income from N$50,000 to N$100,000 and reducing taxable income in higher brackets as well.

The value-added tax (VAT) is applicable to most of the commodities and services, except for staple goods such as bread.

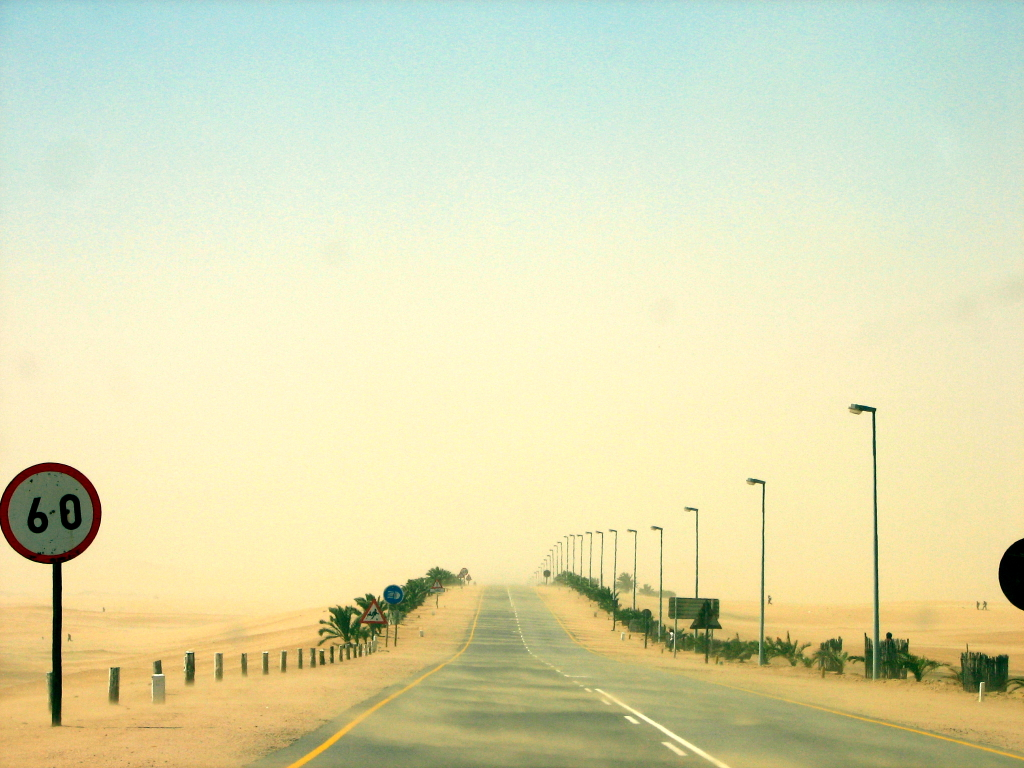
The B2 between Swakopmund and Walvis Bay, Namibia

Despite the remote nature of much of the country, Namibia has seaports, airports, highways, well-maintained roads, infrastructure and railways (narrow-gauge). It is an important regional transportation hub for its seaports and trade with landlocked neighbouring countries. The Central Plateau already serves as a transportation corridor from the more densely populated north to South Africa, the source of four-fifths of Namibia's imports.

=== Agriculture ===
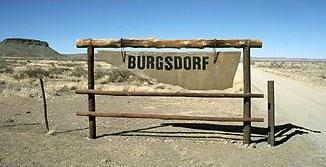
Welcoming sign of the Burgsdorf farm in Hardap

About half of the population depends on agriculture (largely subsistence agriculture) for its livelihood, but Namibia must still import some of its food. Although per capita GDP is five times the per capita GDP of Africa's poorest countries, the majority of Namibia's people live in rural areas and have a subsistence way of life. Namibia has one of the highest rates of income inequality in the world, due in part to the fact that there is an urban economy and a more rural cashless economy. The inequality figures thus take into account people who do not actually rely on the formal economy for their survival. Although arable land accounts for <1% of Namibia, (about .97%), nearly half of the population is employed in agriculture.

About 4,000 commercial farmers own almost half of Namibia's arable land. The United Kingdom offered about $180,000 in 2004 to help finance Namibia's land reform process, as Namibia plans to start expropriating land from white farmers to resettle landless black Namibians. Germany has offered €1.1bn in 2021 over 30 years in reparations for the genocides in the early 20th century but the money will go towards infrastructure, healthcare and training programmes not land reform.

An agreement has been reached on the privatisation of several more enterprises in coming years, with hopes that this will stimulate much needed foreign investment, but reinvestment of environmentally derived capital has hobbled Namibian per capita income. One of the fastest growing areas of economic development in Namibia is the growth of wildlife conservancies.

=== Mining and electricity ===
Providing 25% of Namibia's revenue, mining is the single most important contributor to the economy. Namibia is the fourth largest exporter of non-fuel minerals in Africa and was the world's fourth largest producer of uranium. There have been significant investment in uranium mining and Namibia planned to become the largest exporter of uranium by 2015. However, as of 2019 Namibia continued to produce 750 tons of uranium annually making it a smaller than average exporter in the competitive world market. Rich alluvial diamond deposits make Namibia a primary source for gem-quality diamonds. While Namibia is known predominantly for its gem diamond and uranium deposits, a number of other minerals are extracted industrially such as lead, tungsten, gold, tin, fluorspar, manganese, marble, copper and zinc. Country's gold production in 2015 was 6 metric tons. There are offshore gas deposits in the Atlantic Ocean that are planned to be extracted in the future. According to "The Diamond Investigation", a book about the global diamond market, from 1978, De Beers, the largest diamond company, bought most of the Namibian diamonds, and would continue to do so, because "whatever government eventually comes to power they will need this revenue to survive".

Although much of the world's diamond supply comes from what have been called African blood diamonds, Namibia has managed to develop a diamond mining industry largely free of the kinds of conflict, extortion, and murder that have plagued many other African nations with diamond mines. This has been attributed to political dynamics, economic institutions, grievances, political geography, and the effects of neighbourhoods, and is the result of a joint agreement between the government and De Beers that has led to a taxable base, strengthening state institutions.

Estimates updated in 2022 suggest that two exploration wells in the offshore Orange Basin could hold 2 and 3 billion barrels of oil, respectively. The expected revenue could transform Namibia's domestic economy and facilitate sustainable development goals.

Domestic supply voltage is 220 V AC. Electricity is generated mainly by thermal and hydroelectric power plants. Non-conventional methods of electricity generation also play some role. Encouraged by the rich uranium deposits, in 2010 the Namibian government planned to erect its first nuclear power station by 2018. Uranium enrichment was also envisaged to take place locally.

=== Tourism ===
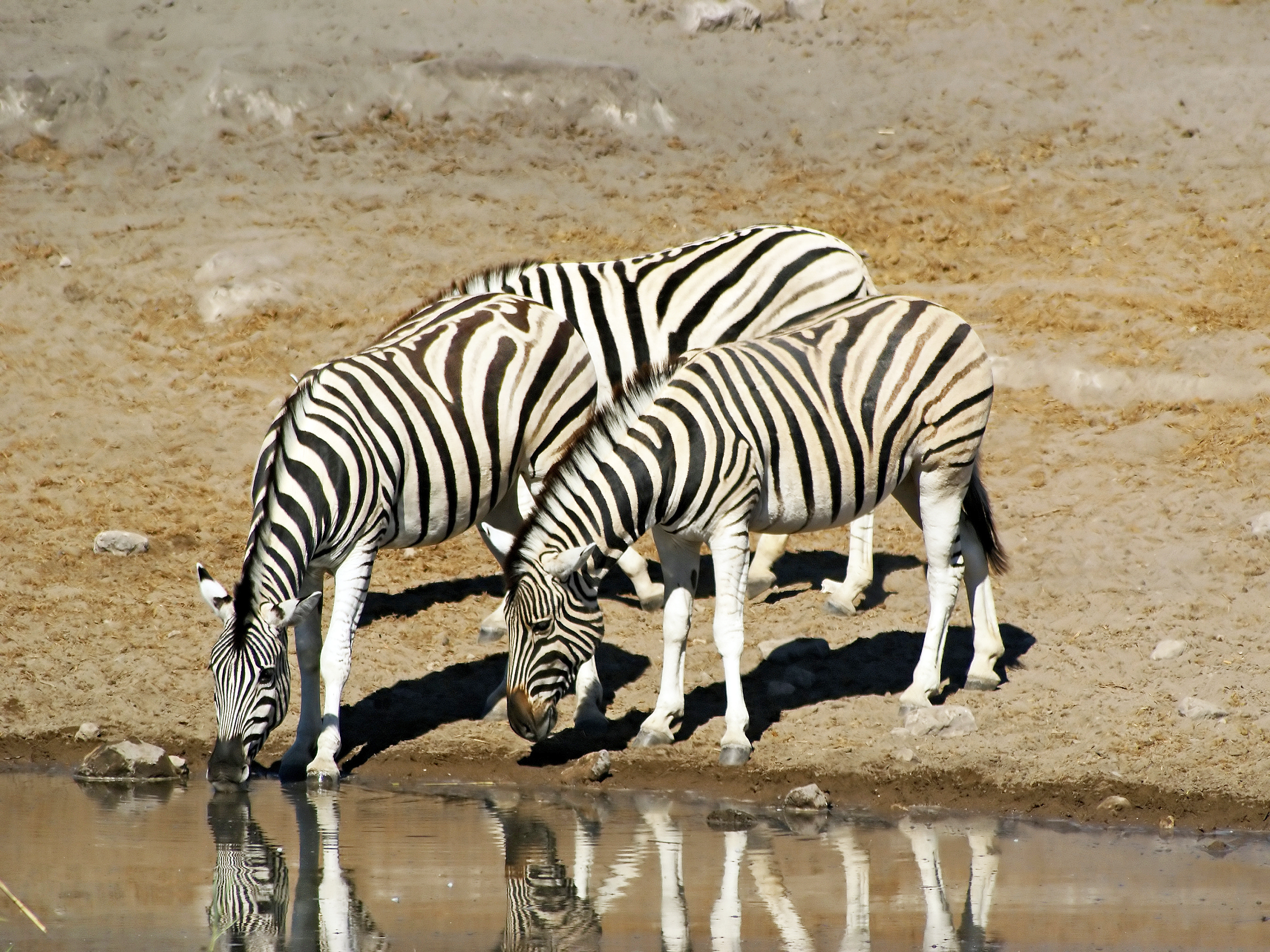
An example of Namibian wildlife, the plains zebra, is one focus of tourism.

Tourism is a major contributor (14.5%) to Namibia's GDP, creating tens of thousands of jobs (18.2% of all employment) directly or indirectly and servicing over a million tourists per year. The country is a prime destination in Africa and is known for ecotourism, which features Namibia's extensive wildlife.

There are many lodges and reserves to accommodate ecotourists. Sport and trophy hunting is also a large and growing component of the Namibian economy, accounting for 14% of total tourism in the year 2000, or 19.6 million U.S. dollars, with Namibia boasting numerous species sought after by international sport hunters.

In addition, extreme sports such as sandboarding, skydiving and 4x4ing have become popular, and many cities have companies that provide tours. The most visited places include the capital city of Windhoek, Caprivi Strip, Fish River Canyon, Sossusvlei, the Skeleton Coast Park, Sesriem, Etosha Pan and the coastal towns of Swakopmund, Walvis Bay and Lüderitz.

Windhoek plays a very important role in Namibia's tourism due to its central location and close proximity to Hosea Kutako International Airport. According to The Namibia Tourism Exit Survey, which was produced by the Millennium Challenge Corporation for the Namibian Directorate of Tourism, 56% of all tourists visiting Namibia in 2012–13 visited Windhoek. Many of Namibia's tourism related parastatals and governing bodies such as Namibia Wildlife Resorts and the Namibia Tourism Board as well as Namibia's tourism-related trade associations such as the Hospitality Association of Namibia are headquartered in Windhoek. There are also a number of notable hotels in Windhoek, such as Windhoek Country Club Resort, and some international hotel chains, such as Hilton Hotels and Resorts.

Namibia's primary tourism related governing body, the Namibia Tourism Board (NTB), was established by an Act of Parliament: the Namibia Tourism Board Act, 2000 (Act 21 of 2000). Its primary objectives are to regulate the tourism industry and to market Namibia as a tourist destination. There are also a number of trade associations that represent the tourism sector in Namibia, such as the Federation of Namibia Tourism Associations (the umbrella body for all tourism associations in Namibia), the Hospitality Association of Namibia, the Association of Namibian Travel Agents, Car Rental Association of Namibia and the Tour and Safari Association of Namibia.

=== Water supply and sanitation ===
The only bulk water supplier in Namibia is NamWater, which sells it to the respective municipalities which in turn deliver it through their reticulation networks. In rural areas, the directorate of Rural Water Supply in the Ministry of Agriculture, Water and Land Reform is in charge of drinking water supply.

The UN evaluated in 2011 that Namibia has improved its water access network significantly since independence in 1990. A large part of the population can not, however, make use of these resources due to the prohibitively high consumption cost and the long distance between residences and water points in rural areas. As a result, many Namibians prefer the traditional wells over the available water points far away.

Compared to the efforts made to improve access to safe water, Namibia is lagging behind in the provision of adequate sanitation. This includes 298 schools that have no toilet facilities. Over 50% of child deaths are related to lack of water, sanitation, or hygiene; 23% are due to diarrhea alone. The UN has identified a "sanitation crisis" in the country.

Apart from residences for upper and middle class households, sanitation is insufficient in most residential areas. Private flush toilets are too expensive for virtually all residents in townships due to their water consumption and installation cost. As a result, access to improved sanitation has not increased much since independence: in Namibia's rural areas 13% of the population had more than basic sanitation, up from 8% in 1990. Many of Namibia's inhabitants have to resort to "flying toilets", plastic bags to defecate into, which after use are flung into the bush. The use of open areas close to residential land for urination and defecation is very common and has been identified as a major health hazard.

== Demographics ==
Namibia has the second-lowest population density of any sovereign country, after Mongolia, as well as having the lowest population density of any sovereign country with a coastline. In 2017 there were on average 3.08 people per km^{2}. The total fertility rate in 2015 was 3.47 children per woman according to the UN which is lower than the average TFR in sub-Saharan Africa of 4.7.

Namibia conducts a census every ten years. After independence the first Population and Housing Census was carried out in 1991; further rounds followed in 2001, 2011, and 2023 (delayed two years due to the COVID-19 pandemic and financial constraints). The data collection method is to count every person resident in Namibia on the census reference night, wherever they happen to be. This is called the de facto method. For enumeration purposes the country is demarcated into 4,042 enumeration areas. These areas do not overlap with constituency boundaries to get reliable data for election purposes as well.

The 2011 Population and Housing Census counted 2,113,077 inhabitants. Between 2001 and 2011 the annual population growth was 1.4%, down from 2.6% in the previous ten-year period. In 2023, the Namibia Statistics Agency conducted another census, which counted 3,022,401 inhabitants.

=== Ethnic groups ===
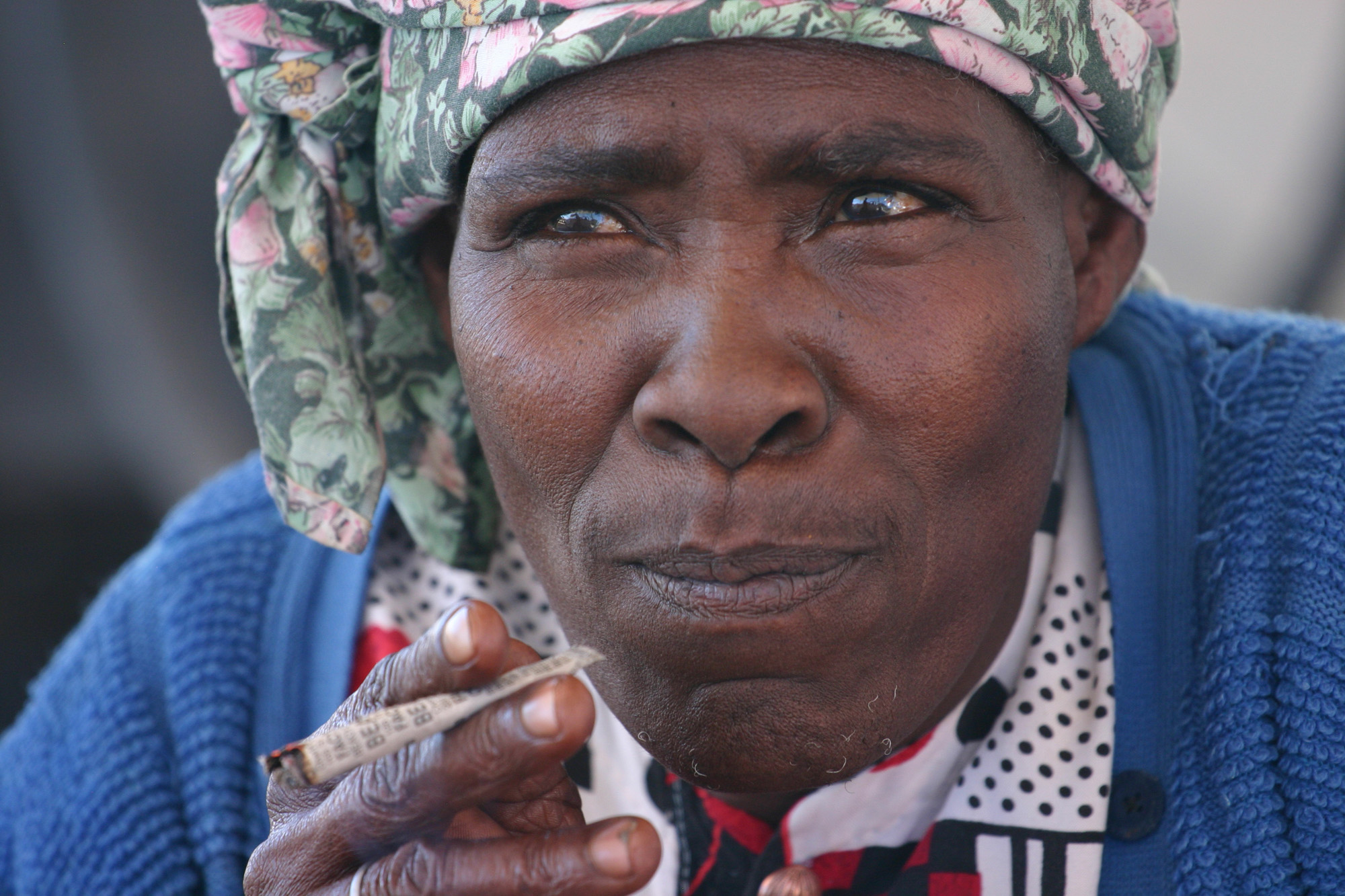
A Nama woman

Namibia has many ethnic groups. The majority of the Namibian population is made of Bantu and Khoisan peoples. The Bantu groups include the Owambo, Herero, Kavango, Lozi, Tswana and Himba peoples. The Khoisan groups encompass the Damara, Nama, and San peoples. There is also a mixed ancestry population consisting of Coloureds (2.1%) and Basters (1.5%). There is a substantial Chinese minority in Namibia; it stood at 40,000 in 2006.

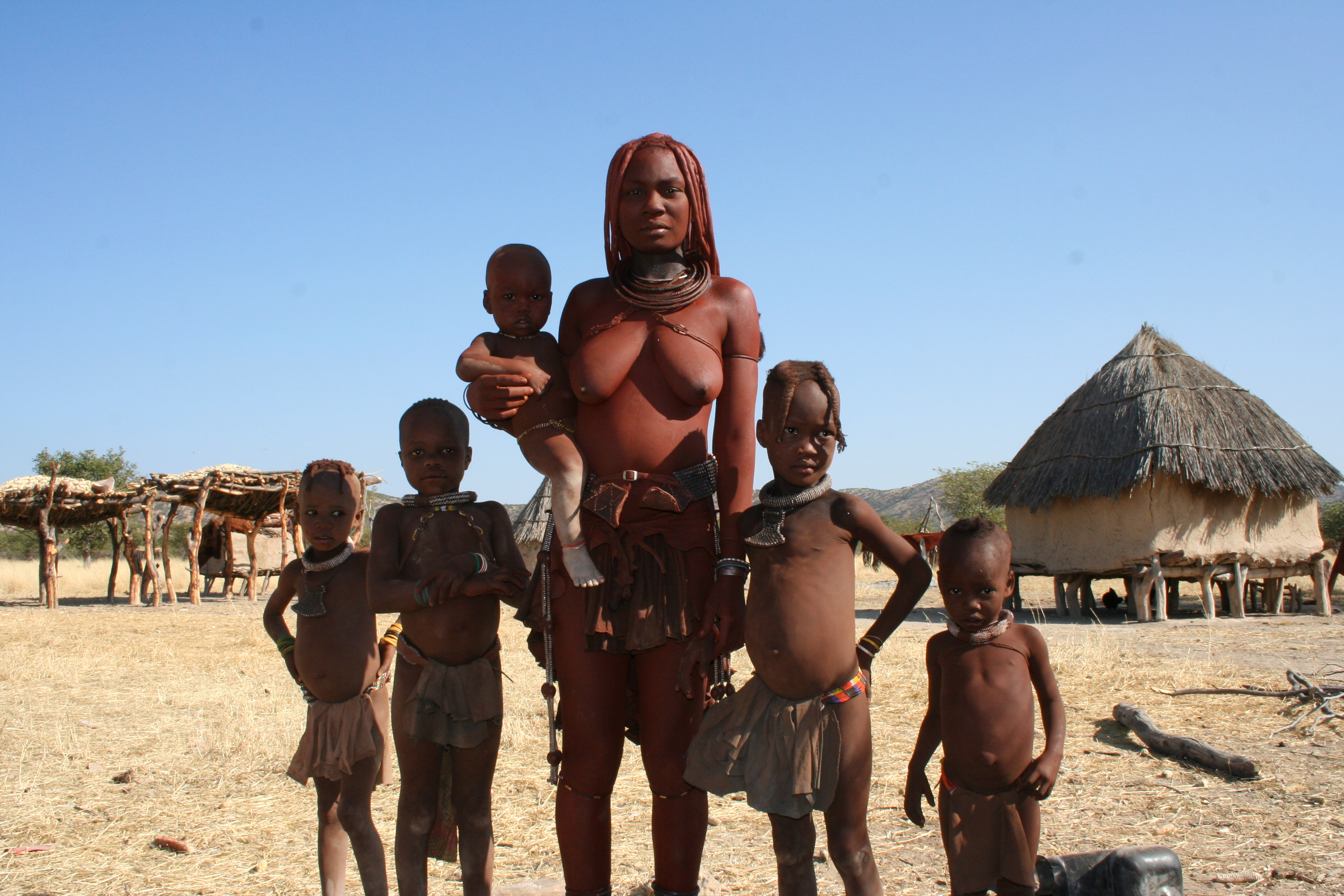
Himba people in northern Namibia

Whites (being mainly of Afrikaner, German, British and Portuguese origin) make up 1.8% of the population. Although their proportion of the population decreased after independence due to emigration and lower birth rates, they still form the second-largest population of European ancestry, both in terms of percentage and actual numbers, in Sub-Saharan Africa (after South Africa). The majority of Namibian whites and nearly all those who are of mixed race speak Afrikaans and share similar origins, culture, and religion as the white and coloured populations of South Africa. A large minority of whites (around 30,000) trace their family origins back to the German settlers who colonised Namibia prior to the South African invasion during the First World War, and they maintain German cultural and educational institutions. Nearly all Portuguese settlers came to the country from the former Portuguese colony of Angola. The 1960 census reported 526,004 persons in what was then South West Africa, including 73,464 whites (14%).

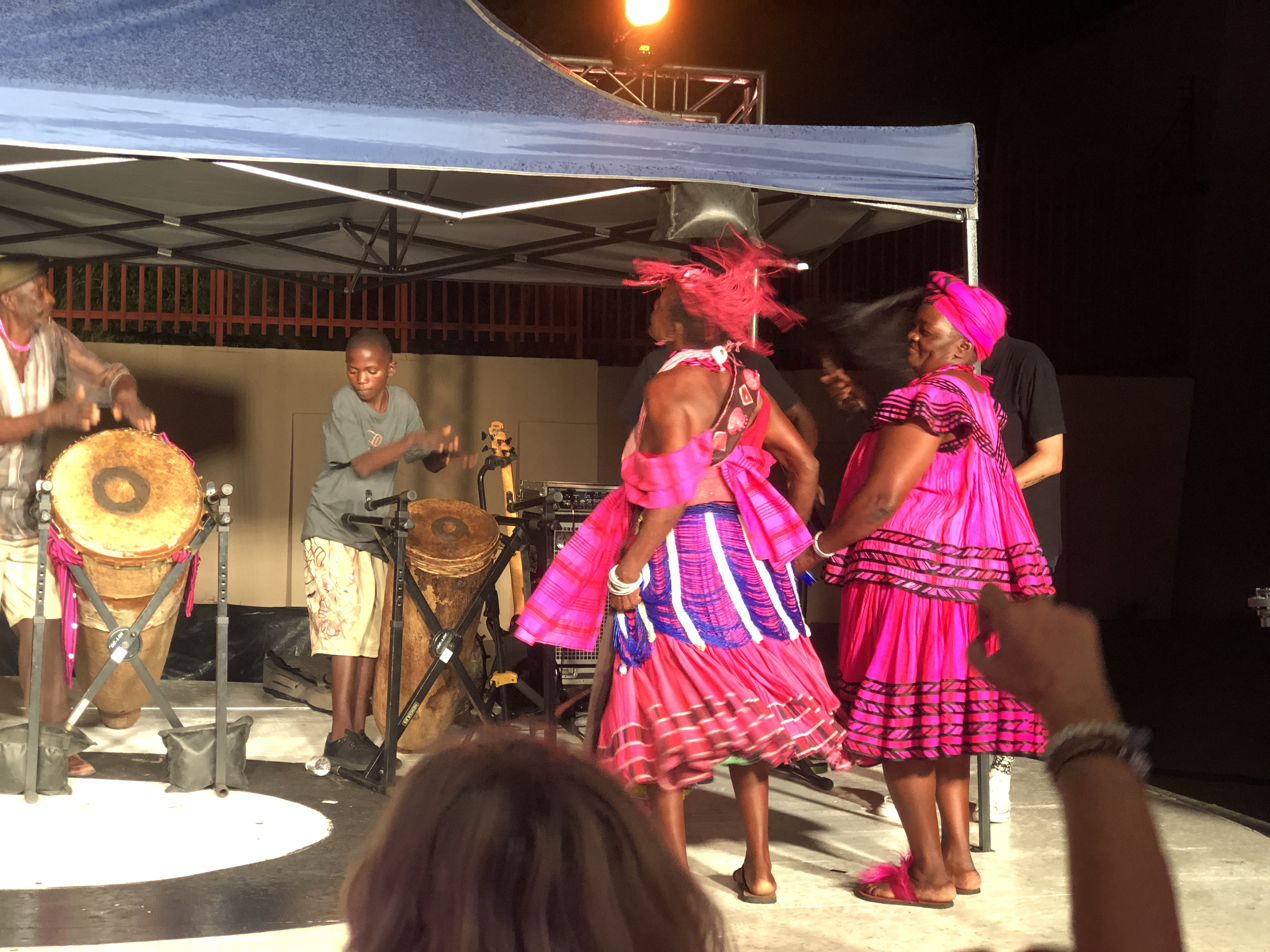
Oshiwambo women

=== Education ===
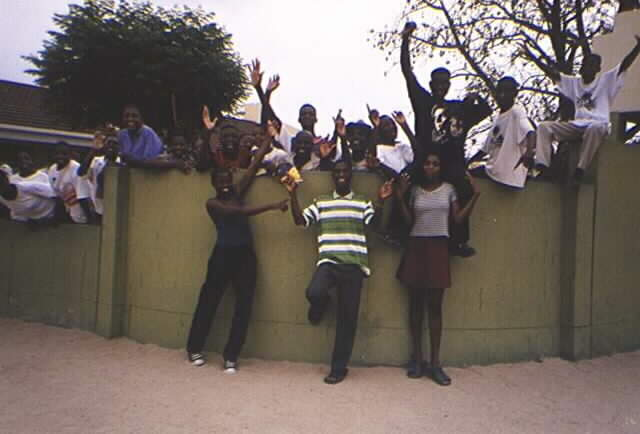
Secondary school students

Namibia has free education for both primary and secondary education levels. Grades 1–7 are primary level, grades 8–12 are secondary. In 1998, there were 400,325 Namibian students in primary school and 115,237 students in secondary schools. The pupil-teacher ratio in 1999 was estimated at 32:1, with about 8% of the GDP being spent on education. Curriculum development, educational research, and professional development of teachers is centrally organised by the National Institute for Educational Development (NIED) in Okahandja. Among sub-Saharan African countries, Namibia has one of the highest literacy rates. According to CIA World Factbook, as of 2018 91.5% of the population age 15 and over can read and write.

Most schools in Namibia are state-run, but there are some private schools, which are also part of the country's education system. There are four teacher training universities, three colleges of agriculture, a police training college, and three universities: University of Namibia (UNAM), International University of Management (IUM) and Namibia University of Science and Technology (NUST). Namibia was ranked 91st in the Global Innovation Index in 2025.

=== Religion ===
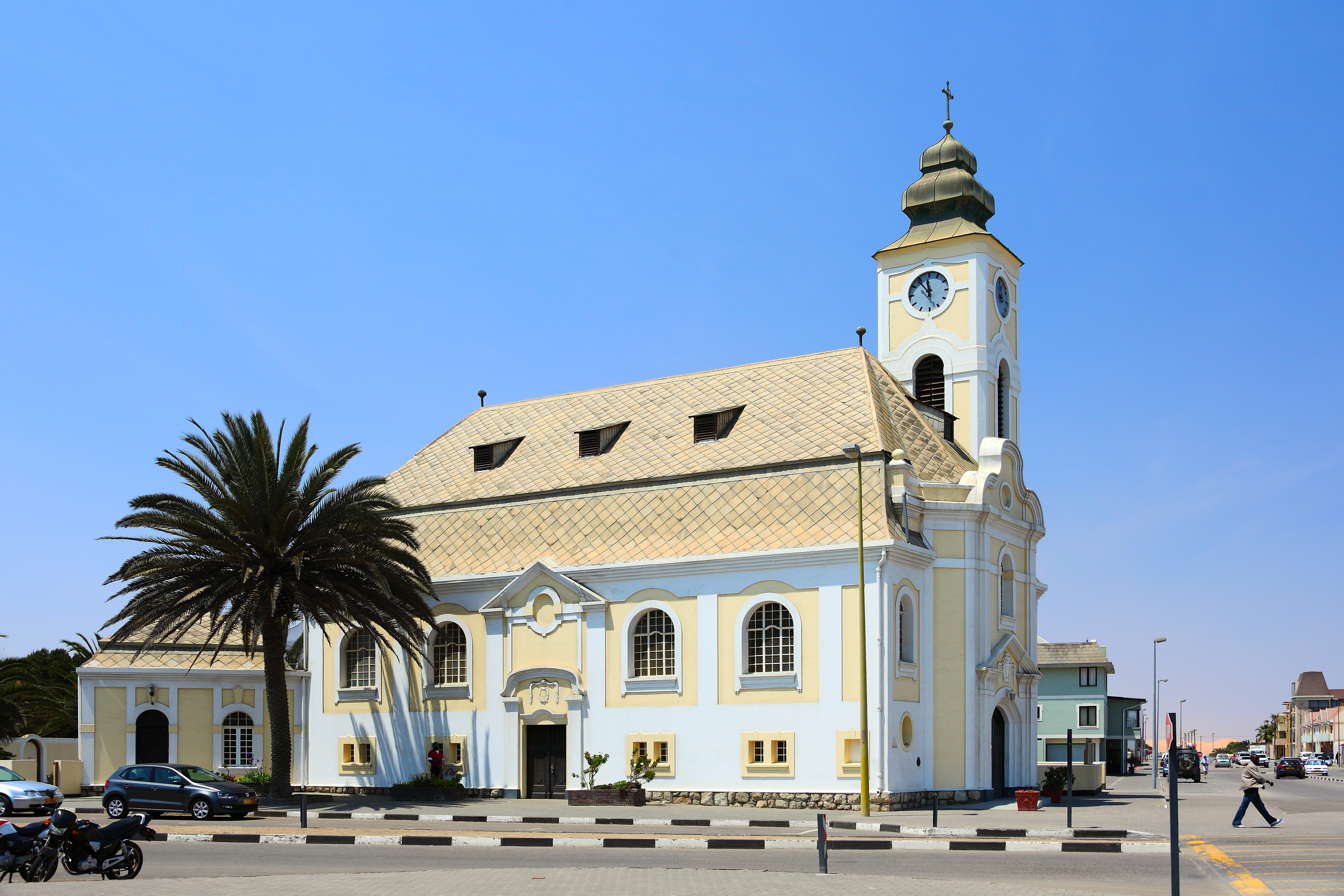
Lutheran church in Swakopmund

The Christian community makes up 80%–90% of the population of Namibia, with at least 75% being Protestant, of which at least 50% are Lutheran. Lutherans are the largest religious group, a legacy of the German and Finnish missionary work during the country's colonial times. 10%–20% of the population hold indigenous beliefs.

Missionary activities during the second half of the 19th century resulted in many Namibians converting to Christianity. Today most Christians are Lutheran, but there also are Roman Catholic, Methodist, Anglican, African Methodist Episcopal, and Dutch Reformed.

Islam in Namibia is subscribed to by about 9,000 people, many of them Nama. Namibia is home to a small Jewish community of about 100 people.

Groups such as the Latter-day Saints and Jehovah's Witnesses are also present in the country.

=== Languages ===
Home Languages in Namibia
Languages	percent
Oshiwambo Languages	49.7%
Khoekhoegowab	11.0%
Kavango Languages	10.4%
Afrikaans	9.4%
Herero Languages	9.2%
Lozi Languages	4.9%
English	2.3%
Other	1.0%
San Languages	0.7%
German	0.6%
Other African Languages	0.5%
Tswana	0.3%
Other European Languages	0.1%

The majority of Namibians can speak and understand English. Up to 1990, English, German, and Afrikaans were official languages. Long before Namibia's independence from South Africa, SWAPO was of the opinion that the country should become officially monolingual, choosing this approach in contrast to that of its neighbour South Africa (which granted all 12 of its major languages official status), which it saw as "a deliberate policy of ethnolinguistic fragmentation." Consequently, SWAPO instituted English as Namibia's sole official language, though only 2.3% of the population speaks it as a home language, but understood by most generally. Its implementation is focused on the civil service, education and the broadcasting system, especially the state broadcaster NBC. Some other languages have received semi-official recognition by being allowed as medium of instruction in primary schools. Private schools are expected to follow the same policy as state schools, and "English language" is a compulsory subject. Some critics argue that, as in other postcolonial African societies, the push for monolingual instruction and policy has resulted in a high rate of school drop-outs and of individuals whose academic competence in any language is low.

According to the latest statistical data gathered in the most recent survey (2016), the linguistic landscape in the region has witnessed notable shifts since the 2011 census. Oshiwambo remains the predominant language, claiming the position of the most spoken language for a significant 49.7% of households, surpassing its previous standing. KhoeKhoegowab follows at 11.0%, while the Kavango Languages, with a share of 10.4%, have also experienced a noteworthy increase. Afrikaans, identified with a presence at 9.4%. The Herero Languages account for 9.2%, indicating a slight adjustment from the previous census. Silozi has seen a shift to 4.9%, and English, utilized primarily as a second language, stands at 2.3%. Other Languages collectively represent 1.0%, with San Languages at 0.7%, and German at 0.6%. The diversity of languages in the region is further demonstrated by the presence of Other African Languages at 0.5%, Setswana at 0.3%, and Other European Languages at 0.1%.

Note: (1) Herero languages include: Otjiherero, Otjimbanderu, Oruzemba, Otjizimba, Otjihakahona, Otjindongona and Otjitjavikwa

(2) Kavango languages include: Rukwangali, Rushambyu, Rugciriku, Thimbukushu, Rumanyo and Rukavango

Most of the white population speaks English, Afrikaans or German. As a home language, Afrikaans is spoken by 60% of the white community, German by 32%, English by 7% and Portuguese by 4–5%. Geographical proximity to Portuguese-speaking Angola explains the relatively high number of Portuguese speakers; in 2011 these were estimated to number 100,000.

=== Health ===
Life expectancy at birth is estimated to be 64 years in 2017 – among the lowest in the world.

Namibia launched a National Health Extension Programme in 2012 deployment 1,800 (2015) of a total ceiling of 4,800 health extension workers trained for six months in community health activities including first aid, health promotion for disease prevention, nutritional assessment and counseling, water sanitation and hygiene practices, HIV testing and community-based antiretroviral treatment.

Namibia faces a non-communicable disease burden. The Demographic and Health Survey (2013) summarises findings on elevated blood pressure, hypertension, diabetes, and obesity:

- Among eligible respondents age 35–64, 44% of women and 45% of men have elevated blood pressure or are currently taking medicine to lower their blood pressure.
- 49% of women and 61% of men are not aware that they have elevated blood pressure.
- 43% of women and 34% of men with hypertension are taking medication for their condition.
- Only 29% of women and 20% of men with hypertension are taking medication and have their blood pressure under control.
- 6% of women and 7% of men are diabetic; that is, they have elevated fasting plasma glucose values or report that they are taking diabetes medication. An additional 7% of women and 6% of men are prediabetic.
- 67% of women and 74% of men with diabetes are taking medication to lower their blood glucose.
- Women and men with a higher-than-normal body mass index (25.0 or higher) are more likely to have elevated blood pressure and elevated fasting blood glucose.

Estimated percentage of HIV among young adults (15–49) per country as of 2011: 15–50 % 5-15 % 1-5 % 0.5–1 % 0.1–0.5 % Less than 0.1 % No data

The HIV epidemic remains a public health issue in Namibia despite significant achievements made by the Ministry of Health and Social Services to expand HIV treatment services. In 2001, there were an estimated 210,000 people living with HIV/AIDS, and the estimated death toll in 2003 was 16,000. According to the 2011 UNAIDS Report, the epidemic in Namibia "appears to be leveling off." As the HIV/AIDS epidemic has reduced the working-aged population, the number of orphans has increased. It falls to the government to provide education, food, shelter and clothing for these orphans. A Demographic and Health Survey with an HIV biomarker was completed in 2013 and served as the fourth comprehensive, national-level population and health survey conducted in Namibia as part of the global Demographic and Health Surveys (DHS) programme. The DHS observed important characteristics associated to the HIV epidemic:

- Overall, 26 percent of men age 15–49 and 32 percent of those age 50–64 have been circumcised. HIV prevalence for men age 15–49 is lower among circumcised (8.0 percent) than among uncircumcised men (11.9 percent). The pattern of lower HIV prevalence among circumcised than uncircumcised men is observed across most background characteristics. For each age group, circumcised men have lower HIV prevalence than those who are not circumcised; the difference is especially pronounced for men age 35–39 and 45–49 (11.7 percentage points each). The difference in HIV prevalence between uncircumcised and circumcised men is larger among urban than rural men (5.2 percentage points versus 2.1 percentage points).
- HIV prevalence among respondents age 15–49 is 16.9 percent for women and 10.9 percent for men. HIV prevalence rates among women and men age 50–64 are similar (16.7 percent and 16.0 percent, respectively).
- HIV prevalence peaks in the 35–39 age group for both women and men (30.9 percent and 22.6 percent, respectively). It is lowest among respondents age 15–24 (2.5–6.4 percent for women and 2.0–3.4 percent for men).
- Among respondents age 15–49, HIV prevalence is highest for women and men in Zambezi (30.9 percent and 15.9 percent, respectively) and lowest for women in Omaheke (6.9 percent) and men in Ohangwena (6.6 percent).
- In 76.4 percent of the 1,007 cohabiting couples who were tested for HIV in the 2013 NDHS, both partners were HIV negative; in 10.1 percent of the couples, both partners were HIV positive; and 13.5 percent of the couples were discordant (that is, one partner was infected with HIV and the other was not).

In 2015, the Ministry of Health and Social Services and UNAIDS produced a progress report in which UNAIDS projected HIV prevalence among 15-to-49-year-olds at 13.3% [12.2–14.5%] and an estimated 210,000 [200,000–230,000] living with HIV.

The malaria problem seems to be compounded by the AIDS epidemic. Research has shown that in Namibia the risk of contracting malaria is 14.5% greater if a person is also infected with HIV. The risk of death from malaria is also raised by approximately 50% with a concurrent HIV infection. The country had only 598 physicians in 2002.

== Culture ==
Namibian culture is similar to South African culture due to their tied history and family nationalities. Few Namibians express interest in permanently settling in other countries; they prefer the safety of their homeland, have a strong national identity, and enjoy a well-supplied retail sector. Namibians are typically very social and are consistently among the highest alcohol consumption rates per capita, and ranked first in Africa for beer consumption per capita.

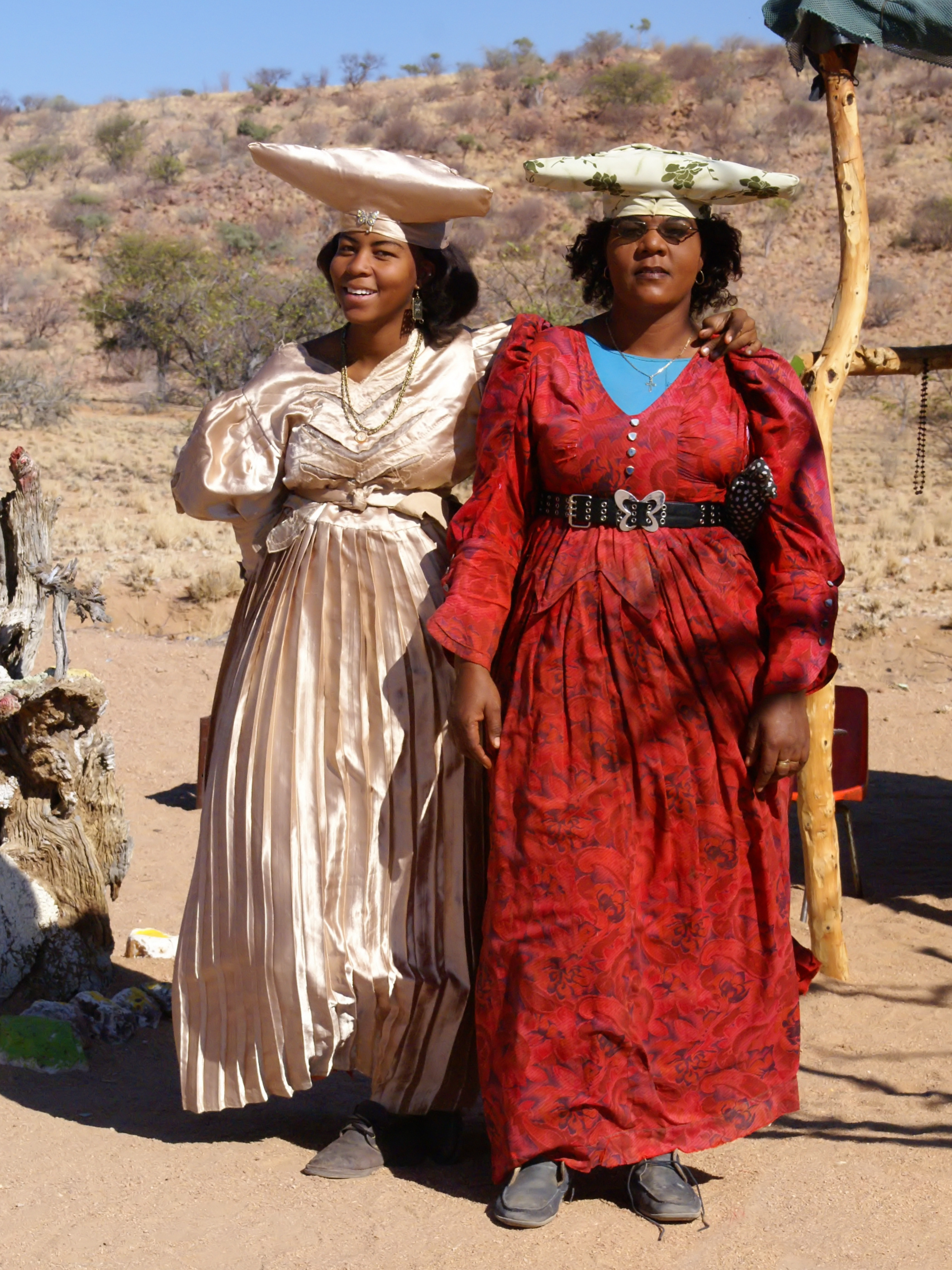
Herero Women

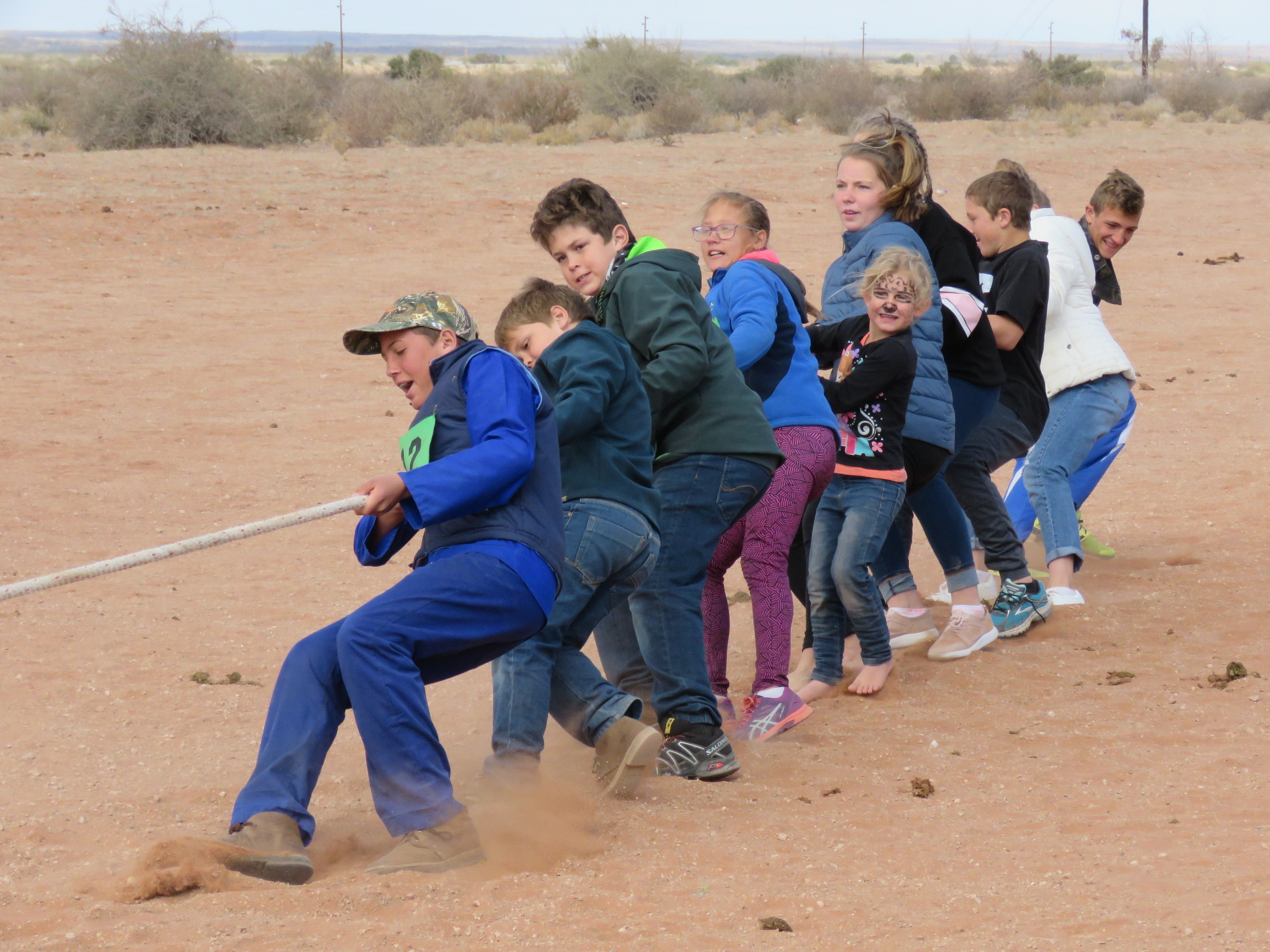
Afrikaner children in Namibia

=== Sport ===
The most popular sport in Namibia is association football. The Namibia national football team qualified for the 1998, 2008, 2019, and 2023 editions of the Africa Cup of Nations, but has yet to qualify for the World Cup. Some notable players include Derby County right-back Ryan Nyambe, Mamelodi Sundowns forward Peter Shalulile, and retired footballer Collin Benjamin.

The most successful national team is the Namibian rugby team, having competed in the last seven World Cups. Namibia were participants in the 1999, 2003, 2007, 2011, 2015, 2019, and most recent 2023 Rugby World Cup. Jacques Burger is an internationally successful Namibian rugby player.

Cricket in Namibia is also popular, with the national side having qualified for 2003 Cricket World Cup, 2021 ICC T20 World Cup and 2022 ICC Men's T20 World Cup. In December 2017, Namibia Cricket reached the final of the Cricket South Africa (CSA) Provincial One Day Challenge for the first time. In February 2018, Namibia hosted the ICC World Cricket League Division 2 with Namibia, Kenya, UAE, Nepal, Canada and Oman to compete for the final two ICC Cricket World Cup Qualifier positions in Zimbabwe. Namibia also qualified the qualifiers of ICC T20 World Cup 2021 and entered the super 12 club.

Other Namibians have achieved notable success in individual sports. Frankie Fredericks, sprinter in the 100 and 200 m track and field events, has won four Olympic silver medals (1992, 1996) and has medals from several World Athletics Championships. Golfer Trevor Dodds won the Greater Greensboro Open in 1998, one of 15 tournaments in his career. He achieved a career-high world ranking of 78th in 1998. Professional cyclist and Namibian Road Race champion Dan Craven represented Namibia at the 2016 Summer Olympics in both the road race and individual time trial. Boxer Julius Indongo was a unified WBA, IBF, and IBO world champion in the Light welterweight division.

=== Media ===
Compared to neighbouring countries, Namibia has a large degree of media freedom. Over the past years, the country usually ranked in the upper quarter of the Press Freedom Index of Reporters without Borders, reaching position 21 in 2010, being on par with Canada and the best-positioned African country. The African Media Barometer shows similarly positive results. However, as in other countries, there is still mentionable influence of representatives of state and economy on media in Namibia. In 2009, Namibia dropped to position 36 on the Press Freedom Index. In 2013, it was 19th, 22nd in 2014 and 23rd in 2019, meaning that it is currently the highest ranked African country in terms of press freedom.

Although Namibia's population is fairly small, the country has a diverse choice of media; two TV stations, 19 radio stations (without counting community stations), 5 daily newspapers, several weeklies and special publications compete for the attention of the audience. Additionally, a mentionable amount of foreign media, especially South African, is available. Online media are mostly based on print publication content. Namibia has a state-owned press agency, called NAMPA. Overall c. 300 journalists work in the country.

The first newspaper in Namibia was the German-language Windhoeker Anzeiger, founded 1898. During German rule, the newspapers mainly reflected the living reality and the view of the white German-speaking minority. The black majority was ignored or depicted as a threat. During South African rule, the white bias continued, with mentionable influence of the Pretoria government on the South West African media system. Independent newspapers were seen as a menace to the existing order, and critical journalists were often threatened.

Current daily newspapers are the private publications The Namibian (English and other languages), Die Republikein (Afrikaans), Allgemeine Zeitung (German) and Namibian Sun (English) as well as the state-owned New Era (predominantly English). Except for the largest newspaper, The Namibian, which is owned by a trust, the other mentioned private newspapers are part of Democratic Media Holdings. Other mentionable newspapers are the tabloid Informanté owned by TrustCo, the weekly Windhoek Observer, the weekly Namibia Economist, as well as the regional Namib Times. Current affairs magazines include Insight Namibia, Vision2030 Focus magazine and Prime FOCUS. The Sister Namibia magazine stands out as the longest running NGO magazine in Namibia, while Namibia Sport is the only national sport magazine. Furthermore, the print market is complemented with party publications, student newspapers and PR publications.

Radio was introduced in 1969, TV in 1981. The broadcasting sector today is dominated by the state-run Namibian Broadcasting Corporation (NBC). The public broadcaster offers a TV station as well as a "National Radio" in English and nine language services in locally spoken languages. The nine private radio stations in the country are mainly English-language channels, except for Radio Omulunga (Oshiwambo) and Kosmos 94.1 (Afrikaans). Privately held One Africa TV has competed with NBC since the 2000s.

Media and journalists in Namibia are represented by the Namibian chapter of the Media Institute of Southern Africa and the Editors' Forum of Namibia. An independent media ombudsman was appointed in 2009 to prevent a state-controlled media council.

=== Art ===
The National Art Gallery of Namibia houses a permanent exhibition of Namibian, African and European Art and shows temporary exhibitions of local artists. In 2022 Namibia took part in the Venice Biennale for the first time. It competed in the 59th Edition with the exhibition "A Bridge to the Desert" featuring "The Lone Stone Men" project by the anonymous RENN.

== See also ==
- Outline of Namibia

== Sources ==
- Vedder, Heinrich (1997). Das alte Südwestafrika. Südwestafrikas Geschichte bis zum Tode Mahareros 1890 [The old South-West Africa. South-West Africa's history until Maharero's death 1890] (in German) (7th ed.). Windhoek: Namibia Scientific Society. ISBN 978-0-949995-33-9.
- Olusoga, David; Erichsen, Casper W. (2010). The Kaiser's Holocaust: Germany's Forgotten Genocide. London, England: Farber and Farber. ISBN 978-0-571-23142-3.
- Besenyo, Molnar (2013). "UN peacekeeping in Namibia" (PDF). Tradecraft Review (2013/1. Special Issue). Budapest, Hungary: Military National Security Service: 93–109. Archived from the original (PDF) on 17 December 2014.
- Christy, S. A. (2007). Namibian Travel Photography.
- Horn, N/Bösl, A (eds.). Human rights and the rule of law in Namibia, Macmillan Namibia, 2008.
- Horn, N/Bösl, A (eds.). The independence of the judiciary in Namibia, Macmillan Namibia, 2008.
- KAS Factbook Namibia, Facts and figures about the status and development of Namibia, Ed. Konrad-Adenauer-Stiftung e.V.
- Fritz, Jean-Claude. La Namibie indépendante. Les coûts d'une décolonisation retardée, Paris: L'Harmattan, 1991.
- World Almanac. 2004. New York, NY: World Almanac Books.
