= Telephone numbers in Namibia =

- Location of Namibia in Africa
- Country: Namibia
- Continent: Africa
- Country code: +264
- International access: 00
- Long-distance: 0

Namibia's telephone numbering plan was originally devised when the country, then known as South West Africa, was under South African administration, and integrated into the South African telephone numbering plan.

Area codes beginning with 06 were allocated to Namibia, including Walvis Bay, a South African exclave, which was not transferred to Namibian sovereignty until 1994.

Following Namibia's independence in 1990, direct dialing between Namibia and South Africa was discontinued, and calls were classed as international. Consequently, subscribers were required to use the international access code and country calling code, omitting the trunk code 0. Namibia had already been allocated its own country code by the International Telecommunication Union, +264, in the late 1960s.

Windhoek, Namibia to Johannesburg, South Africa
Before 1992: 011 xxx xxxx
After 1992: 00 27 11 xxx xxxx

Johannesburg, South Africa to Windhoek, Namibia
Before 1992: 061 xxx xxx
After 1992: 09 264 61 xxx xxx
After Jan 2007: 00 26461 xxx xxx

A National Numbering Plan was deployed in 2017 to streamline the creation of telephone numbers across vendors, and to prepare for the introduction of number portability.

== List of area codes in Namibia ==
Area	Area Code
Ai-Ais	063
Aranos	063
Ariamsvlei	063
Aus	063
Bagani	066
Buitepos	062
Dordabis	062
Drimiopsis	062
Epupa	067
Gobabis	062
Grootfontein	067
Grünau	063
Halali	067
Helmeringhausen	063
Henties Bay	064
Hosea Kutako International Airport	062
Kalkfeld	067
Kalkrand	063
Kamanjab	067
Karasburg	063
Karibib	064
Katima Mulilo	066
Keetmanshoop	063
Khorixas	067
Klein Aub	062
Leonardville	062
Lüderitz	063
Maltahöhe	063
Mariental	063
Namibgrens	062
Namutoni	067
Nina	062
Noordoewer	063
Okahandja	062
Okaukuejo	067
Oranjemund	063
Oshikango	065
Otavi	067
Otjihase	062
Otjikondo	067
Otjimbingwe	064
Otjiwarongo	067
Outjo	067
Rehoboth	062
Rosh Pinah	063
Ruacana	065
Rundu	066
Seeheim	063
Seeis	062
Sesfontein	065
Solitaire	063
Stampriet	063
Swakopmund	064
Tsumeb	067
Uis	064
Usakos	064
Walvis Bay	064
Warmbad	063
Waterberg Plateau Park	067
Windhoek	061

060 - Telecom Switch cellular mobile (GSM; seven-digit subscriber numbers)
081 - MTC cellular mobile (GSM; seven-digit subscriber numbers)
083 - Paratus Telecommunications IP Voice (IP; seven-digit subscriber numbers)
084 - MTN Namibia
085 - tn mobile cellular mobile (GSM; seven-digit subscriber numbers)

The international access code is now 00 but was previously 09.
