= The Lone Stone Men =

Stone sculpture land art in Namibia

The Lone Stone Men of the Desert (also known as The Stonemen of Namibia or Lone Men of Kaokoland) is an ongoing land art project consisting of a variable number of anthropomorphic stone and metal sculptures scattered across remote areas of the Namib Desert in north‑western Namibia. The project is attributed to the anonymous Namibian artist or collective known by the pseudonym Renn.

== Origins and location ==
The first Lone Stone Men were reported around 2014 in the Kunene Region (formerly Kaokoland) in the extreme north‑west of Namibia, a sparsely populated area between the Skeleton Coast and the Angolan border. Sculptures have been sighted near off-road passes and tracks used by 4×4 vehicles, motorbikers and overland travellers, including areas around Puros, Van Zyl's Pass, Otjinungua and parts of the Skeleton Coast National Park.

== Description of the sculptures ==
Each Lone Stone Man is constructed primarily from locally available rocks stacked or assembled into a stylised human form, often reinforced or articulated with steel or iron rods. The figures adopt a variety of poses—standing, sitting, climbing, hanging or apparently resting—and are placed on ridges, in dry riverbeds, under isolated trees or on rocky outcrops. Many sculptures bear a small metal disc stamped with a number and a short phrase in English, suggesting a destination, state of mind or relationship to other unseen figures—for example “Heading for 1. Big gathering”, “Waiting for all my friends” or “I’ll get there sometime”.

The exact number of sculptures installed in the desert is unknown: some sources mention discs with numbers in the 40s while only a smaller subset has been documented in photographs or visited by travellers. According to the Biennale catalogue, the figures are periodically repositioned or modified, making the project a work “in becoming” that changes over time through natural erosion, human interaction and new additions.

== Artistic interpretation ==
Curatorial texts and critical commentary situate the Lone Stone Men within the tradition of land art, while also noting affinities with street art and environmental art. The official description by La Biennale di Venezia emphasises the works’ “stylised human figures” scattered through the “world’s most ancient desert” and their role in prompting reflection on the “deserts” that keep human cultures apart and on the need for encounters to discuss the place of humankind in nature.

The Namibian Pavilion catalogue links the project to philosophical aesthetics, citing Immanuel Kant’s idea that fine art must appear as nature even when recognised as art, and describes the figures as “petrified individuals” confronting the immense scales of geological and evolutionary time in the desert landscape. Journalistic accounts and travel essays highlight the sculptures’ simultaneous familiarity and estrangement, with some observers reading them as emissaries or sentinels that carry an implicit message of environmental conservation for Kaokoland and the planet.

== Authorship and anonymity ==
The project is attributed to a creator or group of creators who remain anonymous under the pseudonym RENN. Official texts for the Namibian Pavilion describe RENN as Namibian and deeply connected to the Kunene region but otherwise stress that demographic and biographical details are secondary to the work itself. The slogan “Art Before Artist” encapsulates the decision to foreground the sculptures and their dialogue with the desert rather than the identity or personal mythology of their author.

According to accounts reproduced in the Biennale catalogue, RENN consented to being referred to generically as “the artist” and to the use of the pseudonym, but declined to sign the sculptures individually, echoing earlier twentieth‑century experiments with anonymity and collective authorship. Media coverage notes that the mystery surrounding the creator has contributed to the project's appeal among travellers and in popular culture, where the “Stonemen of Kaokoland” are sometimes presented as part of the lore of Namibia's remote north‑west.

== Relationship to the Namibian Pavilion, Venice Biennale ==
In 2022, a selection of Lone Stone Men sculptures and related photographs formed the core of the Namibian national pavilion exhibition A Bridge to the Desert at the 59th Venice Biennale. Curated by Marco Furio Ferrario and installed on the island of La Certosa in Venice, the exhibition presented 16 sculptures transported from Namibia alongside 30 large‑format photographs depicting other figures that remained in their original desert locations.

The Biennale presentation was the first institutional exhibition dedicated to the project and introduced the Lone Stone Men to an international art audience. While the Venice installation was widely covered in art and design media, some critics and members of the Namibian arts community questioned whether the pavilion adequately represented the diversity of contemporary Namibian art, prompting a public debate about national pavilions and cultural policy.

== Tourism and popular reception ==
Outside institutional contexts, the Lone Stone Men have become a minor attraction among visitors to Kaokoland and the Namib Desert, with guidebooks, blogs and tour operators describing the search for the figures as a kind of treasure hunt undertaken by off-road travellers. Some commentators express concern that increased attention could lead to vandalism or environmental impact, noting that earlier sculptures placed closer to urban areas have been damaged or removed. Nevertheless, articles aimed at travellers often frame the project as an example of how contemporary artistic interventions can deepen engagement with Namibia's desert landscapes.

== See also ==
- Land art
- Namib
- Kaokoland
- 59th Venice Biennale
