= Namibia Tourism Board =

Autonomous body of government

The Namibia Tourism Board (NTB) is mandated by the Namibian Government as the regulatory and marketing body for tourism activities in Namibia, and is headquartered in Windhoek, Namibia.

The NTB was established by the Namibia Tourism Board Act, 2000 (Act 21 of 2000) and is the only legal national tourism authority in Namibia with a government regulatory mandate.

== Structure of the Namibia Tourism Board ==
The NTB is governed by a Board of Directors, appointed by the Minister of Environment and Tourism, and these board members appoint the NTB's executive.

== Funding ==
Funding of the NTB is carried out through:

- A Government grant.
- Registration and grading fees.
- Tourism levies (currently set at 2% and only being applied to accommodation establishments).
- Donations.

== Functions ==
The functions of the NTB are as follows:

- Promotion of Namibian tourism and travel to and within Namibia.
- Implementing measures to ensure that tourist facilities and services meet specified standards.
- Vetting of applications for registration, and grading of accommodation providers and regulated businesses.
- Ongoing training of persons engaged in tourism activities.
- Upholding development of the tourism industry.
- Active support and promotion of environmentally sustainable tourism.
- To advise and guide individuals engaged in the tourism industry.
- Promotion of local, regional and national tourism activities.
- Promotion of private sector associations within the tourism industry, as well as -

Advising the Minister on matters relating to:

- National policy on tourism.
- Incentives to encourage tourism development projects.
- Administration of the Namibia Tourism Board Act or other relevant laws.

== Regulatory framework ==
The NTB prescribes certain minimum requirements regarding physical facilities, safety, hygiene and service delivery for any accommodation or regulated tourism businesses. Only those establishments or businesses that meet the minimum requirements are registered and allowed to operate or conduct accommodation or tourism businesses legally. Tourism inspectors carry out routine grading and registration inspections to ensure compliance with and maintenance of these standards.
