= Hospitality Association of Namibia =

Trade association in Namibia

The Hospitality Association of Namibia (HAN) is a trade association for the hospitality sector in Namibia. It is funded by its members and serves as a self-regulating governing body for all aspects of the hospitality industry. It provides members with guidelines for service and access to training.

== Composition ==
An executive committee of its members, elected by its members, governs HAN.

== History ==
The Hospitality Association of Namibia was established in 1987 with 16 members, and membership has since grown to include over 400 members.

== Membership ==
Members of HAN include representatives of every area of hospitality, including hotels, guest houses, guest farms, lodges, rest camps, restaurants, conference centers and catering services.

== Office ==
The HAN head office is located in Namibia's capital city, Windhoek.
