= Protected areas of Namibia =

Protected areas in Namibia

The protected areas of Namibia include its national parks and reserves. With the 2010 declaration of Dorob National Park, Namibia became the first and only country to have its entire coastline protected through a national parks network. Protected areas are subdivided into game reserves and/or nature reserves, such as special protected area, wilderness areas, natural areas, and development areas. There are also recreation reserves. Facilities in the national parks are operated by Namibia Wildlife Resorts. Over 19% of Namibia is protected, an area of some 130,000 square kilometres. However, the Ministry of Environment & Tourism auctions limited hunting rights within its protected areas. The Namibia Nature Foundation, an NGO, was established in 1987 to raise and administer funds for the conservation of wildlife and protected area management. Communal Wildlife Conservancies in Namibia help promote sustainable natural resource management by giving local communities rights to wildlife management and tourism.

== National parks ==
Image	Name	Established	Area (km2)	Summary
	Bwabwata National Park	2007	6100	The NP includes the Mahango Game Park and Caprivi Game Park. Vegetation consists of tree and shrub savannah biome such as Zambezi teak (Baikiaea plurijuga), wild seringa (Burkea africana), and African teak (Pterocarpus angolensis). Some of the larger mammals include the Cape buffalo, hippopotamus, roan antelope, and predators are lion, leopard, Namibian cheetah and spotted hyena. Important bird species include black-winged pratincole and slaty egret.
	Dorob National Park	2010	57772	Dorob NP, meaning "dry land", is a 1,600 kilometres (990 mi) long strip of land, encompassing belts of coastal dunes and gravel plains, as well as Ramsar listed wetlands. With the park's creation the coastline from the Kunene River on the Angolan border to the Orange River on the South African border become a solid barrier of parks.
	Etosha National Park	1907	22220	The Etosha salt pans are the most noticeable geological features in the park. Vegetation types are mostly of woodland (mopane, the most common tree) and also savanna, grasslands and saline desert. There are about 114 mammal species, 340 bird species, 110 reptile species, 16 amphibian species and 1 species of fish (up to 49 species of fish during floods.) Mountain zebra is found in the largest numbers (2235).
	Khaudom National Park		3657.91	The dominant vegetation in the park, which is located in the Kalahari Desert is species-rich, high and short dry forest and dry acacia forest. Large mammals in the park include more than 3500 elephants, giraffes and antelopes, including horse antelopes, kudus, lyre antelopes, elands and reedbucks. 320 species of birds inhabit the area, including parrots and more than 50 birds of prey.
	Mamili National Park renamed Nkasa Rupara National Park in 2012	1 March 1990	343.17	The dominant flora is broadleaved trees and can be described as a Savanna biome and the vegetation type is Caprivi floodplains. Some of the mammals found include the elephant, the Cape buffalo (about 1,000 head of population), hippopotamus (560) and crocodile (500). Around 450 bird species have also been reported.
	Mudumu National Park	1990	737	This park is an important migration route of African elephant and many other large animals from Botswana to Angola. 430 bird species, including African fish eagle, African skimmer and western-banded snake eagle have been reported. Fish species in the park include the tiger fish and tilapia.
	Namib-Naukluft Park	1 August 1979	49,768	The Namib Desert (considered the world's oldest desert) and the Naukluft mountain range are part of the park. The desert dunes taper off near the coast, and lagoons, wetlands, and mudflats. In the hyper-arid region faunal species reported are snakes, geckos, unusual insects, hyenas, gemsboks and Black-backed jackals.
	Skeleton Coast National Park	1971	16,845	Designated in 1971, this park gets its name from the skeletal remains of shipwrecks, which numerous on this stretch of coastline. There are elephants that live in desert dunes and lions in the park. Springbok, plains zebra, gemsbok, jackals and ostrich are also reported. In the offshore part of the park, dolphins and whales are sighted.
	Waterberg Plateau Park	1972	405	Several of Namibia's endangered species were moved into this waterberg park (waterberg means "hill of water") for conservation. In 1989, black rhinoceros was reintroduced to the area from Damaraland. Sable, rone antelope, red heartebeest and steenbok are reported in the park. The lower hills of the mountain have over 200 species of bird with some rare species of small antelope. Some of the key bird species are black eagles, peregrine falcons and Cape vulture.

== Nature reserves ==
=== Cape Cross Seal Reserve ===
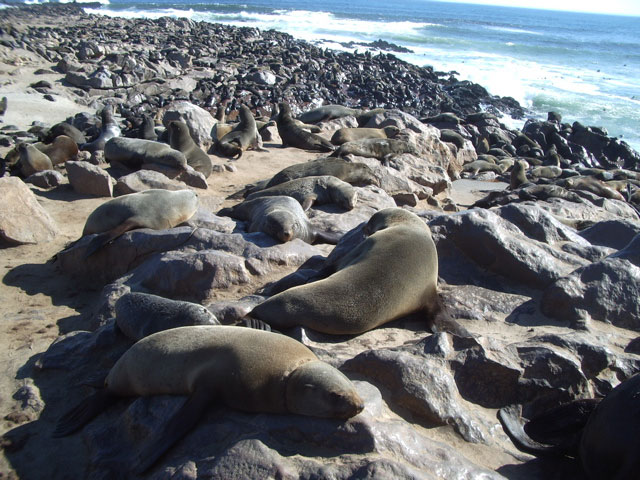
Colony of Cape fur seals in the Cape Cross Seal Reserve

Cape Cross is a protected area under the name Cape Cross Seal Reserve. The reserve is the home of one of the largest colonies of Cape fur seals in the world. Cape Cross is one of two main sites in Namibia where seals are culled, partly for selling their hides and partly for protecting the fish stock. The economic impact of seals on the fish resources is controversial: While a government-initiated study found that seal colonies consume more fish than the entire fishing industry can catch, animal protection society Seal Alert South Africa estimated less than 0.3% losses to commercial fisheries.

=== Daan Viljoen Game Reserve ===
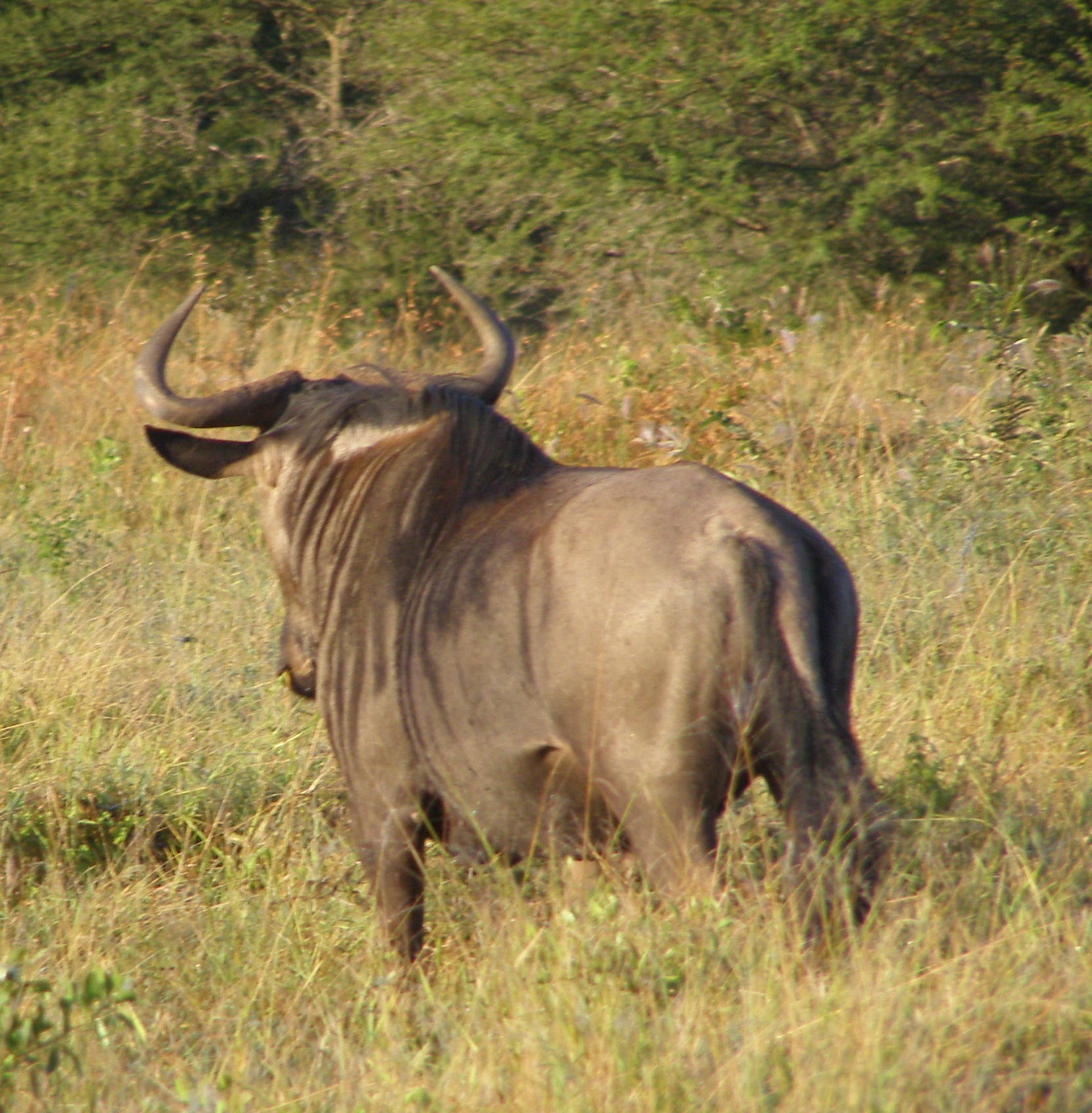
Blue wildebeest

The Daan Viljoen Game Reserve is a game reserve near Windhoek, situated in the hill area of Khomas Hochland. Over 200 species are found here, typical of the Namibian highlands, including Hartmann's mountain zebra, blue wildebeest, kudu, gemsbok, springbok, impala, rockrunner, white-tailed shrike, Monteiro's hornbill, Bradfield's swift, Rüppell's parrot and Carp's tit. In the 1990s a number of indigenous people in the area were resettled by the Namibian government. The park has many walking paths and allows tourists to travel around by themselves. It closed in 2010 to allow for the construction of the Sun Karros Daan Viljoen Lodge but has since reopened.

=== Hardap Recreation Resort ===
Hardap Recreation Resort surrounds Namibia's largest Hardap Dam, which opened in 1964 as a recreational area. Listed under IUCN Category IV, as of 2004 the park it covered an area of 252 square kilometres (97 sq mi), of which about 10% formed the lake area. As Reader's Digest said though, "ironically, although Hardap is one of Namibia's best-known resorts, the nature reserve is unfamiliar to the large majority of visitors." It contains over 100 species of birds.

=== Popa Game Park ===
The Popa Game Park is a small park where the Popa water fall, which drops by only 3 m over rapids on the Okavango River, is situated. Its thunderous sound is heard over a long distance. Bird species are a common sight and hippopotamus inhabit the river.

== Communal Area Conservancies ==
There is a number of gazetted communal conservancies in Namibia.

=== African Wild Dog Conservancy ===
African Wild Dog Conservancy is a registered community-based conservation area in the Otjozondjupa Region of Namibia, covering 3,824 km^{2} (1,476 sq mi), with an approximate human population of 4,713 people. It was established through a governmental declaration in 2005.

=== Ehirovipuka Conservancy ===
Ehirovipuka Conservancy is a gazetted communal area conservancy situated in the Kunene Region. It was established in January 2001 and covers an area of 1,980 square kilometres (760 sq mi). The reserve consists of mainly semi-desert and savannah woodlands, and the Ombonde River flows through the area. Animals living there include African bush elephant, African leopard, lion, South African cheetah, common eland, kudu, duiker, warthog, steenbok, gemsbok, Angolan giraffe, springbok, South African ostrich, and Hartman's mountain zebra. It contains a meat processing plant supplying tourist lodges. Other economic activity includes forestry and the sale of traditional craft products. Ehirovipuka Conservancy received a 20-year tourism concession in 2010.

== Private Game Reserves ==
=== Erindi Private Game Reserve ===
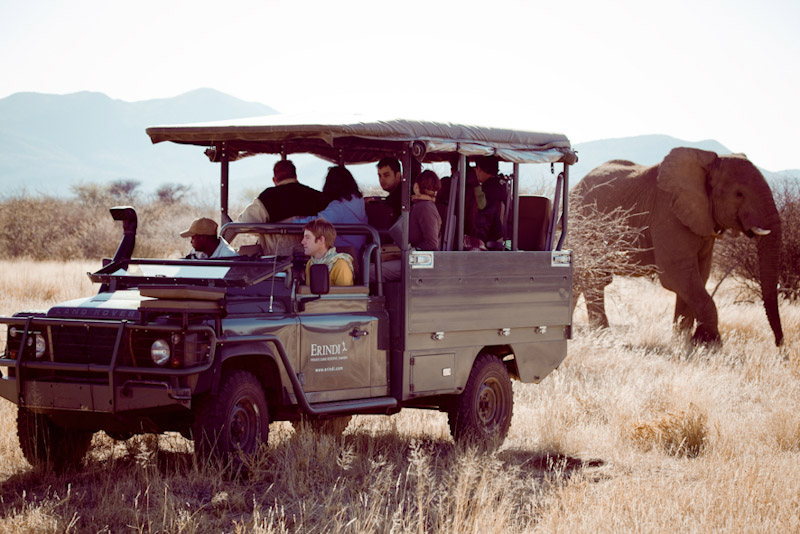
Erindi Private Game Reserve

The Erindi Game Reserve ('Erendi' meaning "Place of Water") is in the heart land of Namibia and covers an area of 70,000ha. It is located 40 km to the east of Omaruru town and lies between the Erongo Mountain Rhino Sanctuary Trust of Namibia and the Omatako Mountains. Habitats recorded are of mountainous areas, riverine vegetation, inselbergs and grassland savannahs. Leopard research is an important activity in the reserve. It also has a notable population of south-western black rhinoceros, lion, brown hyena, leopard and cheetah.

=== Gamsberg Nature Reserve ===
Gamsberg Nature Reserve is in central Namibia, located west of Rehoboth. It surrounds Gamsberg, Namibia's fourth highest mountain, with a peak elevation of 2,347 metres (7,700 ft).

=== Naankuse Wildlife Sanctuary ===
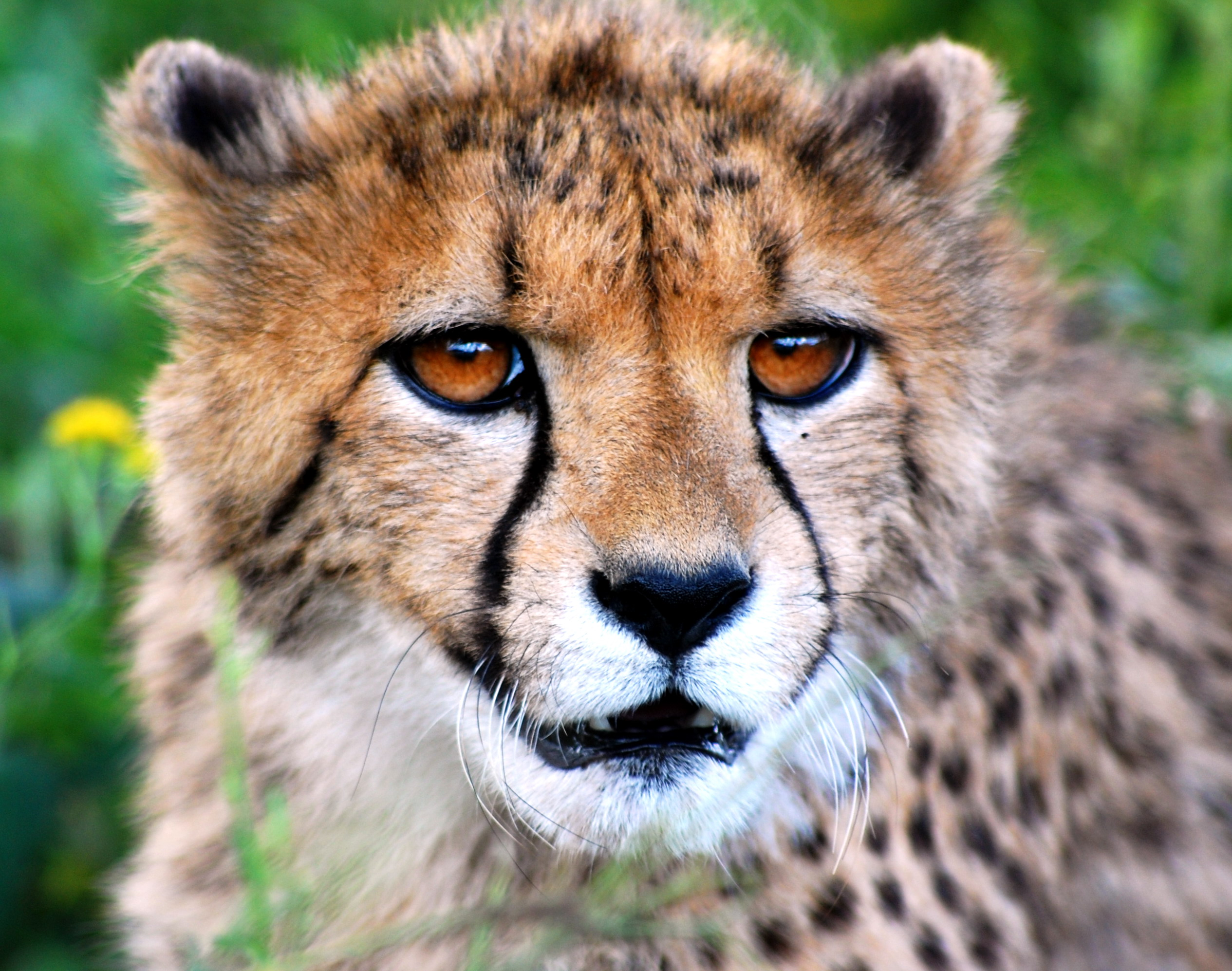
A cheetah in the Naankuse Wildlife Sanctuary.

The Naankuse Wildlife Sanctuary covers an area of 3,200 ha which is a sanctuary for orphaned animals. Some of the animals tended are lions, leopards, cheetahs, wild dogs, caracals and baboons. The animals reported in the wild of the sanctuary are giraffe, zebra, kudu, hartebeest, springbok, eland, jackal and also wild cheetahs and leopards. The sanctuary has developed a new method to identify cheetahs in the wild based on their paw prints. This is done in association with Wildtrack, AfriCat and Chester Zoo.

=== NamibRand Nature Reserve ===
The NamibRand Nature Reserve is a private nature reserve (largest such reserve in Africa) covering an area of 202,200 ha with four habitats of dunes and sandy plains, inselbergs and mountains gravel plains, and sand and gravel plains interface. The largest number of oryx (gemsbok or oryx) (3,200) and Antidorcas marsupialis (springbok) (12,400) are the dominant mammal species in the reserve. 150 bird species of birds are also reported. Other wild animals which are predators, recorded in the reserve are leopard, spotted and brown hyena, black-backed jackal, aardwolf, bat-eared fox, Cape fox, Southern African wildcat, caracal and genet.

=== Tsaobis Leopard Park ===
The Tsaobis Leopard Park is the only nature reserve in Namibia to conserve leopards in particular. Situated south of Karibib and east of Swakopmund, it was established in 1969.

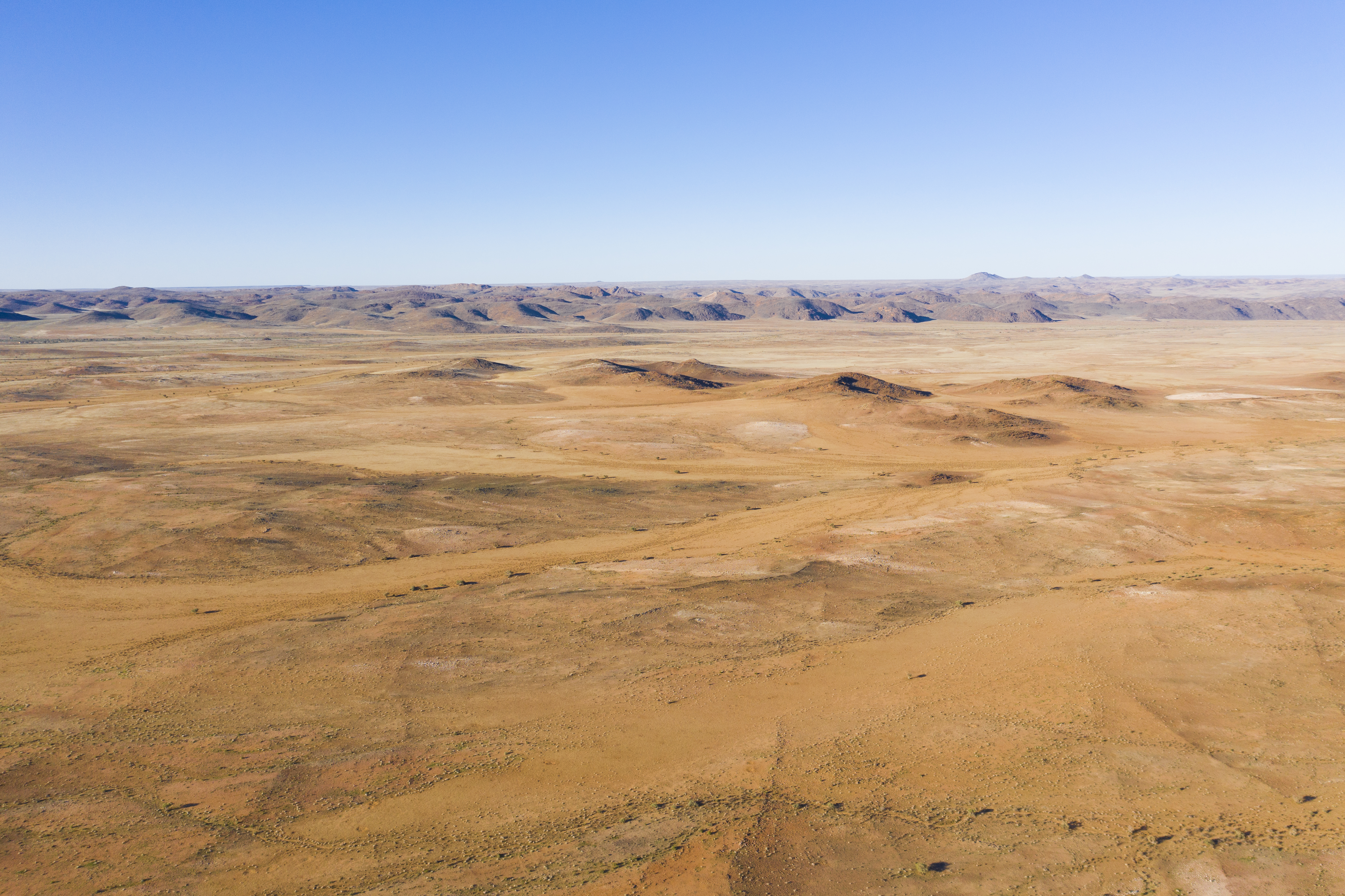
Sandfontein Nature Reserve

=== Sandfontein Nature Reserve ===
Sandfontein Nature Reserve is located in southern Namibia near the Orange River. The nature reserve covers an area over 200,000 acres and is home to many species of animal including aardvark, aardwolf, baboon, black backed jackal, cape clawless otter, eland, gemsbok (oryx), giraffe, Hartmann's zebra, klipspringer, kudu, leopard, ostrich, red hartebeest, rock hyrax, springbok, steenbok and wild donkey.

== Transboundary Protected Areas ==
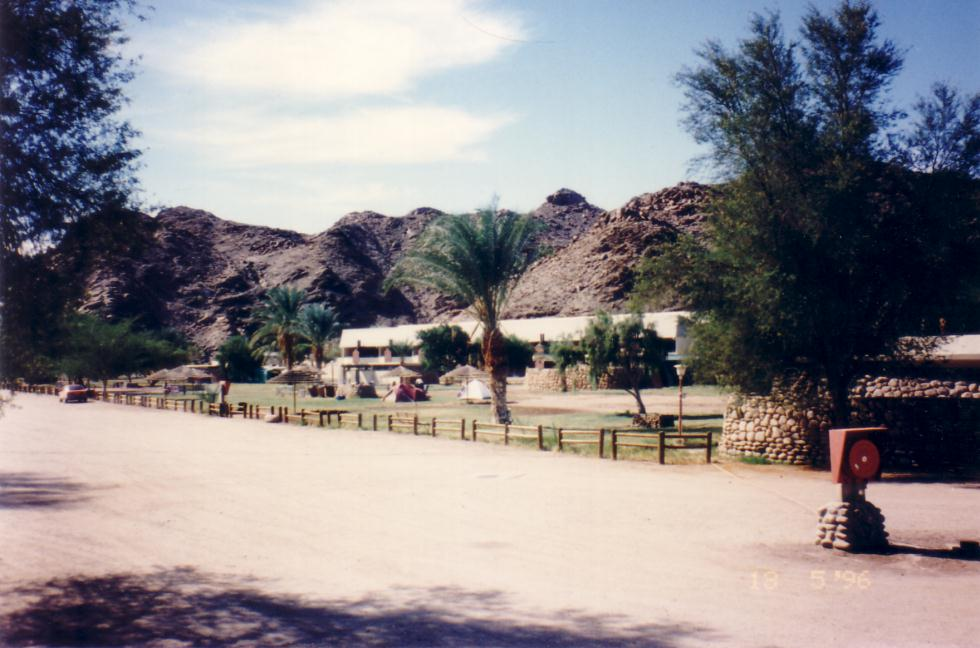
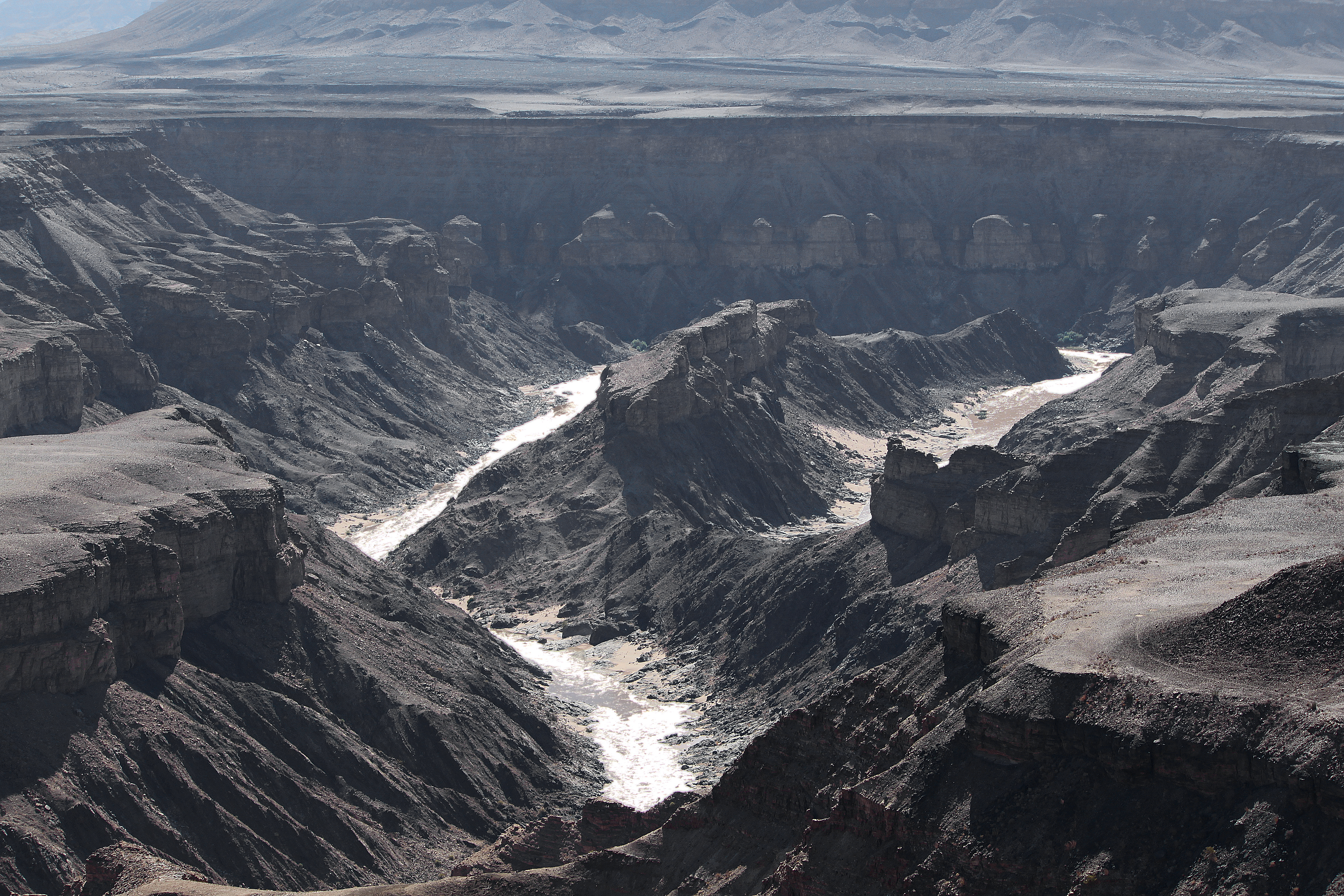
Left: Entrance to Ai-Ais Hot Springs; right: Fish River Canyon within the Ai-Ais/Richtersveld Transfrontier Park.

The protection is not necessarily limited to inside the borders of Namibia. In 2007 the Ai-Ais/Richtersveld Transfrontier Park, an international peace park, was created through the joint management of the Ai-Ais Hot Springs park, which includes parts of Fish River Canyon, and the Richtersveld National Park in neighbouring South Africa. Fauna includes rock hyrax, ground squirrel, jackal buzzard and Hartmann's mountain zebra.

In 2006, the countries of Namibia, Angola, Zimbabwe, Zambia, and Botswana signed an agreement creating the Kavango–Zambezi Transfrontier Conservation Area, a vast expanse of land designated primarily "'to establish a world-class transfrontier conservation area and tourism destination in the Okavango and Zambezi river-basin regions within the context of sustainable development", by linking different habitats and allowing animals the freedom of movement throughout this region of Africa.

In 2018 the governments of Namibia and Angola agreed on the creation of Iona – Skeleton Coast Transfrontier Conservation Area. This trans-border coastal park is formed by Angola's Iona National Park and Namibe Partial Reserve and Namibia's Skeleton Coast National Park.
