= Clan Alpine Shoal =

Reef off coast of Namibia

Clan Alpine Shoal is a reef off the coast of the Skeleton Coast in Namibia that has caused two major shipwrecks.

It lies about 8 km from the coast, south of the mouth of the Cunene River and 200 km from Cape Fria, at 18°8′ S 11°33′ E. The maps of the British Admiralty were uncertain as to the location of the rock formation, the highest points of which can pose a shipping hazard under certain conditions.

The British steamship SS Clan Alpine (1878) ran aground there on the morning of January 13, 1890 en route from Tilbury to Cape Town. Shortly before midnight on Sunday evening, November 29, 1942, another British vessel, the MV Dunedin Star, was also wrecked there.
