= Namibe Partial Reserve =

Protected area in Angola

- Reserva Parcial de Namibe
- IUCN category IV (habitat/species management area)
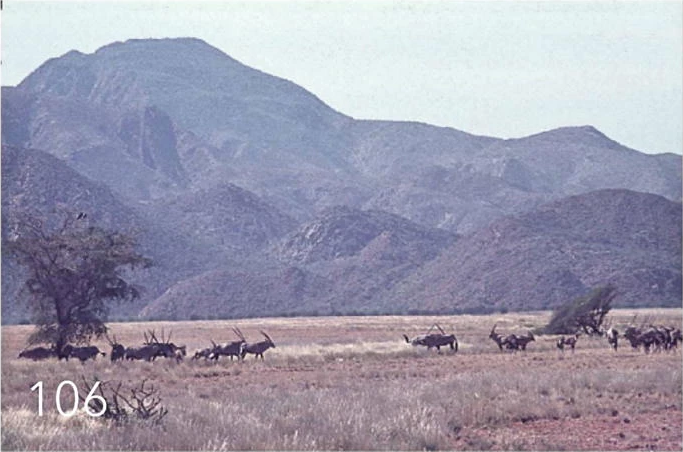
- Namibe is in the Kaokoveld Desert

- Location within Angola
- Location: Angola
- Nearest city: Namibe
- Coordinates: 15°45′57.92″S 12°24′7.68″E
- Area: 4,450 km^{2} (1,720 sq mi)
- Established: 1990

Namibe Partial Reserve (Reserva Parcial de Namibe) is a protected area in Angola. It is located to the north of Iona National Park, and separated by a narrow strip of occupied land along the Curoca River. This reserve has IUCN Category IV status and was proclaimed in 1960 by the authorities of Portuguese Angola. It covers 4,450 square kilometres (1,720 mi^{2}). This park is part of the Iona – Skeleton Coast Transfrontier Conservation Area.

Large sand dunes can be seen here, because the reserve is located in a desert area. Therefore, only plants resistant to this environment can be found, such as Welwitschia mirabilis, better known as the "desert octopus".

Mammals such as the elephant, kudu, oryx, black rhino and mountain zebra Hartmanns have previously appeared in the area, but their current status is uncertain.
