= Eduard Bohlen =

German cargo ship

Coordinates: 23°59′43″S 14°27′26″E

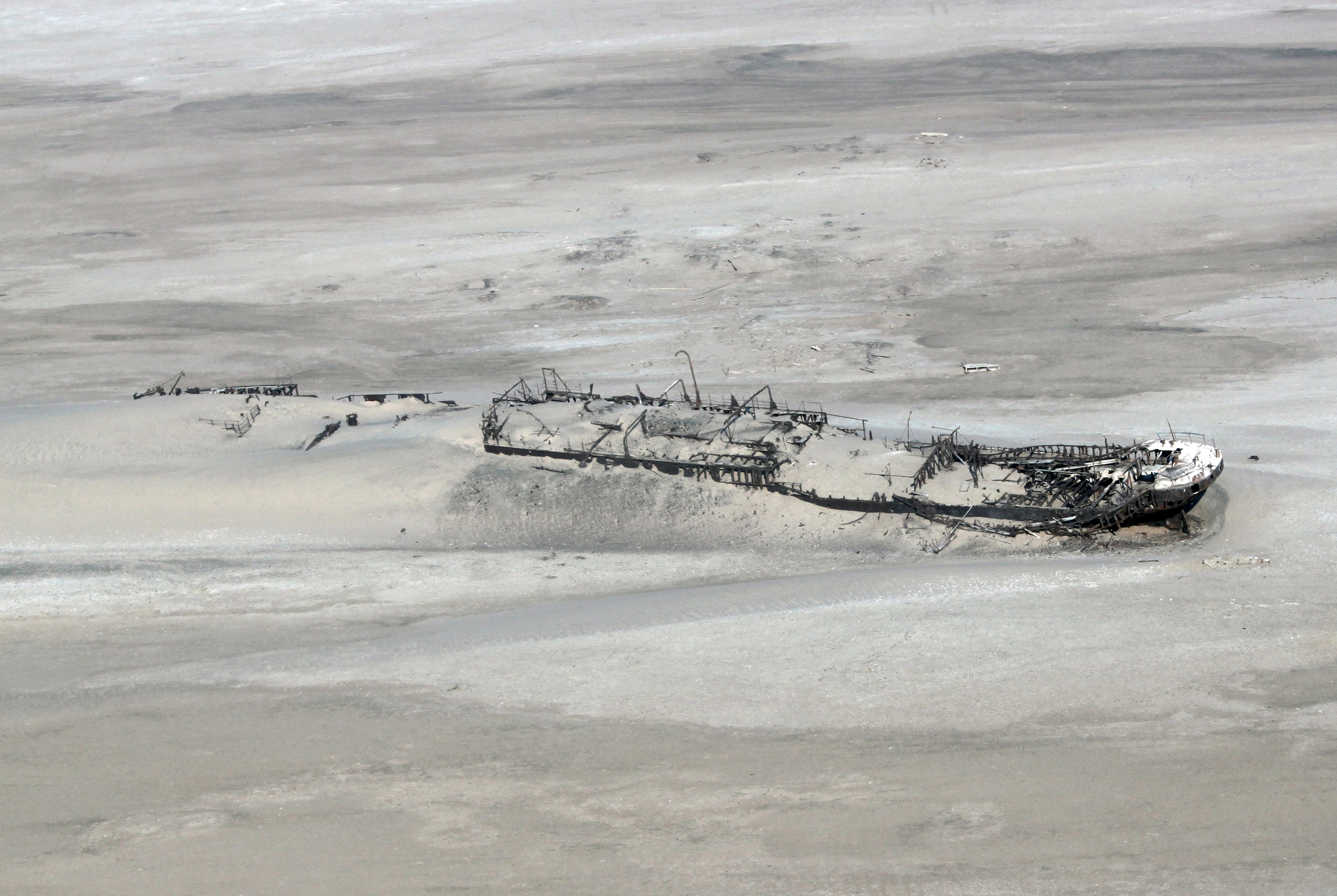
- Wreck of Eduard Bohlen on Namibia's Skeleton Coast

History

Germany
- Name: Eduard Bohlen
- Owner: Woermann-Linie, Hamburg
- Route: Hamburg - West Africa
- Builder: Blohm & Voss, Hamburg
- Yard number: 75
- Launched: 23 October 1890
- Completed: January 1891
- Fate: Wrecked, 5 September 1909

General characteristics
- Type: Passenger/cargo ship
- Tonnage: 2,272 GRT
- Length: 310 ft 6 in (94.64 m)
- Beam: 38 ft 1 in (11.61 m)
- Speed: 10.5 knots (19.4 km/h; 12.1 mph)
- Capacity: 32 first class and 14 second class passengers

Eduard Bohlen was a ship that was stranded on the Skeleton Coast of German Southwest Africa (now Namibia) while offloading equipment for a diamond mine on 5 September 1909 in a thick fog. After attempts made by marine vessel Otavi to get her afloat failed, the ship became entrenched in the sand. Miners later used it as a 'hotel' until the mine shut down.

The wreck currently lies in the sand 400 m (1,300 ft) from the shoreline.

== Service ==
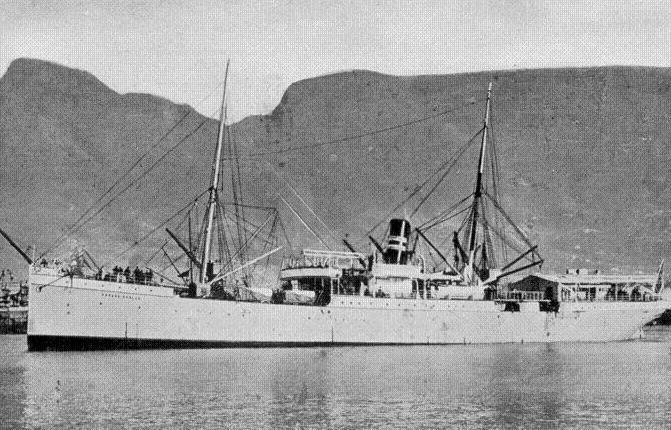
The ship in 1906.

Eduard Bohlen was a 2,272 gross ton cargo ship with a length of 94 m (310 ft). In September 1909, she ran aground in thick fog and was wrecked at Conception Bay while on a voyage from Swakopmund to Table Bay.

== Wreck ==
Bohlen lies near two other wrecks: Otavi, which foundered here and sank in 1945, and MV Dunedin Star, among the many wrecks of the Skeleton Coast.

== In popular culture ==
- The wreck was featured in the 1987 film Steel Dawn.
- A 1990s documentary on another vessel lost on the same beach miles away, the MV Dunedin Star, also featured the Bohlen.
- The wreck was featured in the 2011 television series Wonders of the Universe.
- It was featured in the 2016 Amazon Video series The Grand Tour.
- It features as the finish point for the 2020 sport relief The Heat Is On.
- It made an appearance in a scene in the 2024 Amazon Video series Fallout.
- The wreck features as an example of decay over time during the documentary Brian Cox's Adventures in Space and Time titled What is Time? (Series 1 Episode 4).
