= Iona National Park =

National park in Angola

- IUCN category II (national park)
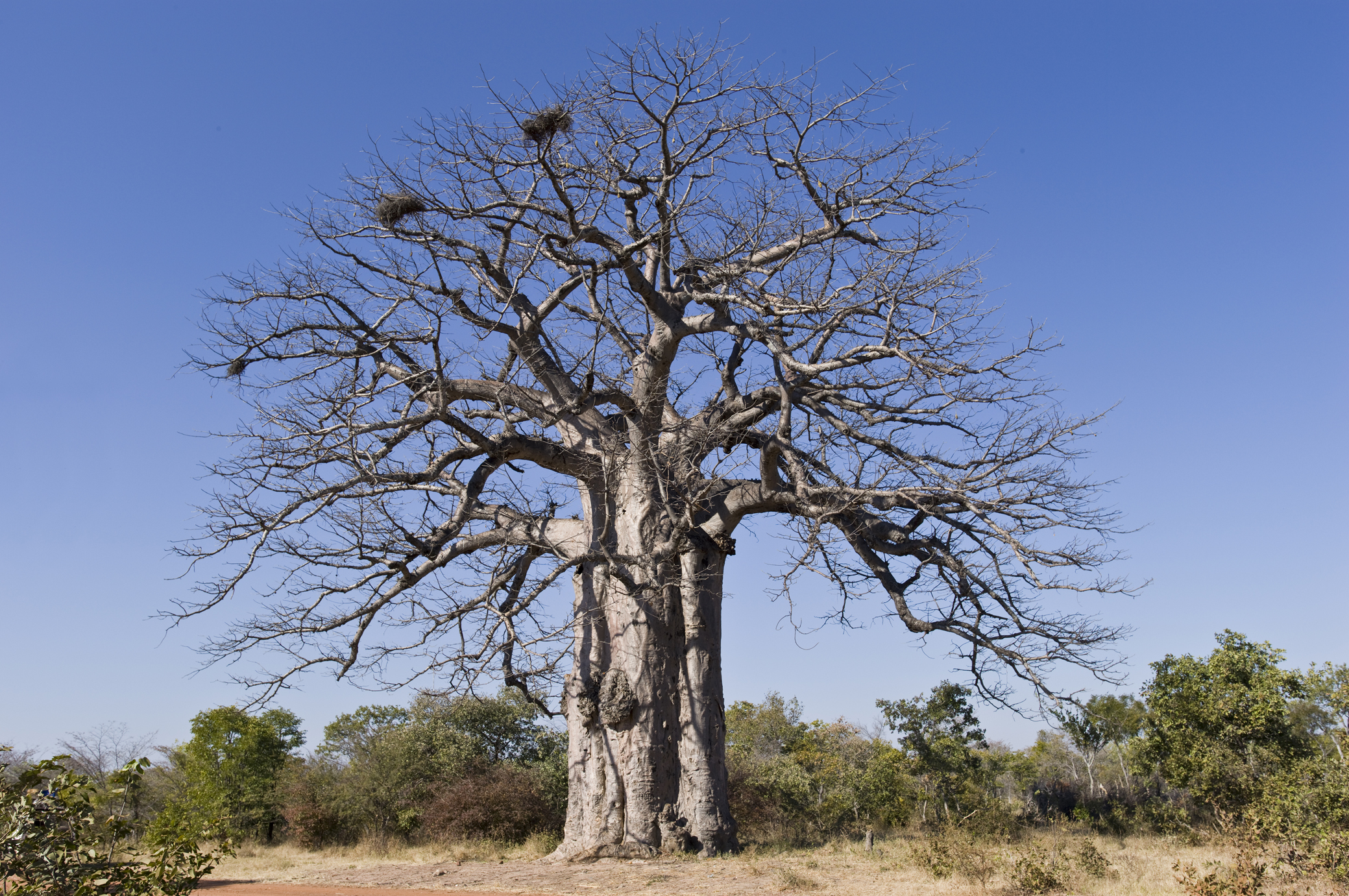
- Baobab, Iona National Park, Angola

- Location within Angola
- Location: (Angola)
- Nearest city: Lubango
- Coordinates: 16°40′S 12°20′E
- Area: 15,200 km^{2} (5,900 sq mi)
- Established: 1964
- Governing body: Ministeria do Ambiente, Angola

Iona National Park (Portuguese: Parque Nacional do Iona) is the largest and oldest national park in Angola. It is situated in the Southwestern corner of the country, in Namibe Province. It is roughly bound by the Atlantic Ocean to the West, an escarpment to the East that marks the beginning of the interior plateau, the Curoca River to the North, and the Cunene River to the South. It is about 200 kilometres (120 mi) south of the city of Namibe and covers 5,850 square miles (15,200 km^{2}) sq. miles.

The topography of Iona is characterised by shifting dunes, vast plains, and rough mountains and cliffs. Rainfall varies from about 100 mm on the coast to 300 mm or more on the eastern border. The Curoca River is intermittent but has lagoons, while the Cunene is permanent and has marshy areas at its mouth.

Iona was proclaimed as a reserve in 1937 and upgraded in 1964 to a national park named after Iona, a commune located within it. It is the oldest protected area in Angola. However, as is true for most Angolan parks, the Angolan Civil War greatly disrupted the area. Poaching and the destruction of infrastructure caused considerable damage to the once rich park.

Starting around 2009, a number of government and international projects have worked on rebuilding the infrastructure of the park, which will hopefully invite tourists back. Tourism can provide tangible economic value to surrounding communities, giving them a reason to protect the park. However, a study published in 2019 reported that while the local population recognized the benefits of the park, they were concerned for their historical and current use of the land. A major use is for pasturing livestock and grazing.

African Parks began co-managing the park in 2020. The five pillars of the park are "tourism, community, inspection, conservation and infrastructure". In 2024, there were 135 employees.

== Geography ==
Iona is in the northern Namib Desert, the only true desert in Southern Africa. The area, also known as the Kaokoveld Desert, is considered one of the oldest deserts in the world at 55-80 million years old. It faces the Atlantic Ocean for 180 kilometres (110 mi) on the edge of the Benguela Current, a cold up-welling from the depths of the Atlantic that creates a rich offshore ecosystem. To the east, Iona rises to the base of the Great Escarpment at the Tchamaline and Cafema mountains.

Iona is bound on the north and south by the Kunene and Curoca Rivers, respectively. The climate is noteworthy for the heavy fogs created as the cold, wet air of the Benguela up-welling meets the hot, dry air of the desert. The strong fogs and currents have led to numerous shipwrecks throughout history. The coast is sometimes called Skeleton Coast after these shipwrecks as well as the numerous skeletons of whales and seals found on the beaches. The area is classified as a Hot Desert Climate, BWh in the Köppen climate classification.

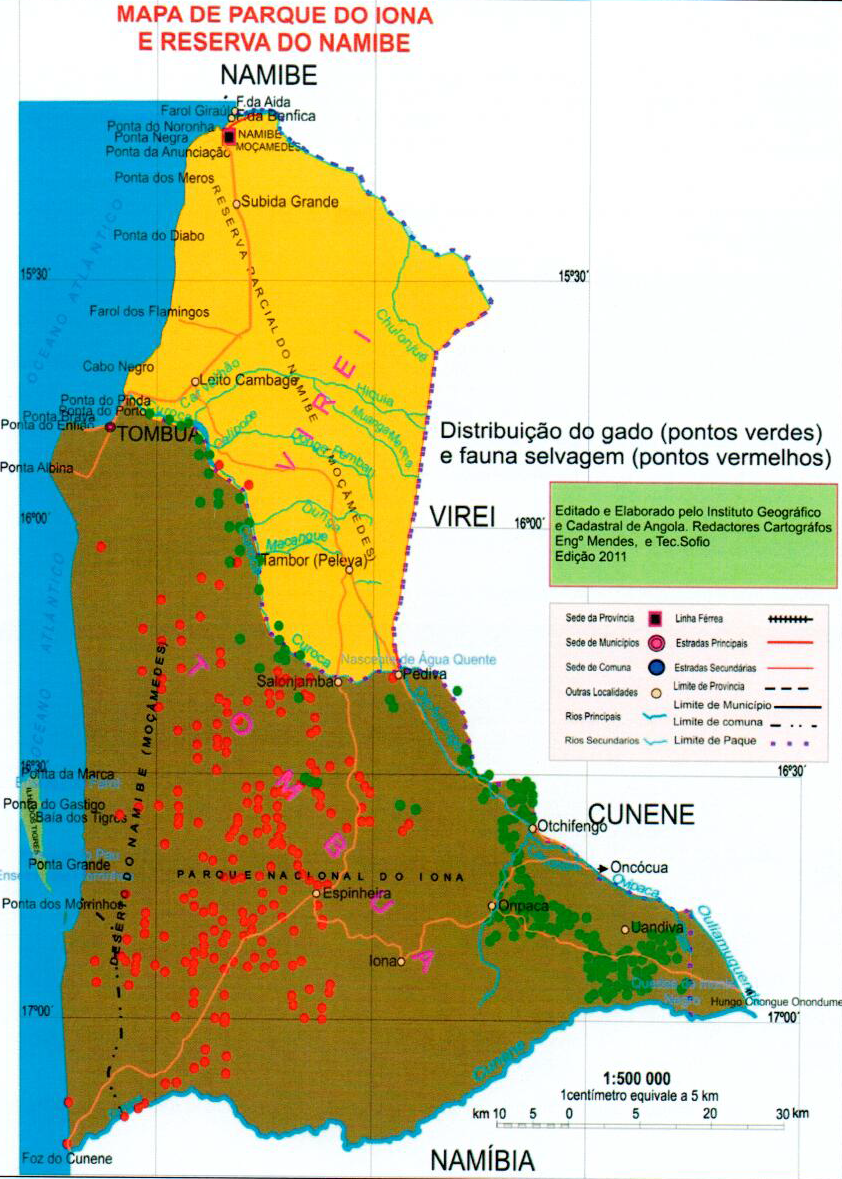

The park is contiguous with the Skeleton Coast National Park in Namibia, which is itself contiguous with the Namib-Naukluft National Park so that all three protected areas form a continuous block covering some 50,000 km^{2} of Namib Desert coastline and adjacent dunes.

== Flora and fauna ==
=== Flora ===
According to the Angola Ministry of the Environment, there are three types of vegetation at Iona National Park:

- Sub-coastal steppes with woody and herbaceous components: This type of vegetation is a sub-coastal African steppe-like formation dominated by Acacia, Commiphora, Colophosphormum, Aristida, Schmidita, and Staria species.
- Coastal steppes, which corresponds to sub-desert-like vegetation: This type of vegetation is dominated by Aristida, Cissus, Salvadora, and Welwitschia species.
- Desert with moving dunes: This type of vegetation is dominated by Odyssea and Sporobolus species.

The park is the main habitat of Welwitschia mirabilis, a plant sometimes referred to as a "living fossil". The plant derives its moisture from sea-fog dew which rolls in from the Atlantic. The dew is absorbed through the leaves rather than through roots alone.

=== Fauna ===
Because of its distinctive habitat and climate, Iona and the Kaokoveld Desert have a number of endemic animals, particularly reptiles. Of the 63 species recorded in the ecoregion, eight are strictly endemic. The endemics include two lizards, three geckos, and three skinks. In 2022, there were 75 amphibian and reptile species recorded. Of these, 40 were recorded for the first time within the park.

The mouth of the Cunene River to the south supports a small wetland area that is important to migrating birds. In 2001, according to BirdLife International, about 114 species of bird were recorded for the area. 58 species were waterbird. Around 250 species were recorded as of 2024. In 2023, a coastal survey reported 55,000 Cape cormorant. In 2001, the park was one of the few remaining places in Angola with common ostriches, and the only locality with recorded Greater kestrel breeding.

South African cheetahs were sighted in the park for the first time in 2010. The civil war eradicated the elephant and rhino populations. In 2024, the park supported viable populations of zebra, oryx, and springbok. There were also remnant populations of cheetah, leopard, and brown hyena. Other animals include aardwolf, chacma baboon, and the vervet monkey. A massive undertaking in July 2023 saw 14 Angolan giraffe return to the park. The giraffes, thought extinct since the 1990s, arrived from a private game farm in Namibia, a further 13 giraffes were moved to Iona on the 18th May 2024. The feasibility of reintroducing the black rhino and lion is being investigated.

== Conservation ==
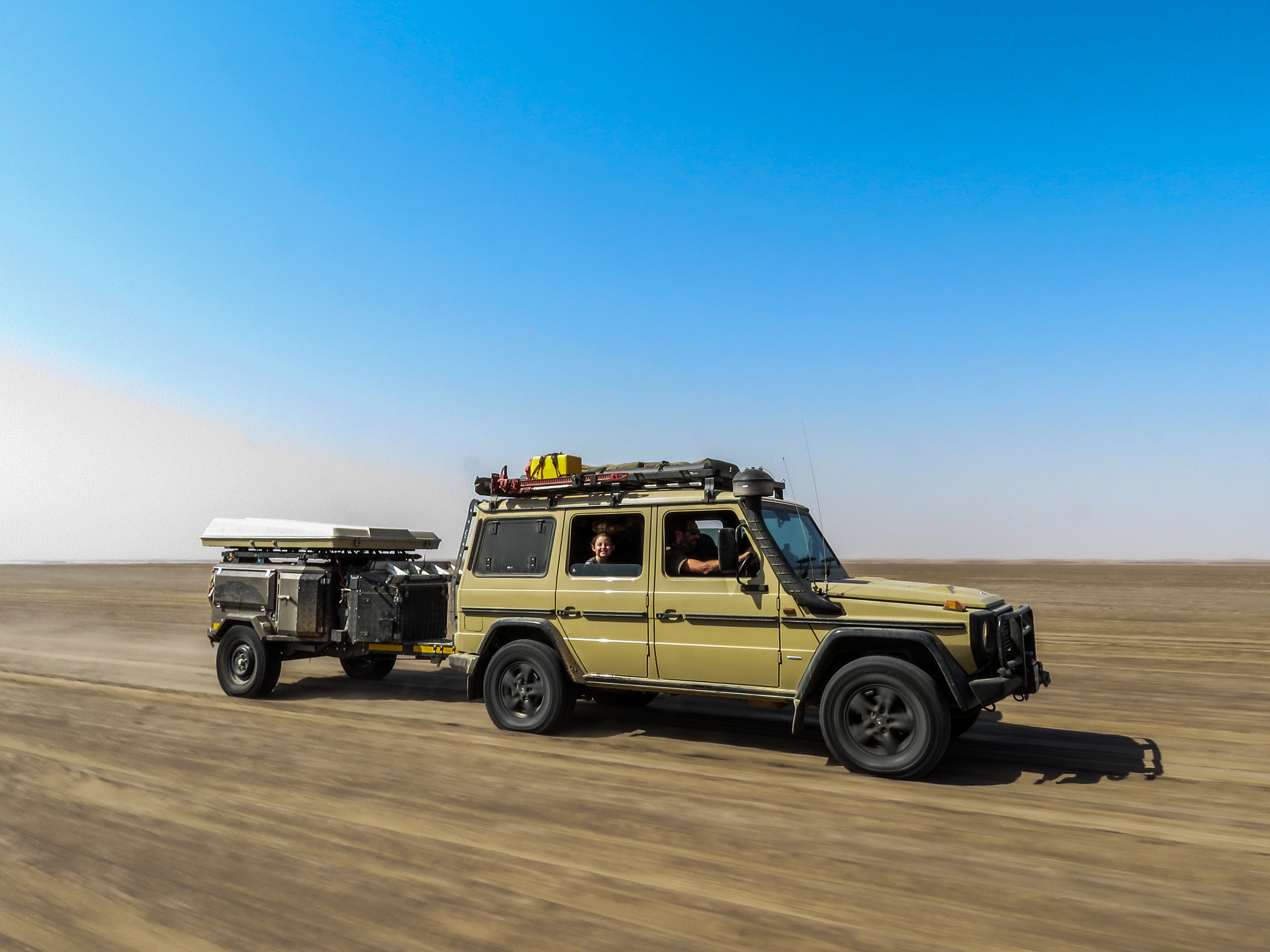
Off-roading

From 2009 to 2019, a multinational program under the UNDP worked with the Ministry of Environment (MINAMB) and local leaders to rehabilitate the park. Results have been recorded in the training and development of local staff, improvements to park infrastructure (fencing, roads, water supply, waste management, etc.), and the development of sound management for Iona.

In 2018, the Iona - Skeleton Coast Transfrontier Conservation Area was established. The TFCA covered a region from northern Namibia to southern Angola. This 3-year project was designed to implement conservation monitoring technology across country borders.

In January 2020, Iona National Park fell under the management of African Parks, a non-governmental organization (NGO) focused on conservation. Together with the government, African Parks works closely with local communities, implements law enforcement, and restores wildlife. They work to position the park as a key destination and to ensure the long-term ecological, social, and economic sustainability of Iona National Park.
