= Cape Fria =

Headland on the northern coast of Namibia

- Location: Kunene Region, Namibia
- Coordinates: 18°27′00.00″S 12°01′00.00″E

Cape Fria (literally "cold cape") is a headland overlooking the South Atlantic Ocean situated along the northern shoreline of Namibia, about 120 km (75 mi) to the northwest of Mowe Bay and 200 km to the south of the Angolan border. It is located in Skeleton Coast National Park. Due to its remoteness, it is accessible only by air.

== History ==
Cape Fria was discovered, along with Cape Cross, in 1486 by the Portuguese sailor Diogo Cão.

Since the beginning of the 1980s, there have been plans to build a deep-sea port along with a railway connection near Cape Fria to connect the north of Namibia — as well as the neighboring countries of Botswana, Zambia, Zimbabwe, and Angola — to international maritime traffic. Such a project would benefit Namibia's position in intra-African trade, but it has not been pursued, particularly on account of financing and environmental issues. The construction of a harbor and a rail connection has been planned since 2011 and was confirmed in October 2014, with the government dedicating $1.8 million USD to the project.
