= MV Dunedin Star =

UK refrigerated cargo liner

Coordinates: 18.13°S 11.55°E

History

United Kingdom
- Name: Dunedin Star
- Namesake: Dunedin, New Zealand
- Owner: Union Cold Storage Ltd
- Operator: Blue Star Line
- Port of registry: (United Kingdom) London
- Builder: Cammell Laird, Birkenhead
- Yard number: 1009
- Launched: 29 October 1935
- Completed: February 1936
- Identification: UK official number 164578; Call sign MKMP
- Fate: Grounded on the Skeleton Coast, 29 November 1942

General characteristics
- Class & type: Refrigerated cargo ship
- Tonnage: 12,891 GRT; tonnage under deck 11,648; 8,020 NRT
- Length: 530 ft (162 m) p/p; 551.0 ft (167.9 m) o/a
- Beam: 70.4 ft (21 m)
- Draught: 43 ft 4 in (13.2 m)
- Depth: 32.3 ft (10 m)
- Installed power: 2,516 NHP
- Propulsion: 2 × 9-cylinder Sulzer Bros marine diesel engines; twin screws
- Capacity: cargo + 21 passengers
- Crew: 85
- Sensors & processing systems: wireless direction finding; echo sounding device; gyrocompass
- Armament: DEMS

Service record
- Operations: Operation Halberd, 1941

MV Dunedin Star was a British refrigerated cargo liner. She was built by Cammell Laird and Co in 1935–36 as one of Blue Star Line's Imperial Star-class ships, designed to ship frozen meat from Australia and New Zealand to the UK. The ship served in the Second World War and is distinguished for her role in Operation Halberd to relieve the siege of Malta in September 1941.

Dunedin Star was lost at the end of November 1942 when she ran aground at Clan Alpine Shoal in the South Atlantic on the Skeleton Coast of Namibia, then South West Africa. A complex sea, air and land operation overcame many setbacks and rescued all of her passengers, crew and gunners. An aircraft, a tug and two of the tug's crew were lost in rescue attempts. It took a month for the last of Dunedin Star's crew to reach Cape Town, and more than two months for the last of the rescuers to return.

== Building ==
Cammell Laird and Co in Birkenhead, England built Dunedin Star, launching her on 29 October 1935 and completing her in February 1936. The ship was owned by Union Cold Storage, a company controlled by Blue Star Line.

The Imperial Star class were motor ships. Dunedin Star had a pair of 9-cylinder, two-stroke, single-acting Sulzer Bros marine diesel engines developing a total of 2,516 NHP and driving twin screws. Her navigation equipment included wireless direction finding, an echo sounding device and a gyrocompass.

== Second World War service ==
After the United Kingdom entered the Second World War in September 1939, Dunedin Star initially continued her cargo liner service between Britain and Australia. As she was a fast merchant ship, she sailed unescorted until November 1940.

On 10 October 1939, the ship left Liverpool for Brisbane. She called at Las Palmas, Cape Town, Port Elizabeth, East London, Durban, Lourenço Marques, Sydney and Rockhampton, and reached Brisbane on 26 November. Three days later, the ship began her return voyage, and called at Newcastle, New South Wales, Sydney, Melbourne and Adelaide. She spent Christmas of 1939 sailing west across the Indian Ocean and New Year's Day of 1940 in Cape Town, then called at Las Palmas. On 18 January, she reached London.

On 31 January 1940, Dunedin Star left London for Brisbane again. She called at Las Palmas and Gladstone, Queensland, and reached Brisbane on 10 March. She began her return voyage six days later, and called at Albany, Western Australia; Fremantle; Cape Town and Las Palmas, reaching London on 3 May.

On 2 June 1940, Dunedin Star left London for Queensland again. She called at Lisbon, São Vicente, Cape Verde, Melbourne, Sydney, Brisbane and Cairns, and reached Townsville in northeastern Queensland on 18 July. On 22 June France had surrendered to Germany, which removed the powerful French Navy from the defense of Allied shipping, gave all of France's Atlantic ports and naval bases to the Kriegsmarine and its most strategic airfields to the Luftwaffe. Therefore, when Dunedin Star began her voyage home from Townsville on 21 July, she called at Rockhampton and Sydney but then turned east across the Pacific Ocean to Panama. She reached Balboa, Panama on 23 August, passed through the Panama Canal and called at Cristóbal, Colón two days later. The ship called at Curaçao in the Netherlands Antilles before crossing the North Atlantic, reaching Avonmouth on the Bristol Channel on 10 September.

Dunedin Star stayed in Avonmouth for a month, leaving on 10 October and reaching Liverpool two days later. On 1 November, she left Liverpool with Convoy WS 4, which divided into fast (WS 4F) and slow (WS 4S) sections. Dunedin Star went with WS 4F to Freetown, Sierra Leone and then continued via Durban to Suez, where she arrived on 22 December. She seems to have spent Christmas of 1940 and New Year's Day of 1941 in Suez. On 12 January, she left for Colombo in Ceylon, where she arrived on 22 January. She made the Red Sea leg of her voyage from Suez to Aden with Convoy SW 4B, then detached and crossed the Indian Ocean unescorted.

=== Operation Halberd ===
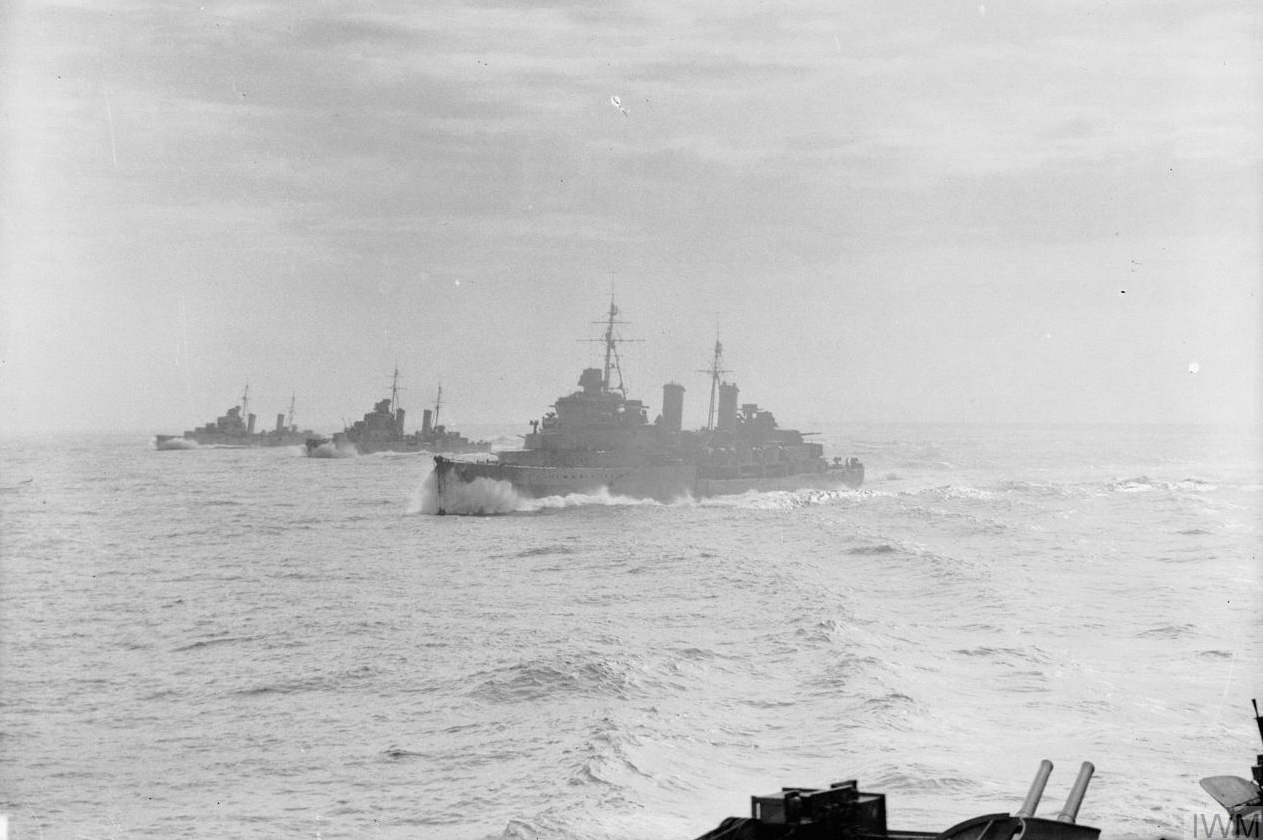
Part of the escort of Convoy GM 2 to Malta: Royal Navy cruisers HMS Edinburgh, Hermione and Euryalus

By August 1941, Dunedin Star was back in Britain. On 9 August, she left the Firth of Clyde with Convoy WS 8C to Scapa Flow, returning to the Clyde on 17 August. Then, with a Blue Star sister ship, Imperial Star, she took part in Operation Halberd to relieve the siege of Malta. On 17 September they left the Clyde with Convoy WS 011D, which at sea became Convoy WS 11X. The convoy was bound for Bombay but the ships for Operation Halberd detached in the North Atlantic and reached Gibraltar on 24 September. There eight merchant ships formed Convoy GM 2, which left the same day under heavy Royal Navy escort for Malta.

On 27 September 1941, the Mediterranean Italian Regia Aeronautica aircraft attacked the convoy but were repulsed by naval escorts and air cover. That evening an Italian torpedo bomber hit Imperial Star. No crew were killed and the ship did not sink but was disabled so she was scuttled and abandoned. The remainder of the convoy safely reached the Grand Harbour at Valletta the next day. Dunedin Star stayed in Malta for four weeks, leaving unescorted on 22 October and calling at Gibraltar three days later.

Dunedin Star's movements for the next five months are not recorded. Then on 22 March 1942, she left the Clyde with Convoy WS 17 to Freetown. She continued via Cape Town to the Indian Ocean, reaching Bombay on 16 May and leaving Colombo on 13 July for Fremantle. There she joined Convoy ZK 12, which left on 27 July for Sydney. Dunedin Star detached en route and reached Melbourne on 3 August. Again, she returned from Australia to Britain via Panama, where she called on 17 September before crossing the North Atlantic and reaching Liverpool on 1 November.

== Loss ==
On 9 November 1942, Dunedin Star left Liverpool for Egypt via Saldanha Bay, Cape Town and Aden. Her cargo was munitions and supplies for the British Eighth Army in the Middle East, and she was carrying 85 crew and 21 fare-paying passengers.

Approximate position of Dunedin Star's wreck on the coast of Namibia

Dunedin Star left Liverpool with Convoy ON 145, which was bound for New York. In the North Atlantic Dunedin Star detached and headed for South Africa. However, at 22h30 on 29 November off the Skeleton Coast of South West Africa she struck an underwater obstacle, presumed by the subsequent South African Court of Inquiry to be the poorly charted Clan Alpine Shoal. Her wireless operator sent a distress signal, which was received ashore at Walvis Bay.

Dunedin Star began rapidly taking on water and her pumps were unable to cope. Her master, Captain RB Lee, chose to beach the ship for the safety of her passengers, crew, and valuable cargo. In a heavy sea she grounded 550 yards (500 m) offshore, about 50 miles (80 km) south of the Cunene River mouth which formed the border with Portuguese Angola.

Captain Lee feared the heavy sea could break up the ship. Therefore, he had the crew lower her motor boat and start putting people ashore. The boat completed two trips, putting ashore a total of 63 people including eight women, three babies and a number of elderly men. Then the rough sea disabled the boat and she was stranded on the beach. They were left with no shelter and only the boat's water and food rations to sustain them. Another 42 people, including Captain Lee, were left aboard the beached ship.

A South African Railways and Harbours tug, the 328 GRT Sir Charles Elliot, left Walvis Bay and headed north to reach the wreck. The 197 GRT minesweeper HMSAS Nerine, a converted civilian vessel, left Walvis Bay at 14h00 on 30 November, laden with emergency supplies packed into Carley floats to take ashore to the survivors on the beach. The Norwegian 6,465 GRT cargo ship Temeraire and Manchester Liners' 6,048 GRT cargo steamship Manchester Division also diverted to help. Meanwhile, from Windhoek a land rescue convoy, led by Captain JWB Smith of the South African Police, set out to reach those survivors who were ashore.

The ships reached Dunedin Star on 1 or 2 December. Nerine launched some of her supply-laden Carley floats to reach the shore party, but the strong current swept them away. She moved closer to the shore, launched her remaining floats and returned to Walvis Bay. Temeraire launched her motor boat and took 10 men off Dunedin Star, but the boat shipped a lot of water which stopped her motor. The Norwegian boatmen then rowed for an hour-and-a-half to Manchester Division, which took the 10 survivors aboard. The Norwegians were now so exhausted that Temeraire had to take them and their boat back aboard. The next day Sir Charles Elliot arrived. Temeraire again lowered her motorboat, which in four trips rescued the remaining 32 men from Dunedin Star and transferred them all to Sir Charles Elliot. In the heavy sea the tug then struggled to get alongside Manchester Division to transfer all of the rescued men except Captain Lee and his chief and second engineers, who were taken aboard Nerine.

On 3 December, Sir Charles Elliot left to return to Walvis Bay, but about 06h00 the next morning she grounded just north of Rocky Point. Most of her crew managed to swim ashore through the strong current, but First Officer Angus McIntyre and deckhand Mathias Korabseb did not survive.

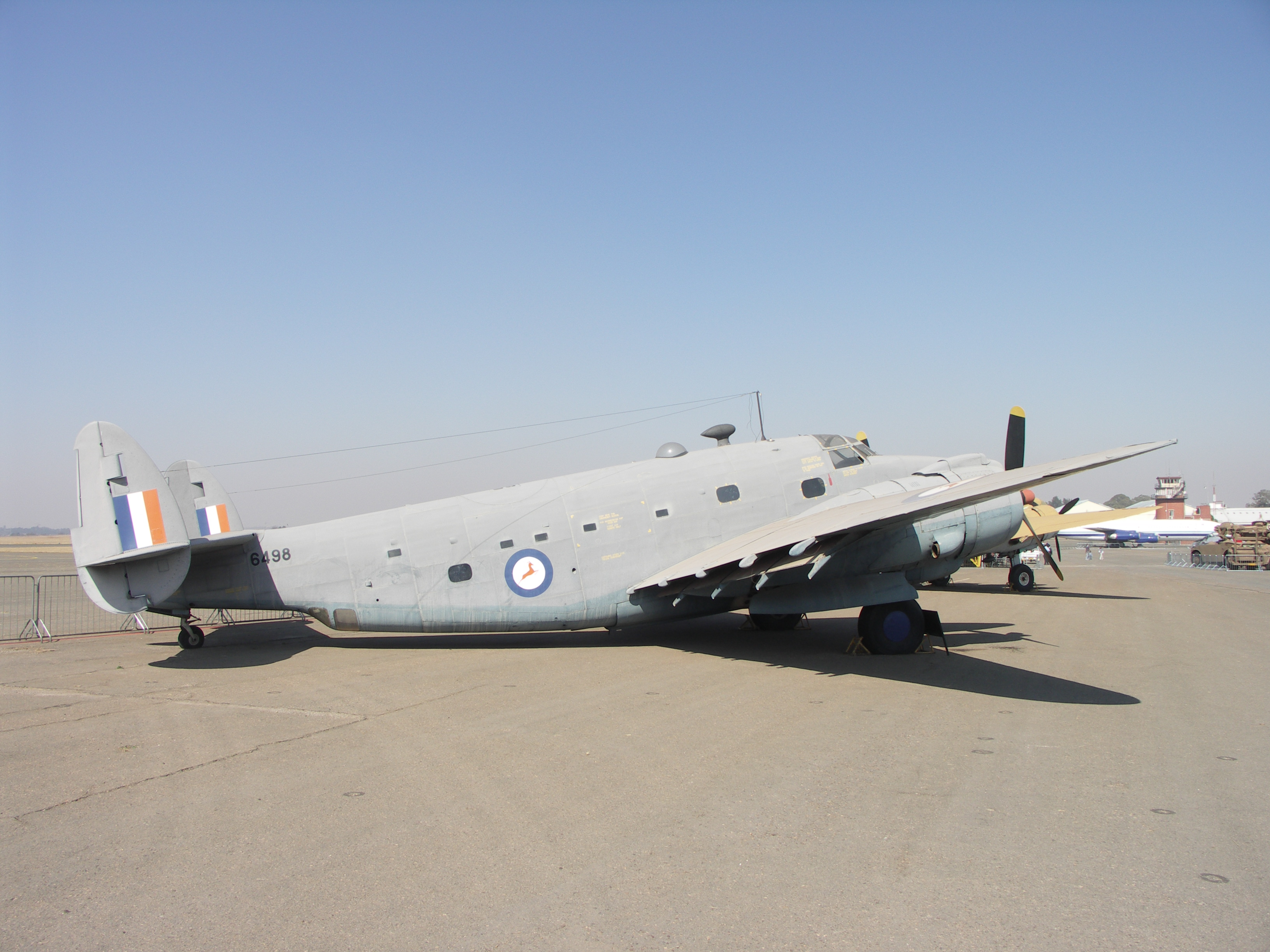
A SAAF Lockheed Ventura aircraft

At 14h00 on 3 December, a South African Air Force Lockheed Ventura coastal patrol aircraft was sent from Cape Town to drop supplies on the beach for the survivors. At about 16h20 the pilot, Captain Immins Naude, found the beach. His crew dropped the supplies but most were destroyed on impact. Naude landed on a nearby flat piece of land with the intention of rescuing some of the remaining survivors on the beach. Unfortunately, the land was a salt pan obscured by desert sand. The next day it was discovered that the Ventura's undercarriage had sunk through the crusted surface of the salt, damaging the aircraft and leaving it stuck in the sand.

Three other SAAF Venturas flew supply missions to drop water, food and other emergency supplies. They often flew several flights a day to the survivors on the beach. At times they also dropped supplies to Captain Smith's land convoy on the way from Windhoek to the beach. On 8 December Captain Smith's land convoy reached Rocky Point and Sir Charles Elliot's survivors and took them to a makeshift landing strip. There Lt Col PS Joubert landed a Ventura and picked up the tug's surviving crew.

In Walvis Bay, Nerine refuelled and loaded new supplies, and on 7 December headed north again. She reached Dunedin Star two days later and launched her lifeboat, which unsuccessfully tried to fire a line ashore by rocket. Instead Nerine's radio operator, Denis Scully, swam ashore with a rope tied around his waist. That day 14 crew, two women and two children were taken off the beach and transferred to Nerine. On 10 December eight more of the survivors from the beach were transferred to the minesweeper.

Captain Smith's convoy then reached the beach and rescued those survivors who had not been transferred by lifeboat to Nerine. Smith's 11 trucks got back to Windhoek on 23 December, where the survivors stayed before continuing overland by train. They reached Cape Town on 28 December.

On 17 January 1943, Captain Naude left Windhoek leading an overland convoy to recover the Ventura. After on-site repairs and a four-day digging effort, he finally got the plane airborne on 29 January. However, after only 43 minutes' flying time the aircraft developed engine trouble and crashed into the sea about 200 yards offshore near Rocky Point. Naude and his two fellow aircrew members survived the crash and managed to swim ashore. Their returning land convoy rescued them on 1 February.

All of Dunedin Star's passengers, crew and DEMS gunners survived, thanks to the resource of many rescuers by sea, air, and land. But it was at a cost: the losses of one Ventura aircraft and the tug Sir Charles Elliot, and the deaths of two of the tug's crew.

The Court of Enquiry found Captain Lee culpable for the loss of his ship. Blue Star Line dismissed him and he turned to be a publican in England. In 1943 or 1944, Blue Star re-engaged him as the master of one of the merchant ships for one of the Allied landings in Europe. After this contract, Blue Star did not offer him another ship. He later emigrated to India, where he died shortly after his arrival.

Six of Dunedin Star's crew including an assistant engineer went on to serve on Melbourne Star, and were killed when she sank in the North Atlantic on 2 April 1943. Dunedin Star's chief electrician went on to serve on the landing ship Empire Javelin, and was killed when she sank in the English Channel on 28 December 1944.

Some of Dunedin Star's cargo was salvaged in 1951. Some remains are visible to this day on the beach, among them a section of decking from the bow or of the stern.

== Successor ship ==
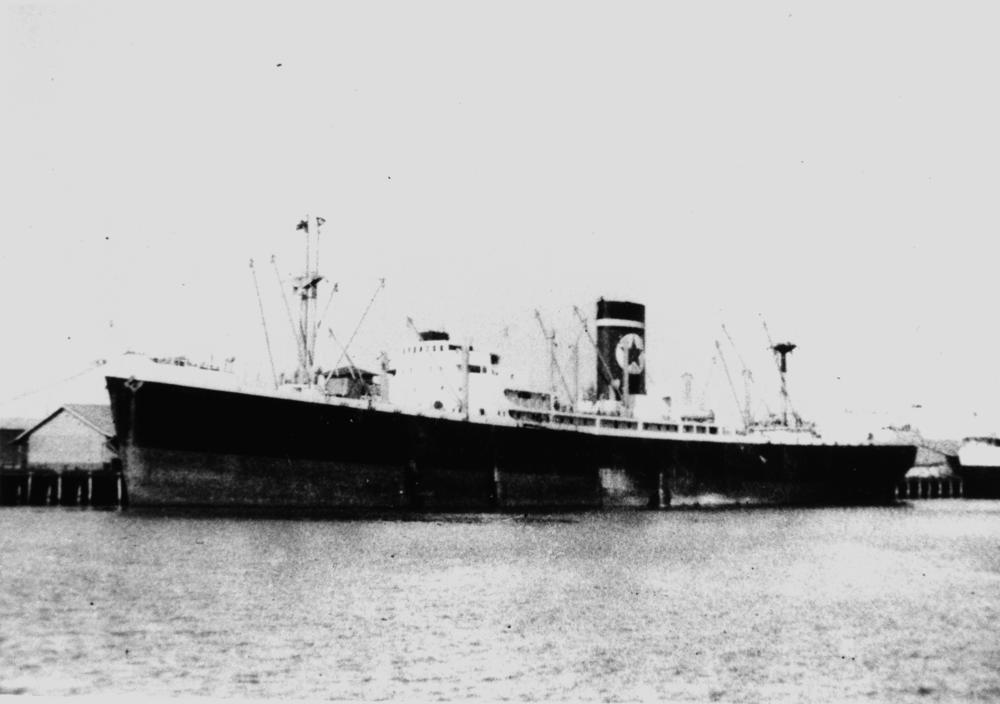
The second Dunedin Star, built in Glasgow in 1950

After the War, Blue Star Line bought a cargo ship that was being built by Alexander Stephen and Sons at Linthouse on the River Clyde. She had been laid down for Lancashire Shipping Ltd as Bolton Castle for trade with China. However, in 1949, the Chinese Communist Revolution reduced this trade so Lancashire Shipping sold her on the stocks to Blue Star.

The new ship was launched on 18 April 1950 as a second Dunedin Star and completed that September. She was a turbine steamship, and at 7,322 GRT was considerably smaller than her predecessor. Unusually for a Blue Star ship, she had only some of her holds refrigerated. Nevertheless, she spent 25 years in service with the Blue Star group.

In 1968, the ship was transferred to the Blue Star subsidiary Lamport and Holt, which renamed her Roland 2. She spent most of the next seven years on a regular route between Río de la Plata, Brazil and the UK. In 1975, she was sold to Pallas Maritime of Cyprus, who renamed her Jessica. After two more changes of the owner, she was scrapped in 1978 at Gadani ship-breaking yard in Pakistan.

== See also ==
- Eduard Bohlen – a German cargo and passenger ship that was wrecked on the Skeleton Coast in 1909

== Sources and further reading ==
- Dawson, Jeff (2005). Dead Reckoning: The Dunedin Star Disaster. Weidenfeld & Nicolson. ISBN 0-7538-2044-7.
- Marsh, John H. (1944). Skeleton Coast (1st ed.). London: Hodder & Stoughton.
- Marsh, John H; Anson, Lyman (1958) [1944]. Skeleton Coast (2nd ed.). London: Hodder & Stoughton.
- Schoeman, Amy (2003). Skeleton Coast. Cape Town, Johnnesburg: Struik. ISBN 1-86872-891-9.
- "Taffrail" (Henry Taprell Dorling) (1973). Blue Star Line at War, 1939–45. London: W. Foulsham & Co. pp. 78, 80, 84, 87, 118–131. ISBN 0-572-00849-X.
- Winchester, S (2010). Atlantic: great sea battles, heroic discoveries, titanic storms, and a vast ocean of a million stories. New York: Harper. ISBN 978-0-06-170258-7.
