= Yona, Namibe =

Yona
- commune
- Location in Angola
- Country: Angola
- Province: Namibe
- Time zone: UTC+1 (WAT)

Yona, also spelled Iona, is a commune of Angola, located in the province of Namibe.

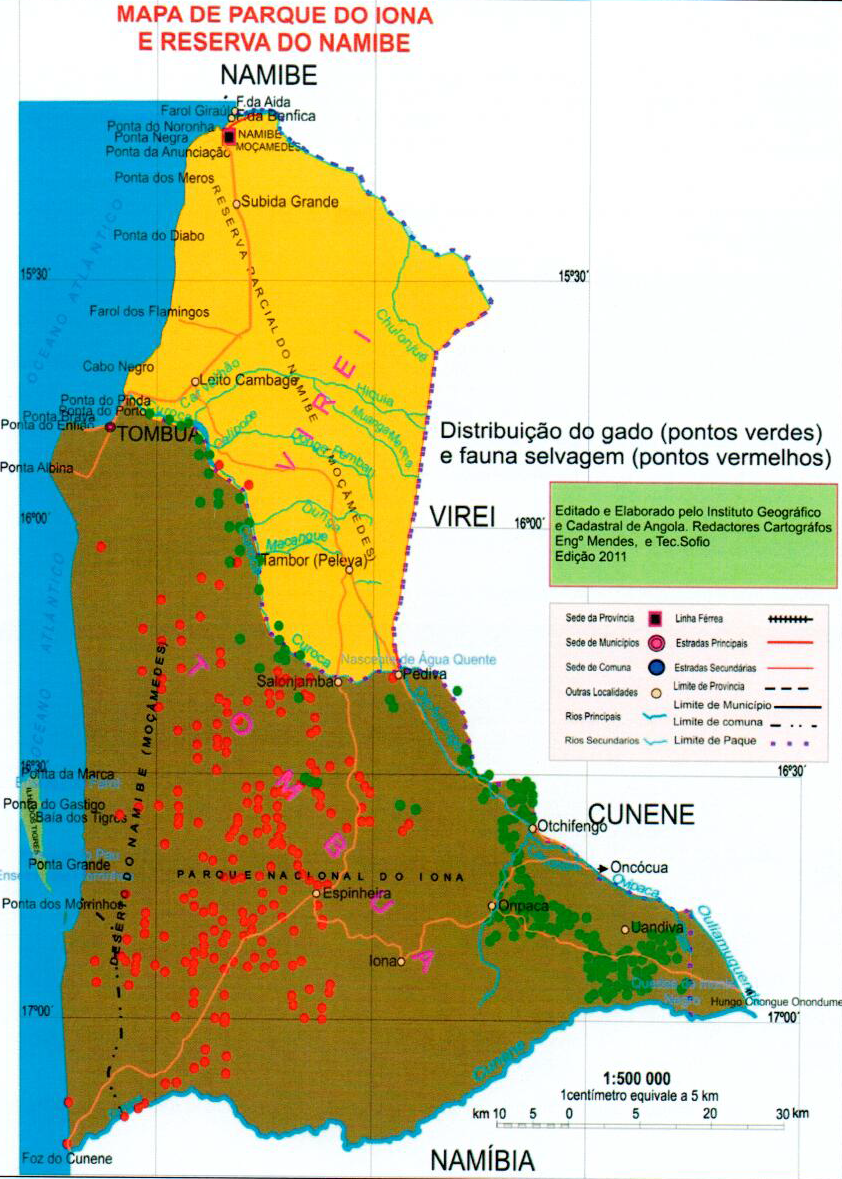
Location of Iona in Iona National Park

== See also ==
- Communes of Angola
- Operation Super
