= Conception Bay (Namibia) =

Bay on the coast of Namibia

- Conceptionbaai (Afrikaans)
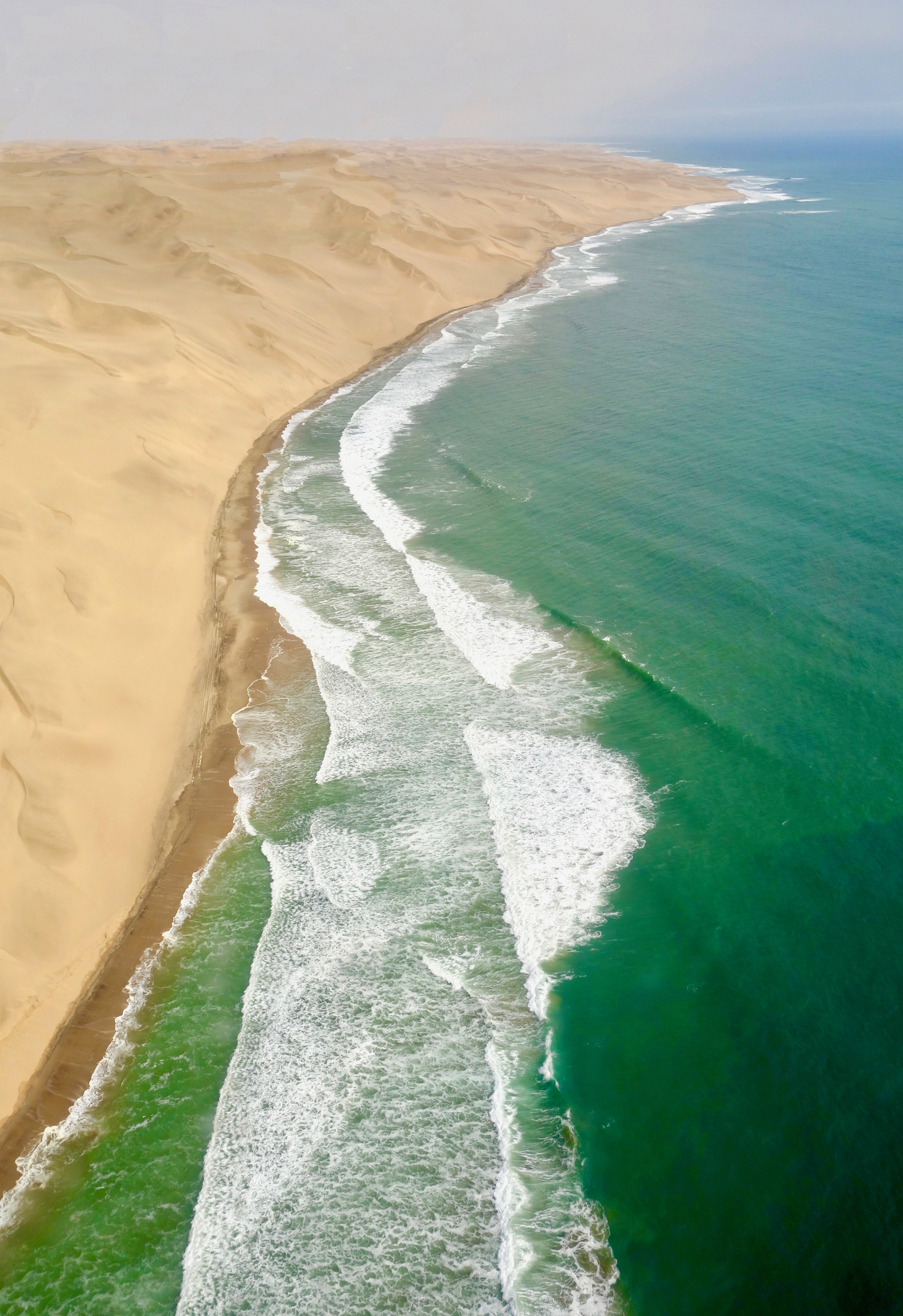

- Location in Namibia
- Coordinates: 23°55′S 14°30′E
- Ocean/sea sources: Atlantic Ocean
- Basin countries: Namibia
- Settlements: None

Conception Bay (Afrikaans: Conceptionbaai, German: Empfängnisbucht) is a bay on the coast of Namibia, Africa. The bay is exposed, thus not providing a useful anchorage.

== Geography ==
Conception Bay opens to the Atlantic Ocean in the northwest. There is a lagoon at the southern edge of its shoreline. The bay is located in a desolate area. It is part of one of the coastal stretches of Namibia where diamonds are found.

== Shipwrecks ==
On 30 July 1926, the cargo ship SS Cawdor Castle, operating under the flag of the United Kingdom, ran aground in Conception Bay. She broke up over the following weeks and was a complete wreck by early September.

== See also ==
- Geography of Namibia
- Eduard Bohlen
