= Skeleton Coast =

Atlantic coast of northern Namibia and southern Angola

- Coast
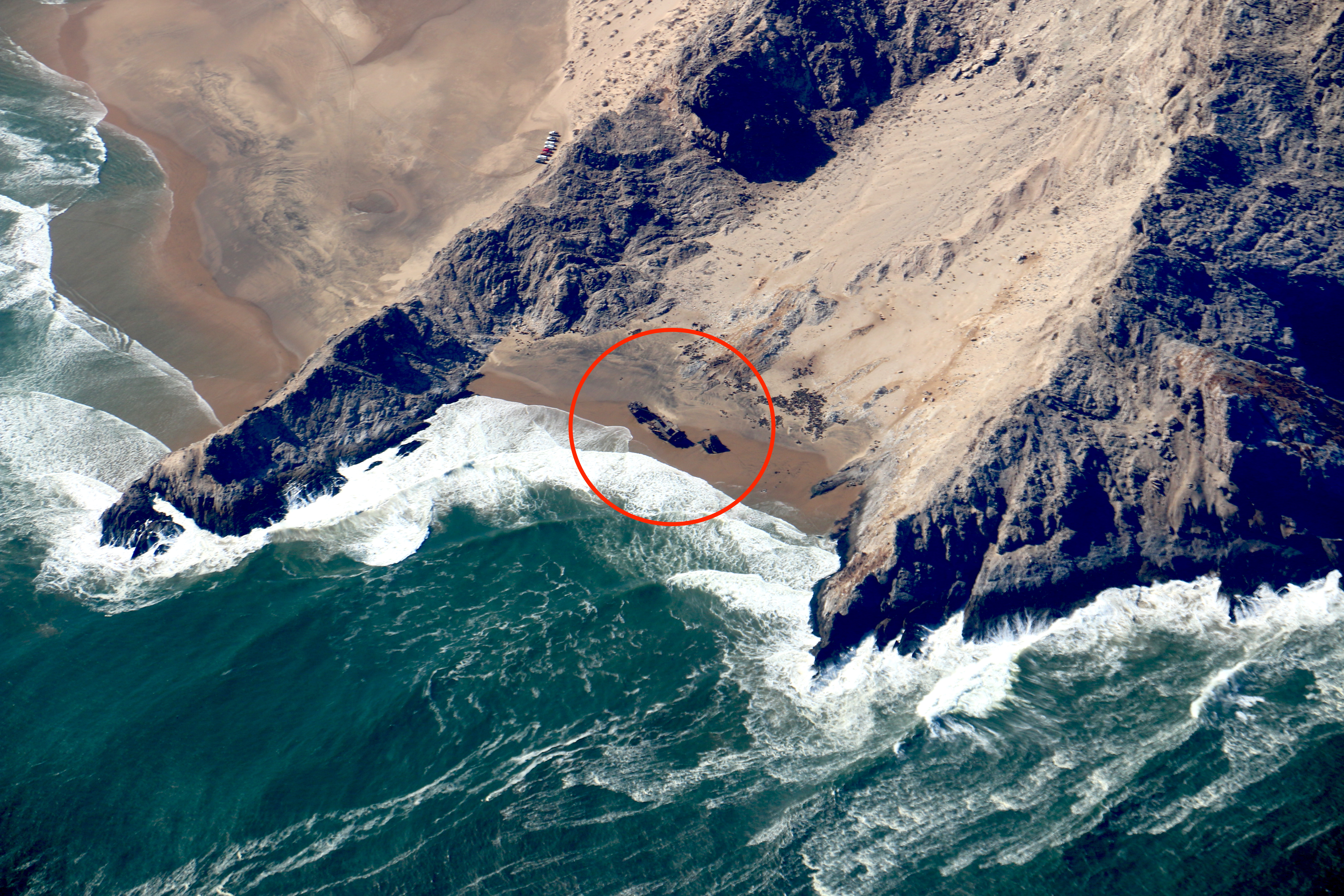
- Otavi, shipwrecked 1945
- Interactive map of Skeleton Coast
- Coordinates: 21°36′44″S 14°32′24″E
- Location: Namibia
- Part of: Namib Desert coast
- Water bodies: Atlantic Ocean, Kunene River, Swakop River
- Etymology: Named for whale and seal bones that used to litter the coast, partly due to whaling, and for the thousands of shipwrecks

Dimensions
  - Length: 310 miles (500 km)

The Skeleton Coast is the northern part of the Atlantic coast of Namibia. Immediately south of Angola, it stretches from the Kunene River to the Swakop River, although the name is sometimes used to describe the entire Namib Desert coast. The indigenous San people (formerly known as Bushmen), of the Namibian interior called the region "The Land God Made in Anger", while Portuguese sailors once referred to it as "The Gates of Hell".

On the coast, the upwelling of the cold Benguela current gives rise to dense ocean fogs (called cassimbo by the Angolans) for much of the year. The winds blow from land to sea, rainfall rarely exceeds 10 millimetres (0.39 in) annually, and the climate is highly inhospitable. There is a constant, heavy surf on the beaches. In the days before engine-powered ships and boats, it was possible to get ashore through the surf, but difficult to launch from the shore. The only way out was by going inland over a hot and arid desert.

The coast is largely made up of soft sand occasionally interrupted by rocky outcrops. The southern section consists of gravel plains, while north of Terrace Bay the landscape is dominated by high sand dunes.

Skeleton Bay is known as a great location for surfing.

== Etymology ==
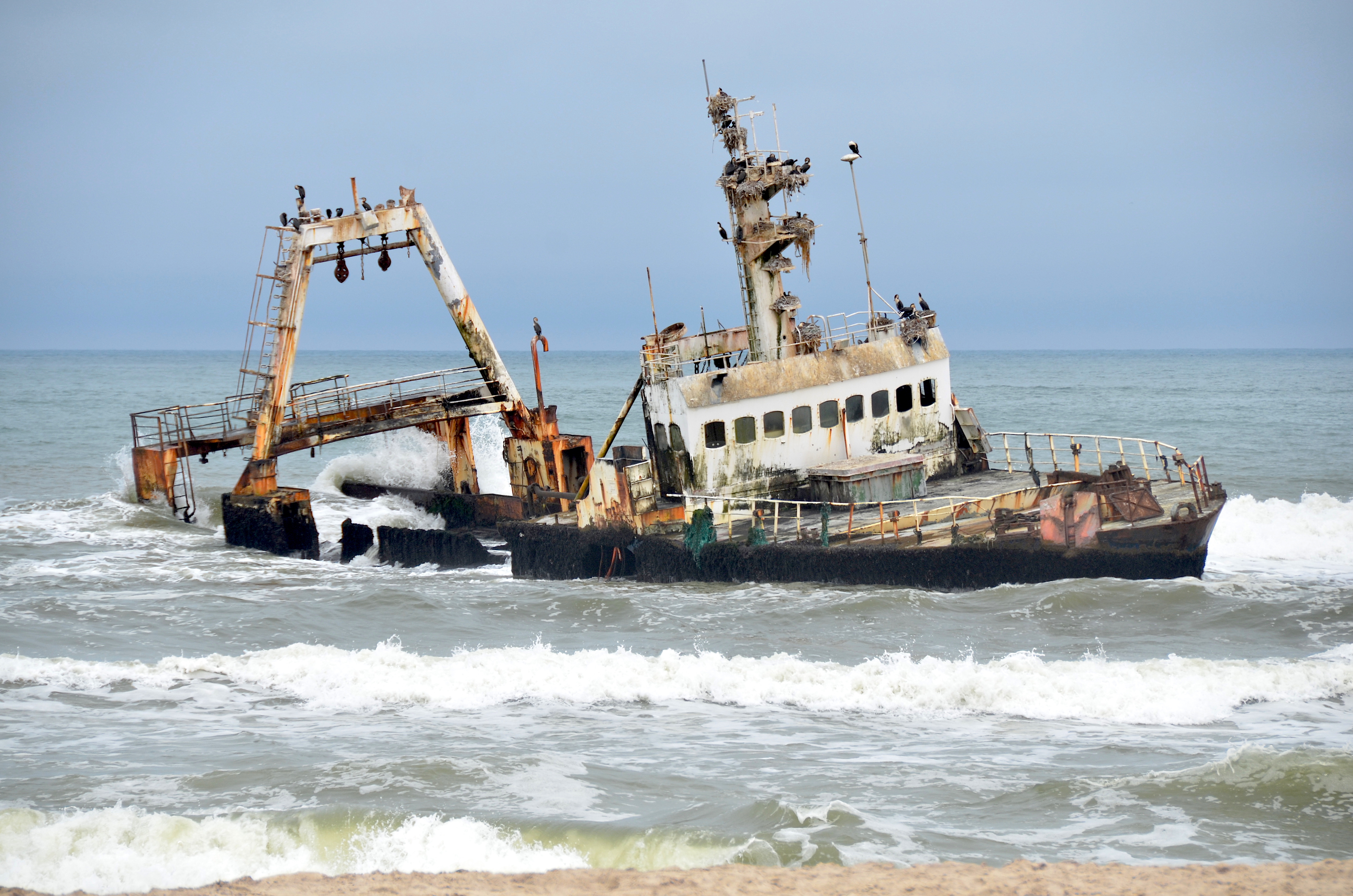
Zeila India shipwreck, south of Henties Bay, November 2014

The area's name derives from the whale and seal bones that once littered the shore, partly due to the whaling industry, although in modern times the coast also harbours the skeletal remains of the shipwrecks caused by offshore rocks and fog. Hundreds of vessels of various sizes litter the coast, notably the Eduard Bohlen, Benguela Eagle, Otavi, Dunedin Star and Tong Taw.

The name "Skeleton Coast" was coined by John Henry Marsh as the title for the book he wrote chronicling the shipwreck of the Dunedin Star. Since the book was first published in 1944, it has become so well known that the coast is now generally referred to as "Skeleton Coast" and is named so on most maps today. See § In popular culture, below.

== History ==
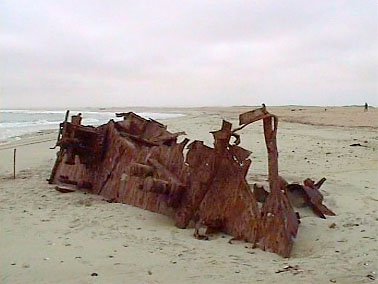
One of many rusting ship hulls along the Skeleton Coast (Dunedin Star)

One of the oldest shipwrecks in the Skeleton Coast region is that of the Bom Jesus, near the town of Oranjemund. It ran aground during the 1530s and is known to be one of the oldest discovered shipwrecks of the Iberian Atlantic tradition in Sub-Saharan Africa.

Past human occupation by Strandlopers is shown by shell middens of white mussels found along parts of the Skeleton Coast.

In 1942 the British refrigerated cargo liner Dunedin Star ran aground. All her 106 passengers and crew were eventually rescued, but at the cost of a tug, an SAAF aircraft and the lives of two rescuers. The account is recorded in a book Skeleton Coast by John Henry Marsh.

On Thursday, 22 March 2018, a Japanese registered fishing vessel, MVF Fukuseki Maru, got into trouble and ran aground near Durissa Bay, south of the Ugab River mouth, lying 2 km from the Skeleton Coast beach in the ocean. All 24 foreign crew members were rescued by Namibian authorities.

== Wildlife ==
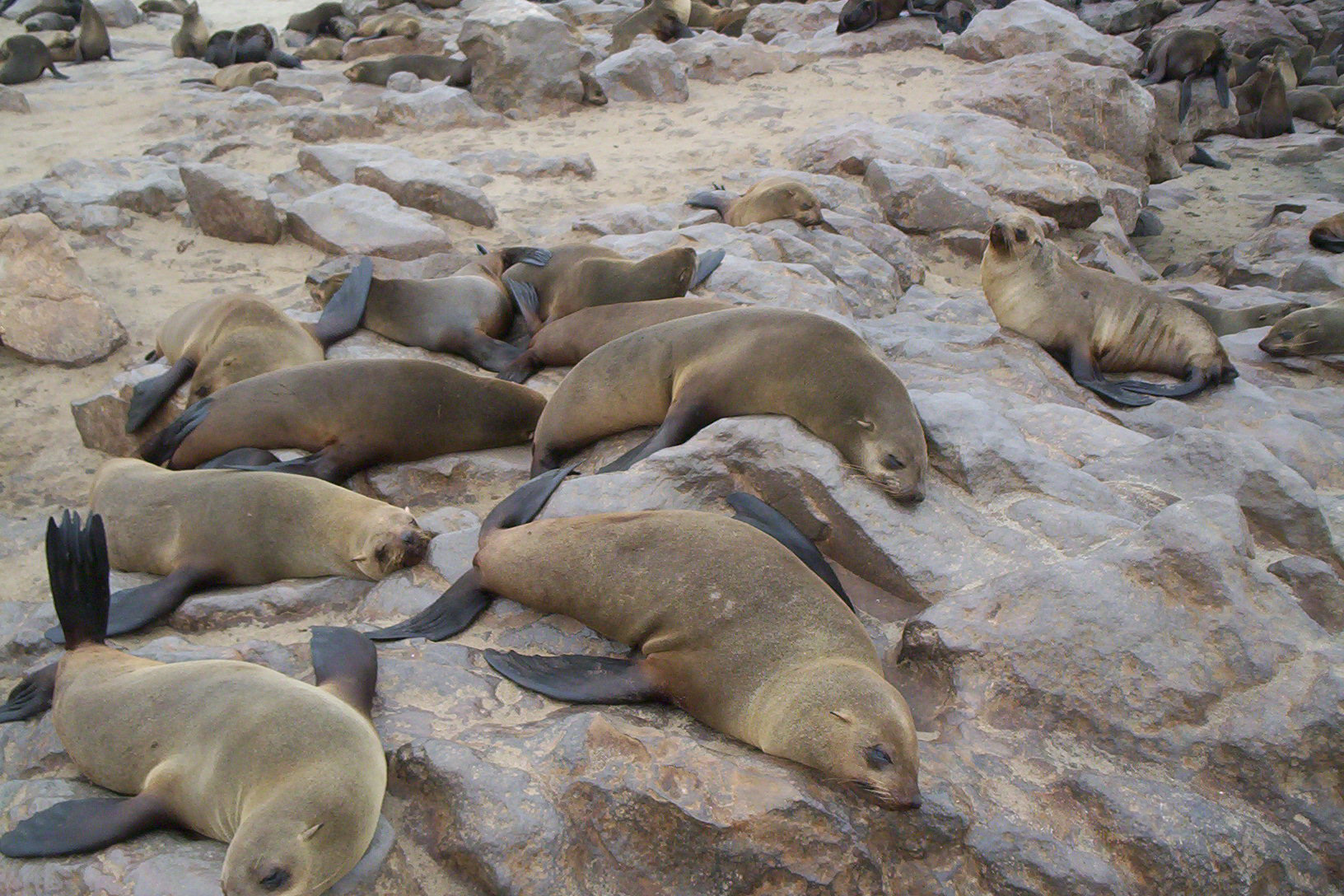
Brown fur seal colony on Skeleton Coast.

Namibia has declared the 16,000 square kilometres (6,200 sq mi) area of coastline and adjacent deserts, scrub and marshlands as Skeleton Coast National Park, from the Ugab River to the Kunene. The northern half of the park is a designated wilderness area. Notable features are the clay castles of the Hoarusib River, the Agate Mountain salt pans, and the large brown fur seal colonies at Cape Fria. The remainder of the coast is the National West Coast Recreation Area. The national park is part of the Iona – Skeleton Coast Transfrontier Conservation Area.

The coast has been the subject of a number of wildlife documentaries, particularly concerning adaptations to extreme aridity, such as the 1965 National Geographic documentary Survivors of the Skeleton Coast. Many of the native species of succulent plants depend on the thick sea fogs, which roll-in from the coast, for their moisture; in addition to water droplets for their hydration, windblown detritus from the arid interior serves as a food source for numerous invertebrates, which, in turn, feed the herpetofauna and form the base of the desert food chain. The desert bird assemblages have been studied in terms of their thermoregulation, coloration, breeding strategies and nomadism.

The riverbeds and flatlands further away from the beaches are home to bush elephants, Chacma baboons, southern giraffe, lions, leopard, black rhinoceros, spotted and brown hyenas, gemsbok and springbok, among many other species. The animals get most of their water from wells dug by one another, in addition to consuming various water-laden succulent plants. The black rhinoceros population was the main reason why the CBBC show Serious Desert was filmed in the region.

== In popular culture ==
- Skeleton Coast is a novel by Clive Cussler that uses the shifting sands of the coastline as a prominent plot device in the fourth entry in the Oregon Files.
- The plot of the 1968 fiction film A Twist of Sand involves diamonds hidden in a shipwreck buried in the sand dunes of the Skeleton Coast.
- Much of season 1, episode 7 of Amazon's The Grand Tour was filmed on the Skeleton Coast.
- The first episode of Wonders of the Universe featured the Skeleton Coast, and the shipwrecks there were utilized as part of an analogy by Brian Cox to demonstrate the effects of time.
- For the American TV series Fallout, scenes depicting the post-apocalyptic Wasteland were filmed on the Skeleton Coast.
- Drummer Billy Cobham has written an album inspired by his visit to the area, called Tales from the Skeleton Coast.
- Punk rock band The Lawrence Arms released their seventh LP, Skeleton Coast, named in reference to the region.
- Lions of the Skeleton Coast, a Nature (TV program), (season 26, episode 5), follows three lion cubs surviving along the Skeleton Coast of Namibia.

Gallery
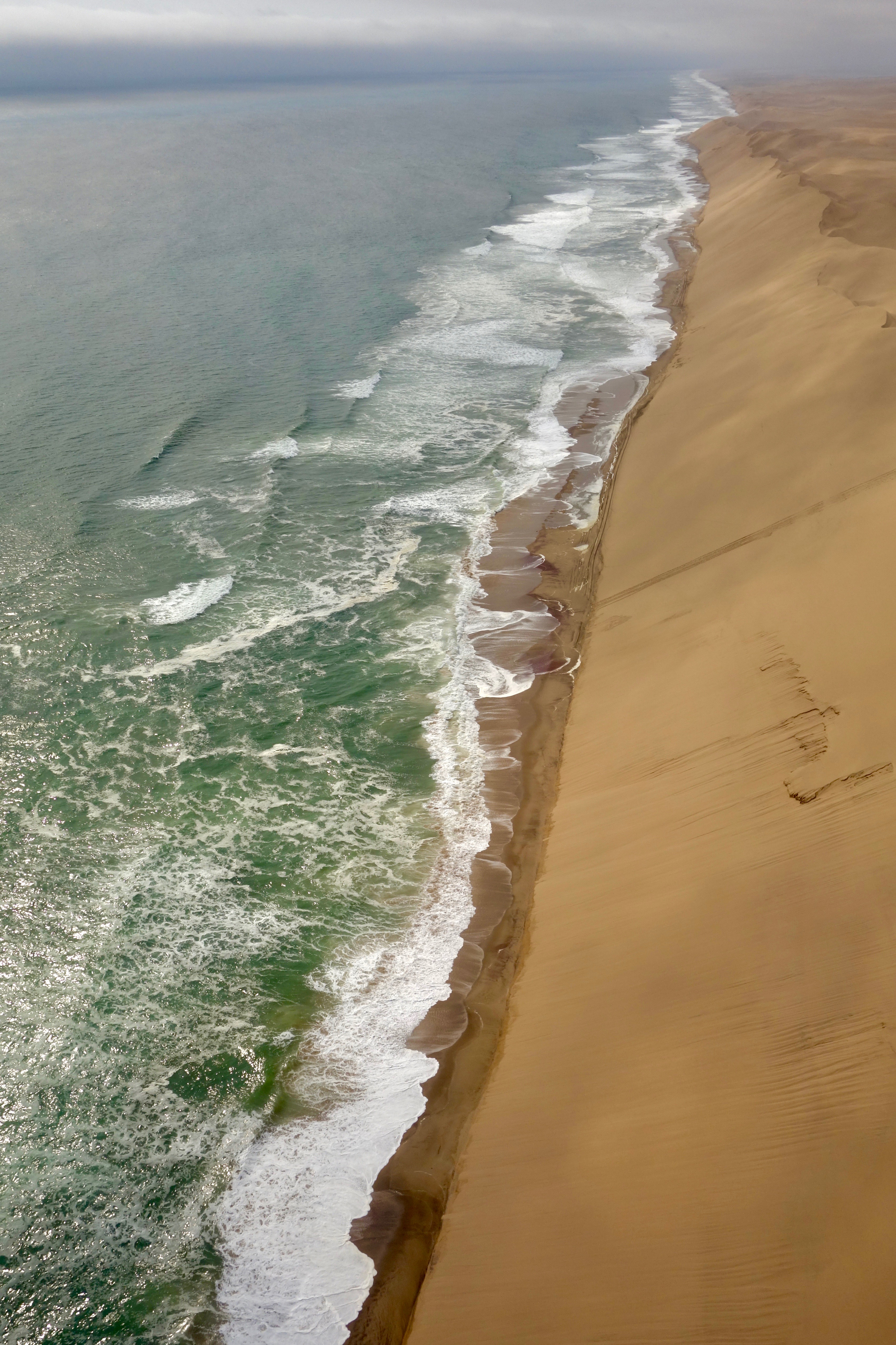
An aerial view of Skeleton Coast

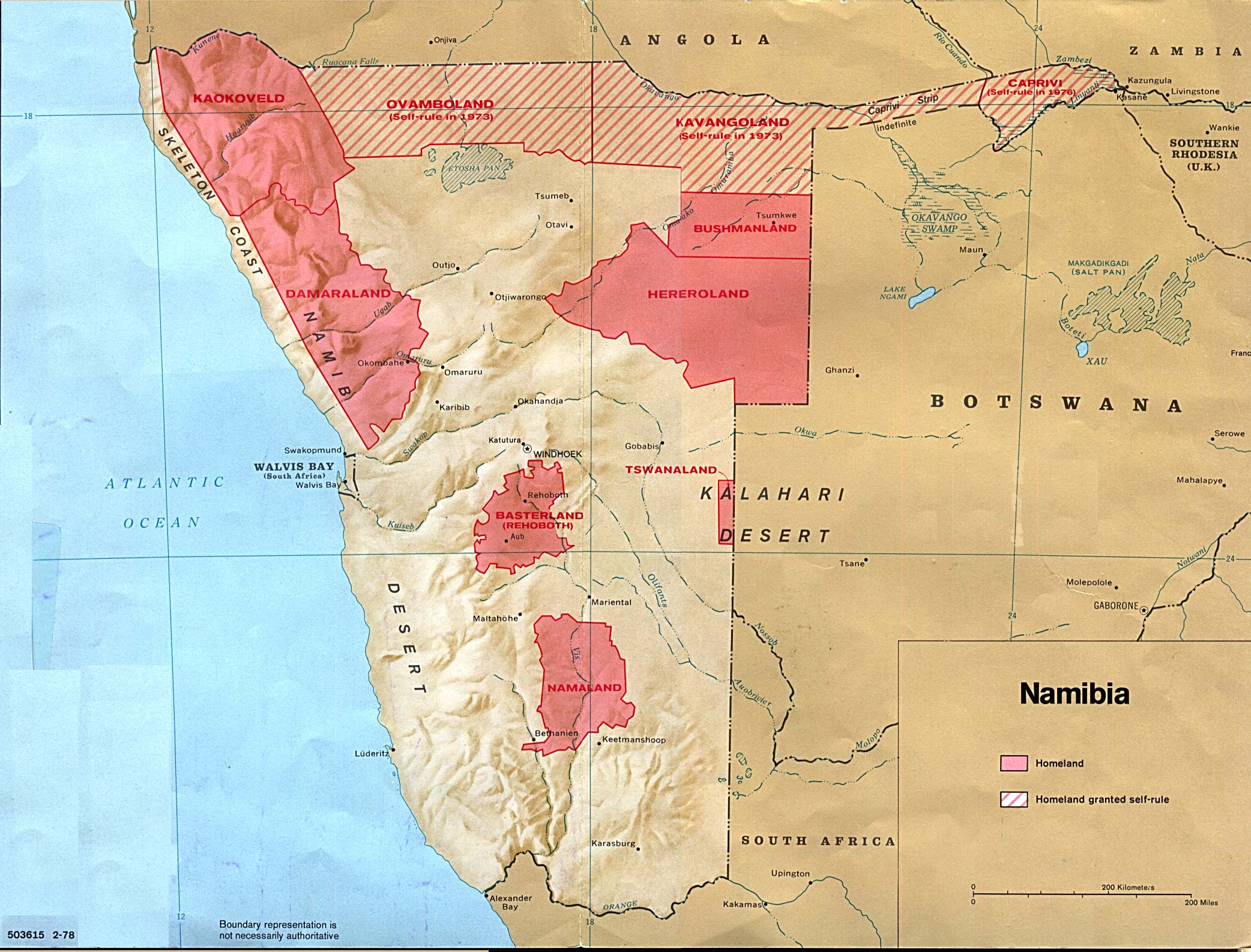
A map from 1964 to 1965 showing the Namibian "homelands" or Bantustans when Namibia was under the rule of apartheid South Africa.

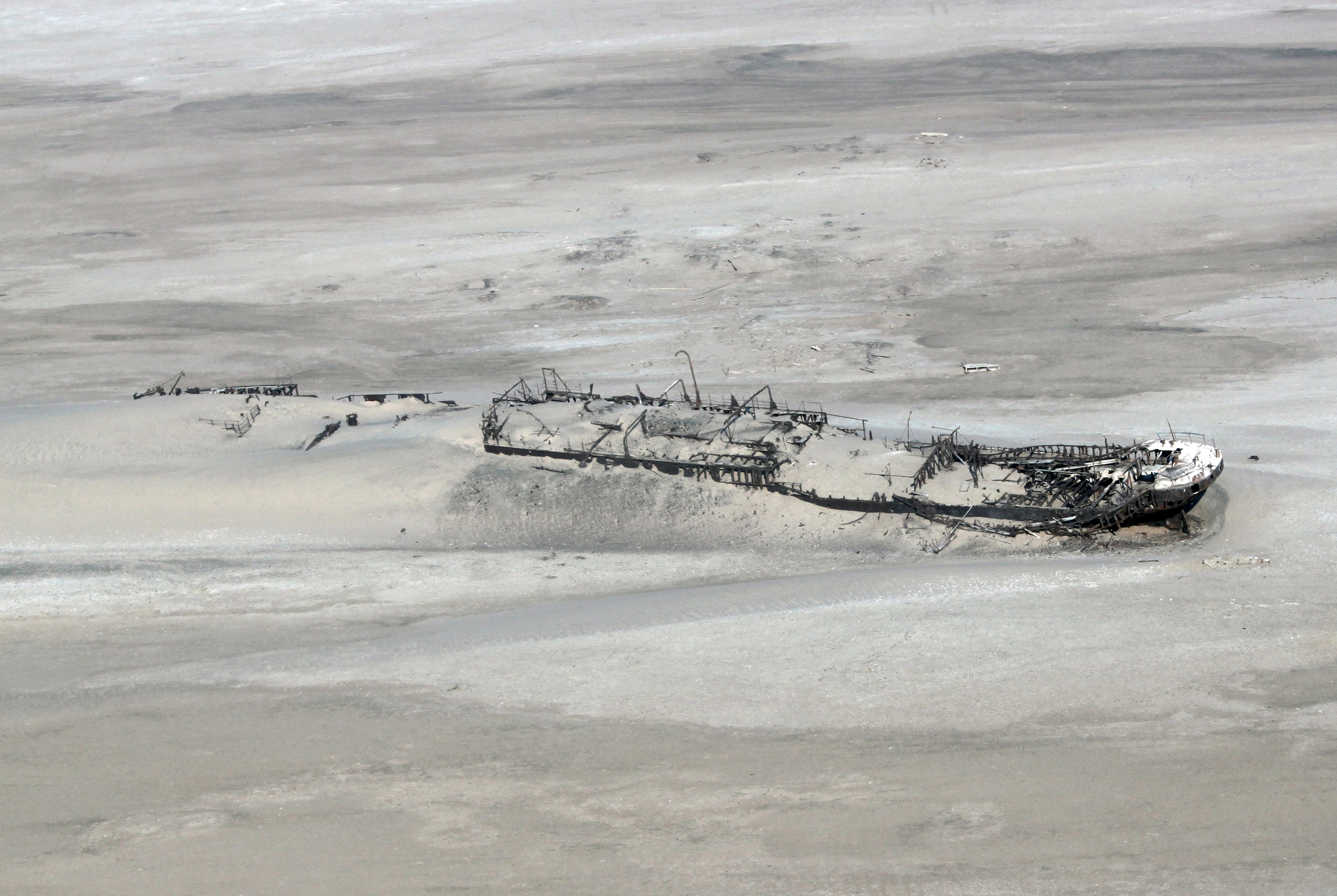
Shipwreck of Eduard Bohlen

Ugabmund Gate (Ugab River Gate) of the Skeleton Coast National Park; note the skulls-and-crossbones in the gate

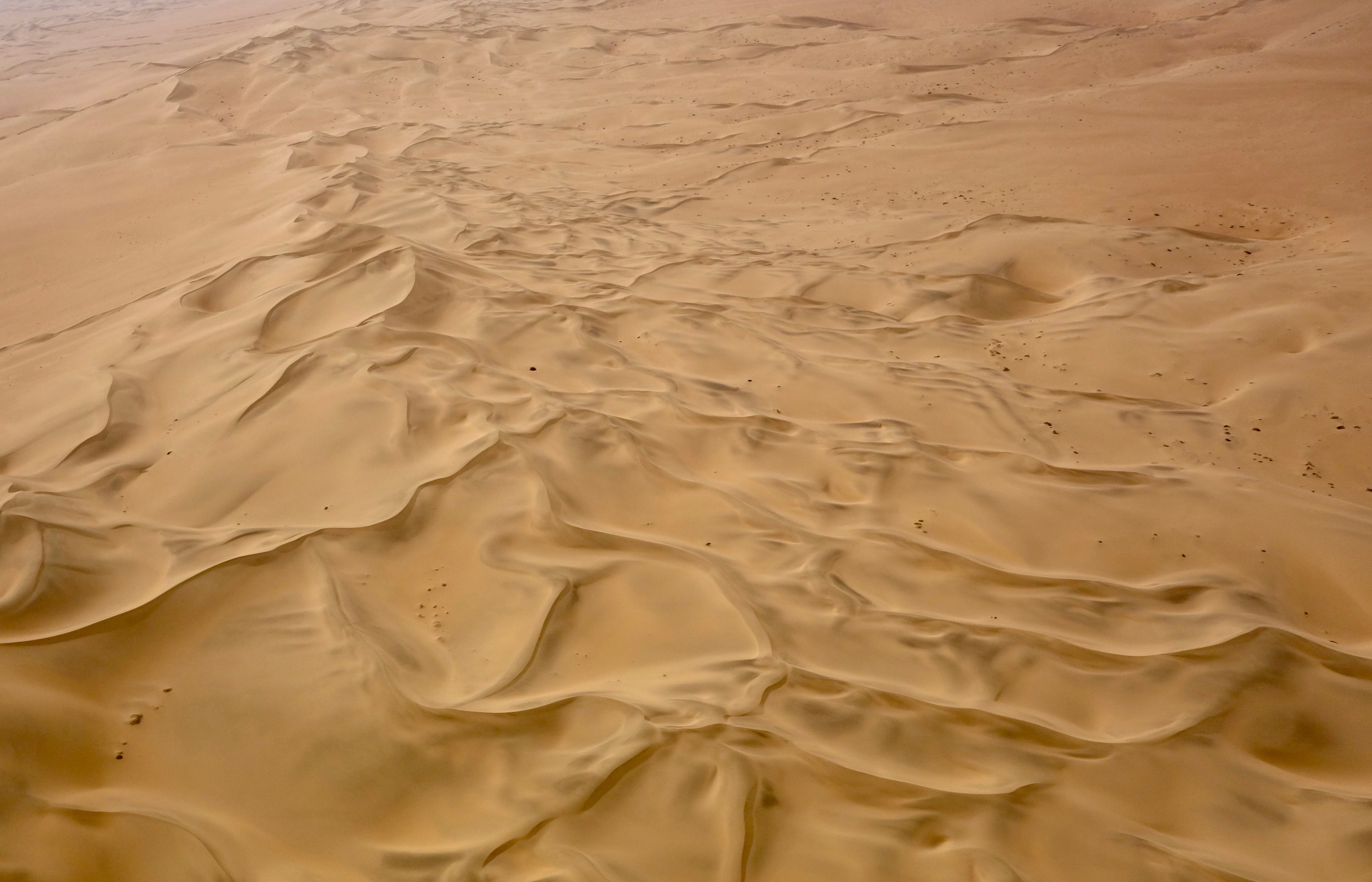
A dune formation on the coastline
