= Ehirovipuka Conservancy =

Ehirovipuka Conservancy is a nature reserve situated in the Kunene Region of Namibia, which received a 20-year tourism concession in 2010. Animals living there include Angolan giraffes, Chapman's zebras, and lions. It contains a meat processing plant supplying tourist lodges. Other economic activities include forestry and the sale of traditional craft products.
