= Iona – Skeleton Coast Transfrontier Conservation Area =

Conservation area spanning Angola and Namibia

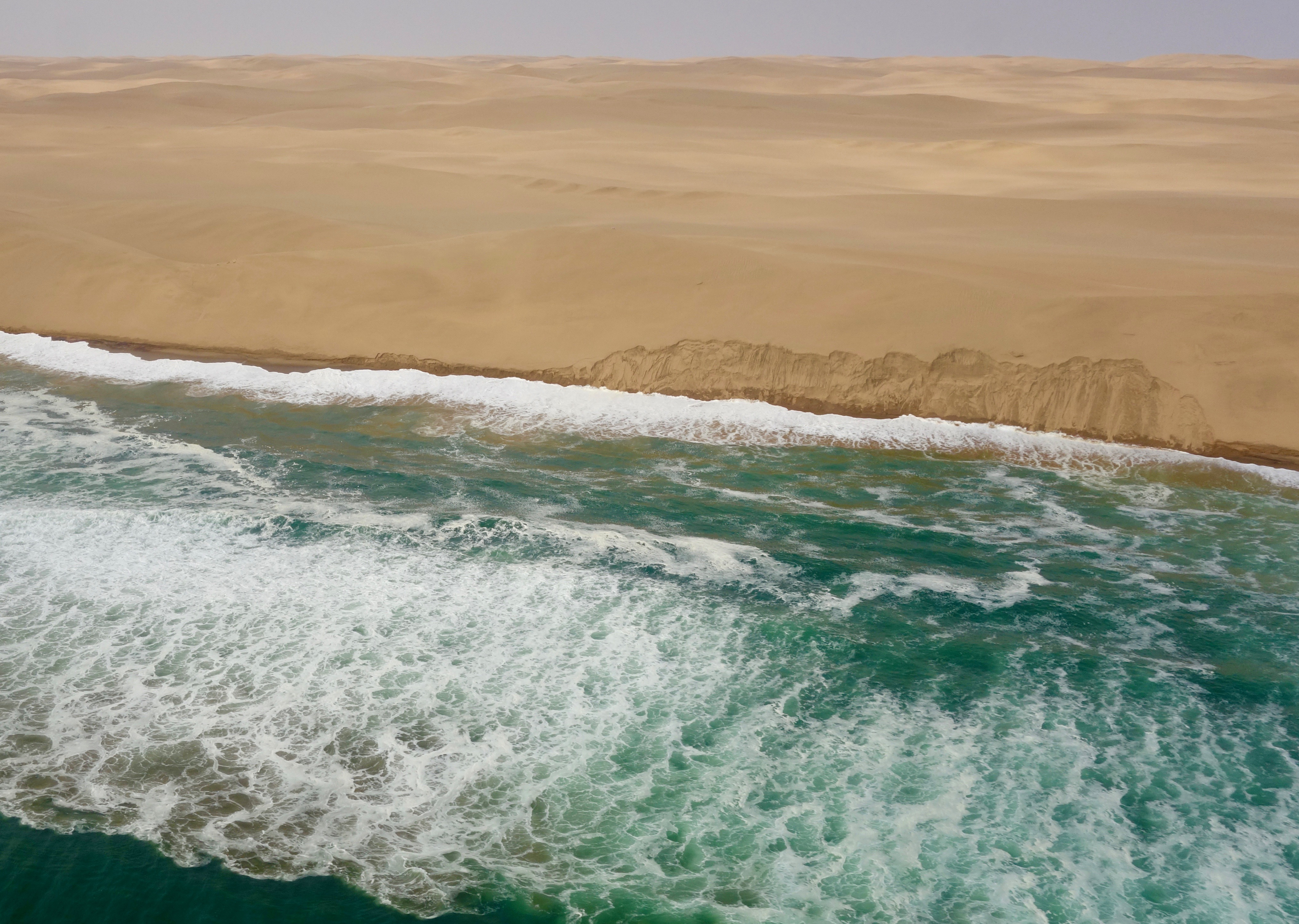
- Coastal sand dunes in Skeleton Coast National Park
- Location: Angola and Namibia
- Area: 47,698 ha (184.16 sq mi)
- Website: sciona.nust.na

The Iona–Skeleton Coast Transfrontier Conservation Area is a transfrontier conservation area. It encompasses Iona National Park and Namibe Partial Reserve in Angola and Skeleton Coast National Park in Namibia, making it one of the largest in the world. The two countries share a common boundary along the Cunene River, which is where Iona and Skeleton Coast also meet. The Namibe Partial Reserve is north of Iona and shares a border along the Curoca River.

The Memorandum of Agreement for the transfrontier area was signed on May 3, 2018.

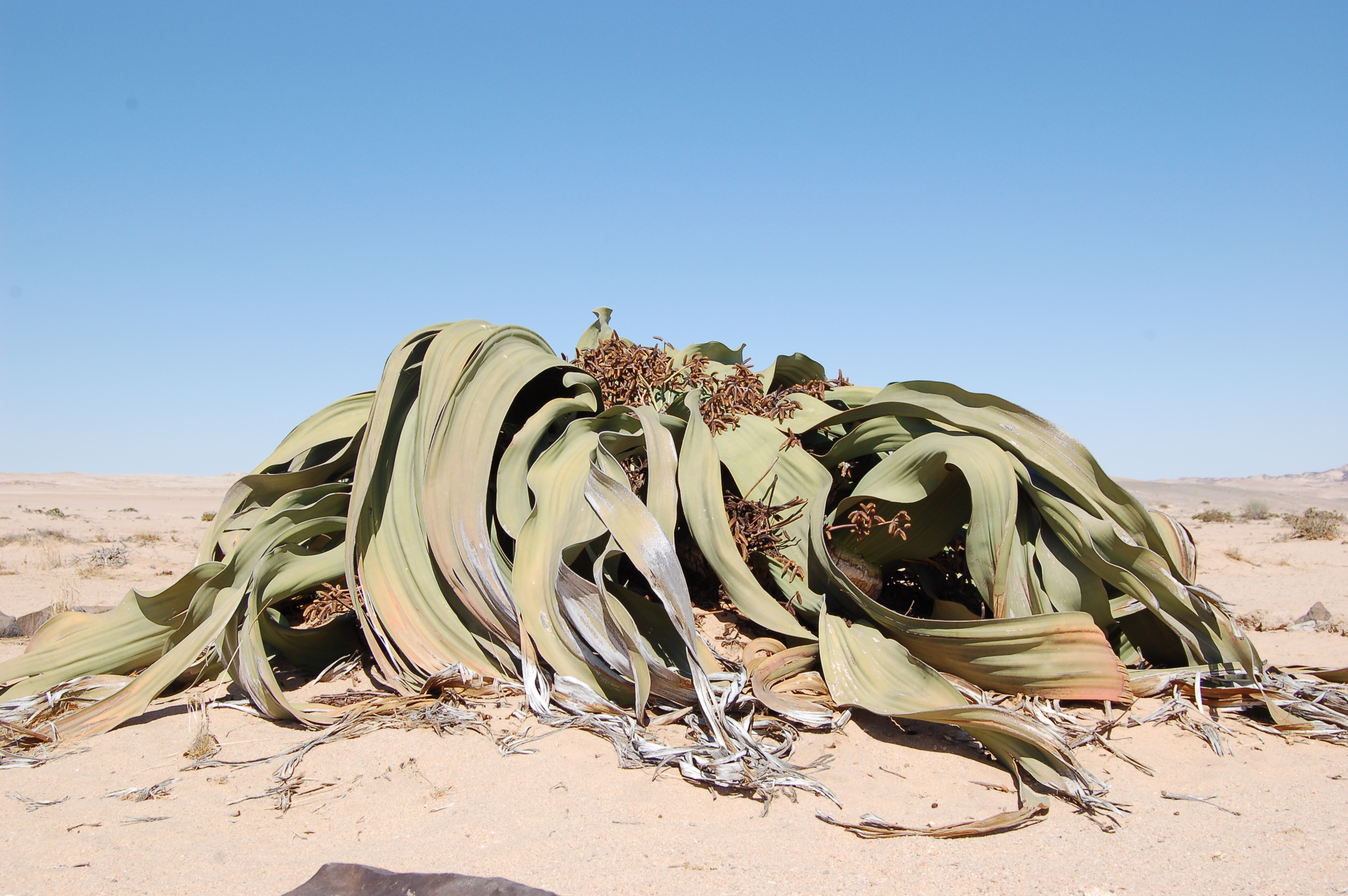
The Welwitschia mirabilis can live thousands of years

The area is important for migration across the region, protection of the Cunene River ecosystem, as well as shielding the Welwitschia mirabillis plants. It includes at least 90% of the world population of Desert plated lizards. Other animals include black-faced impala, desert elephants, and black rhinoceros.

The area has dunes, plains, and rough mountains. It also has a 1 km wide stretch of the Atlantic Ocean.

A potential expansion, called the Three Nations Namib Desert Transfrontier Conservation Area (TNND TFCA), would include the ǀAi-ǀAis/Richtersveld Transfrontier Park to the south.

== See also ==
- List of national parks of Namibia
- List of protected areas in Angola
