= Curoca River =

- Location in Angola

Location
- Country: Angola

Physical characteristics
- Mouth
  - coordinates: 15°43′30″S 11°54′39″E

The Curoca is an intermittent river in Namibe Province, southern Angola which has residual lagoons in dry seasons. It is one of only two rivers in Iona National Park, which also includes moving sand dunes of the Namib Desert. The Curoca forms part of the northern border of the park and also runs through the Lagoa dos Arcos and the Regional Natural Park of Namibe (Parque Natural Regional do Namibe). Its mouth is at the Atlantic Ocean, north of the community of Tômbwa. The lagoons support plants including bamboo and thorn trees and animals such as springbok and oryx. Lagoa dos Arcos oasis is noted as a tourist destination. The seasonal flooding of the river supports the limited agriculture and grazing conducted in the area.

A San group who live near the river and spoke a language called Curoca but the language is now considered extinct. The members of the group have adopted a Bantu language.

== See also ==
- Kuroka, a municipality in Kunene Province
- List of rivers of Angola
