= Cape Cross =

Headland in western Namibia

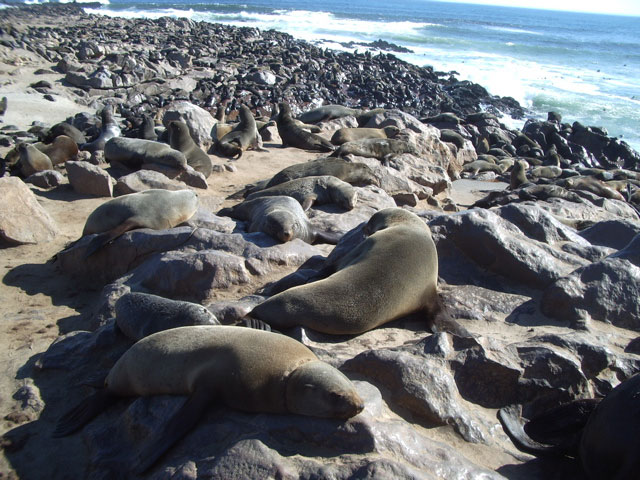
- Cape Cross Cape fur seal colony

- Location within Namibia
- Location: Erongo Region, Namibia
- Coordinates: 21°46′22″S 13°57′03″E
- Governing body: Ministry of Environment and Tourism

Cape Cross (Afrikaans: Kaap Kruis; German: Kreuzkap; Portuguese: Cabo da Cruz) is a headland in the South Atlantic in Skeleton Coast, western Namibia.

== History ==
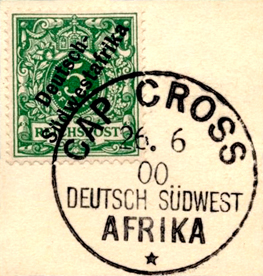
Stamps for German South West Africa postmarked Cap Cross 1900

In 1484, Portuguese navigator and explorer Diogo Cão was ordered by King John II of Portugal to advance south into undiscovered regions along the west coast of Africa, as part of the search for a sea route to India and the Spice Islands. While doing so, he was to choose some particularly salient points and claim them for Portugal by erecting stone crosses called padrões. During his first voyage, thought to have taken place in 1482, he reached a place he called Monte Negro, now called Cabo de Santa Maria, roughly 150 km southwest of today's Benguela, Angola.

During his second voyage, in 1484–1486, Cão reached Cape Cross in January 1486, being the first European to visit this area. He is known to have erected two padrões in the areas beyond his first voyage, one in Monte Negro, and the second at Cape Cross. The current name of the place is derived from this padrão. What can today be found at Cape Cross are two replicas of that first cross.

== Padrão ==
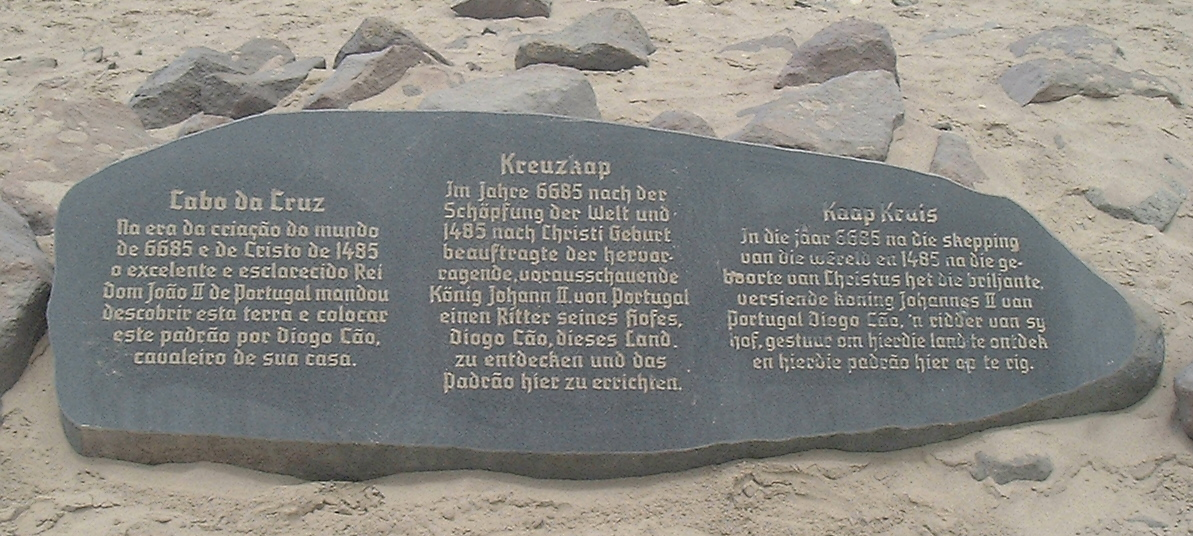
Cape Cross inscription, modern copy at site

The original Cape Cross padrão was removed in 1893 by Corvette captain Gottlieb Becker, commander of the unprotected cruiser SMS Falke of the German Navy, and taken to Berlin. The cross is now held in the Deutsches Historisches Museum. A simple wooden cross was put in its place. The wooden cross was replaced two years later by a stone replica.

At the end of the 20th century, thanks to private donations, another cross, more similar to the original one, was erected at the cape along with the first replica. The inscription on the padrão reads, in English translation:

In the year 6685 after the creation of the world and 1485 after the birth of Christ, the brilliant, far-sighted King John II of Portugal ordered Diogo Cão, knight of his court, to discover this land and to erect this padrão here".

== Seal reserve ==
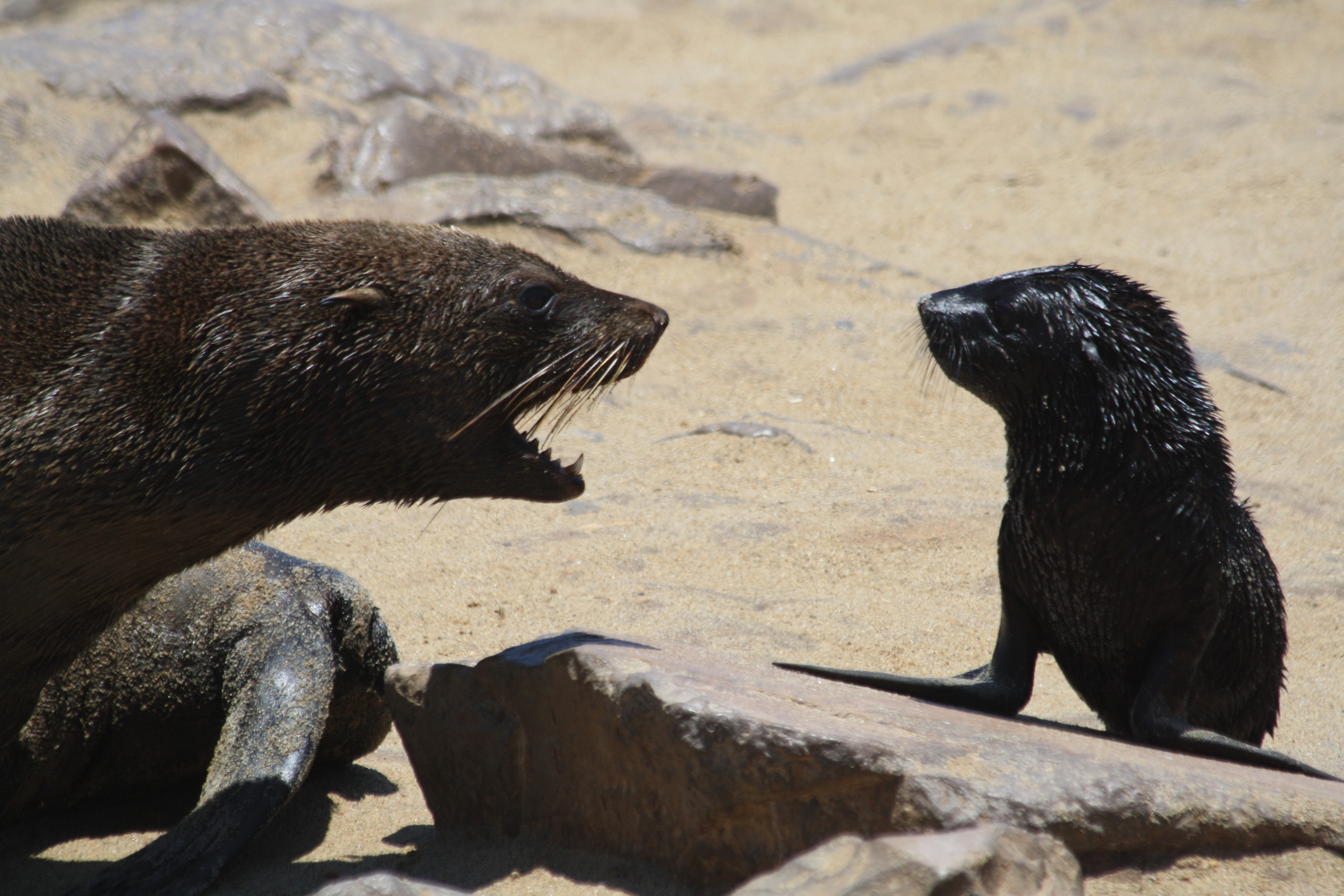
A confrontation at the Cape Cross seal colony

Cape Cross is a protected area proclaimed in the early 1960s. Today it owned by the government of Namibia under the name Cape Cross Seal Reserve. The reserve is the home of one of the largest colonies of Cape fur seals in the world.

Cape Cross is one of two main sites in Namibia (the other is in Lüderitz) where seals are culled, partly for selling their hides and partly for protecting the fish stock. The economic impact of seals on the fish resources is controversial: while a government-initiated study found that seal colonies consume more fish than the entire fishing industry can catch, animal protection society Seal Alert South Africa estimated less than 0.3% losses to commercial fisheries.
