= Skeleton Coast National Park =

National park located on the northwest coast of Namibia

- IUCN category II (national park)
- Location within Namibia
- Location: Northwest Namibia
- Coordinates: 19°11′S 12°43′E
- Area: 16,845 km^{2} (6,504 sq mi)
- Established: 1971

Map of protected areas of Namibia; Skeleton Coast National Park in northwest Namibia

Skeleton Coast National Park is a national park located in northwest Namibia, and has the most inaccessible shores, dotted with shipwrecks. The park was established in 1971 and has a size of 16,845 km^{2} (6,504 sq mi). The park is divided into a northern and southern section, the southern section is open to those with 4-wheel drive vehicles, they are allowed to go up (north) as far as the Ugab River Gate (where a sign with a skull and crossbones warns you to go no further). The northern section can only be reached by a fly-in safari, and the area is off-limits to all vehicles.

The list of tourist attractions in the park includes a shipwreck at the South West Seal viewpoint, Huab lagoon and the collapsed oil drilling rig.

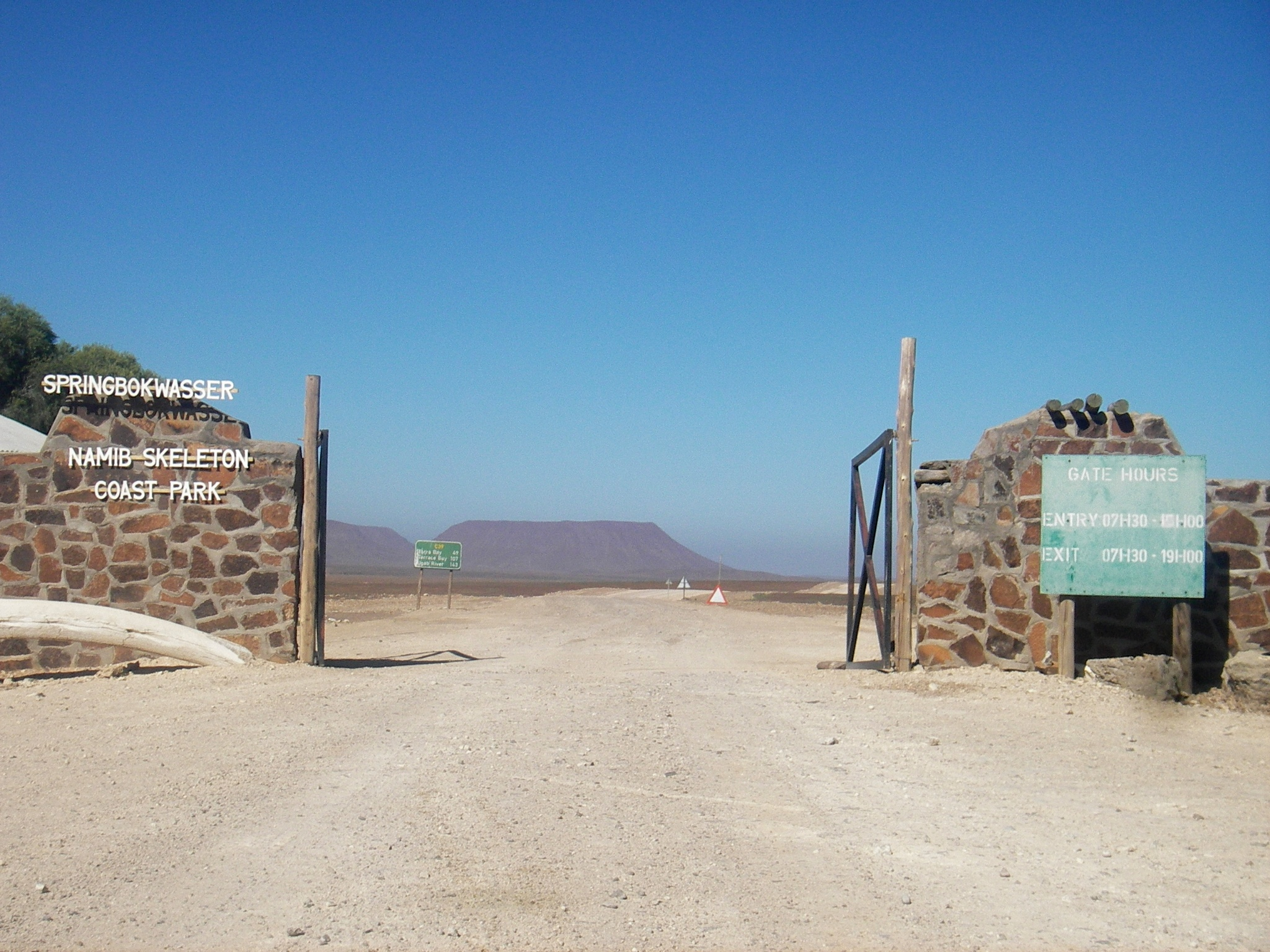
Springbok Gate, the eastern entry

Ugabmund Gate (Ugab River Gate), the southern entry

Collapsed oil drilling rig

== See also ==
- List of national parks of Namibia
- Skeleton Coast

== Notes ==
The park is part of the Iona – Skeleton Coast Transfrontier Conservation Area.
