= Outline of Namibia =

Country in Southern Africa

The Flag of Namibia

The Coat of arms of Namibia

The location of Namibia

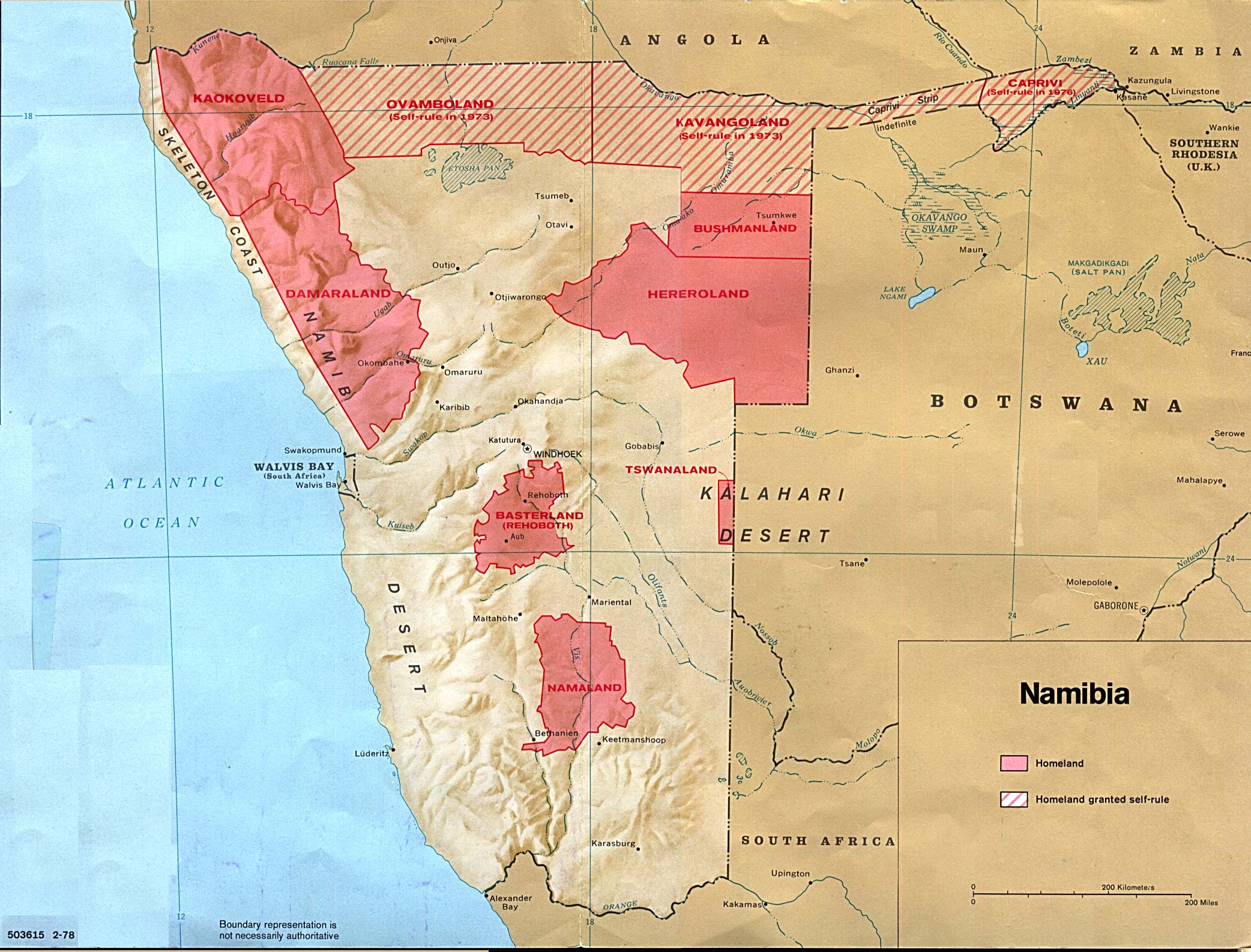
An enlargeable relief map of the Republic of Namibia

The following outline is provided as an overview of and topical guide to Namibia:

Namibia – sovereign country located along the Atlantic Coast of Southern Africa. Namibia shares borders with Angola and Zambia to the north, Botswana to the east, and South Africa to the south. It gained independence from South Africa in 1990 and its capital city is Windhoek (German: Windhuk). Namibia is a member state of the United Nations (UN), the Southern African Development Community (SADC), the African Union (AU), and the Commonwealth of Nations. It is named after the Namib Desert.

== General reference ==
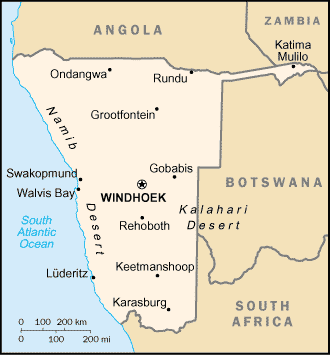
An enlargeable basic map of Namibia

- Pronunciation: /nəˈmɪbiə/
- Common English country name: Namibia
- Official English country name: The Republic of Namibia
- Common endonym(s):
- Official endonym(s):
- Adjectival(s): Namibian
- Demonym(s): Namibian
- International rankings of Namibia
- ISO country codes: NA, NAM, 516
- ISO region codes: See ISO 3166-2:NA
- Internet country code top-level domain: .na

== Geography of Namibia ==
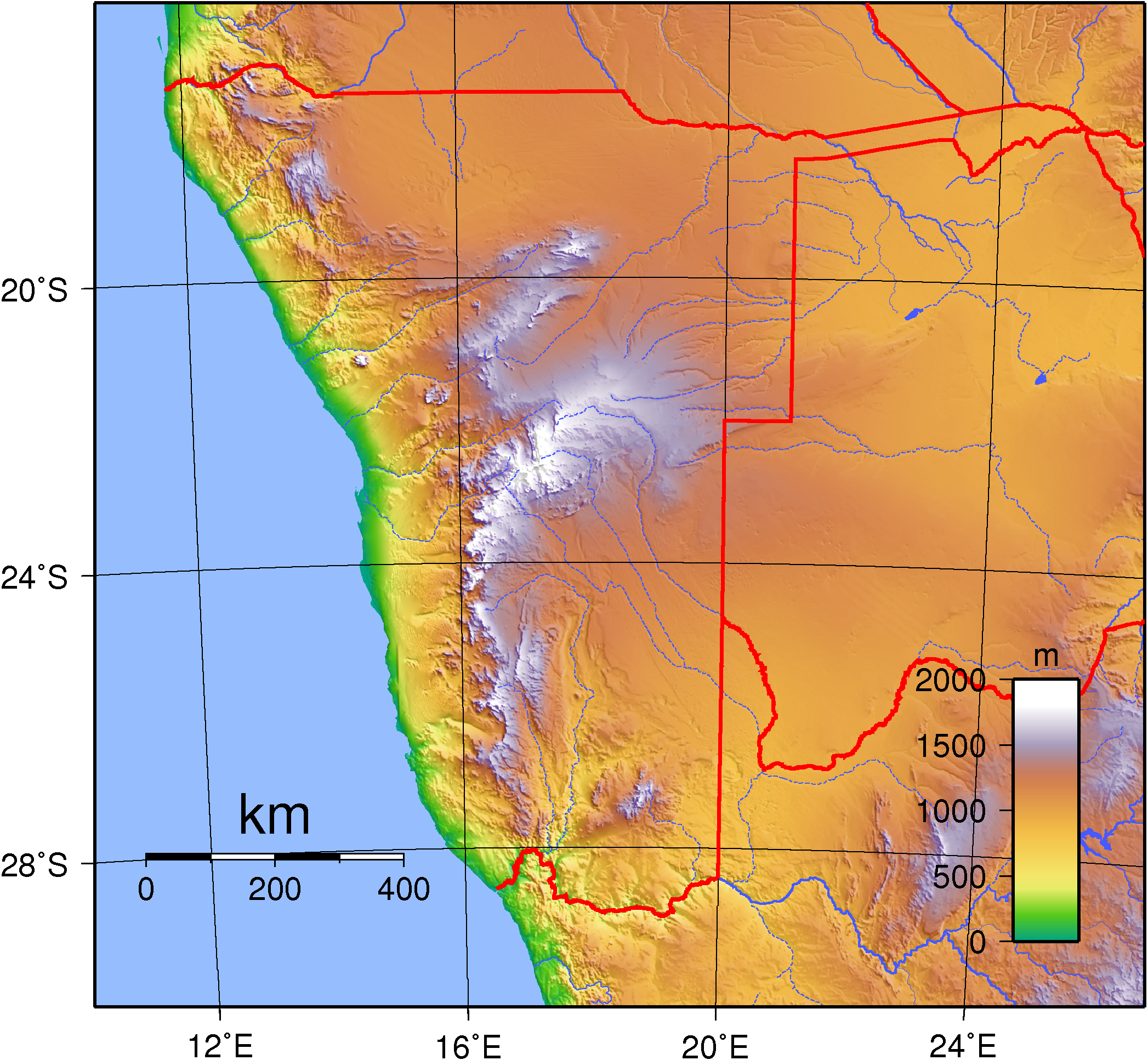
An enlargeable topographic map of Namibia

Geography of Namibia

- Namibia is: a sub-Saharan country
- Location:
  - Eastern Hemisphere and Southern Hemisphere
  - Africa
    - Southern Africa
  - Time zone: South African Standard Time (UTC+02)
  - Extreme points of Namibia
    - High: Konigstein 2,606 m (8,550 ft)
    - Low: South Atlantic Ocean 0 m
  - Land boundaries: 3,936 km

Angola 1,376 km
Botswana 1,360 km
South Africa 967 km
Zambia 233 km

- Coastline: South Atlantic Ocean 1,572 km

- Population of Namibia: 2,074,000 – 141st most populous country
- Area of Namibia: 825,418 km^{2}
- Atlas of Namibia

=== Environment of Namibia ===
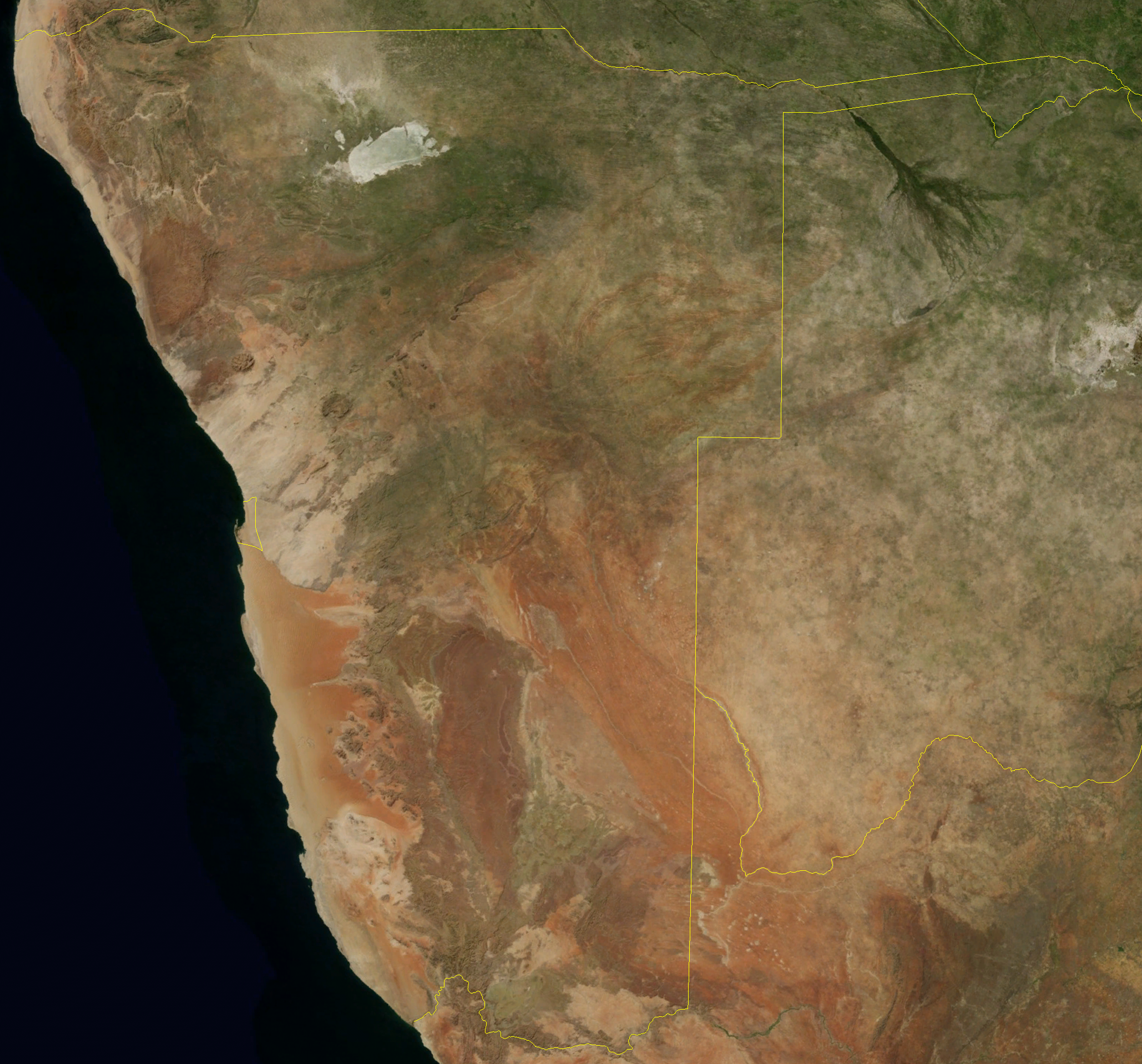
An enlargeable satellite image of Namibia

- Climate of Namibia
- Geology of Namibia
- Protected areas of Namibia
  - National parks of Namibia
- Wildlife of Namibia
  - Fauna of Namibia
    - Birds of Namibia
    - Mammals of Namibia
  - Flora of Namibia

==== Natural geographic features of Namibia ====
- Glaciers in Namibia: none
- Islands of Namibia
- Rivers of Namibia
- World Heritage Sites in Namibia

=== Regions of Namibia ===
==== Administrative divisions of Namibia ====
- Administrative divisions of Namibia
- Constituencies of Namibia

Namibia has 14 regions:

- Erongo
- Hardap
- ǁKaras
- Kavango East
- Kavango West
- Khomas
- Kunene
- Ohangwena
- Omaheke
- Omusati
- Oshana
- Oshikoto
- Otjozondjupa
- Zambezi

===== Municipalities of Namibia =====
- Capital of Namibia: Windhoek
- Cities of Namibia

==== Ecoregions of Namibia ====
List of ecoregions in Namibia

- Ecoregions in Namibia

=== Demography of Namibia ===
Demographics of Namibia

== Government and politics of Namibia ==
Politics of Namibia

- Form of government: unitary semi-presidential representative democratic republic
- Capital of Namibia: Windhoek
- Elections in Namibia
  - 2014 Namibian general election
  - 2015 Namibian local and regional elections
- Political parties in Namibia
- Taxation in Namibia

=== Branches of the government of Namibia ===
Government of Namibia

==== Executive branch of the government of Namibia ====
- Head of state and head of government: President of Namibia, Netumbo Nandi-Ndaitwah
- Cabinet of Namibia
  - Prime Minister of Namibia, Elijah Ngurare

==== Legislative branch of the government of Namibia ====
- Parliament of Namibia (bicameral)
  - Upper house: National Council of Namibia
  - Lower house: National Assembly of Namibia

==== Judicial branch of the government of Namibia ====
Court system of Namibia

- Supreme Court of Namibia

=== Foreign relations of Namibia ===
Foreign relations of Namibia

- Diplomatic missions in Namibia
- Diplomatic missions of Namibia
- Namibia-South Africa relations

==== International organization membership ====
The Republic of Namibia is a member of:

- African, Caribbean, and Pacific Group of States (ACP)
- African Development Bank Group (AfDB)
- African Union (AU)
- African Union/United Nations Hybrid operation in Darfur (UNAMID)
- Commonwealth of Nations
- Food and Agriculture Organization (FAO)
- Group of 77 (G77)
- International Atomic Energy Agency (IAEA)
- International Bank for Reconstruction and Development (IBRD)
- International Civil Aviation Organization (ICAO)
- International Criminal Court (ICCt)
- International Criminal Police Organization (Interpol)
- International Development Association (IDA)
- International Federation of Red Cross and Red Crescent Societies (IFRCS)
- International Finance Corporation (IFC)
- International Fund for Agricultural Development (IFAD)
- International Labour Organization (ILO)
- International Maritime Organization (IMO)
- International Monetary Fund (IMF)
- International Olympic Committee (IOC)
- International Organization for Migration (IOM) (observer)
- International Organization for Standardization (ISO) (correspondent)
- International Red Cross and Red Crescent Movement (ICRM)
- International Telecommunication Union (ITU)
- International Telecommunications Satellite Organization (ITSO)
- Inter-Parliamentary Union (IPU)
- Multilateral Investment Guarantee Agency (MIGA)
- Nonaligned Movement (NAM)
- Organisation for the Prohibition of Chemical Weapons (OPCW)
- Southern African Customs Union (SACU)
- Southern African Development Community (SADC)
- United Nations (UN)
- United Nations Conference on Trade and Development (UNCTAD)
- United Nations Educational, Scientific, and Cultural Organization (UNESCO)
- United Nations High Commissioner for Refugees (UNHCR)
- United Nations Industrial Development Organization (UNIDO)
- United Nations Mission in Liberia (UNMIL)
- United Nations Mission in the Sudan (UNMIS)
- United Nations Operation in Cote d'Ivoire (UNOCI)
- Universal Postal Union (UPU)
- World Confederation of Labour (WCL)
- World Customs Organization (WCO)
- World Federation of Trade Unions (WFTU)
- World Health Organization (WHO)
- World Intellectual Property Organization (WIPO)
- World Meteorological Organization (WMO)
- World Tourism Organization (UNWTO)
- World Trade Organization (WTO)

=== Law and order in Namibia ===
Law of Namibia

- Cannabis in Namibia
- Constitution of Namibia
- Crime in Namibia
- Human rights in Namibia
  - LGBT rights in Namibia
- Law enforcement in Namibia

=== Military of Namibia ===
Military of Namibia

- Command
  - Commander-in-chief: John Mutwa
    - Minister of Defence of Namibia: Penda Ya Ndakolo
- Forces
  - Namibian Army
  - Namibian Navy
    - Namibian Marine Corps
  - Namibian Air Force
  - Namibian Special Forces

=== Local government in Namibia ===
Local government in Namibia

== History of Namibia ==
History of Namibia

=== By topic ===
- History of rail transport in Namibia
- History of the Jews in Namibia

== Culture of Namibia ==
Culture of Namibia

- Cuisine of Namibia
- Languages of Namibia
- National symbols of Namibia
  - Coat of arms of Namibia
  - Flag of Namibia
  - National anthem of Namibia
- Prostitution in Namibia
- Public holidays in Namibia
- Religion in Namibia
  - Christianity in Namibia
  - Hinduism in Namibia
  - Islam in Namibia
- World Heritage Sites in Namibia

=== Art in Namibia ===
- Music of Namibia

=== Sport in Namibia ===
Sport in Namibia

- Football in Namibia
- Namibia at the Olympics

== Economy and infrastructure of Namibia ==
Economy of Namibia

- Economic rank, by nominal GDP (2018): 126th (one hundred and twenty sixth)
- Agriculture in Namibia
- Communications in Namibia
  - Media of Namibia
    - List of newspapers in Namibia
- Companies of Namibia
  - List of airlines of Namibia
  - List of banks in Namibia
  - List of state-owned enterprises in Namibia
- Currency of Namibia: Dollar
  - ISO 4217: NAD
- Health care in Namibia
- Mining in Namibia
- Namibia Stock Exchange
- Tourism in Namibia
- Transport in Namibia
  - Airports in Namibia
  - Rail transport in Namibia
  - Roads in Namibia
- Water supply and sanitation in Namibia

== Education in Namibia ==
Education in Namibia

- List of schools in Namibia
- List of universities in Namibia

== See also ==
- List of international rankings
- List of Namibia-related topics
- Member state of the Commonwealth of Nations
- Member state of the United Nations
- Outline of Africa
- Outline of geography
