= Geography of Namibia =

- Continent: Africa
- Region: Southern Africa
- Coordinates: 22°00′S 17°00′E
- Area: Ranked 34th
  - Total: 825,615 km^{2} (318,772 sq mi)
  - Land: 99.88%
  - Water: 0.12%
- Coastline: 1,572 km (977 mi)
- Borders: Total: 4,220 km (2,620 mi)
- Highest point: Königstein; 2,573 metres (8,442 ft)
- Lowest point: Atlantic Ocean; 0 metres (0 ft)
- Longest river: Fish River; 650 km (400 mi)
- Largest lake: Lake Guinas; 0.66 ha (1.6 acres)
- Exclusive economic zone: 564,748 km^{2} (218,050 mi^{2})

Location of Namibia

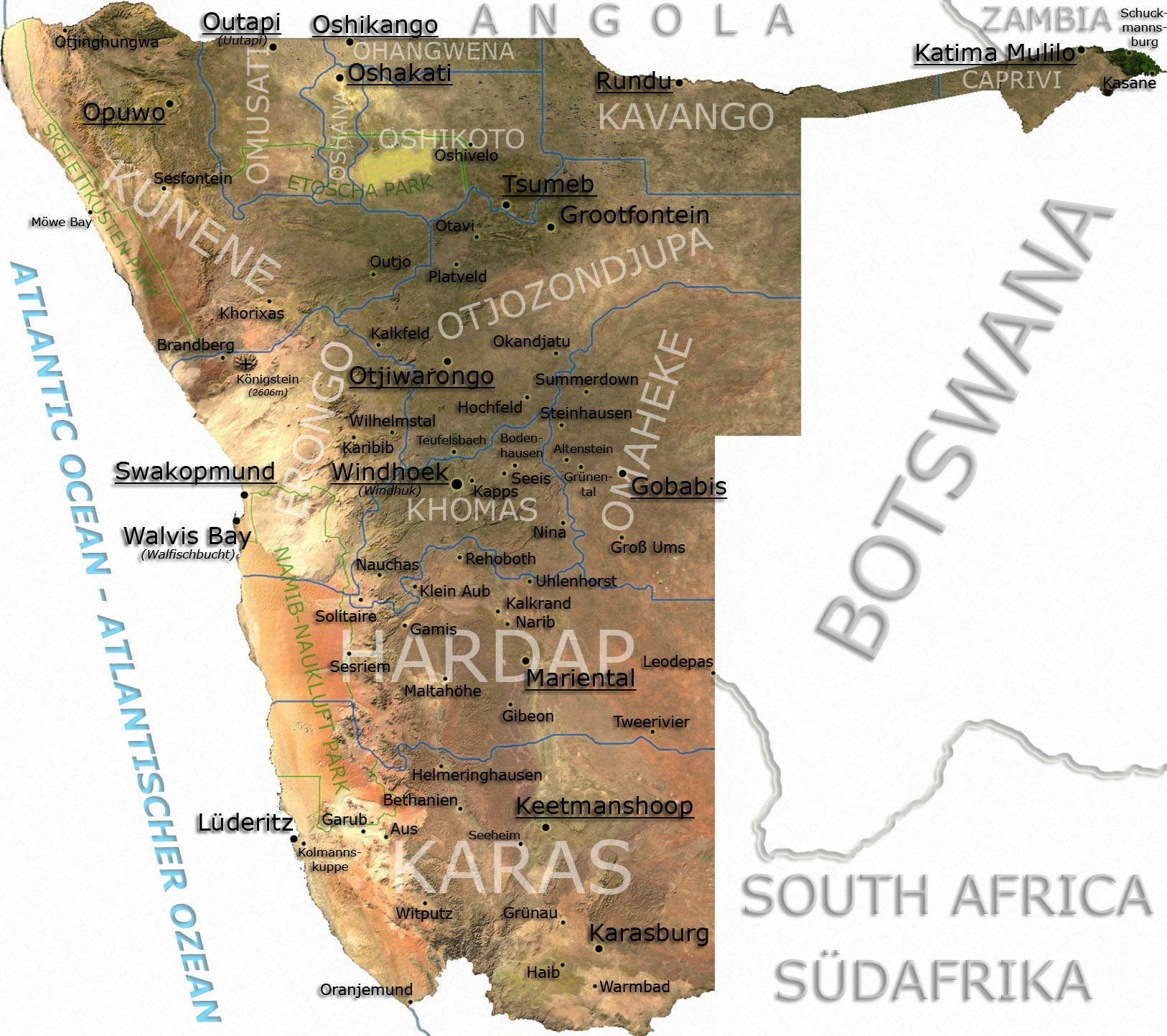
Detailed map of Namibia based on radar

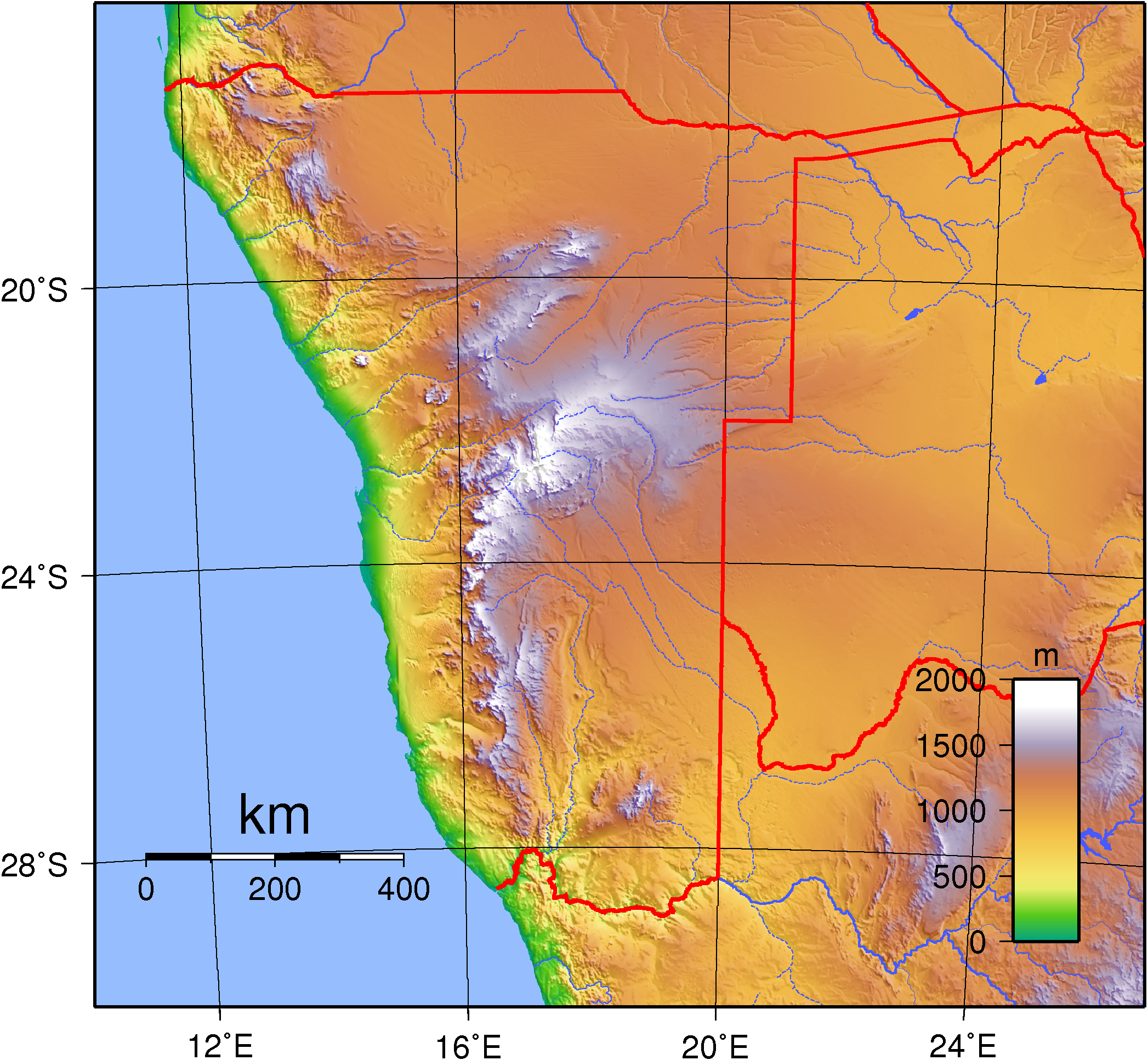
Topographic map of Namibia.

At 824,292 km^{2} (318,261 sq mi), Namibia is the world's thirty-fourth largest country. After Mongolia, Namibia is the second least densely populated country in the world (2.7 inhabitants per square kilometre (7.0/sq mi)). Namibia got its name from the Namib desert that stretches along the coast of the Atlantic. It is also known for its wildlife.

== Geographical areas ==
The Namibian landscape consists generally of five geographical areas, each with characteristic abiotic conditions and vegetation with some variation within and overlap between them: the Central Plateau, the Namib Desert, the Great Escarpment, the Bushveld, and the Kalahari Desert.

=== Central Plateau ===
The Central Plateau runs from north to south, bordered by the Skeleton Coast to the northwest, the Namib Desert and its coastal plains to the southwest, the Orange River to the south, and the Kalahari Desert to the east. The Central Plateau is home to the highest point in Namibia at Königstein elevation 2,606 metres (8,550 ft). Within the wide, flat Central Plateau is the majority of Namibia's population and economic activity. Windhoek, the nation's capital, is located here, as well as most of the arable land. Although arable land accounts for only 1% of Namibia, nearly 1/3rd of the population is employed in agriculture.

The abiotic conditions here are similar to those found along the Escarpment; however, the topographic complexity is reduced. Summer temperatures in the area can reach 40 °C (104 °F), and frosts are common in the winter.

=== Namib Desert ===
The Namib Desert is a broad expanse of hyper-arid gravel, gravel with no moisture, plains, and dunes that stretches along the entire coastline, which varies in width between 100 and many hundreds of kilometres. Areas within the Namib include the Skeleton Coast and the Kaokoveld in the north and the extensive Namib Sand Sea along the central coast. The sands that make up the sand sea are a consequence of erosional processes that take place within the Orange River valley and areas farther to the south. As sand-laden waters drop their suspended loads into the Atlantic, onshore currents deposit them along the shore. The prevailing southwest winds then pick up and redeposit the sand in the form of massive dunes in the widespread sand sea, the largest sand dunes in the world. In areas where the supply of sand is reduced because of the inability of the sand to cross riverbeds, the winds also scour the land to form large gravel plains. In many areas within the Namib Desert, there is little vegetation with the exception of lichens found in the gravel plains, and in dry river beds where plants can access subterranean water.

"Fairy circles", which are circular patches of land barren of plants, varying between 22 and 12 metres (7 and 39 ft) in diameter and often encircled by a ring of stimulated growth of grass, are found in the Namib, such as those near the Wolwedans desert camp.

=== Great Escarpment ===
The Great Escarpment swiftly rises to over 2,000 metres (6,562 ft). Average temperatures and temperature ranges increase as you move farther inland from the cold Atlantic waters, while the lingering coastal fogs slowly diminish. Although the area is rocky with poorly developed soils, it is nonetheless significantly more productive than the Namib Desert. As summer winds are forced over the Escarpment, moisture is extracted as precipitation. The water, along with rapidly changing topography, is responsible for the creation of microhabitats which offer a wide range of organisms, many of them endemic. Vegetation along the escarpment varies in both form and density, with community structure ranging from dense woodlands to more shrubby areas with scattered trees. A number of Acacia species are found here, as well as grasses and other shrub vegetation.

=== Bushveld ===
The Bushveld is found in northeastern Namibia along the Angolan border and in the Caprivi Strip which is the vestige of a narrow corridor demarcated for the German Empire to access the Zambezi River. The area receives a significantly greater amount of precipitation than the rest of the country, averaging around 400 mm (15.7 in) per year. Temperatures are also cooler and more moderate, with approximate seasonal variations of between 10 and 30 °C (50 and 86 °F). The area is generally flat and the soils sandy, limiting their ability to retain water. Located adjacent to the Bushveld in north-central Namibia is one of nature's most spectacular features: the Etosha Pan. For most of the year, it is a dry, saline wasteland, but during the wet season, it forms a shallow lake covering more than 6,000 square kilometres (2,317 sq mi). The area is ecologically important and vital to the large numbers of birds and animals from the surrounding savannah that gather in the region as summer drought forces them to the scattered waterholes that ring the pan. The Bushveld area has been demarcated by the World Wildlife Fund as part of the Angolan mopane woodlands ecoregion, which extends north across the Cunene River into neighbouring Angola.

=== Kalahari Desert ===
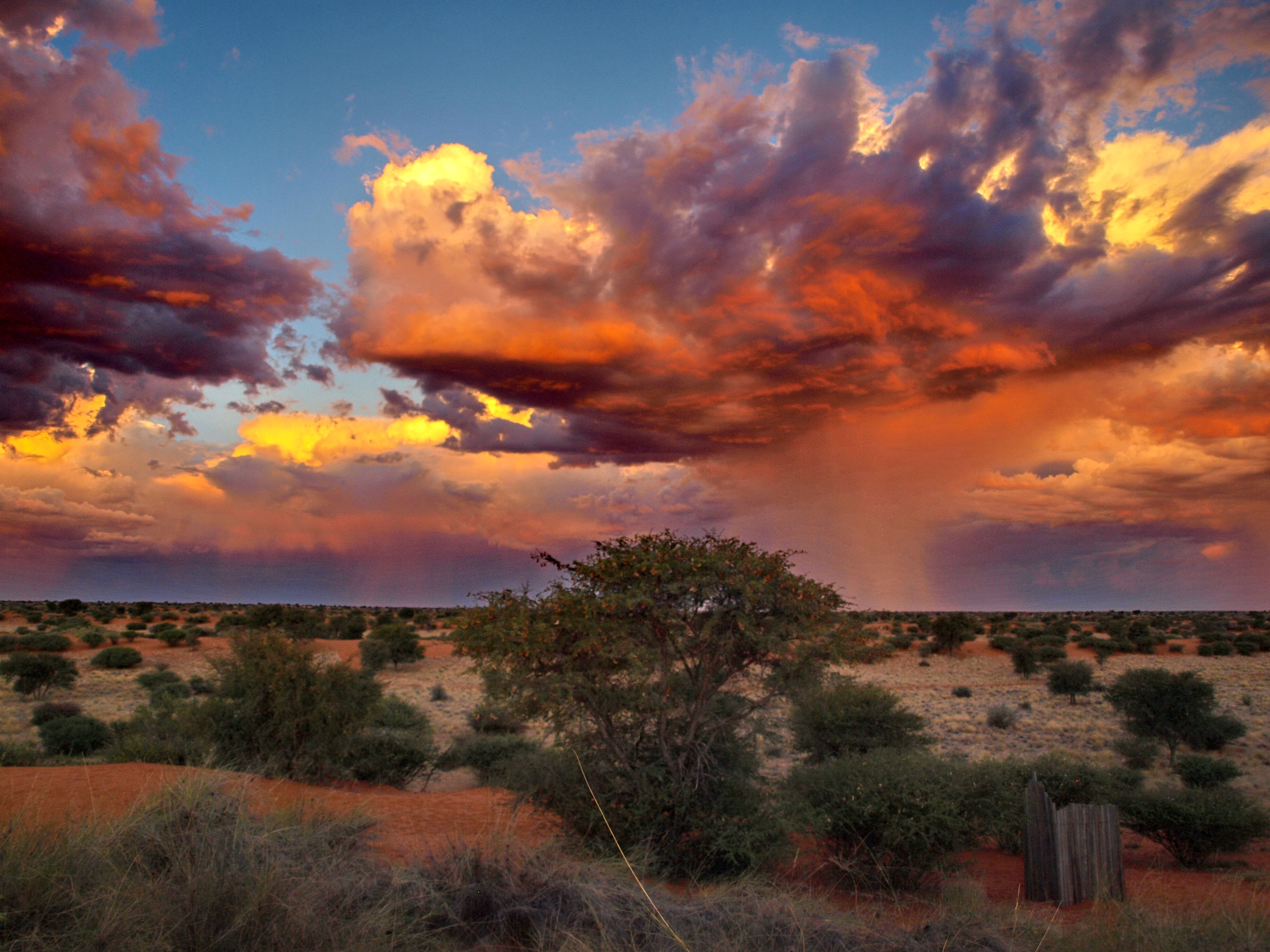
Thunderstorm in the Kalahari near Stampriet

The Kalahari Desert is perhaps Namibia's best-known geographical feature. Shared with South Africa and Botswana, it has a variety of localised environments ranging from hyper-arid sandy desert to areas that seem to defy the common definition of desert. One of these areas, known as the Succulent Karoo, is home to over 5,000 species of plants, nearly half of them endemic; fully one-third of the world's succulents are found in the Karoo.

The reason behind this high productivity and endemism may be the relatively stable nature of precipitation. The Karoo apparently does not experience drought regularly, so even though the area is technically a desert, regular winter rains provide enough moisture to support the region's interesting plant community. Another feature of the Kalahari, indeed many parts of Namibia, are inselbergs, isolated mountains that create microclimates and habitats for organisms not adapted to life in the surrounding desert matrix.

=== Coastal Desert ===
Namibia's Coastal Desert is one of the oldest deserts in the world. Its sand dunes, created by the strong onshore winds, are the highest in the world.

The Namib Desert and the Namib-Naukluft National Park are located here. The Namibian coastal deserts are the richest source of diamonds on earth, making Namibia the world's largest producer of diamonds. It is divided into the northern Skeleton Coast and the southern Diamond Coast. Because of the location of the shoreline—at the point where the Atlantic's cold water reaches Africa—there is often extremely dense fog.

Sandy beach comprises 54% and mixed sand and rock add another 28%. Only 16% of the total length is rocky shoreline. The coastal plains are dune fields, gravel plains covered with lichen and some scattered salt pans. Near the coast, there are areas where the dunes are vegetated with hammocks. Namibia has rich coastal and marine resources that remain largely unexplored.

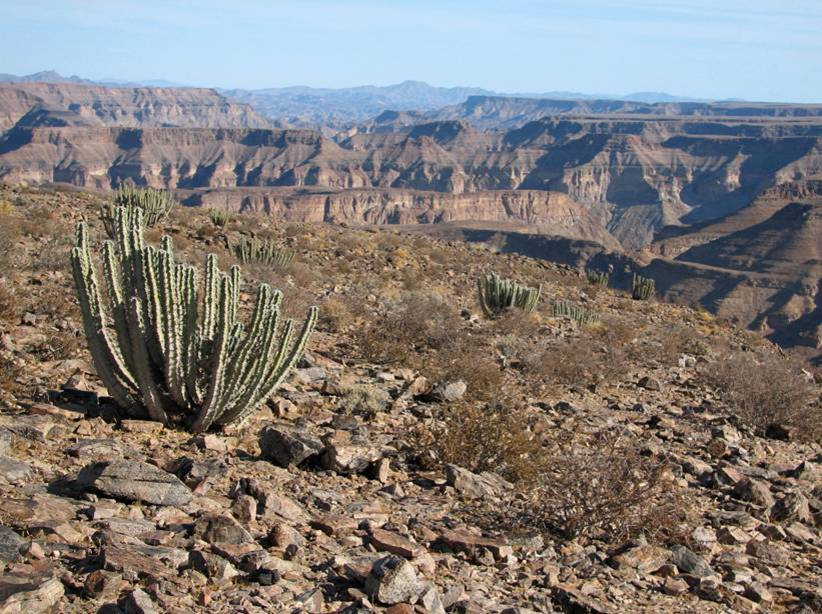
Fish River Canyon.

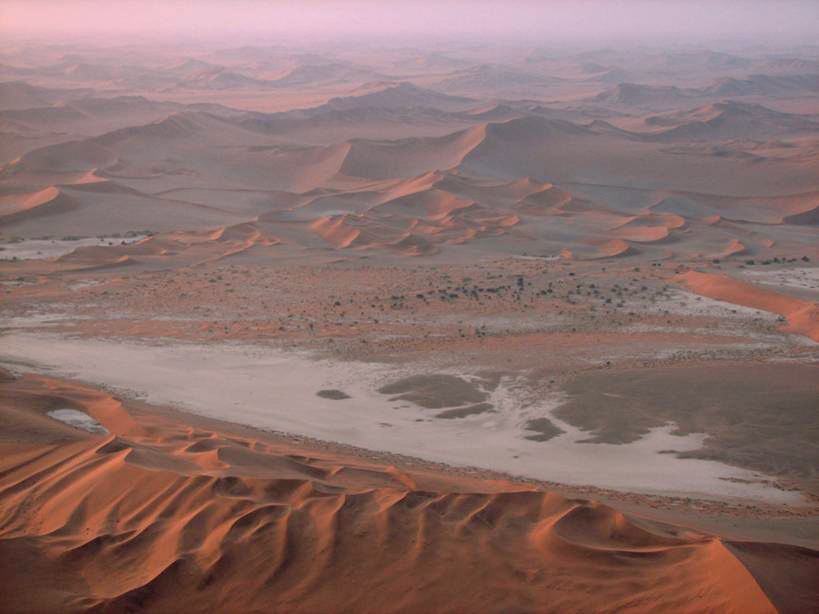
Namib Desert.

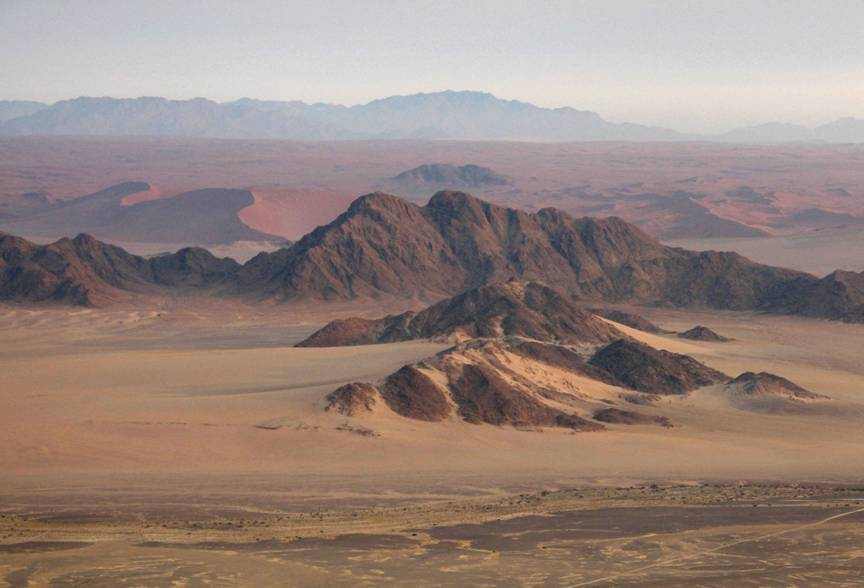
Namib Escarpment.

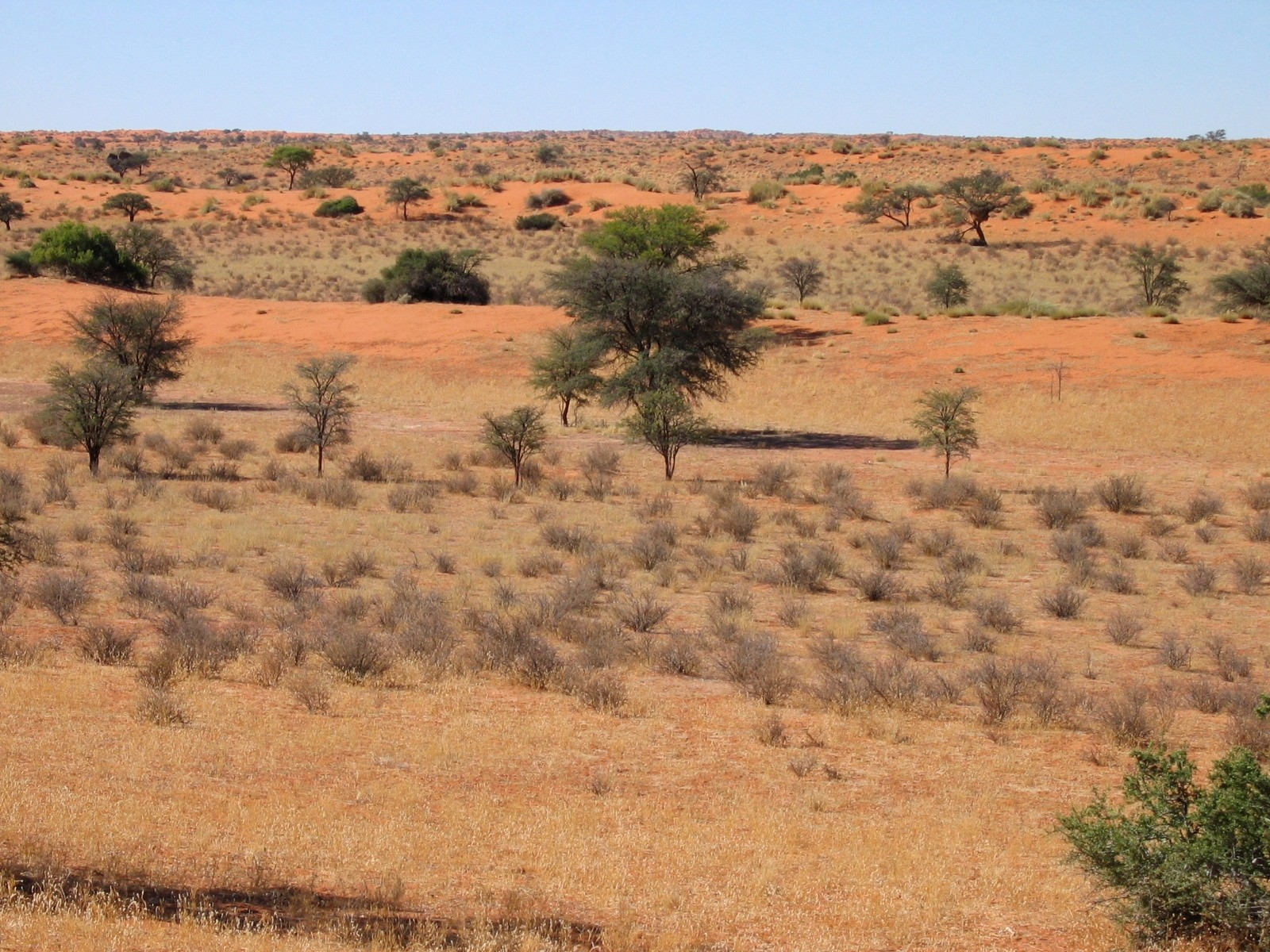
The Kalahari Desert.

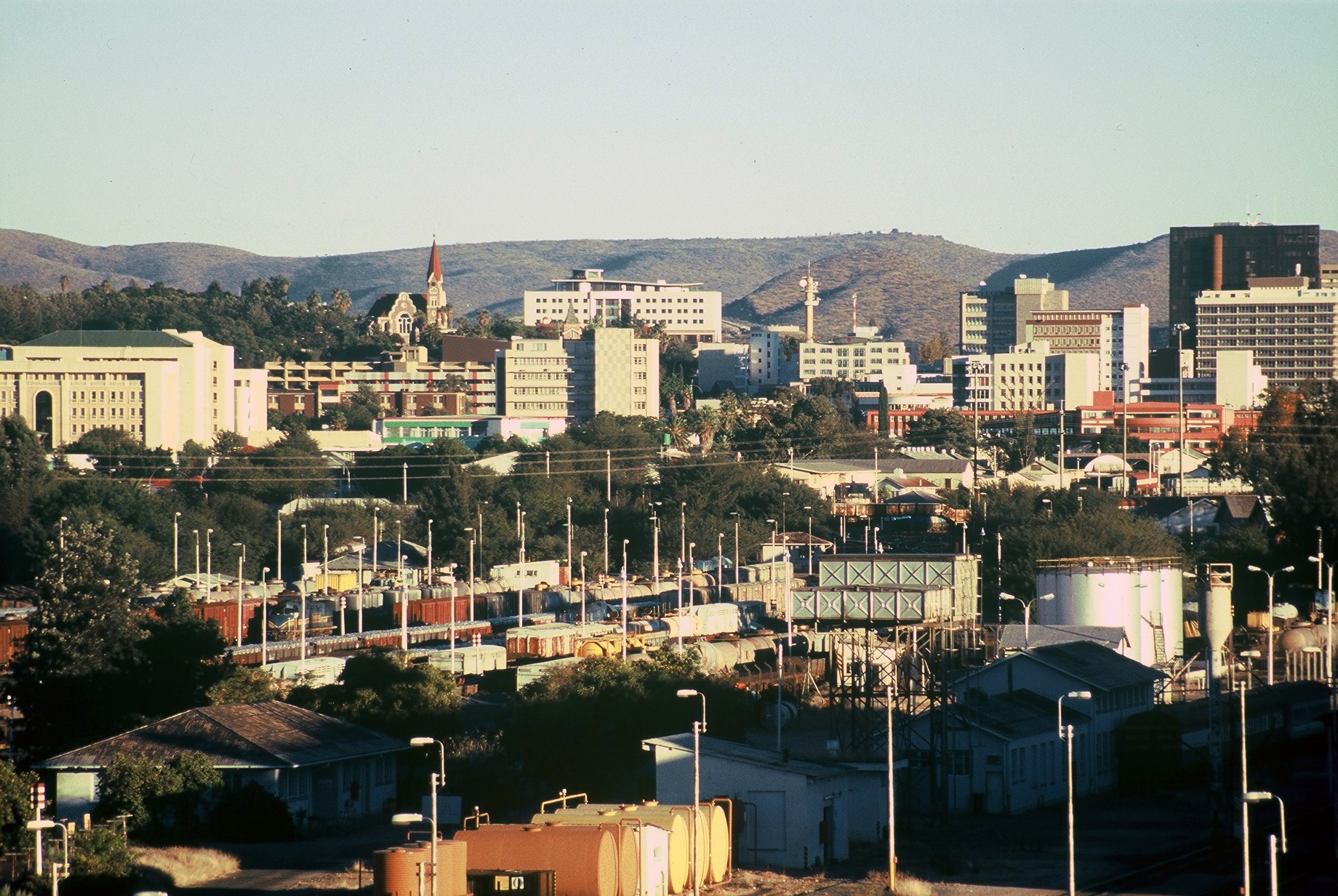
Windhoek skyline.

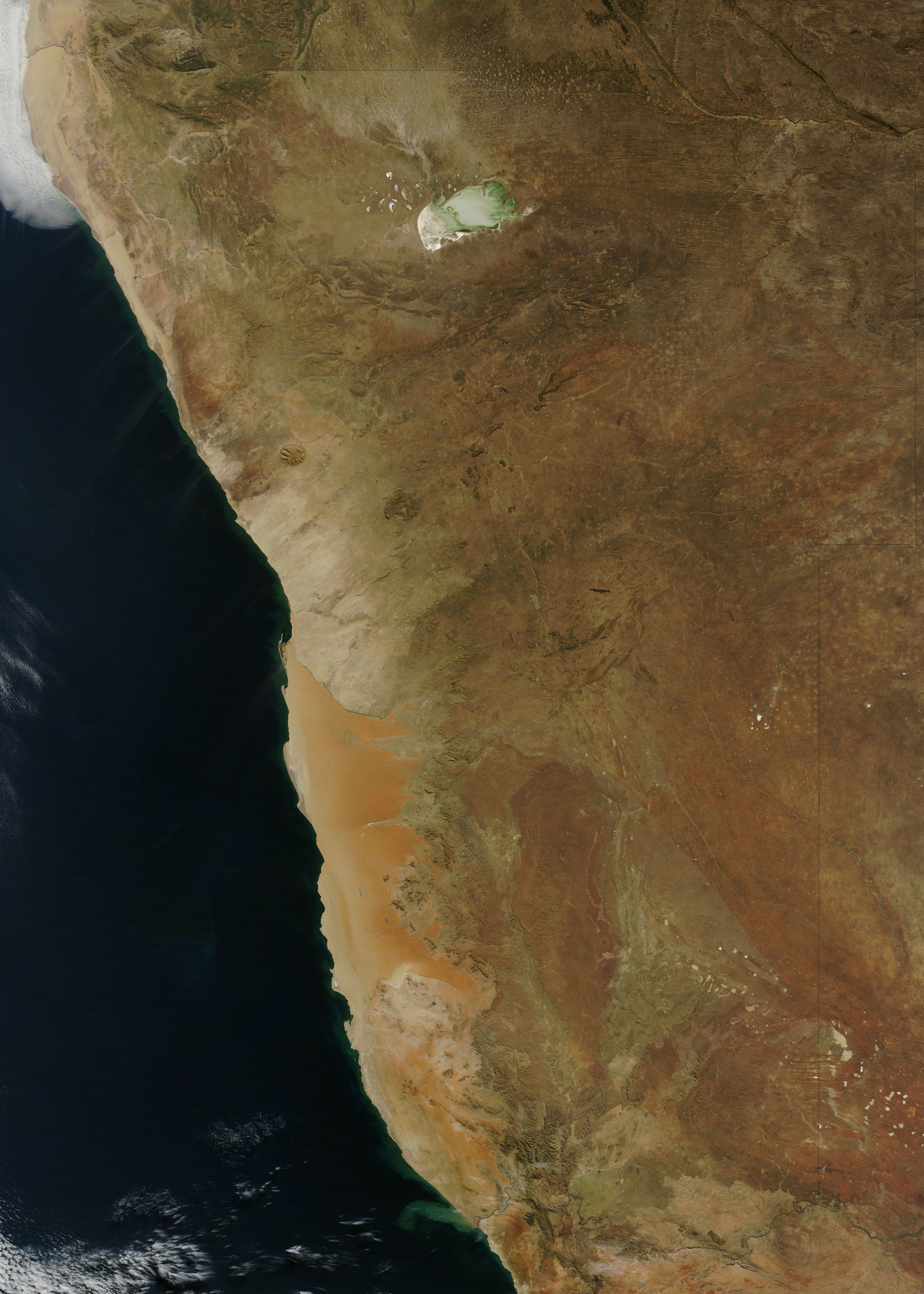
Natural-colour satellite image of the Namibian coast.

== Weather and climate ==
Köppen climate classification map of Namibia

Namibia has more than 300 days of sunshine per year. It is situated at the southern edge of the tropics; the Tropic of Capricorn cuts the country about in half. The winter (June–August) is generally dry, both rainy seasons occur in summer, the small rainy season between September and November, and the big one between February and April. Humidity is low, and average rainfall varies from almost zero in the coastal desert to more than 600 millimetres or 24 inches in the Caprivi Strip. Rainfall is however highly variable, and droughts are common. A bad rainy season occurred in the summer of 2006/07. Very low rainfall was recorded in 2019. Due to the dry winters snowfall constitutes a very rare occurrence and prompts media coverage whenever it happens. The last snow was reported at Spreetshoogte Pass in the Namib-Naukluft Park in June 2011.

Weather and climate in the coastal area are dominated by the cold, north-flowing Benguela Current of the Atlantic Ocean which accounts for very low precipitation totalling 50 millimetres or 2 inches per year or less, frequent dense fog, and overall lower temperatures than in the rest of the country. In winter, occasionally a condition known as Berg wind or Oosweer (Afrikaans: East weather) occurs, a hot dry wind blowing from the inland to the coast. As the area behind the coast is a desert, these winds can develop into sand storms with sand deposits in the Atlantic Ocean visible on satellite images.

The Central Plateau and Kalahari areas have wide diurnal temperature ranges of up to 30 °C or 54.0 °F.

=== Examples ===
Climate data for Windhoek (1,728 metres or 5,669 feet), Namibia
Month	Jan	Feb	Mar	Apr	May	Jun	Jul	Aug	Sep	Oct	Nov	Dec	Year
Record high °C (°F)	36.0 (96.8)	35.8 (96.4)	34.9 (94.8)	31.3 (88.3)	31.8 (89.2)	26.1 (79.0)	25.7 (78.3)	30.0 (86.0)	33.2 (91.8)	35.1 (95.2)	36.5 (97.7)	36.6 (97.9)	36.6 (97.9)
Mean daily maximum °C (°F)	30.0 (86.0)	28.6 (83.5)	27.2 (81.0)	25.6 (78.1)	22.7 (72.9)	20.2 (68.4)	20.5 (68.9)	23.4 (74.1)	26.5 (79.7)	29.1 (84.4)	29.6 (85.3)	30.7 (87.3)	26.1 (79.0)
Daily mean °C (°F)	23.3 (73.9)	22.1 (71.8)	21.0 (69.8)	18.9 (66.0)	15.8 (60.4)	13.2 (55.8)	13.1 (55.6)	15.8 (60.4)	19.3 (66.7)	21.7 (71.1)	22.5 (72.5)	23.5 (74.3)	19.1 (66.4)
Mean daily minimum °C (°F)	17.2 (63.0)	16.5 (61.7)	15.4 (59.7)	12.8 (55.0)	9.2 (48.6)	6.7 (44.1)	6.3 (43.3)	8.6 (47.5)	11.9 (53.4)	14.6 (58.3)	15.6 (60.1)	16.9 (62.4)	12.7 (54.9)
Record low °C (°F)	7.5 (45.5)	6.8 (44.2)	3.7 (38.7)	2.4 (36.3)	−1.6 (29.1)	−2.8 (27.0)	−2.6 (27.3)	−3.9 (25.0)	−1.1 (30.0)	1.6 (34.9)	0.4 (32.7)	3.3 (37.9)	−3.9 (25.0)
Average precipitation mm (inches)	78.1 (3.07)	80.3 (3.16)	78.7 (3.10)	37.7 (1.48)	6.6 (0.26)	1.2 (0.05)	0.7 (0.03)	0.9 (0.04)	2.8 (0.11)	11.8 (0.46)	26.9 (1.06)	41.7 (1.64)	367.4 (14.46)
Average precipitation days (≥ 0.1 mm)	11.1	10.7	10.5	5.5	1.9	0.7	0.5	0.3	0.9	2.8	5.3	7.5	57.7
Average relative humidity (%)	42	56	51	44	37	32	27	19	17	22	30	34	34
Mean monthly sunshine hours	288	254	282	273	310	309	326	341	321	319	297	285	3,605
Source 1: Deutscher Wetterdienst
Source 2: Danish Meteorological Institute (sun only)

Climate data for Pelican Point, Walvis Bay (7 metres or 23 feet), Namibia (1958–1984)
Month	Jan	Feb	Mar	Apr	May	Jun	Jul	Aug	Sep	Oct	Nov	Dec	Year
Record high °C (°F)	25.3 (77.5)	26.4 (79.5)	34.5 (94.1)	35.0 (95.0)	36.0 (96.8)	32.5 (90.5)	32.9 (91.2)	33.4 (92.1)	31.3 (88.3)	27.5 (81.5)	28.3 (82.9)	25.5 (77.9)	36.0 (96.8)
Mean daily maximum °C (°F)	20.0 (68.0)	20.3 (68.5)	19.6 (67.3)	18.6 (65.5)	19.0 (66.2)	18.8 (65.8)	17.8 (64.0)	16.4 (61.5)	15.8 (60.4)	16.6 (61.9)	17.7 (63.9)	19.0 (66.2)	18.3 (64.9)
Daily mean °C (°F)	17.6 (63.7)	17.9 (64.2)	17.2 (63.0)	15.7 (60.3)	15.6 (60.1)	15.2 (59.4)	14.1 (57.4)	13.2 (55.8)	13.2 (55.8)	14.0 (57.2)	15.3 (59.5)	16.6 (61.9)	15.5 (59.9)
Mean daily minimum °C (°F)	15.2 (59.4)	15.5 (59.9)	14.7 (58.5)	12.9 (55.2)	12.1 (53.8)	11.4 (52.5)	10.3 (50.5)	10.1 (50.2)	10.7 (51.3)	11.5 (52.7)	12.9 (55.2)	14.2 (57.6)	12.6 (54.7)
Record low °C (°F)	10.5 (50.9)	9.2 (48.6)	10.5 (50.9)	8.5 (47.3)	7.0 (44.6)	5.0 (41.0)	3.4 (38.1)	4.4 (39.9)	6.1 (43.0)	5.0 (41.0)	8.5 (47.3)	9.6 (49.3)	3.4 (38.1)
Average precipitation mm (inches)	1.0 (0.04)	2.0 (0.08)	5.0 (0.20)	1.0 (0.04)	1.0 (0.04)	2.0 (0.08)	0.0 (0.0)	0.2 (0.01)	0.1 (0.00)	0.1 (0.00)	0.7 (0.03)	0.1 (0.00)	13.2 (0.52)
Average precipitation days (≥ 0.1 mm)	0.6	0.8	1.1	0.5	0.4	0.5	0.0	0.4	0.5	0.4	0.6	0.4	6.2
Average relative humidity (%)	87	87	89	89	86	81	82	86	89	88	88	88	87
Mean monthly sunshine hours	232	189	211	237	251	231	236	220	189	226	210	214	2,646
Source 1: Deutscher Wetterdienst
Source 2: Danish Meteorological Institute

Climate data for Lüderitz
Month	Jan	Feb	Mar	Apr	May	Jun	Jul	Aug	Sep	Oct	Nov	Dec	Year
Record high °C (°F)	32.5 (90.5)	30.0 (86.0)	34.1 (93.4)	36.5 (97.7)	33.0 (91.4)	31.6 (88.9)	30.7 (87.3)	33.0 (91.4)	35.1 (95.2)	35.0 (95.0)	37.5 (99.5)	30.6 (87.1)	37.5 (99.5)
Mean daily maximum °C (°F)	21.4 (70.5)	21.3 (70.3)	21.1 (70.0)	19.9 (67.8)	19.2 (66.6)	19.0 (66.2)	17.9 (64.2)	17.2 (63.0)	17.3 (63.1)	18.0 (64.4)	19.2 (66.6)	20.5 (68.9)	19.3 (66.7)
Daily mean °C (°F)	17.7 (63.9)	17.8 (64.0)	17.4 (63.3)	16.3 (61.3)	15.5 (59.9)	15.1 (59.2)	14.1 (57.4)	13.7 (56.7)	13.9 (57.0)	14.7 (58.5)	15.8 (60.4)	17.0 (62.6)	15.7 (60.3)
Mean daily minimum °C (°F)	14.0 (57.2)	14.3 (57.7)	13.8 (56.8)	12.6 (54.7)	11.7 (53.1)	11.2 (52.2)	10.4 (50.7)	10.2 (50.4)	10.5 (50.9)	11.4 (52.5)	12.3 (54.1)	13.5 (56.3)	12.1 (53.8)
Record low °C (°F)	5.5 (41.9)	5.0 (41.0)	6.0 (42.8)	5.5 (41.9)	3.3 (37.9)	0.2 (32.4)	3.0 (37.4)	4.8 (40.6)	3.4 (38.1)	3.4 (38.1)	4.9 (40.8)	3.9 (39.0)	0.2 (32.4)
Average precipitation mm (inches)	0 (0)	1 (0.0)	2 (0.1)	2 (0.1)	3 (0.1)	3 (0.1)	1 (0.0)	2 (0.1)	1 (0.0)	0 (0)	0 (0)	0 (0)	17 (0.7)
Average precipitation days (≥ 0.1 mm)	1.0	1.0	1.0	0.9	1.4	1.4	1.0	0.7	0.5	0.5	0.5	0.7	10.6
Average relative humidity (%)	82	81	82	80	79	72	74	78	80	80	80	80	79
Mean monthly sunshine hours	198.4	203.4	257.3	216.0	213.9	144.0	170.5	201.5	216.0	201.5	189.0	176.7	2,388.2
Mean daily sunshine hours	6.4	7.2	8.3	7.2	6.9	4.8	5.5	6.5	7.2	6.5	6.3	5.7	6.5
Source: Deutscher Wetterdienst

Climate data for Keetmanshoop
Month	Jan	Feb	Mar	Apr	May	Jun	Jul	Aug	Sep	Oct	Nov	Dec	Year
Mean daily maximum °C (°F)	34.8 (94.6)	34.0 (93.2)	32.2 (90.0)	28.8 (83.8)	25.0 (77.0)	21.7 (71.1)	21.3 (70.3)	23.5 (74.3)	27.2 (81.0)	30.1 (86.2)	32.4 (90.3)	34.5 (94.1)	28.8 (83.8)
Mean daily minimum °C (°F)	19.0 (66.2)	19.3 (66.7)	17.8 (64.0)	14.4 (57.9)	10.4 (50.7)	7.0 (44.6)	6.4 (43.5)	7.5 (45.5)	10.7 (51.3)	13.7 (56.7)	15.7 (60.3)	17.6 (63.7)	13.3 (55.9)
Average precipitation mm (inches)	24 (0.9)	42 (1.7)	36 (1.4)	15 (0.6)	5 (0.2)	2 (0.1)	1 (0.0)	1 (0.0)	3 (0.1)	6 (0.2)	11 (0.4)	13 (0.5)	159 (6.1)
Average relative humidity (%)	28	36	40	40	38	39	36	31	27	24	24	25	32
Mean monthly sunshine hours	353	300	312	306	304	287	305	323	319	343	348	370	3,870
Percentage possible sunshine	84	82	82	89	91	91	93	93	89	87	86	86	88
Source: Tabulation of Climate Statistics for Selected Stations in Namibia

Climate data for Katima Mulilo, Namibia
Month	Jan	Feb	Mar	Apr	May	Jun	Jul	Aug	Sep	Oct	Nov	Dec	Year
Mean daily maximum °C (°F)	31.3 (88.3)	30.5 (86.9)	29.8 (85.6)	29.1 (84.4)	27.4 (81.3)	24.5 (76.1)	25.0 (77.0)	29.1 (84.4)	33.8 (92.8)	33.0 (91.4)	30.3 (86.5)	29.8 (85.6)	29.5 (85.1)
Mean daily minimum °C (°F)	19.1 (66.4)	19.1 (66.4)	18.7 (65.7)	14.6 (58.3)	10.2 (50.4)	6.1 (43.0)	4.6 (40.3)	8.3 (46.9)	14.1 (57.4)	17.8 (64.0)	19.3 (66.7)	18.8 (65.8)	14.2 (57.6)
Average precipitation mm (inches)	169.4 (6.67)	160.6 (6.32)	88.7 (3.49)	17.7 (0.70)	1.9 (0.07)	0.5 (0.02)	0 (0)	0.2 (0.01)	2.6 (0.10)	18.8 (0.74)	69.7 (2.74)	151.8 (5.98)	681.9 (26.85)
Average relative humidity (%)	68	66	70	61	53	53	62	50	42	46	49	57	56.4
Source: Ministry of Works and Transport (Meteorological Service Division) "Ministry of Works & Transport: Tabulation of Climate Statistics for Selected Stations in Namibia" (PDF). 2012.

=== Water sources ===
Namibia is the driest country in sub-Saharan Africa and depends largely on groundwater. With an average rainfall of about 350 mm (14 in) per annum, the highest rainfall occurs in the Caprivi in the northeast (about 600 mm (24 in) per annum) and decreases in a westerly and southwesterly direction to as little as 50 mm (2 in) and less per annum at the coast. The only perennial rivers are found on the national borders with South Africa, Angola, Zambia, and the short border with Botswana in the Caprivi. In the interior of the country, surface water is available only in the summer months when rivers are in flood after exceptional rainfalls. Otherwise, surface water is restricted to a few large storage dams retaining and damming up these seasonal floods and their runoff. Where people do not live near perennial rivers or make use of storage dams, they are dependent on groundwater. Even isolated communities and those economic activities located far from good surface water sources, such as mining, agriculture, and tourism, can be supplied from groundwater over nearly 80% of the country. The longest river in Namibia is the Fish River with a length of 650 km (400 mi).

More than 120,000 boreholes have been drilled in Namibia over the past century. One-third of these boreholes have been drilled dry. An aquifer called "Ohangwena II", located on both sides of the Angola-Namibia border, was discovered in 2012. This aquifer has been estimated to be capable of supplying the 800,000 people in the North for 400 years, at the current (2018) rate of consumption. Experts estimate that Namibia has 7,720 km^{3} (1,850 cu mi) of underground water.

Efundja, the annual flooding of the northern parts of the country, often causes not only damage to infrastructure but loss of life. The rains that cause these floods originate in Angola, flow into Namibia's Cuvelai basin, and fill the Oshanas (Oshiwambo: flood plains) there. The worst floods so far occurred in March 2011 and displaced 21,000 people.

== Urbanization ==
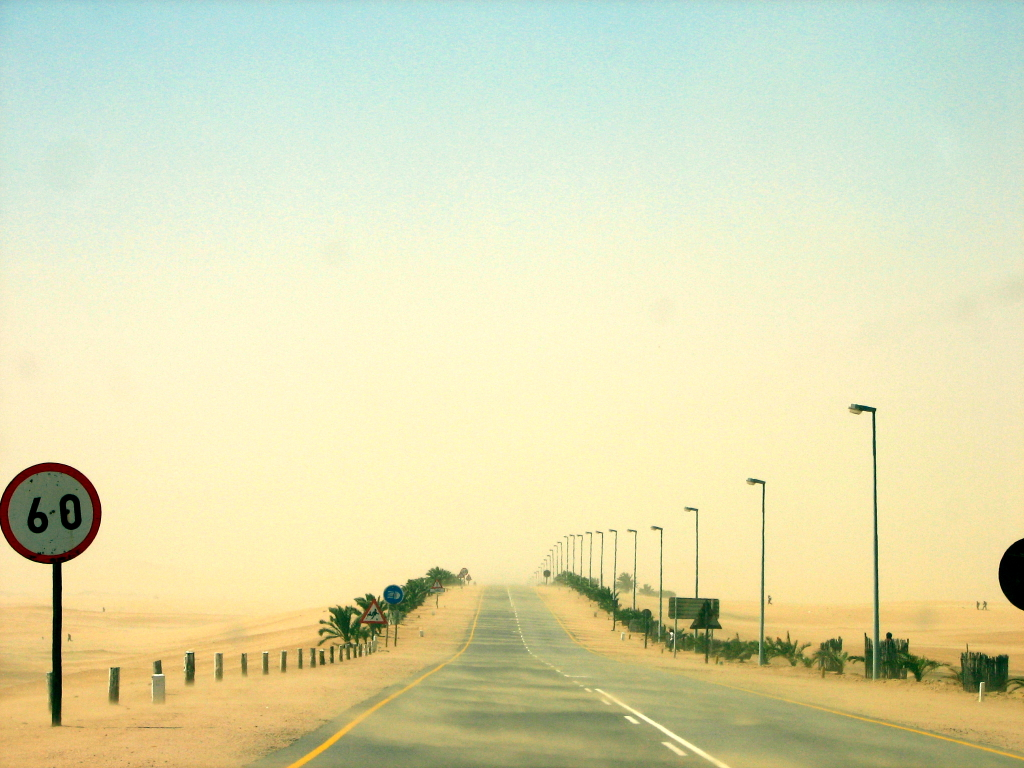
The Road between Swakopmund and Walvis Bay, Namibia.

The capital and largest city, Windhoek, is in the centre of the country. It is home to the country's Central Administrative Region, Windhoek Hosea Kutako International Airport, and the country's railhead. Other important towns are:

- Arandis, uranium mine
- Walvis Bay, seaport, international airport, railhead
- Oshakati, main business centre in the North, railhead
- Otjiwarongo, main business centre in Central-North, rail junction
- Lüderitz, sea port, railhead
- Gobabis, farming centre
- Keetmanshoop, railhead
- Tsumeb, mining
- Swakopmund, Tourism (Ex German Colonial town)
- Rundu,
- Katima Mulilo
- Okahandja

== Statistics ==
Location: Southern Africa, bordering the South Atlantic Ocean, between Angola and South Africa

Geographic coordinates: 22°00′S 17°00′E

Area
- Total: 824,292 km^{2}
  - country rank in the world: 34th
- Land: 823,290 km^{2}
- Water: 1,002 km^{2}
Area comparative
- Australia comparative: slightly larger than New South Wales
- Canada comparative: approximately 1/8 smaller than British Columbia
- United States comparative: slightly less than three times the size of Nevada
- EU comparative: slightly less than 2 1/2 times the size of Finland

Land boundaries:
total: 4,220 km
border countries: Angola 1,427 km, Botswana 1,544 km, South Africa 1,005 km, Zambia 244 km

Coastline: 1,572 km

Maritime claims:
territorial sea: 12 nmi (22.2 km; 13.8 mi)
contiguous zone: 24 nmi (44.4 km; 27.6 mi)
exclusive economic zone: 564,748 km^{2} (218,050 mi^{2}) and 200 nmi (370.4 km; 230.2 mi)

Terrain: Mostly high plateau; Namib Desert along the coast; Kalahari Desert in the east. In the north near the border with Angola there is a flat area that has been designated by the World Wildlife Fund as part of the Angolan mopane woodlands ecoregion.

Elevation extremes:
lowest point: Atlantic Ocean 0 m
mean elevation: 1,414 m
highest point: Königstein 2,573 m

Natural resources: diamonds, copper, uranium, gold, silver, lead, tin, lithium, cadmium, tungsten, zinc, salt, hydropower, fish
note: suspected deposits of oil, coal, and iron ore

Land use:
agricultural land: 47.2% (2018)
arable land: 1% (2018)
permanent crops: 0% (2018)
permanent pasture: 46.2% (2018)
forest: 8.8% (2018)
other: 44% (2018)

Irrigated land: 80 km^{2} (2012), 75.73 km^{2} (2003), 70 km^{2} (1998 est.), 60 km^{2} (1993 est.)

Total renewable water resources: 17.72 km^{3} (2011)

Natural hazards: prolonged periods of drought

Environment – current issues: depletion and degradation of water and aquatic resources; desertification; land degradation; loss of biodiversity and biotic resources; wildlife poaching

Environment – international agreements:
party to: Antarctic-Marine Living Resources, Biodiversity, Climate Change, Climate Change-Kyoto Protocol, Desertification, Endangered Species, Hazardous Wastes, Law of the Sea, Ozone Layer Protection, Wetlands

== Extreme points ==
This is a list of the extreme points of Namibia, the points that are farther north, south, east, or west than any other location.

- Northernmost point – unnamed location on the border with Angola in the Kunene River immediately west of the Epupa Falls, Kunene Region
- Easternmost point – the tripoint with Botswana and Zambia, Zambezi Region
- Southernmost point – unnamed location in Pella Drift on the Orange River border with South Africa, ǁKaras Region
- Westernmost point – unnamed section of coast west of the Okotuso well, Kunene Region

== See also ==
- Namibia
- Towns in Namibia
- List of rivers of Africa
- Rivers in Namibia

== Sources ==
- Atlas of Namibia Team, 2022, Atlas of Namibia: its land, water and life, Namibia Nature Foundation, Windhoek
