= Cost of living in Namibia =

The cost of living in Namibia is higher than some other regional cities in the southern region of the African continent. Namibia imports about 50% of its cereal requirements. Many other items used in daily life also need to be imported. High transportation costs make prices very high and unaffordable. Monopolies in some business sectors causes higher profit booking, which also results in raising of prices.

For example, the price (in 2013) of electricity for domestic consumers in Windhoek for post-paid consumers was 1.08 N$ per unit (KWH) added with ECB levy of 0.0150 N$ per unit and NEF levy of 0.0102N$ per unit, with a fixed cost based on load added to the bill. Consumers who have prepaid metering units paid 1.57 N$ per unit of electricity, with an added ECB levy of 0.0150 N$ per unit and NEF levy of 0.0102N$ per unit. The price of gasoline was ~13 N$ per liter, and the price of liquid petroleum gas (LPG) was ~8 N$ per liter. Rent for a family accommodation may exceed 12000 N$ per month in safe urban locations. The price of a 1-litre water bottle is ~15 N$, one litre of UHT Milk is ~15N$, and a raw egg is ~2N$. The cost of 1 kg fresh chicken is around 60N$, while 1 kg frozen chicken is around 45N$. Red meat costs 60-100N$ per kg. The cost of making an international call, other than to a neighbouring country, is 12 N$ per min and internet access over 3G costs over 1 N$ per MB.

== Banking in Namibia ==
The banking sector in Namibia is highly developed with modern infrastructure, such as online banking, cellphone banking etc. The Bank of Namibia (BoN) is the central bank of Namibia, according to the Namibian Constitution, is to "serve as the State’s principal instrument to control the money supply, the currency and the institutions of finance, and to perform all other functions ordinarily performed by a central bank".

This is a list of authorised commercial banks in Namibia

1. Bank Windhoek
2. First National Bank
3. Nedbank
4. Standard Bank

Namibian banks offer wide variety of products like savings accounts, cheque accounts, transmission accounts, investment accounts, credit cards accounts and many types of loan accounts (vehicle Loans, mortgage/housing loans, personal loans etc.) to meet its customer requirements. The money in savings & investment accounts earns interest, while no interest is paid for cheque and transmission accounts. The credit balance in credit card accounts also earn interest. Most of the accounts are subjected to monthly account fees and credit card accounts are subjected to annual fees. There are no reward / loyalty programs for using credit cards in Namibia.

The interest earned in any bank account is subjected to a flat 10% retention as income tax. All debit transactions, including debit card transactions, credit card transactions, at the bank's teller counter transactions & online banking transactions are also subjected to a government duty of 0.2N$ per transaction.

The bank's charges are applicable for cash handling transactions such as cash deposits and cash withdrawal at bank's teller counter (for certain savings account, the cash deposits up to only 1000 N$/Months are exempted from this fee). Bank's charges are also applicable for each transaction carried out by internet banking or by debit cards, which are significantly lower than "at the counter transactions".

Taking a cash or personal loan from a financial institution in Namibia is particularly very expensive because the loan repayment includes several fees such as stamp duties, Namfisa charges, credit life insurance, administration fees, finance charges and Value Added Tax (VAT)". The banking business in Namibia is one of the most profitable business and banks are making hundreds of millions out of a tiny 2.1 million Namibian population.

The cross-border money transfer facilities are limited to major bank in towns. The money transfer to countries outside of common monetary area is particularly very expensive because of high banks commission and one of the poorest currency buying & selling rates. The bank's commission is applicable to both inward and outward remittance. Cross border foreign currency bank cheque and bank draft have been abolished. SWIFT is the preferred method for cross border remittance by banks. Further, in an effort to curb money laundering and to protect the country's foreign exchange reserves, exchange control regulation is applied to all outward remittances. An expatriate employee in Namibia is only allowed send a certain percentage of their net earning back to their home country. In terms of exchange control regulations, every person who contravenes or fails to comply with any provision of these regulations shall be guilty of an offence and liable upon conviction to a fine not exceeding N$250000 or to imprisonment for a period not exceeding five years (5) or both.

== Working and living in Namibia ==
With 29.6% unemployment, the government is unenthusiastic about letting people in from foreign countries who would take jobs from Namibians. All semi-skilled and unskilled positions must be unconditionally filled by local Namibians.

It is possible to get a work permit to volunteer, though this requires going through the same drawn-out process as the normal work permit. Any person who contravenes or fails to comply with any provision of his/her residence permit conditions shall be guilty of an offence and liable upon conviction to a fine not exceeding N$12000 or to imprisonment for a period not exceeding two years (2) or both.

An employee's salary is normally paid in Namibian dollars, which is the local currency and income tax (maximum rate is 37% and is based on different income slabs) is deducted by the employer. One Namibian dollar (NAD) is always equal to one South African rand (ZAR). One United States dollar (1 US$ or US$1) = 14.50 Namibian Dollar (N$ or NAD).

== Schooling in Namibia ==
There are government schools all around the country, private schools (mostly located in towns) and one international school in the capital city Windhoek. Primary education at government schools is free of charge as of 2013, and secondary education since 2016. Tertiary educational institutions, both private and public, charge tuition fees.

== See also ==
- Taxation in Namibia
- Economy of Namibia
