= List of ecoregions in Namibia =

The following is a list of ecoregions in Namibia, according to the Worldwide Fund for Nature (WWF).

== Terrestrial ecoregions ==
by major habitat type

=== Tropical and subtropical grasslands, savannas, and shrublands ===
- Angolan mopane woodlands
- Kalahari Acacia-Baikiaea woodlands
- Zambezian Baikiaea woodlands
- Zambezian and mopane woodlands

=== Flooded grasslands and savannas ===
- Etosha Pan halophytics
- Zambezian flooded grasslands

=== Deserts and xeric shrublands ===
- Kalahari xeric savanna
- Kaokoveld desert
- Nama Karoo
- Namib desert
- Namibian savanna woodlands
- Succulent Karoo

== Freshwater ecoregions ==
by bioregion

=== Zambezi ===
- Etosha
- Kalahari
- Karstveld Sink Holes
- Namib Coastal
- Zambezi
  - Upper Zambezi Floodplains
- Okavango Floodplains

== Marine ecoregions ==
- Namaqua
- Namib
