= Wildlife of Namibia =

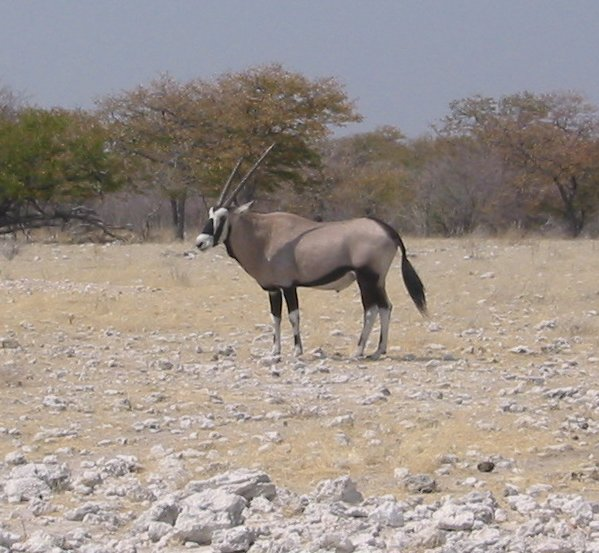
Gemsbok

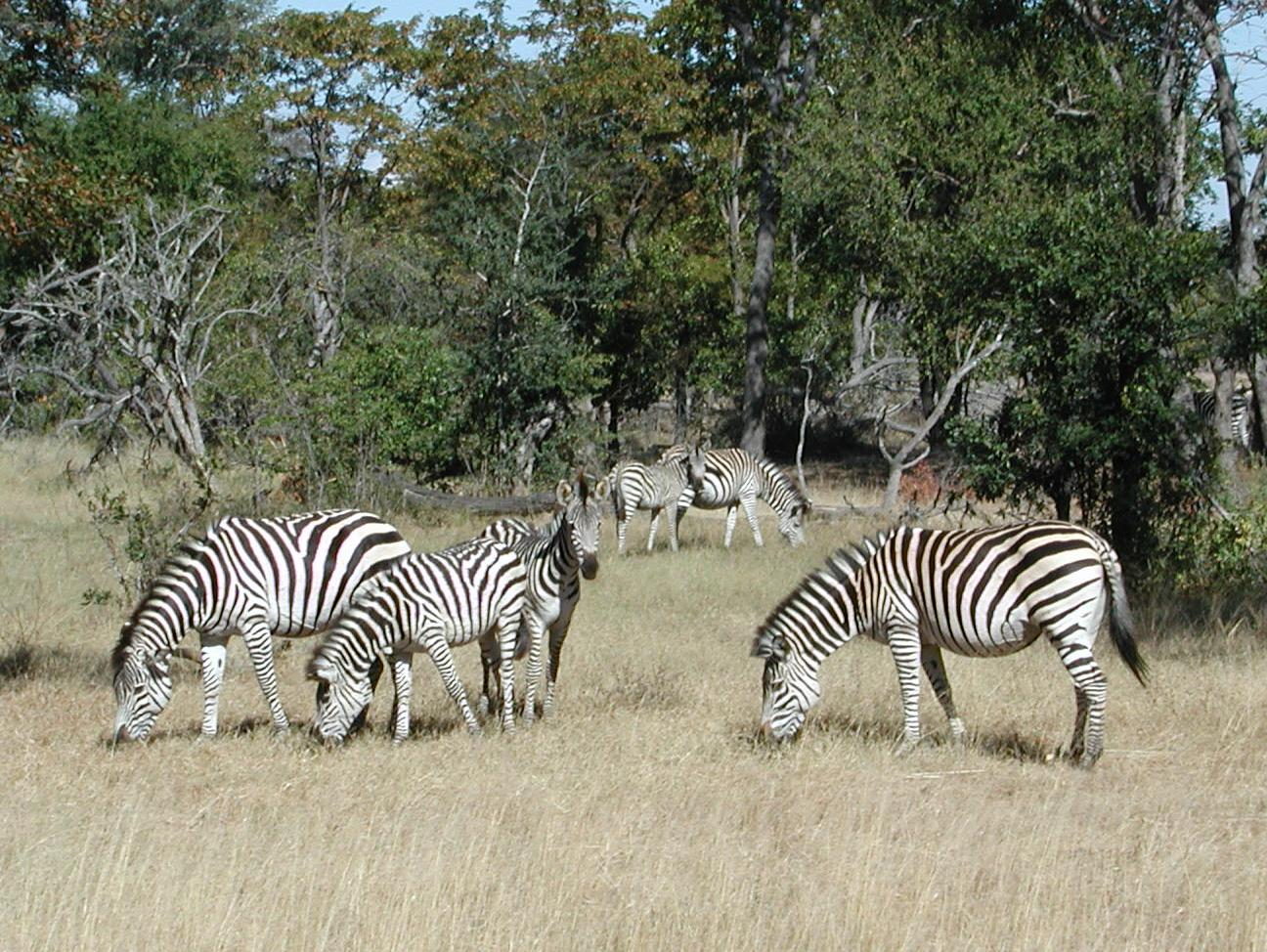
Plains zebra

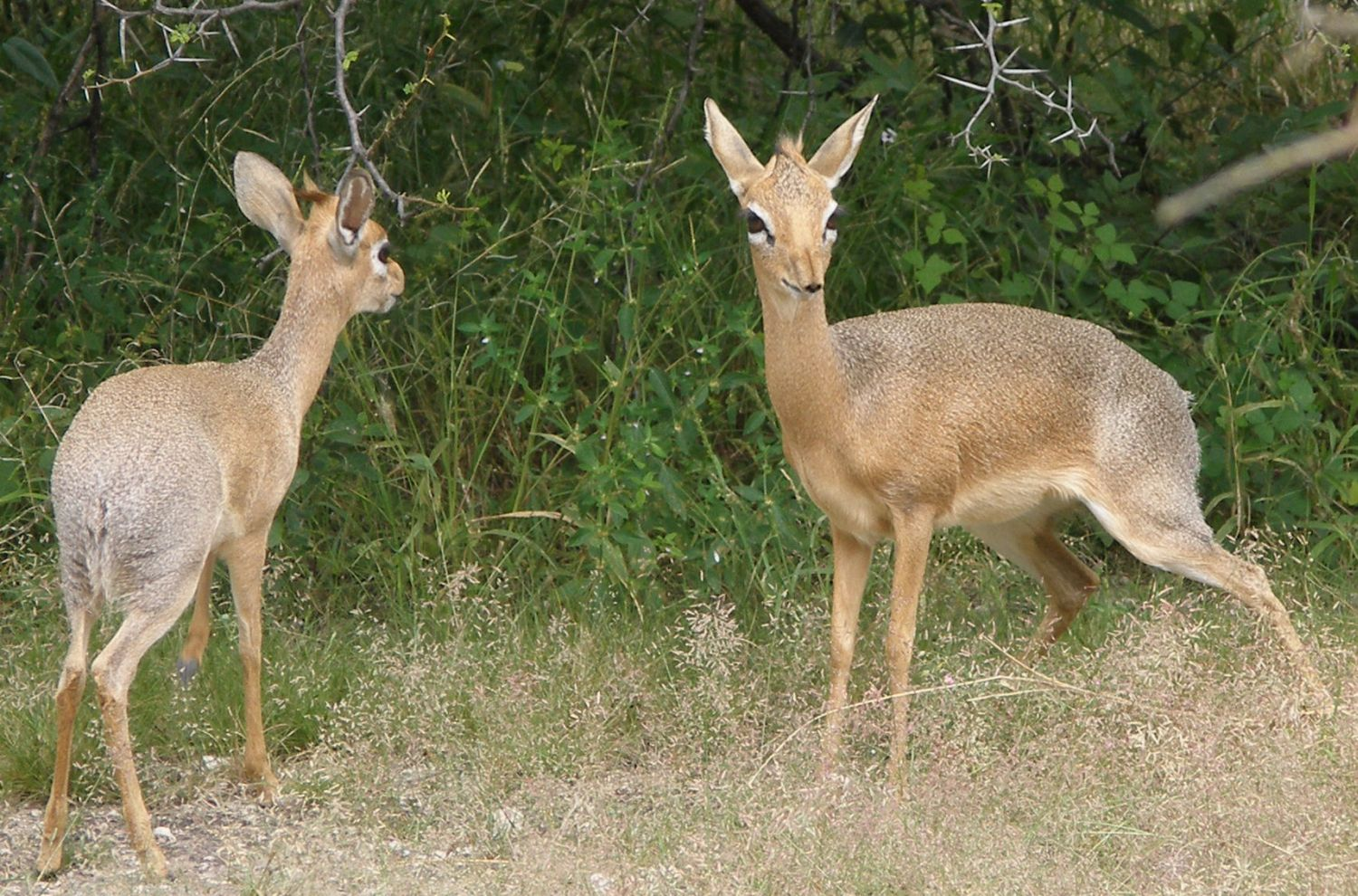
Kirk's dik-dik

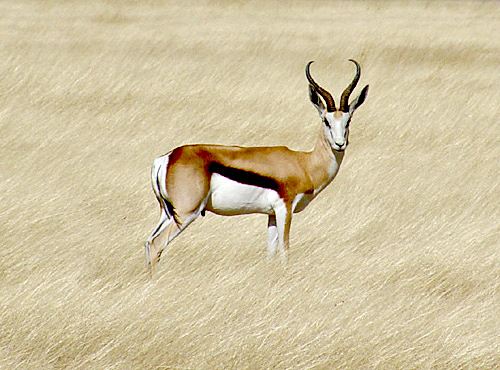
Springbok antelope

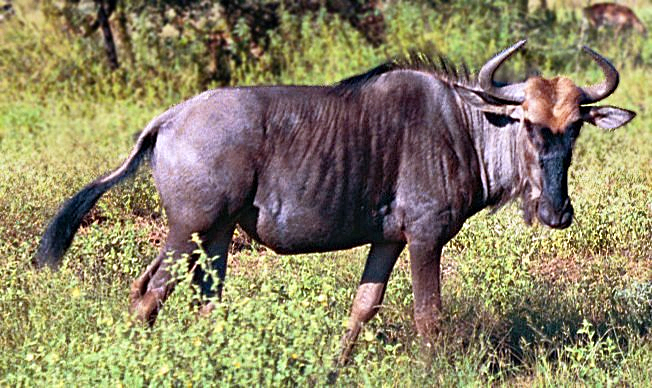
Wildebeest

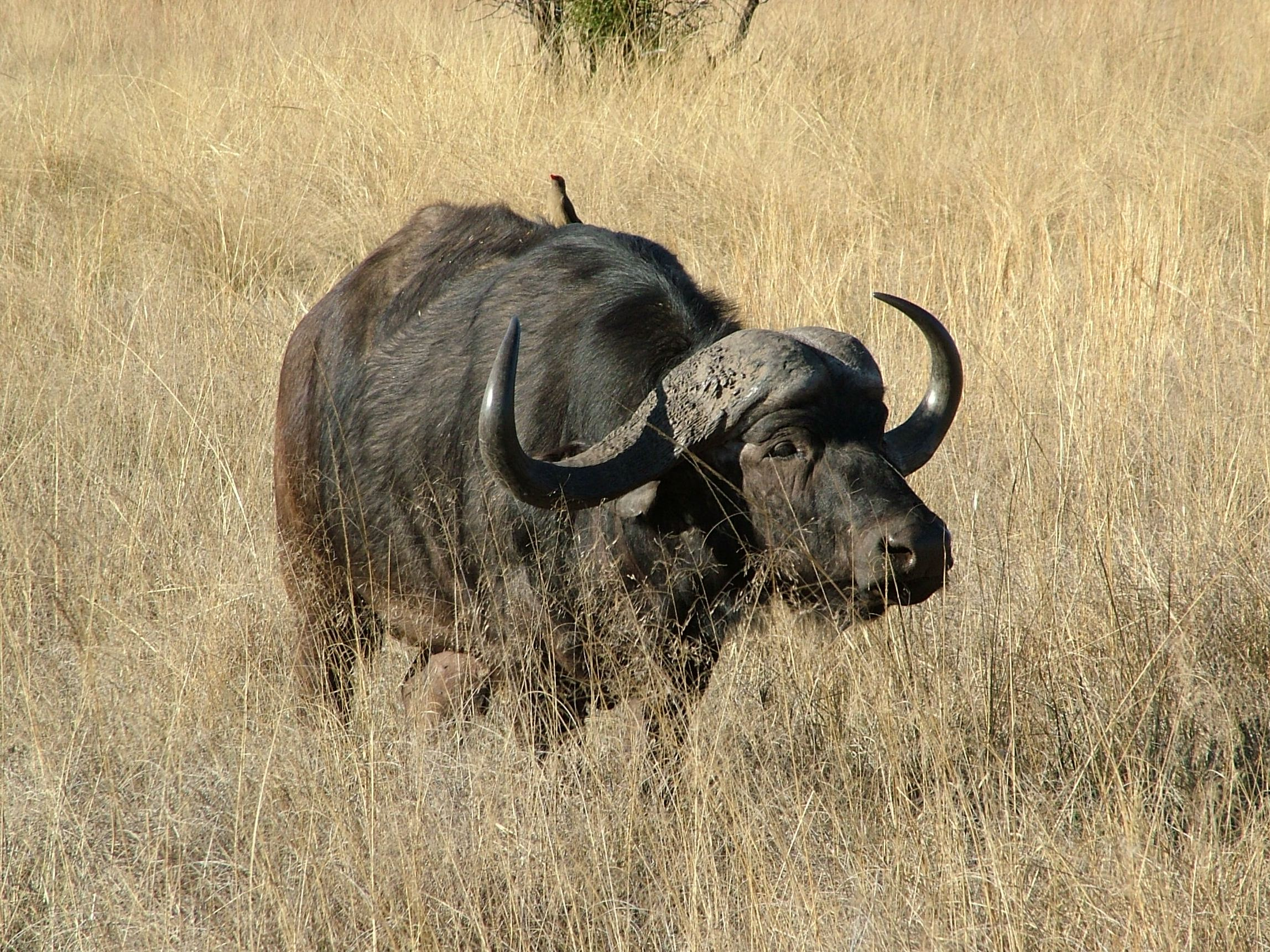
African buffalo

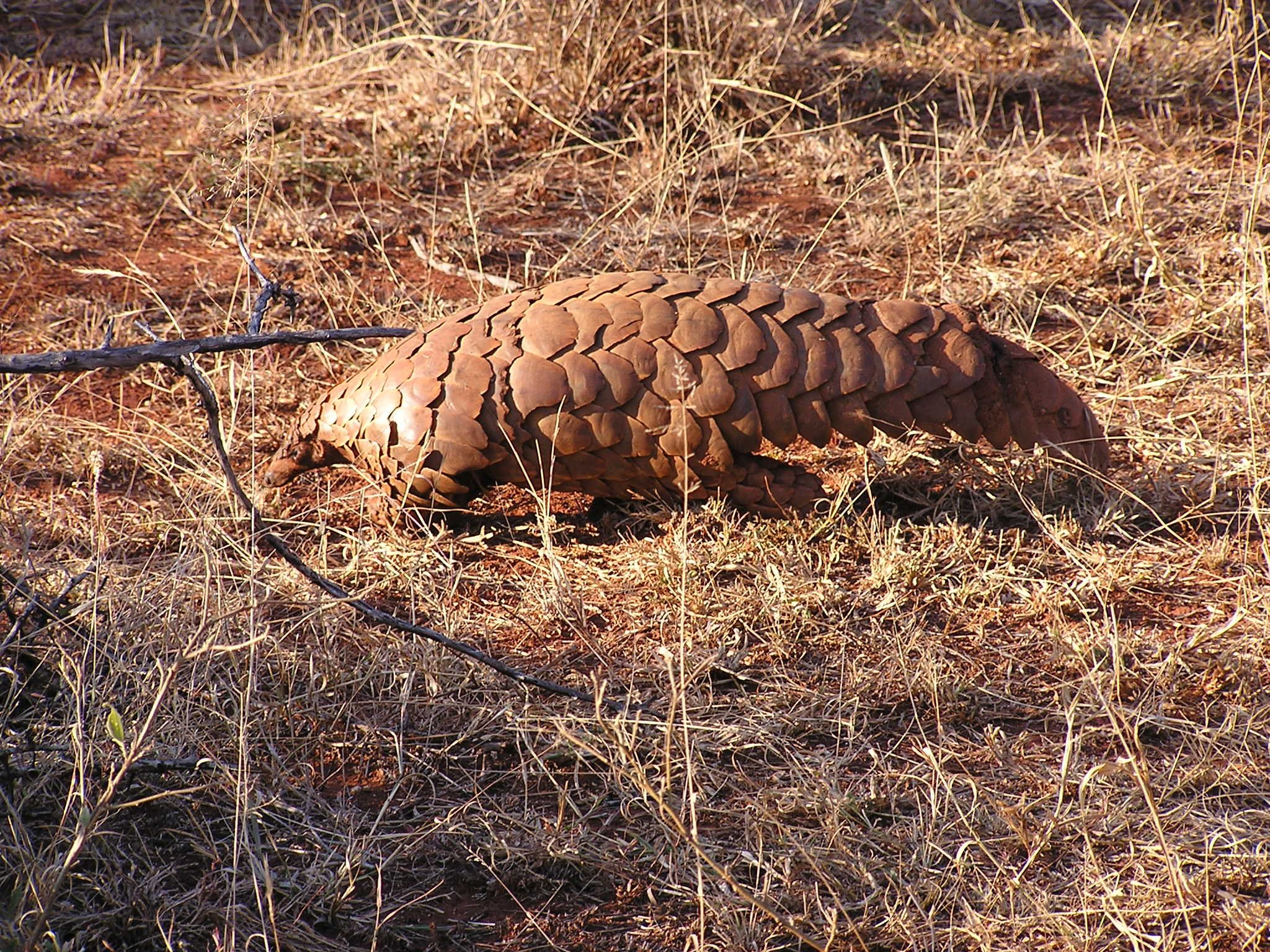
Ground pangolin

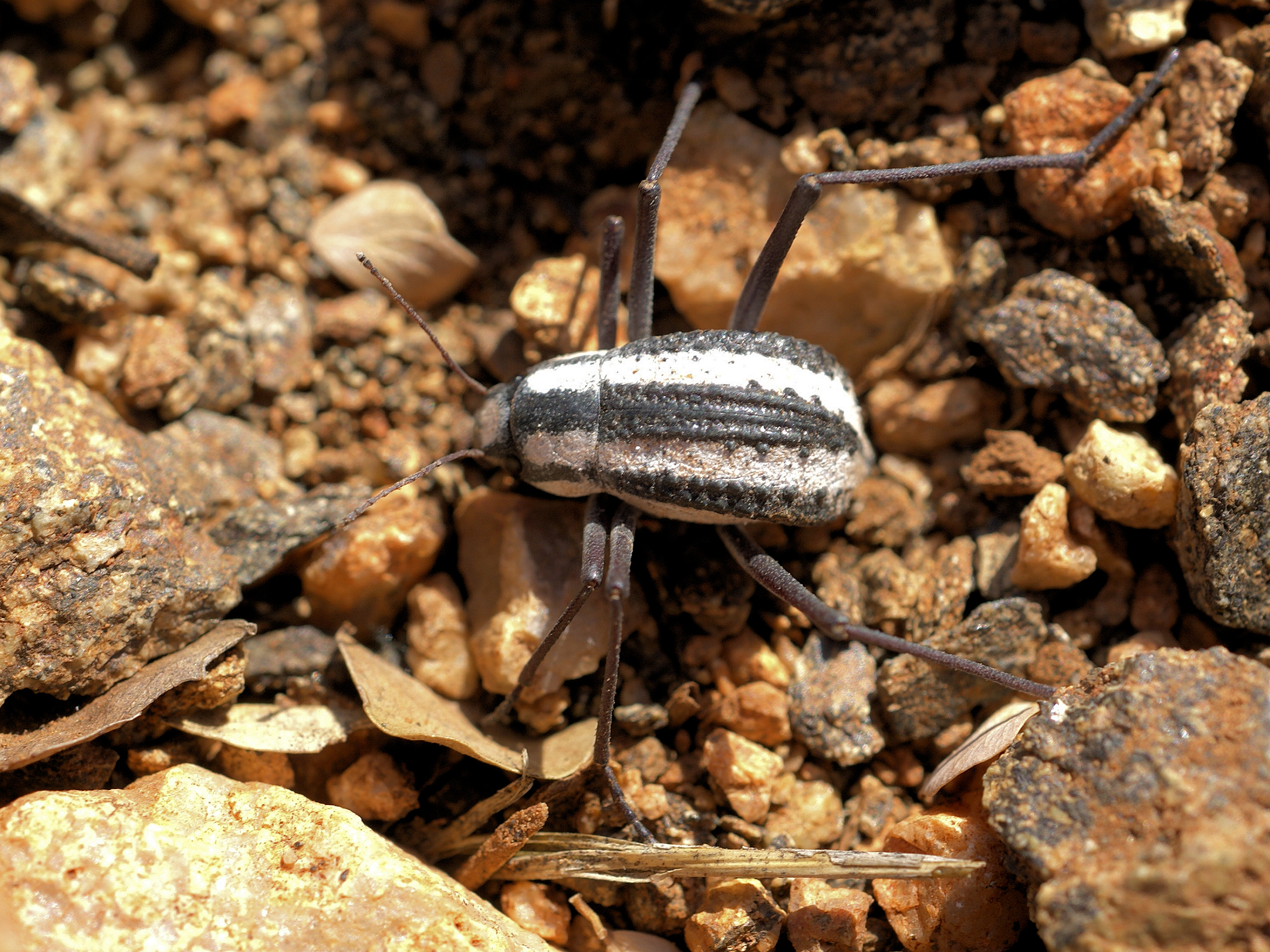
Namib Desert beetle

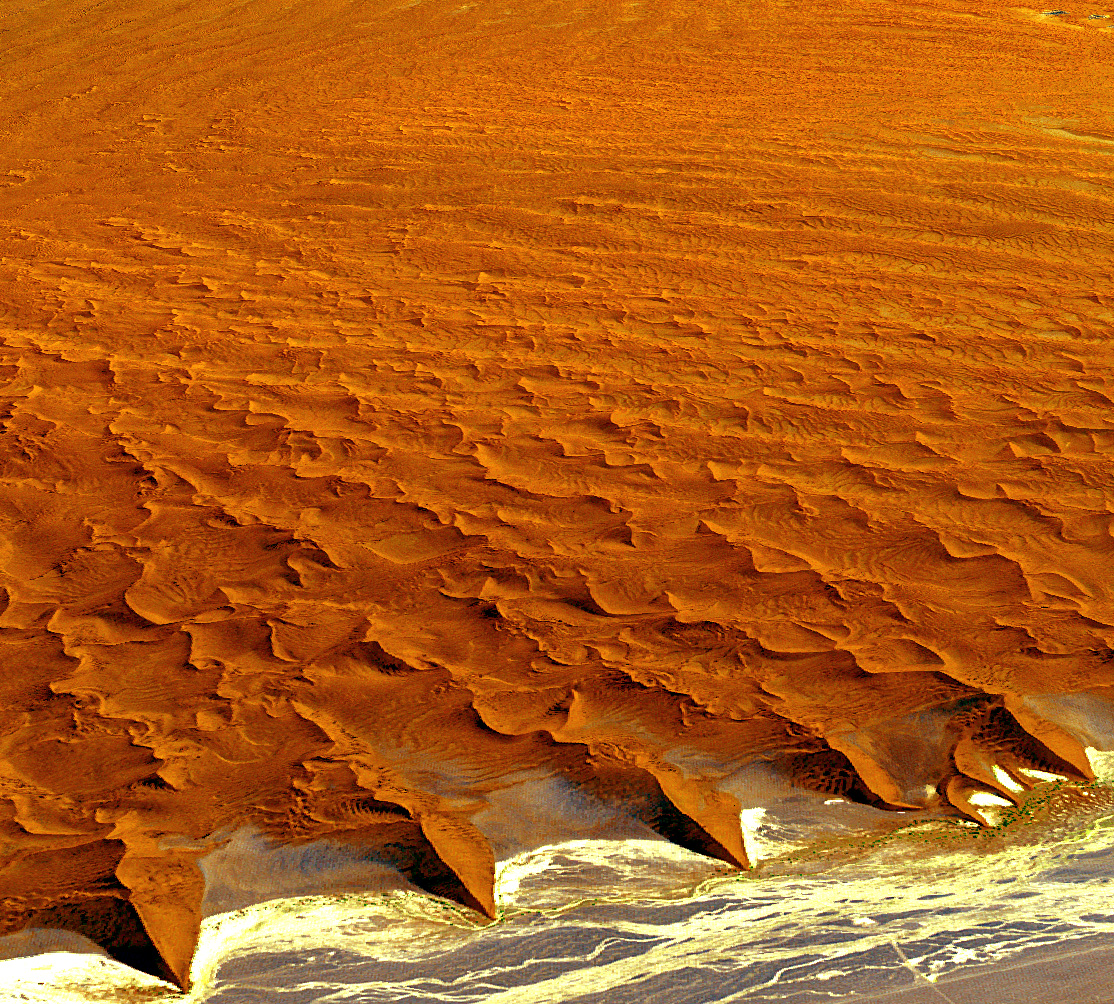
High dunes in the Namib Desert

The wildlife of Namibia is composed of its flora and fauna. Namibia's endangered species include the wild dog, black rhino, oribi and puku.

== Endangered species ==
Namibia has many endangered species within its national parks and wildlife resorts. The puku antelope is limited to about 100 individuals along the Chobe River in Botswana and the Linyati marshes in Namibia. The black rhino and white rhino have suffered the most from poaching and are on the verge of extinction. If there had been no effort to save them in the last 20 years they most likely would have disappeared. While both species occur naturally in Namibia, in many of the reserves they have been reintroduced. The country also has the largest population in southern Africa of cheetahs not contained within national parks. There are over twenty species of antelope ranging from the largest, the eland, to the smallest, the Damara dik-dik. The gemsbok, a striking antelope with long symmetrical horns and distinctive black and white markings, is featured on the Namibian coat of arms. Namibia also harbours a wealth of small mammals including mongoose, jackal as well as the less common antbear and honey badger, both solitary and nocturnal.

== National parks and nature reserves ==
Namibia's parks and reserves range from the open bush of the centre and the north where wildlife is relatively plentiful, to the barren and inhospitable coastal strip with its huge sand dunes. The three main tourist attractions for wildlife in Namibia are Etosha National Park, Waterberg National Park and Cape Cross Seal Reserve.

=== National parks ===
- Ai-Ais/Richtersveld Transfrontier Park (see also Fish River Canyon and Ai-Ais Hot Springs)
- Bwabwata National Park
- Etosha National Park
- Khaudum National Park
- Mudumu National Park
- Namib-Naukluft National Park
- Nkasa Rupara National Park
- Skeleton Coast National Park
- Waterberg National Park

=== Nature reserves ===
- Kaokoland Nature Reserve
- Khaudum Nature Reserve
- Mamili Nature Reserve
- Mudumu Nature Reserve

== Fauna ==
Namibia has 115 species of fish (five endemic). There are about 50 species of frogs (six endemic) but neither caecilians nor salamanders. Namibia is home to 250 species of reptiles with 59 endemic. There were 1331 recorded species of arachnids with 164 endemic but there are potentially 5650 species. Records show 6331 species of insects (1541 of them are endemic). but there are expected to be 35,000 species of insects.

=== Freshwater insects ===
- 19 species of Ephemeroptera
- 2 species of Plecoptera
- 35 species of Trichoptera
- 77 species of Odonata
- 179 species of Diptera
- 1 species of Neuroptera
- 200 species of Coleoptera
- 45 species of Hemiptera
- 7 species of Orthoptera

=== Freshwater invertebrates ===
- 3 species of Porifera
- 2 species of Cnidaria
- 9 species of Platyhelminthes
- 5 species of Ectoprocta
- 10 species of Nematoda
- 13 species of Oligochaeta
- 16 species of Hirudinea
- 52 species of Ostracoda
- 19 species of Copepoda
- Branchiopoda
  - 19 species of Anostraca
  - 19 species of Cladocera
  - 2 species of Notostraca
  - 15 species of Conchostraca
- Malacostraca
  - 6 species of Amphipoda
  - 4 species of Isopoda
  - 6 species of Decapoda

=== Terrestrial invertebrates ===
- 25 species of Diplopoda

=== Mammals ===
200 species of terrestrial mammals (14 of them are endemic) and 40 species of marine mammals are native to Namibia.

=== Birds ===
There are 645 species of birds (14 of them are endemic).

=== Mollusks ===
There were 26 species of freshwater snails recorded and 13 species of freshwater bivalves. A number of land gastropods are also found in Namibia.

== Flora ==
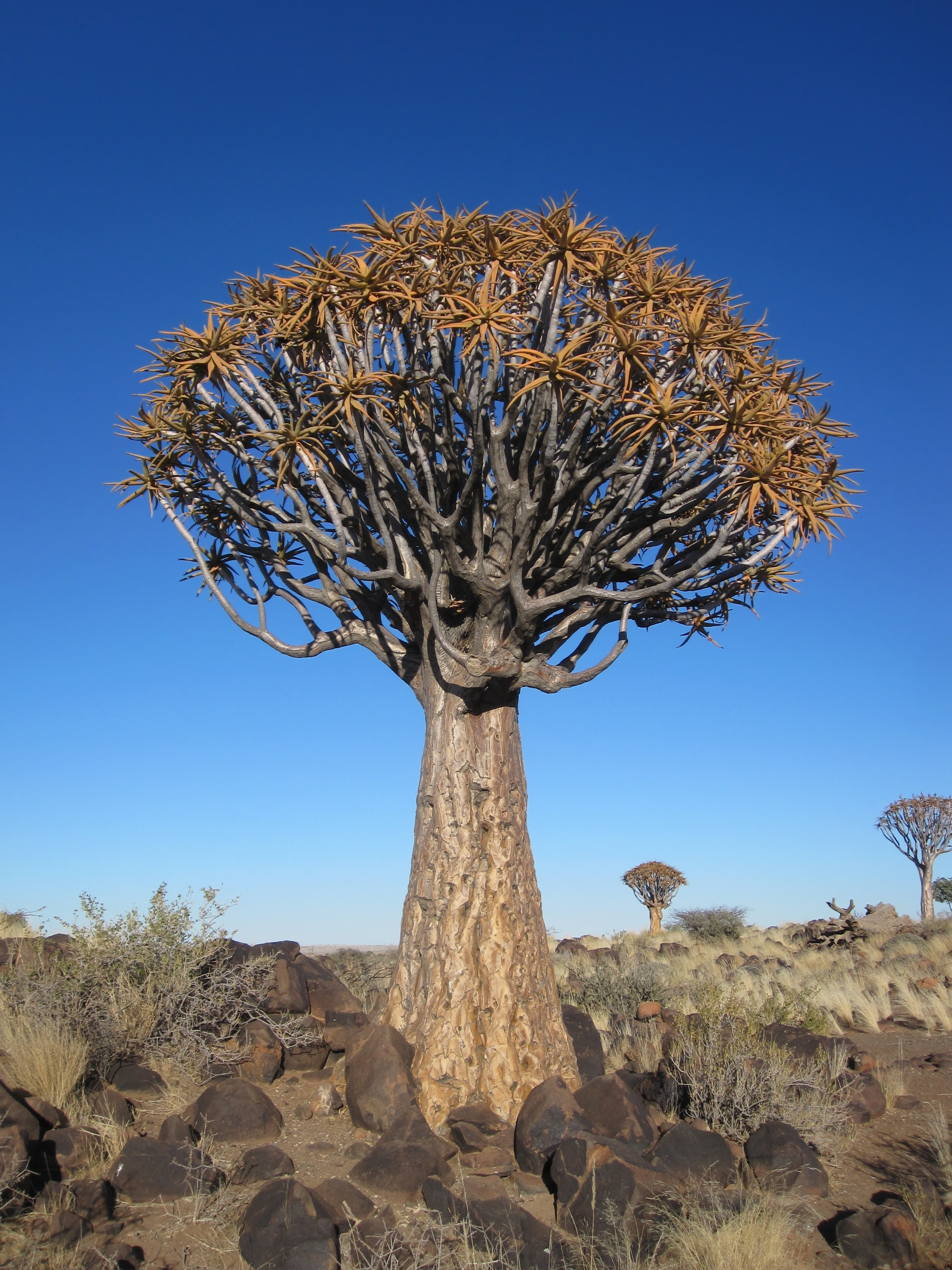
Aloidendron dichotomum, in Namibia

There are 4334 species of plants recorded (683 of them are endemic).

- Senecio haworthii - woolly senecio
- Aloidendron dichotomum - quiver tree
- Welwitschia mirabilis
