= Spreetshoogte Pass =

Mountain pass in central Namibia

Coordinates: 23°38′00″S 16°11′00″E

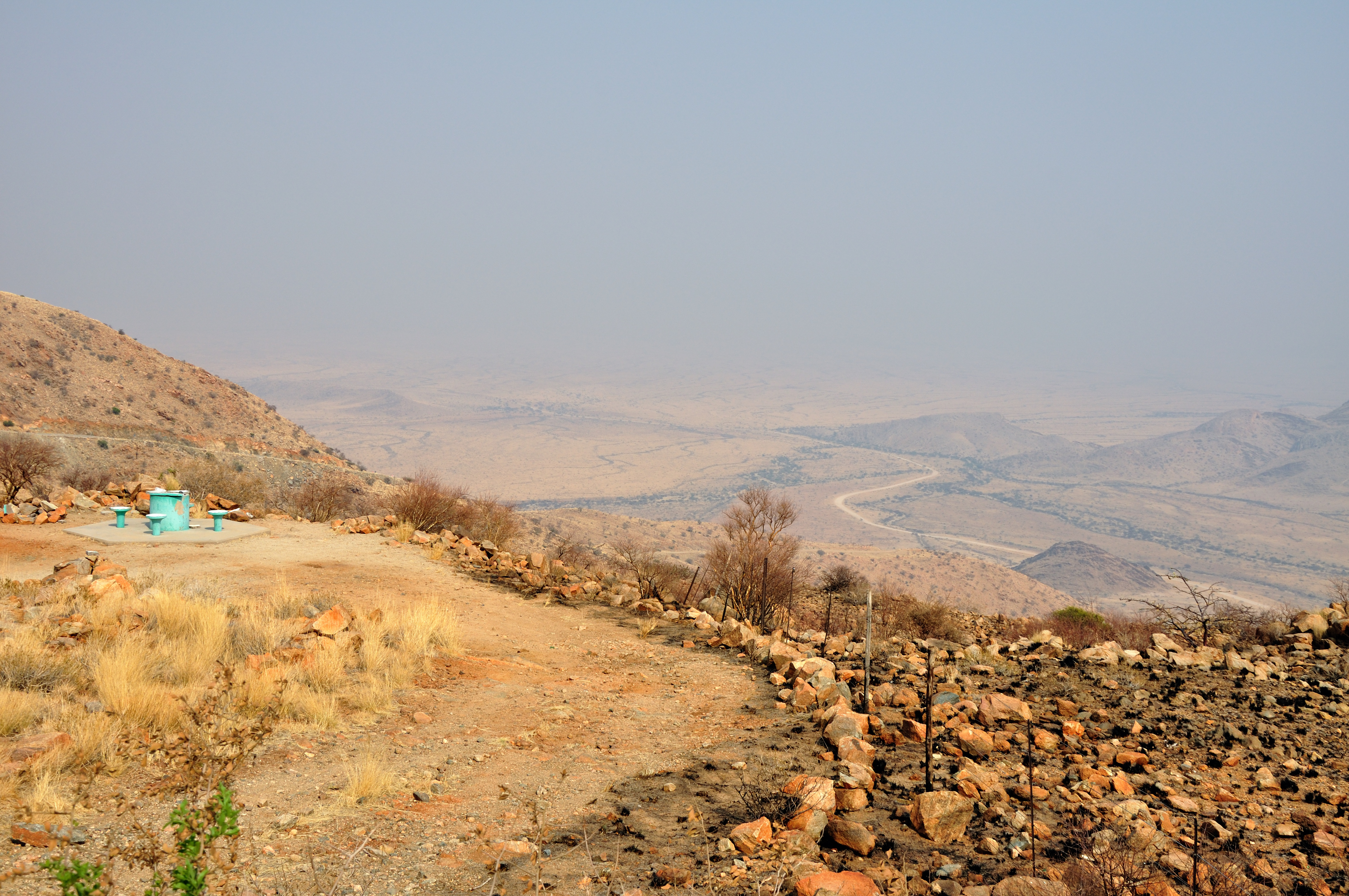
Public viewpoint on top of the pass

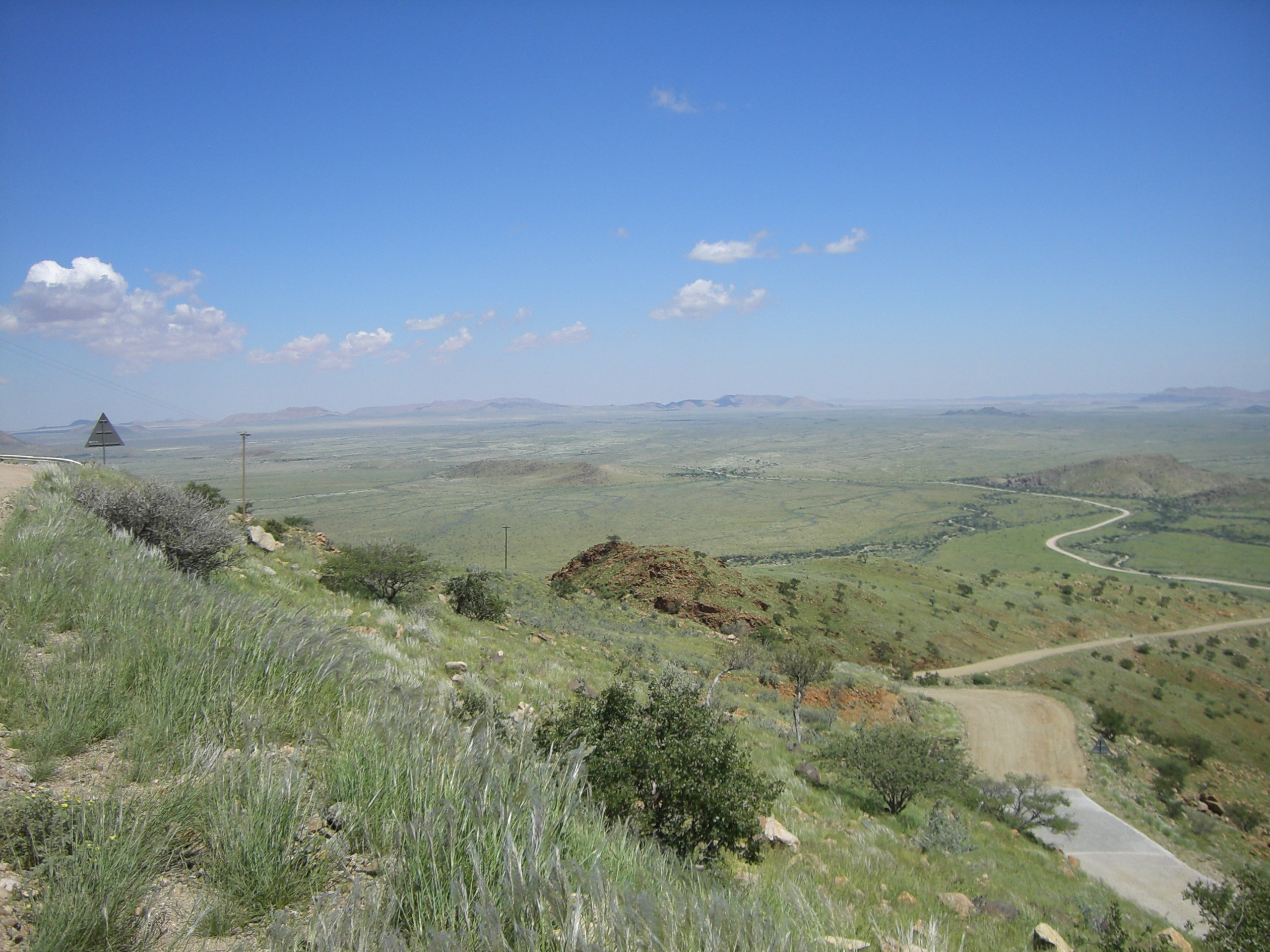
View into Namib Desert from halfway down the pass at the end of the 2006 raining season

Spreetshoogte Pass (Afrikaans: Spreetshoogtepas, literally English: Spreeth's Peak Pass) is a mountain pass in central Namibia, connecting the Namib Desert with the Khomas Highland by traversing the Great Escarpment, a geological feature of much of the southern part of the African continent. With gradients between 1:4.5 and 1:6 it is the steepest pass in Namibia, as well as the one straddling the biggest elevation difference, descending from an altitude of 1,822 metres (5,978 ft) almost 1,000 metres (3,300 ft) within 4 kilometres (2.5 mi) of road. The top of the pass features a rest place from which there are views into the adjacent Namib.

The pass was erected during World War II by farmer Nicolaas Spreeth, after whom it is named. Spreeth owned the farm Ubib just at the foot of the escarpment. Whenever goods were delivered to his farm they would be dropped at a bus stop at farm Namibgrens (English: Namib border) on top of the mountain. To gather them the choice was to either travel via Remhoogte Pass approximately 30 kilometres (19 mi) southwards, or to trek uphill along existing Zebra paths.

Spreeth decided to do the latter, fortifying the path with quartzite rocks whenever he undertook the journey. Soon the bright white rocks formed a line that could be spotted from a distance. Spreeth even catered for motor vehicles (not very strong at that time), placing long, flat patches of road ahead of every steep ascent. He built the pass literally with his own hands. To flatten obstacles he used dynamite.

The pass today is part of the district road D1275 from Rehoboth to Solitaire, passable only for vehicles without trailers. Except for a few interlocked sections, the road is unpaved. Trucks and caravans are forbidden to use it. Even trucks and graders of Namibia's Roads Authority only drive uphill when maintaining this stretch of road, and return via the Remhoogte Pass nearby, in order to keep the danger of failing brakes to a minimum.
