= Prostitution in Namibia =

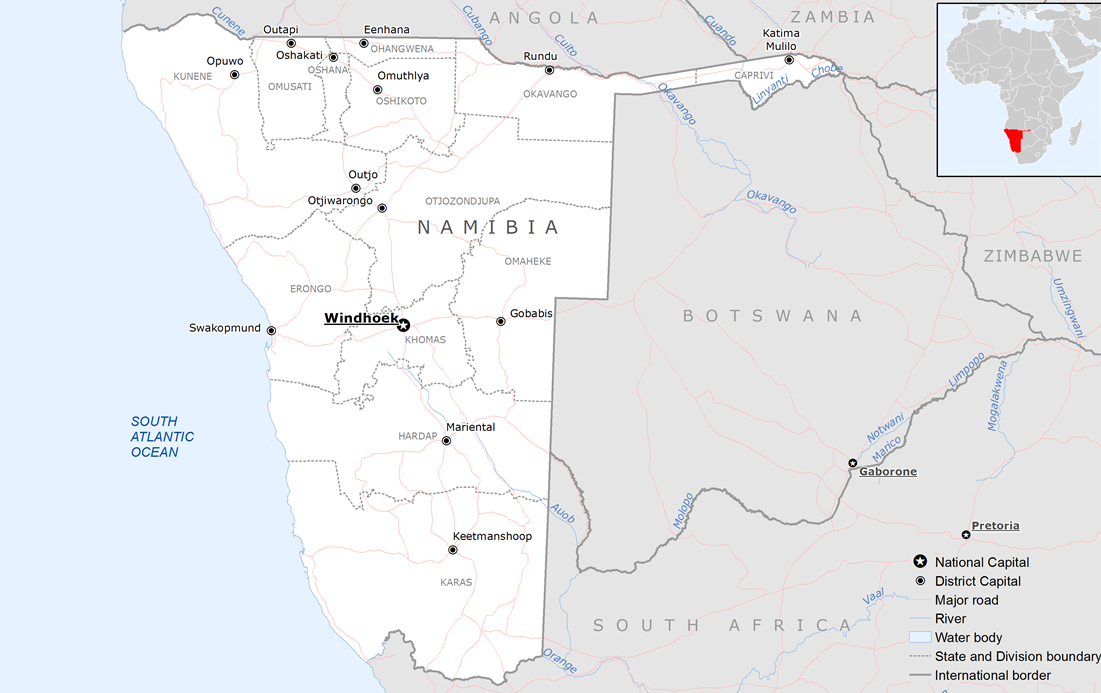
Map of Namibia

Prostitution in Namibia is legal, but related activities such as solicitation, procuring and operating a brothel are illegal. Bylaws on public disorder and loitering are frequently used to prosecute sex workers. Sex workers in Namibia are highly stigmatized, lack access to health care, and face significant levels of violence and police abuse.

Reported police abuses include the confiscation of condoms, arbitrary detention, violence, rape, and extortion. According to a 2016 report, 65% of sex workers had been arrested within the previous 12 month for reasons including soliciting clients, stealing from a client, being a sex worker, and carrying a condom. To prevent arrest, 74% of the sex workers had sex with a police officer.

Prostitution is a highly prevalent practice, particularly in border areas, transport corridors, Walvis Bay and the capital, Windhoek. Estimates place the number sex workers in Namibia around 11,000, 10% of whom are male or transgender sex workers.

Human trafficking, child prostitution and HIV/AIDS remain serious issues in the country.

== Overview ==
Most prostitutes are Namibian, but there are also a significant number from Zambia, Botswana and Angola.

Most prostitutes work independently and meet their clients either on the street or in bars. Bars often have rooms on the premises for the prostitutes to use, and brothels usually have a bar, which blurs the line between a bar and a brothel. Some higher-end sex workers are contacted by cell phone or the Internet, and work in high-end clubs and hotels.

Many clients are reluctant to use condoms, and offer to pay more for unprotected sex. Condoms may be difficult to obtain, and police have been reported to confiscate them as evidence of prostitution.

Child prostitution remains a concern, particularly in Walvis Bay and Windhoek.

== History ==
=== German rule ===
In 1899, regulations around brothels using white prostitutes were drawn up in Swakopmund. This allowed the authorities to monitor the sexual health of the prostitutes and was designed to control the spread of sexually transmitted infections (STIs). Colonial authorities believed unregulated African prostitutes were the main source of STIs. Other towns subsequently introduced similar regulations, including Okahandja, Karibib, Windhoek, Keetmanshoop, Luderitz, Tsumeb and Seeheim. The use of white prostitutes was encouraged to try to prevent relationships between white men and African women. There is evidence that some of the white prostitutes had been trafficked into the country.

After the Herero Wars, the German military set up a brothel in Windhoek for their troops. Although some indigenous women volunteered to work in the brothel, others were forced to work there.

Although white men seeing African prostitutes was discouraged, it was tolerated throughout this era.

=== South African Rule ===
Prostitution was not made illegal, but the Undesirables Removal Proclamation (1920) was used to expel most of the white prostitutes and brothel keepers back to Germany. Also introduced in 1920 was the Police Offences Proclamation, which criminalised loitering and solicitation for the purpose of prostitution. There were concerns about child prostitution, and in 1921 the Girls' and Mentally Defective Women's Protection Proclamation was introduced which set the age of consent at 16.

Prostitution was blamed by the authorities for African women migration to the cities from rural areas. A new regulation was introduced in 1938 requiring all "native females" in Windhoek between 18 and 60, unless legally married and living with their husbands, to undergo a medical examination every 6 months. After violent protests in March 1939 the regulation was withdrawn.

== Legal situation ==
The Combating of Immoral Practices Act (Act 21 of 1980) is the main piece of legislation controlling prostitution in Namibia. The main provisions are the prohibiting of third party involvement:

- to solicit in a public street or place
- to exhibit oneself in an indecent dress or manner in public view
- to commit "any immoral act" with another person in public (but not in private)
- to keep a brothel
- to "procure" any female to have unlawful carnal intercourse with another person, to become a prostitute, or to "become an inmate of a brothel"
- to entice a female to a brothel for the purpose of prostitution
- to knowingly live wholly or in part on the earnings of prostitution
- to assist in bringing about "the commission by any person of any immoral act with another person"
- to detain a female against her will in a brothel

Windhoek has Municipal Street and Traffic Regulations which prohibit loitering and soliciting.

In case law it has been established that a prostitute working on her own in a house is not keeping a brothel, and that living on the earnings of prostitution does not apply to the prostitute themselves.

Public order offences are also used against sex workers.

=== Legalisation discussion ===
A number of prominent groups have called for the legalization or decriminalization of prostitution. In 2008, the Legal Assistance Centre, a Windhoek-based non-profit human rights organisation, called for the decriminalization of prostitution as a means of cutting the country's high HIV-AIDS rate as well as a means for maintaining the human rights of the prostitute themselves. Rights not Rescue, a sex workers organisation is amongst those calling for decriminalization.

Many groups in Namibia actively oppose legalization and instead focus on providing skills to former sex workers. Some groups approach the issue from a religious perspective, arguing that Namibia's population is overwhelmingly Christian and therefore should not accept what they consider an immoral profession.

Discussions in Parliament are usually controversial. An outspoken proponent of legalisation is Kazenambo Kazenambo, until 2015 Minister of Youth.

== HIV ==
HIV/AIDS in Namibia is a critical public health issue. The prevalence of HIV in Namibia is among the highest in the world. Since 1996, HIV has been the leading cause of death in the country. Sex workers are a high risk group. Some sources put the HIV prevalence amongst sex workers as high as 70%. Reluctance to use condoms, lack of sexual health education and limited access to healthcare are cited as contributory factors.

== Sex trafficking ==
Namibia is a source and destination country for children, and to a lesser extent women, subjected to sex trafficking. Namibian children are subjected to sex trafficking in Windhoek and Walvis Bay. A 2015 media report alleged foreign sex tourists from southern Africa and Europe exploit child sex trafficking victims. In 2014, an NGO reported persons in prostitution, some of whom may have been trafficking victims, were taken aboard foreign vessels off the Namibian coast. Children from less affluent neighbouring countries may be subjected to sex trafficking.

The United States Department of State Office to Monitor and Combat Trafficking in Persons ranks Namibia as a Tier 2 country.

== Sources ==
- Rights not Rescue: Female, Male, and Trans Sex Workers' Human Rights in Botswana, Namibia, and South Africa. Open Society Institute 2009
