= Taxation in Namibia =

In 2026, Namibia had a million registered tax payers. International taxation contributed N$30 billion, the largest part of the budget of the Government of Namibia.

== Income Tax ==
Personal income tax is applicable to total taxable income of an individual, and all individuals are taxed at progressive marginal rates over a series of income brackets. The tax year runs from 1 March to 28 February. Tax rates since the 2024/2025 fiscal year are:

| Taxable amount | Rates of tax |
|---|---|
| Not more than N$100,000 | 0% |
| between N$100,001 and N$150,000 | 18% of the amount by which the taxable amount exceeds N$100,000 |
| between N$150,001 and N$350,000 | N$9,000 + 25% of the amount by which the taxable amount exceeds N$100,000 |
| between N$350,001 and N$550,000 | N$59,000 + 28% of the amount by which the taxable amount exceeds N$350,000 |
| between N$550,001 and N$850,000 | N$115,000 + 30% of the amount by which the taxable amount exceeds N$350,000 |
| between N$850,001 and N$1,550,000 | N$205,000 + 32% of the amount by which the taxable amount exceeds N$100,000 |
| N$1,550,001 or more | N$429,000 + 37% of the amount by which the taxable amount exceeds N$1,550,000 |

Only a small fraction of the Namibian population pays income tax. In the 2023 national census, 547,000 individuals responded that they are employed, and most earned far less than the tax-free threshold. A local analysis from 2025 estimated that no more than 115,000 individuals, or 3.8% of the population, reach an income of more than N$100,000. In 2025, income tax contributed N$20 billion to the government budget.

== Value Added Tax ==
A 15% Value added tax (VAT) is applicable to almost every commodity. Basic commodities like sugar, bread etc. are exempted from VAT. In 2025, VAT contributed N$20 billion to the government budget.

== See also ==
- Cost of Living in Namibia
- Economy of Namibia
