= International rankings of Namibia =

This is a list of international rankings of Namibia.

== Politics ==
- Reporters Without Borders 2013 Press Freedom Index ranked 19 out of 179
- 2008 Ibrahim Index of African Governance ranked 6 out of 53 African countries
- Transparency International: 2013 Corruption Perceptions Index ranked 57 out of 177

== Technology ==
- World Intellectual Property Organization: Global Innovation Index 2026, ranked 102 out of 139
