= List of diplomatic missions of Namibia =

This is a list of diplomatic missions of Namibia. The sparsely populated, but comparatively affluent, southern African nation of Namibia has a modest number of diplomatic missions abroad.

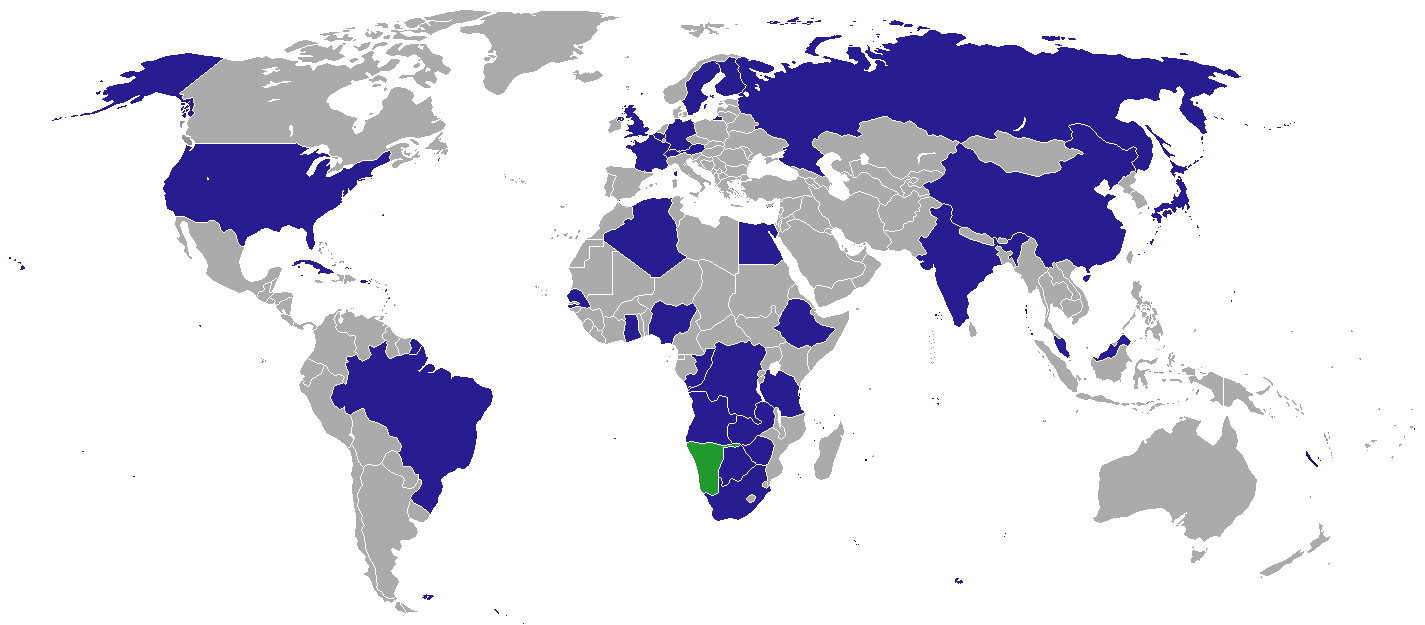
Map of Namibian diplomatic missions

== Africa ==
Host country	Host city	Mission	Concurrent accreditation	Ref.
Algeria	Algiers	Embassy	Countries: Lebanon; Libya; Mauritania; Niger; Sahrawi Republic; Tunisia	
Angola	Luanda	Embassy	Countries: Cape Verde; São Tomé and Príncipe	
Angola	Menongue	Consulate-General	Countries: Cape Verde; São Tomé and Príncipe	
Angola	Ondjiva	Consulate-General	Countries: Cape Verde; São Tomé and Príncipe	
Botswana	Gaborone	High Commission	International Organizations: Southern African Development Community	
Congo-Brazzaville	Brazzaville	Embassy	Countries: Equatorial Guinea; Gabon	
Congo-Kinshasa	Kinshasa	Embassy	Countries: Central African Republic	
Congo-Kinshasa	Lubumbashi	Consulate-General	Countries: Central African Republic	
Egypt	Cairo	Embassy	Countries: Eritrea; Kuwait; Palestine; Qatar; Saudi Arabia; United Arab Emirates; Yemen	
Ethiopia	Addis Ababa	Embassy	Countries: Djibouti; South Sudan; Sudan; International Organizations: African Union	
Ghana	Accra	High Commission	Countries: Benin; Burkina Faso; Ivory Coast; Liberia; Sierra Leone; Togo	
Nigeria	Abuja	High Commission	Countries: Cameroon; Chad; International Organizations: Economic Community of West African States	
Senegal	Dakar	Embassy	Countries: Gambia; Guinea; Guinea-Bissau; Mali	
South Africa	Pretoria	High Commission	Countries: Eswatini; Lesotho; Mauritius; Madagascar; Seychelles	
South Africa	Cape Town	Consulate-General	Countries: Eswatini; Lesotho; Mauritius; Madagascar; Seychelles	
Tanzania	Dar es Salaam	High Commission	Countries: Burundi; Comoros; Kenya; Rwanda; Somalia; Uganda; International Organizations: East African Community; United Nations; United Nations Environment Programme; United Nations Human Settlements Programme	
Zambia	Lusaka	High Commission		
Zimbabwe	Harare	Embassy	Countries: Mozambique	

== Americas ==
Host country	Host city	Mission	Concurrent accreditation	Ref.
Brazil	Brasília	Embassy	Countries: Argentina; Bolivia; Chile; Colombia; Ecuador; Paraguay; Peru; Suriname; Uruguay	
Cuba	Havana	Embassy	Countries: Dominican Republic; Haiti; Panama; Venezuela	
United States	Washington, D.C.	Embassy	Countries: Bahamas; Belize; Canada; Costa Rica; El Salvador; Guatemala; Honduras; Mexico; Nicaragua	

== Asia ==
Host country	Host city	Mission	Concurrent accreditation	Ref.
China	Beijing	Embassy	Countries: Cambodia; Mongolia; North Korea; Vietnam	
Japan	Tokyo	Embassy	Countries: Palau; South Korea	
India	New Delhi	High Commission	Countries: Afghanistan; Bangladesh; Myanmar; Maldives; Nepal; Sri Lanka; Consular jurisdiction only: Bhutan (Note: Bhutan is listed only under the consular jurisdiction of the Namibian High Commission in New Delhi.)	
Malaysia	Kuala Lumpur	High Commission	Countries: Australia; Brunei; Fiji; Indonesia; New Zealand; Papua New Guinea; Philippines; Thailand; Timor-Leste	

== Europe ==
Host country	Host city	Mission	Concurrent accreditation	Ref.
Austria	Vienna	Embassy	Countries: Albania; Bosnia and Herzegovina; Bulgaria; Croatia; Cyprus; Czechia; Hungary; Moldova; Montenegro; North Macedonia; Romania; Serbia; Slovakia; Slovenia; International Organizations: United Nations; International Atomic Energy Agency; UNIDO; UNODC	
Belgium	Brussels	Embassy	Countries: Luxembourg; Netherlands; International Organizations: European Union; Organisation for the Prohibition of Chemical Weapons	
Finland	Helsinki	Embassy	Countries: Estonia; Latvia; Lithuania	
France	Paris	Embassy	Countries: Italy; Portugal; Spain; International Organizations: CPLP; Food and Agriculture Organization; International Fund for Agricultural Development; OECD; UNESCO; World Food Programme; World Tourism Organization	
Germany	Berlin	Embassy	Countries: Holy See; Poland; Turkey	
Russia	Moscow	Embassy	Countries: Azerbaijan; Belarus; Kazakhstan; Ukraine	
Sweden	Stockholm	Embassy	Countries: Denmark; Iceland; Norway	
United Kingdom	London	High Commission	Countries: Greece; Ireland; Malta; International Organizations: Commonwealth of Nations; International Maritime Organization; Sovereign Entity: Sovereign Military Order of Malta	

== Multilateral organisations ==
Organization	Host city	Host country	Mission	Concurrent accreditation	Ref.
United Nations	New York City	United States	Permanent Mission		
United Nations	Geneva	Switzerland	Permanent Mission	Countries: Switzerland; International Organizations: World Trade Organization	

== Gallery ==
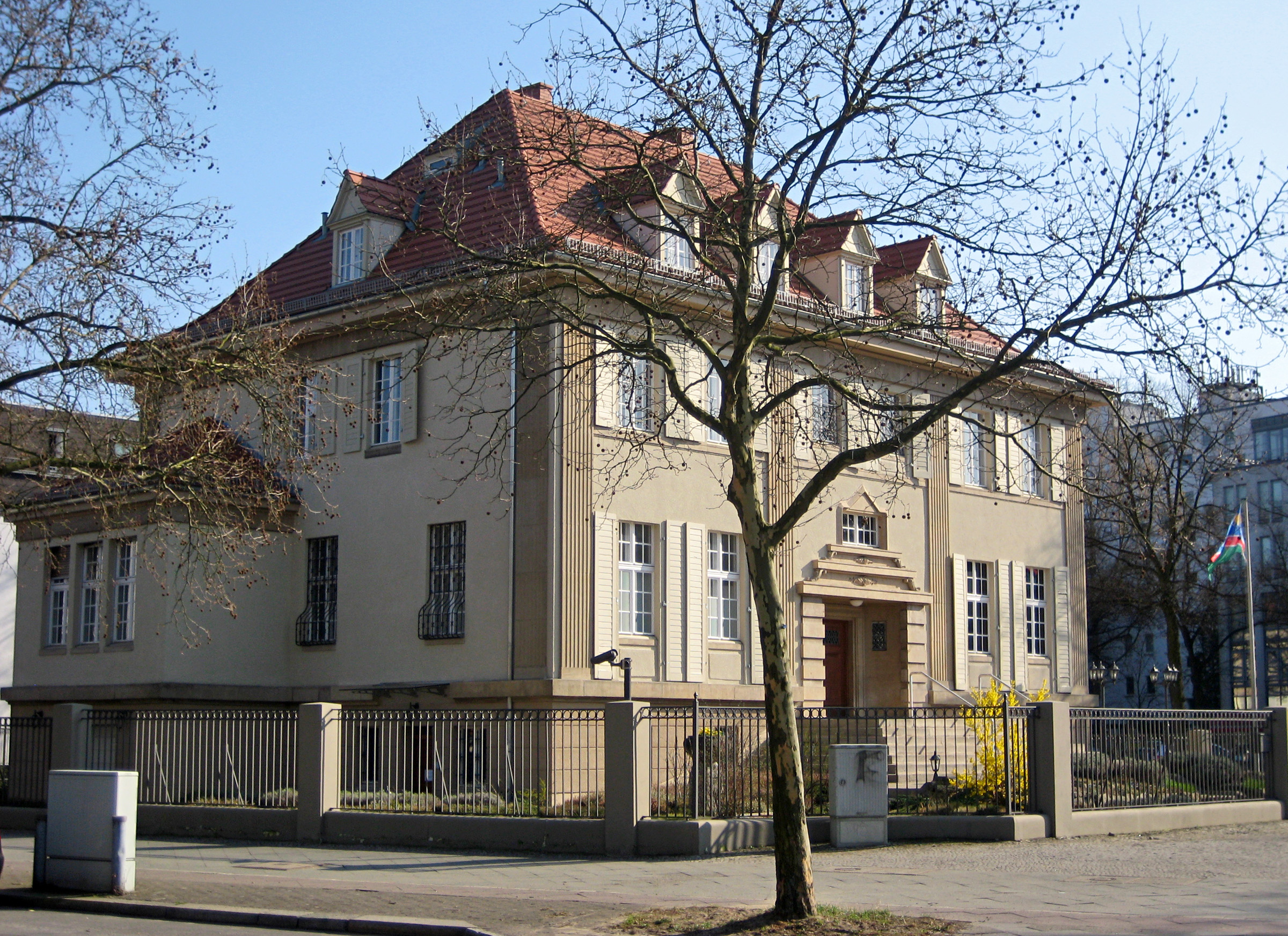
Embassy in Berlin

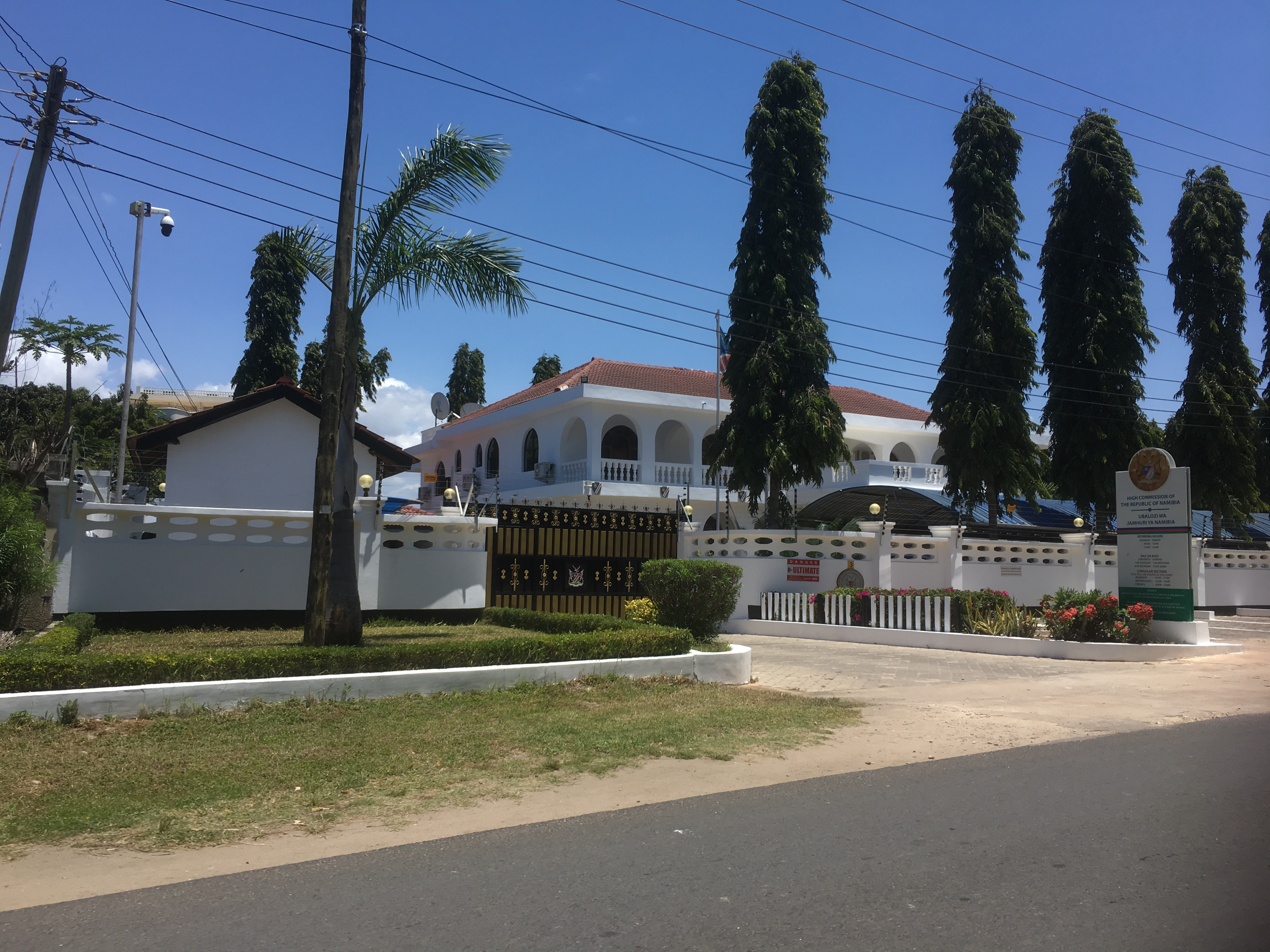
High Commission in Dar es Salaam

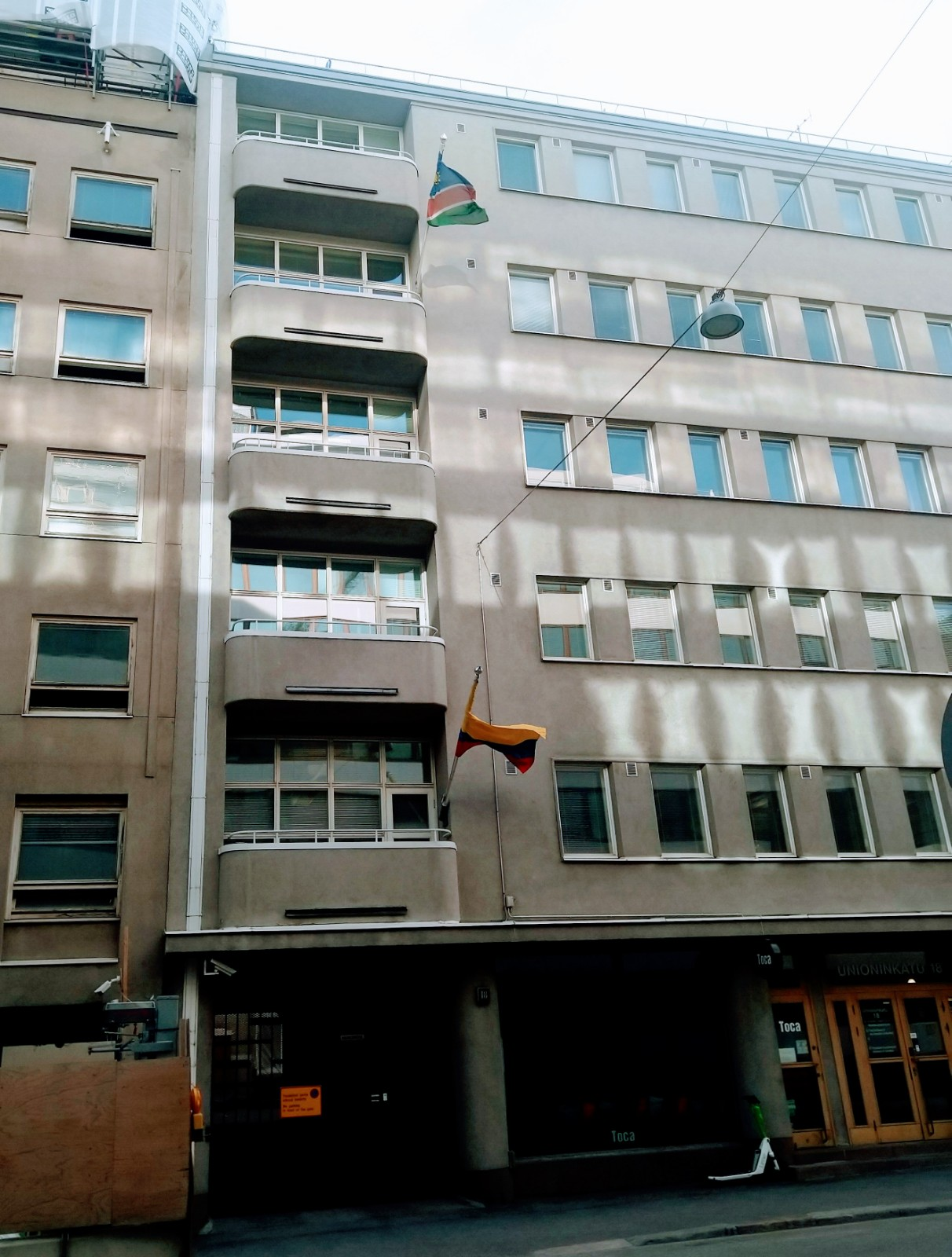
Building hosting the Embassy in Helsinki

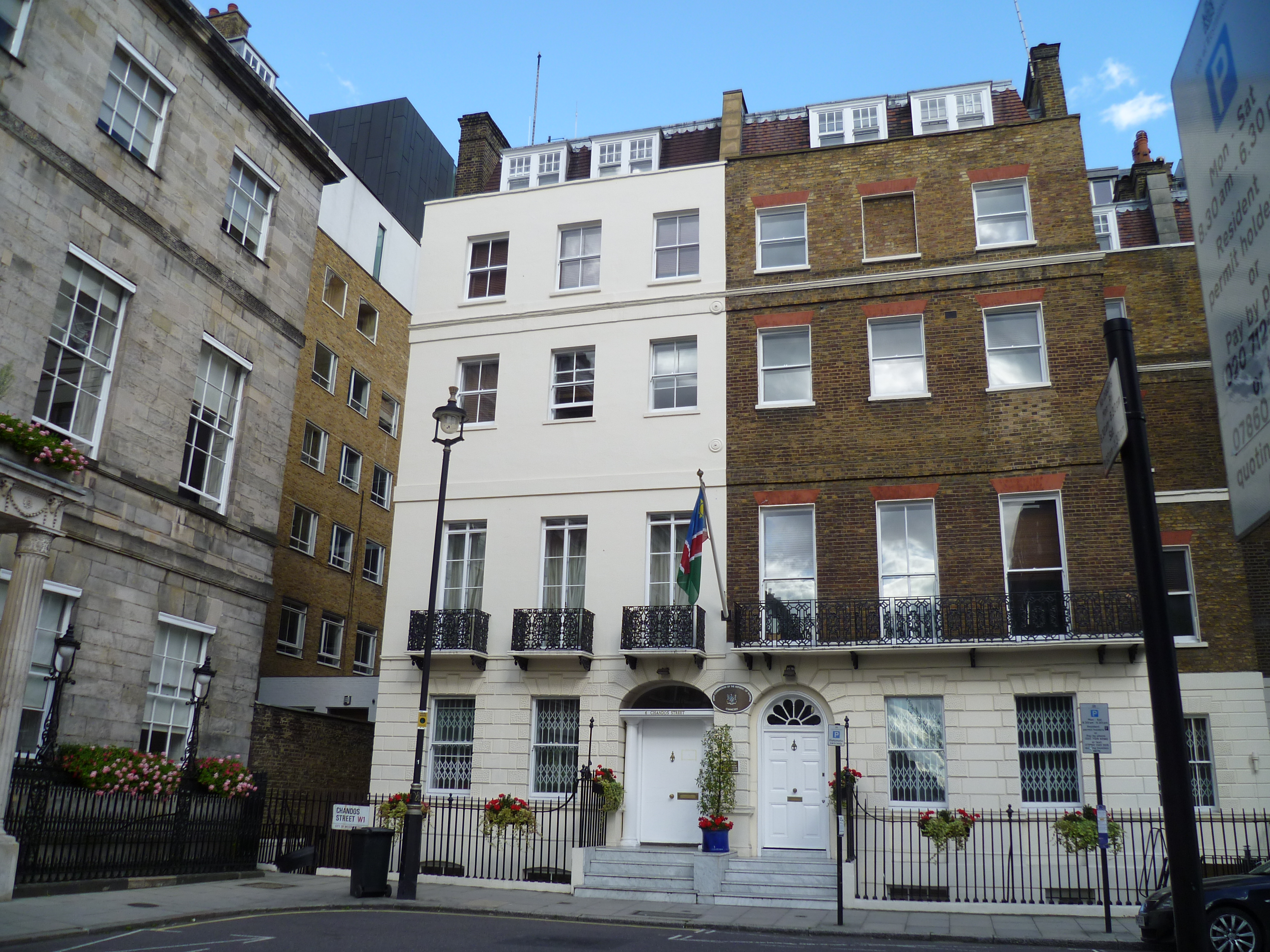
High Commission in London

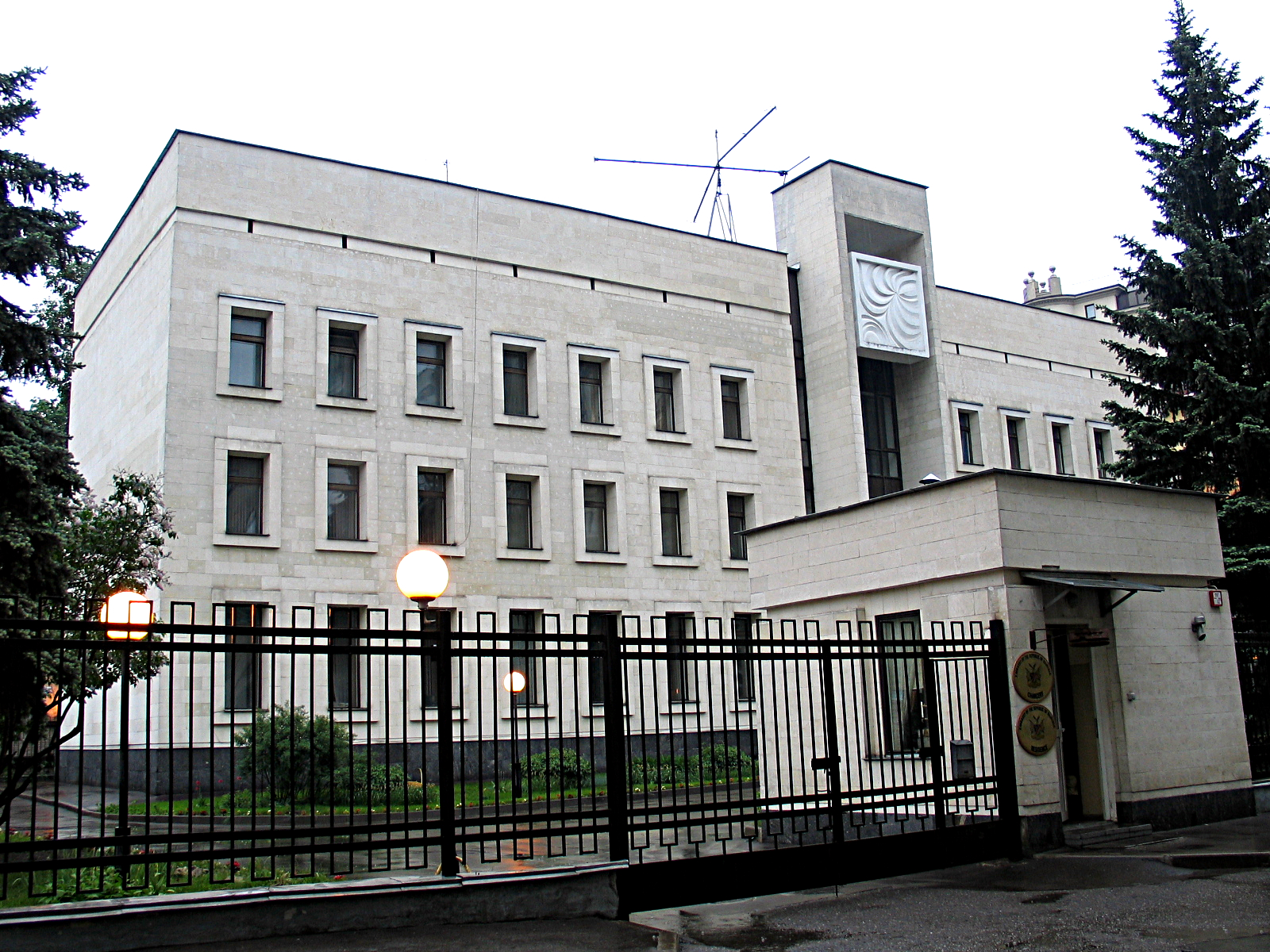
Embassy in Moscow

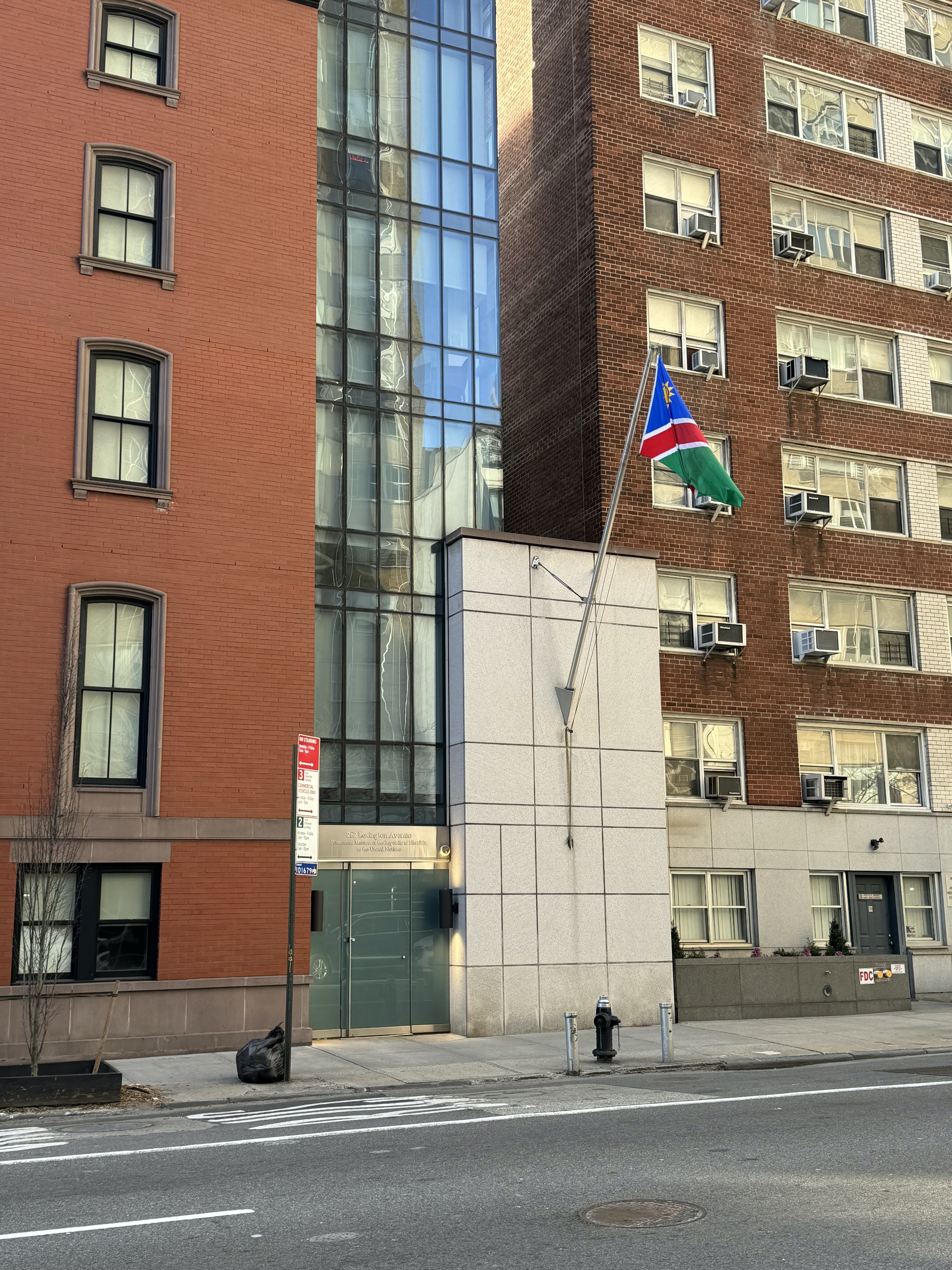
Permanent Mission to the United Nations in New York

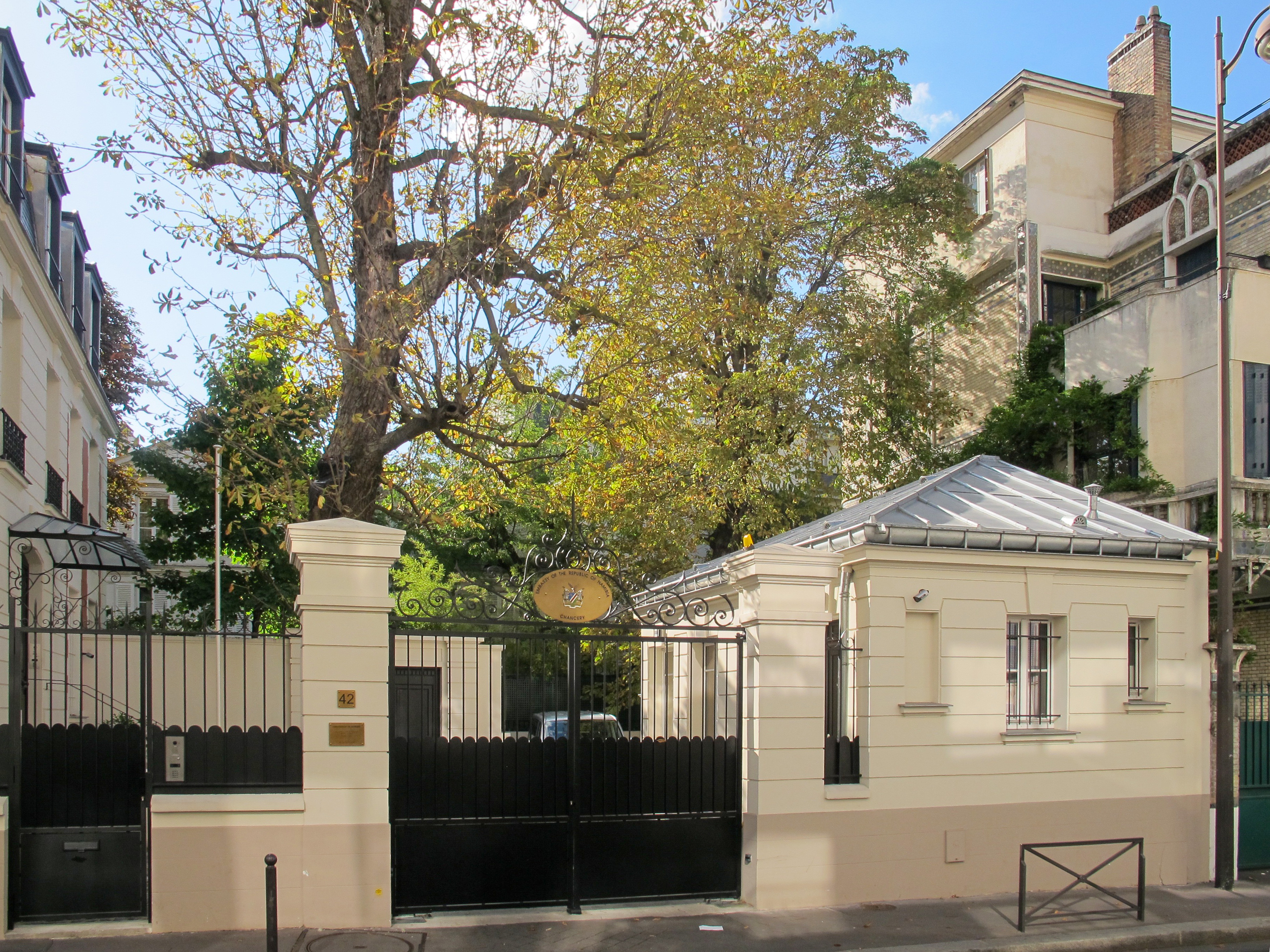
Embassy in Paris

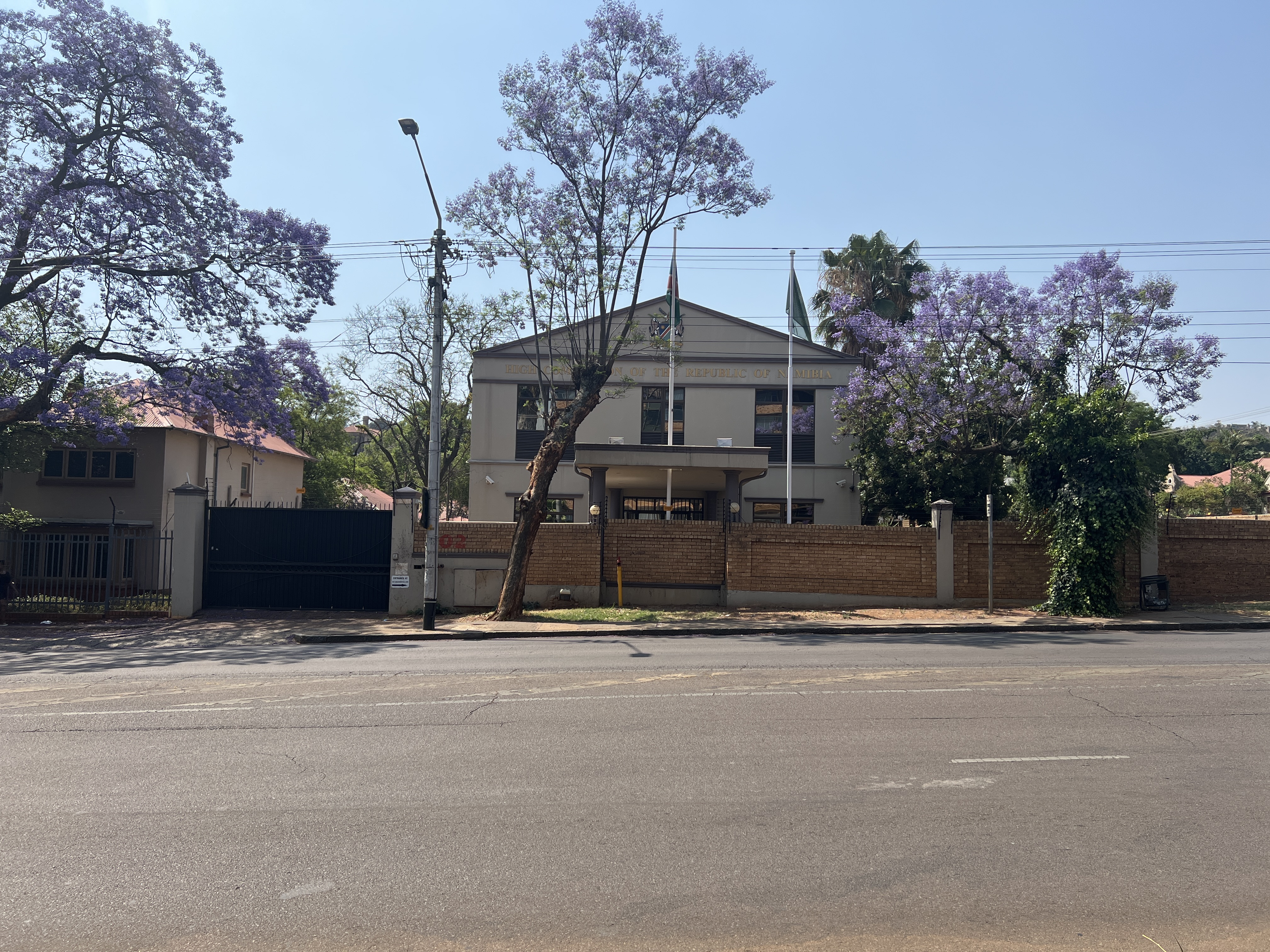
High Commission in Pretoria

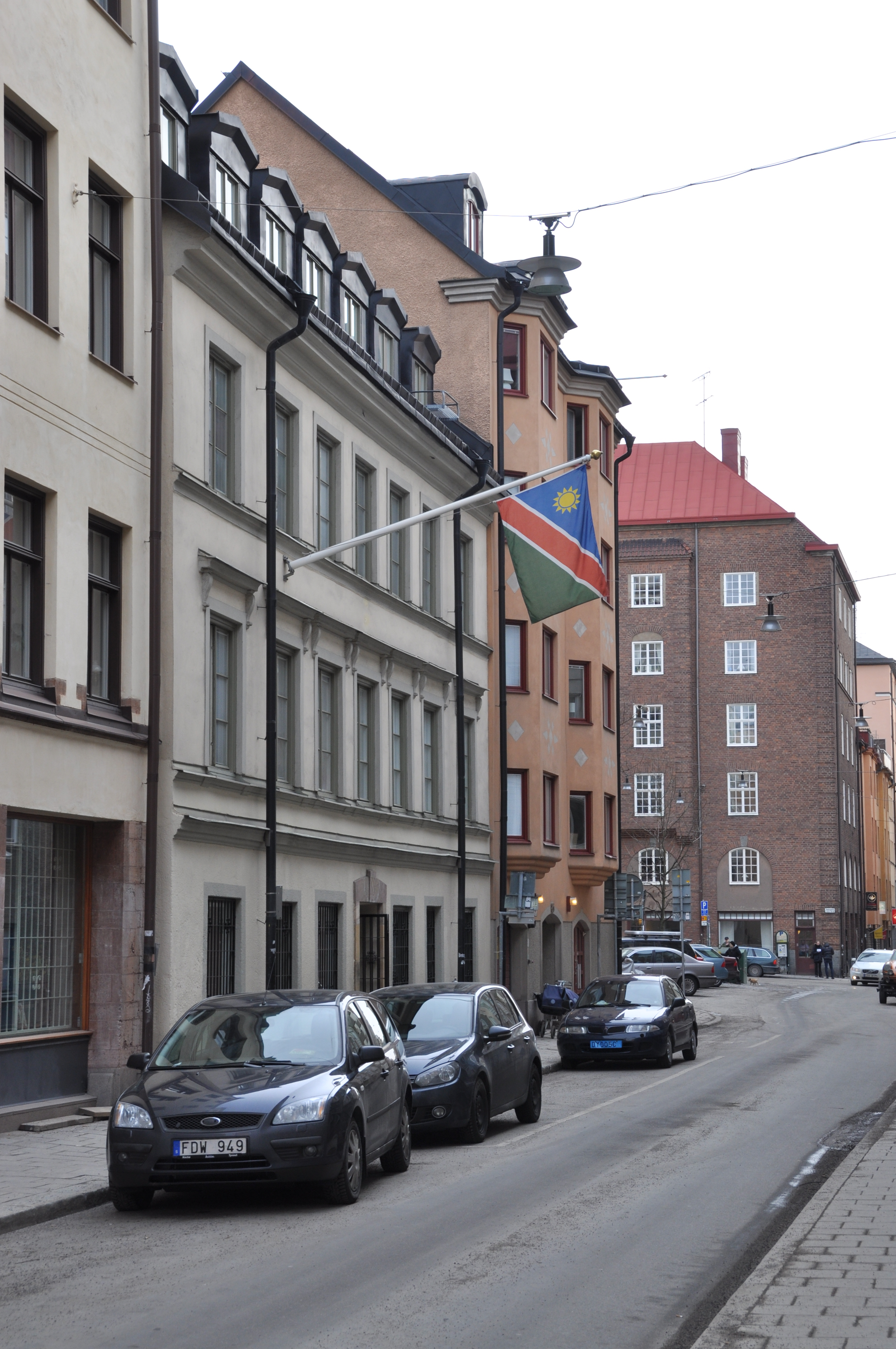
Embassy in Stockholm

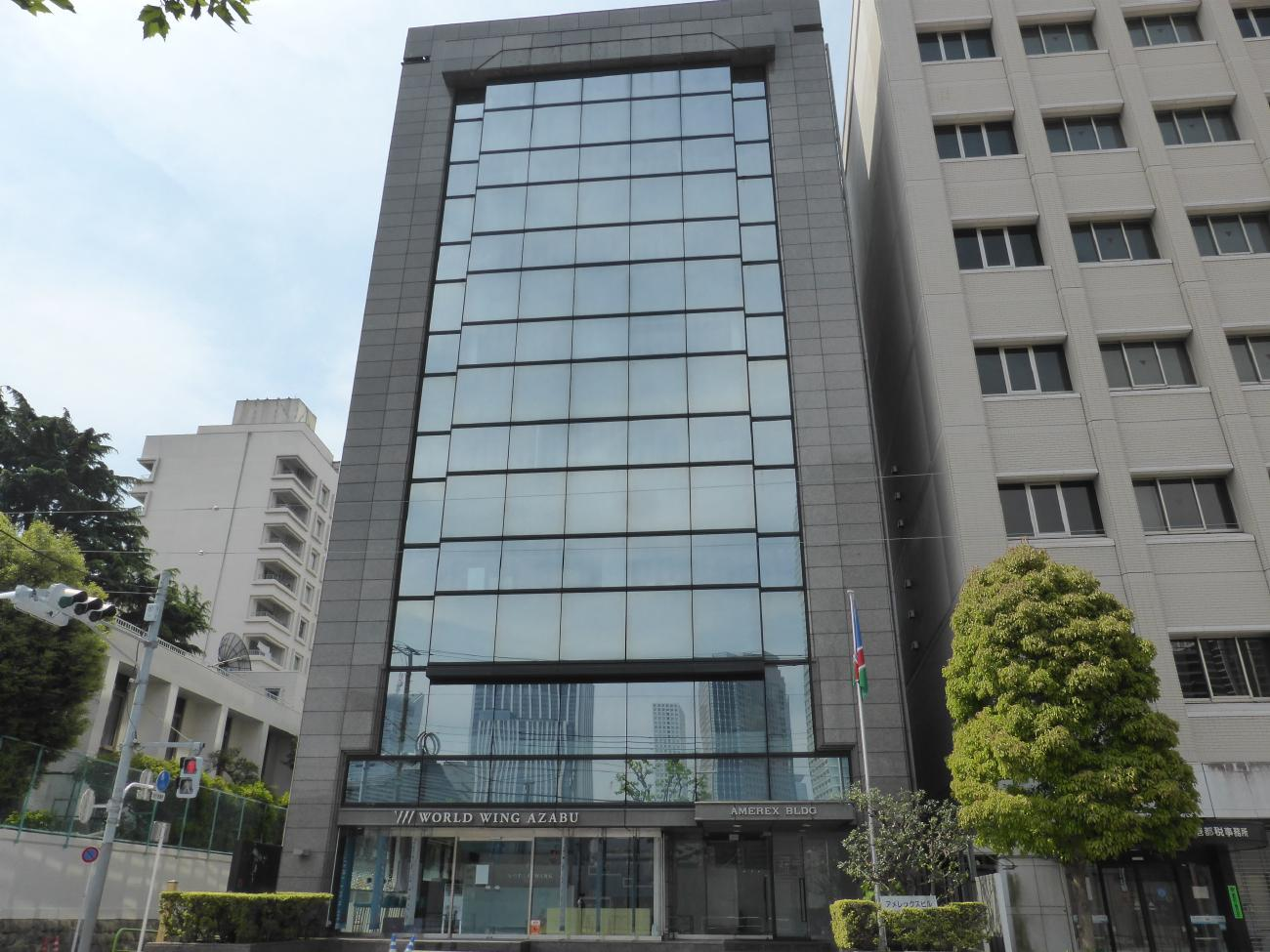
Embassy in Tokyo

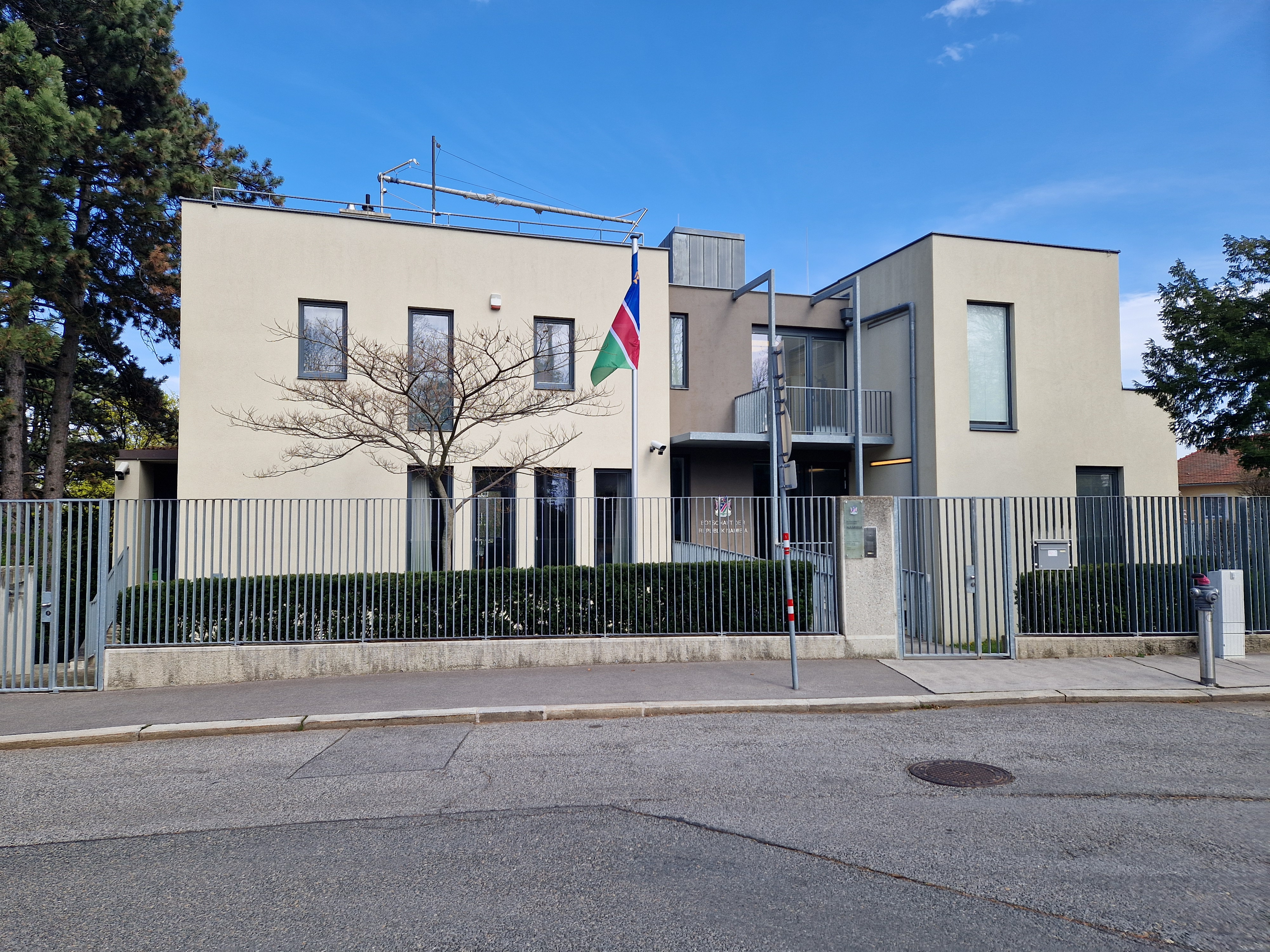
Embassy in Vienna

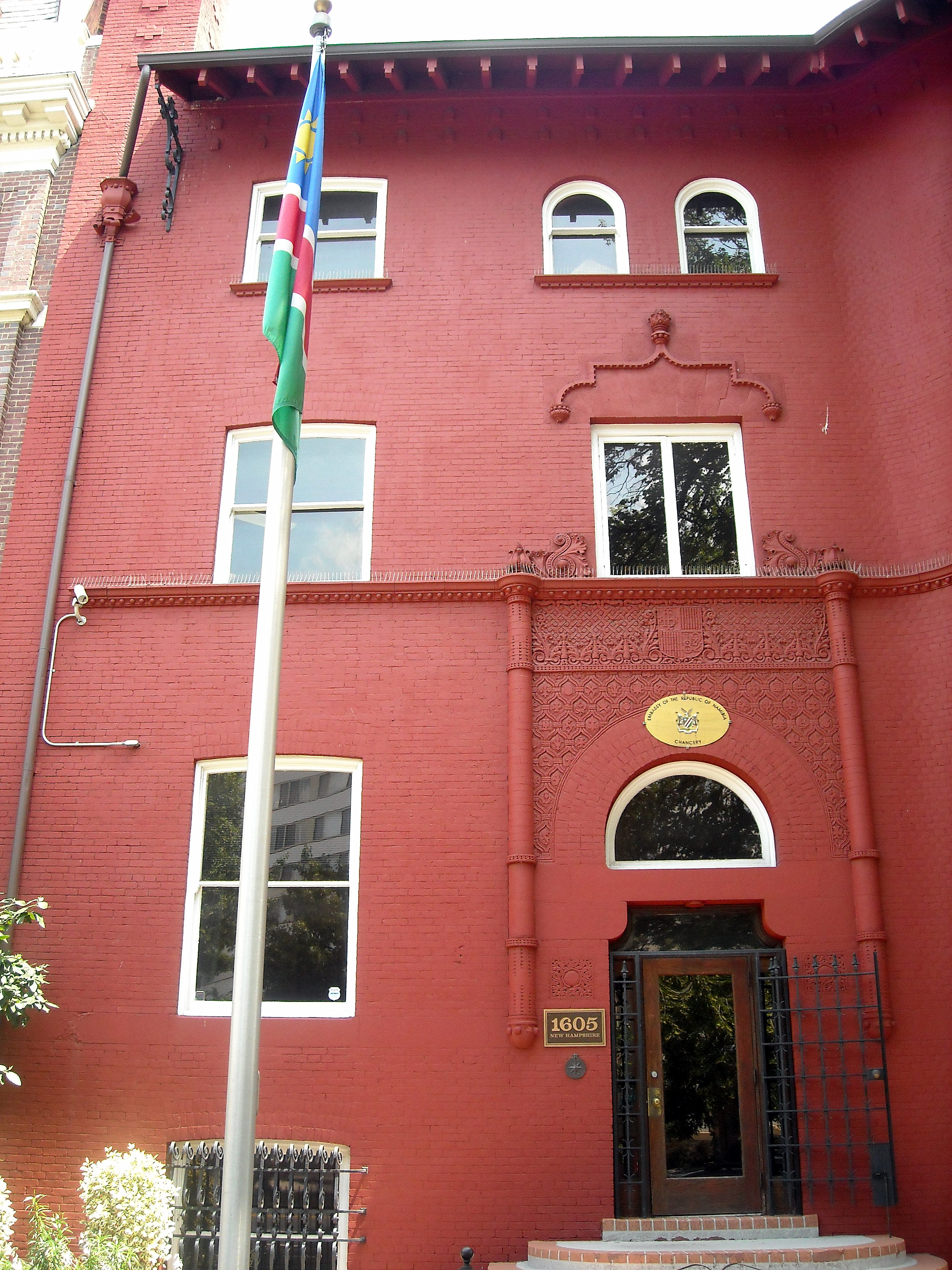
Embassy in Washington, D.C.

== See also ==
- Foreign relations of Namibia
- List of diplomatic missions in Namibia
- Visa policy of Namibia
