= High Commission of Namibia, London =

High Commission of Namibia in London
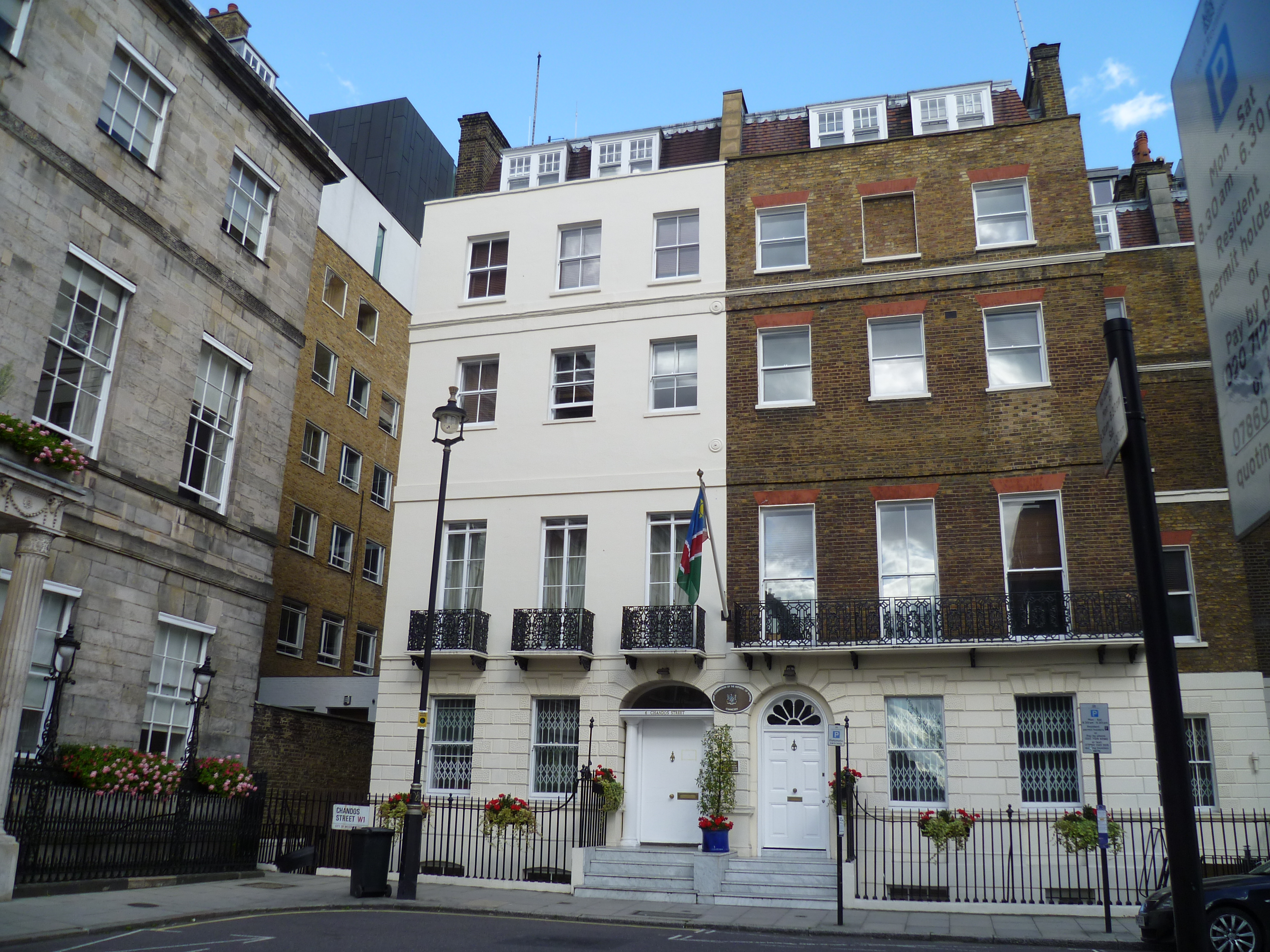
- Location: Marylebone, London
- Address: 6 Chandos Street, London, W1G 9LU
- Coordinates: 51°31′6.1″N 0°8′41.7″W
- High Commissioner: George Mbanga Liswaniso

The High Commission of Namibia in London is the diplomatic mission of Namibia in the United Kingdom.

In 2012 a protest was held outside the High Commission by the conservation group Earthrace against the practice of seal culling in the country.

== Gallery ==
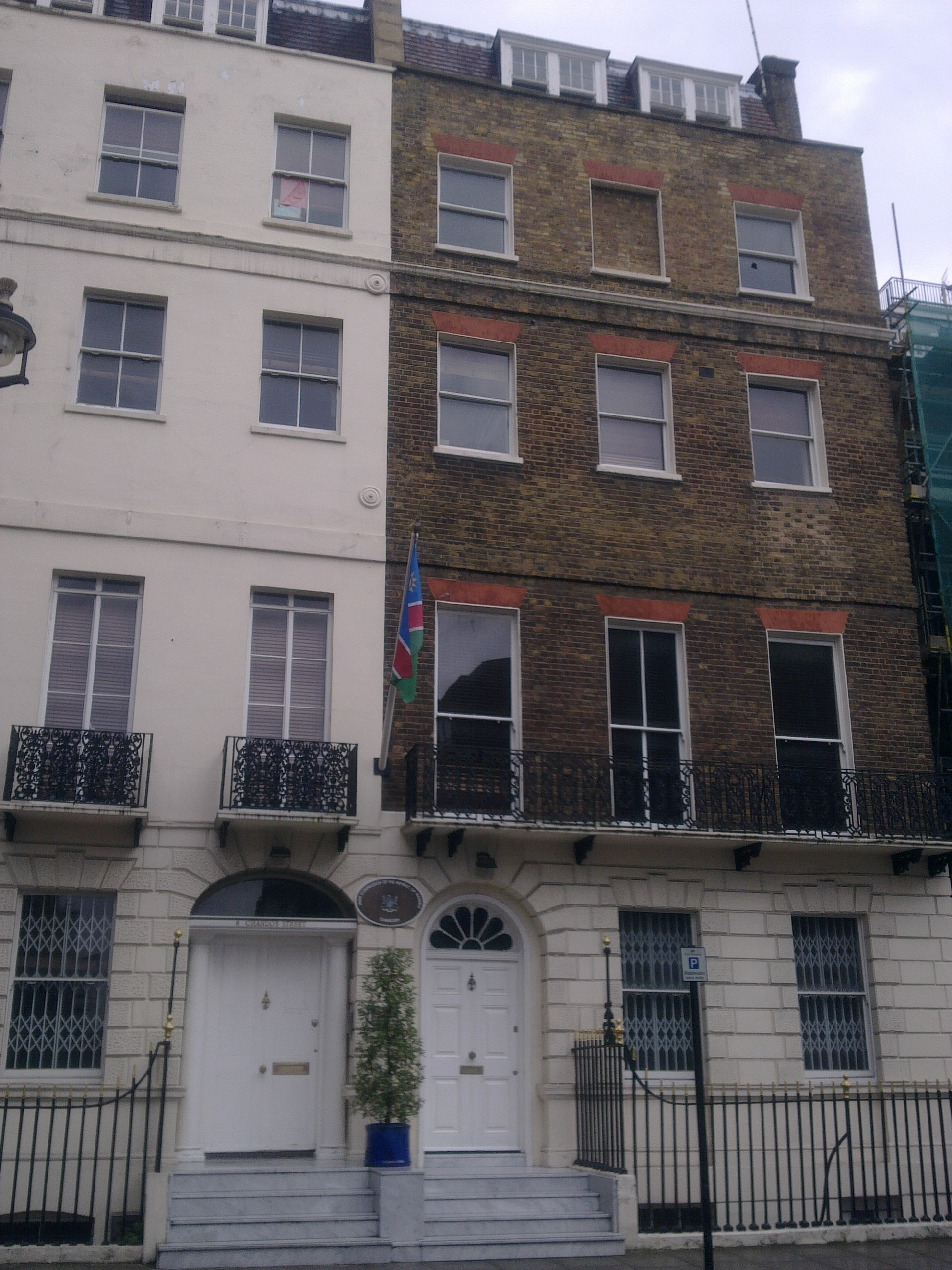
High Commission of Namibia

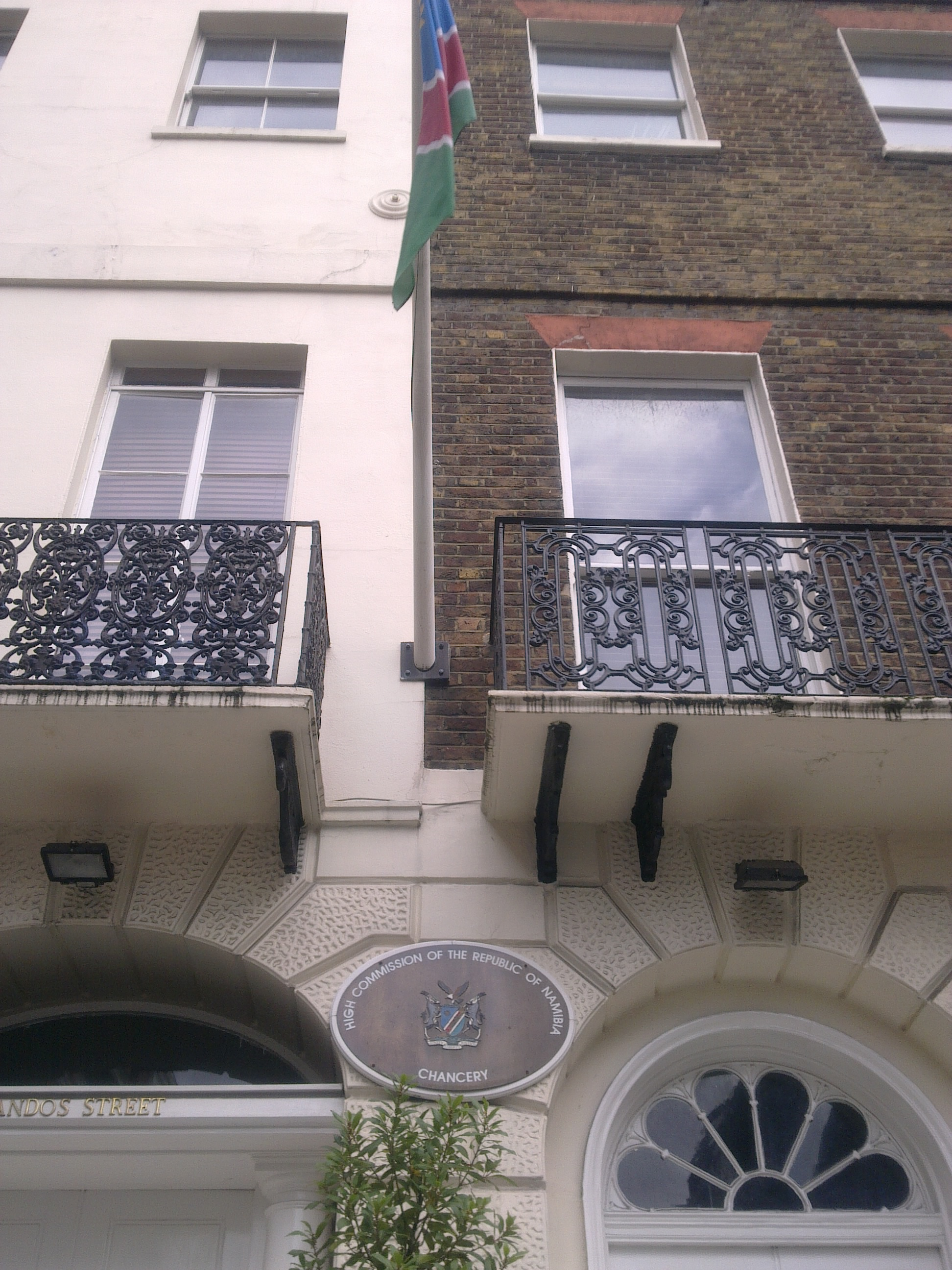
Plaque outside the High Commission depicting the Coat of arms of Namibia
