= List of diplomatic missions in Namibia =

This is a list of diplomatic missions in Namibia. At present, the capital city of Windhoek hosts 34 embassies/high commissions. Meanwhile, the northern towns of Oshakati and Rundu are host to career consulates-general.

Trade missions and honorary consulates are omitted from this listing.

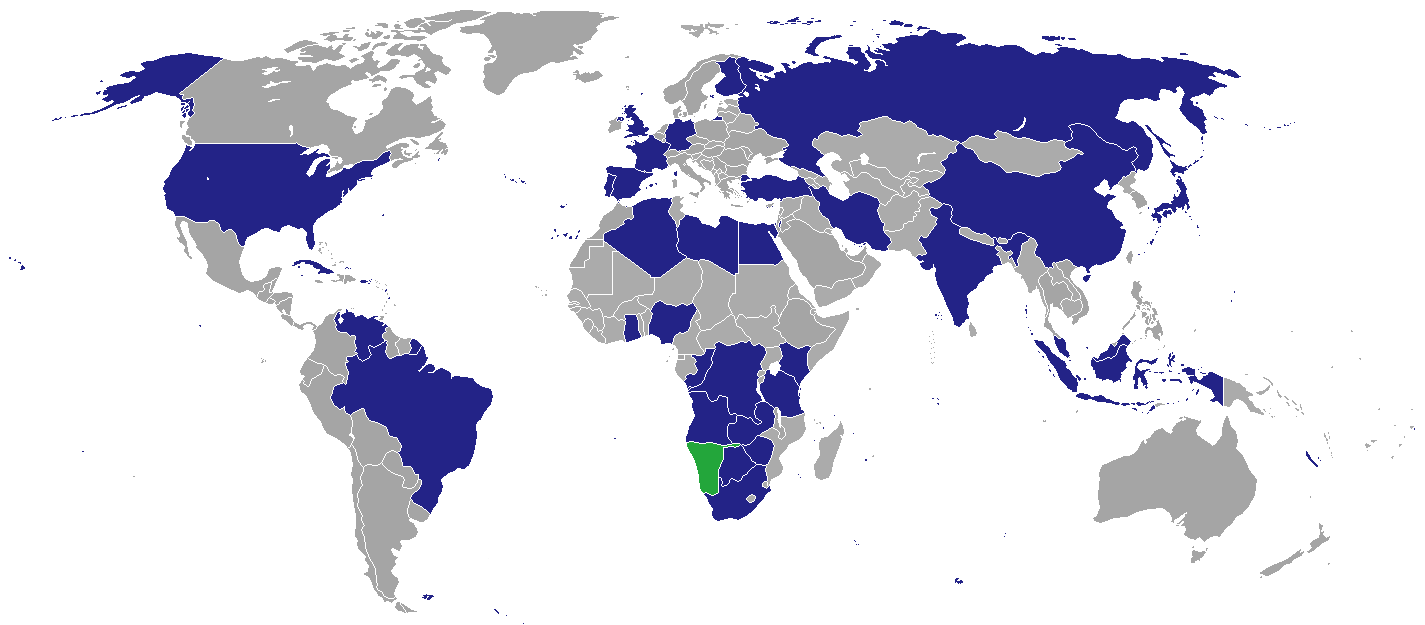
Map of diplomatic missions in Namibia

== Diplomatic missions in Windhoek ==
=== Embassies/High Commissions ===
Entries marked with an asterisk (*) are member-states of the Commonwealth of Nations. As such, their embassies are formally termed as "high commissions".

1. Algeria
2. Angola
3. Botswana*
4. Brazil
5. China
6. Congo-Brazzaville
7. Congo-Kinshasa
8. Cuba
9. Egypt
10. Finland
11. France
12. Germany
13. Ghana*
14. India*
15. Indonesia
16. Iran
17. Japan
18. Kenya*
19. Libya
20. Malaysia*
21. Nigeria*
22. Palestine
23. Portugal
24. Russia
25. South Africa*
26. Sovereign Military Order of Malta
27. Spain
28. Tanzania*
29. Turkey
30. United Kingdom*
31. United States
32. Venezuela
33. Zambia*
34. Zimbabwe

=== Other missions or delegations ===
- European Union (Delegation)

== Consulates-General ==
=== Oshakati, Oshana Region ===
- Angola

=== Rundu, Kavango East Region ===
- Angola

== Gallery ==
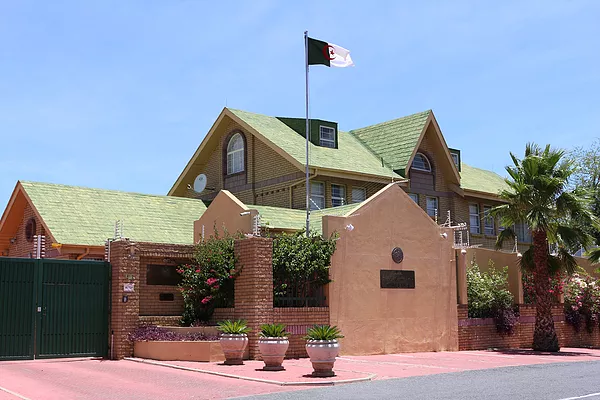
Embassy of Algeria

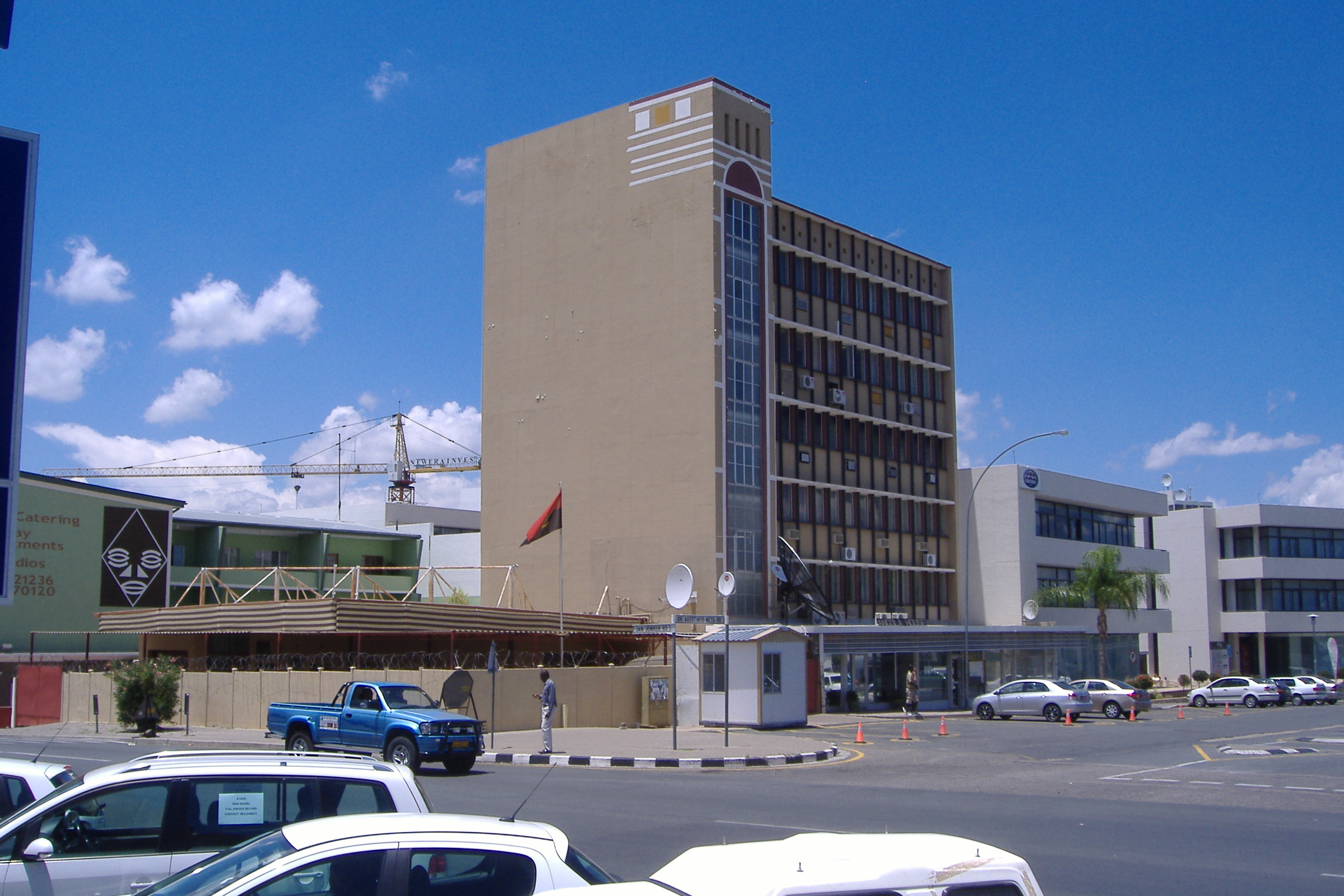
Embassy of Angola

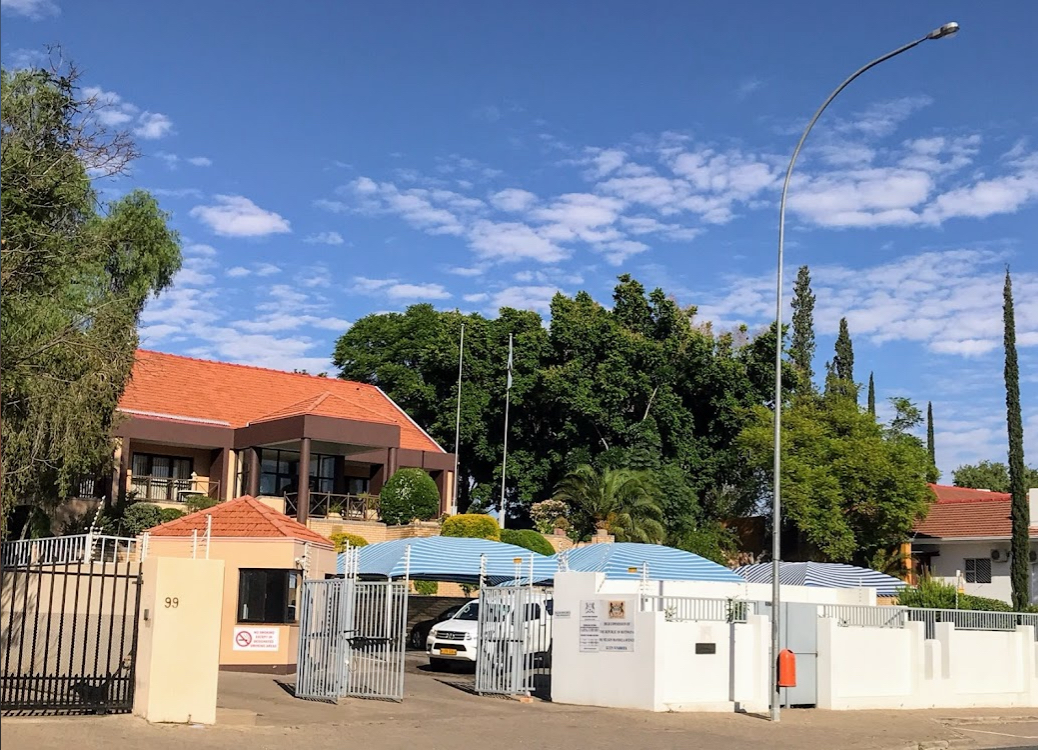
High Commission of Botswana

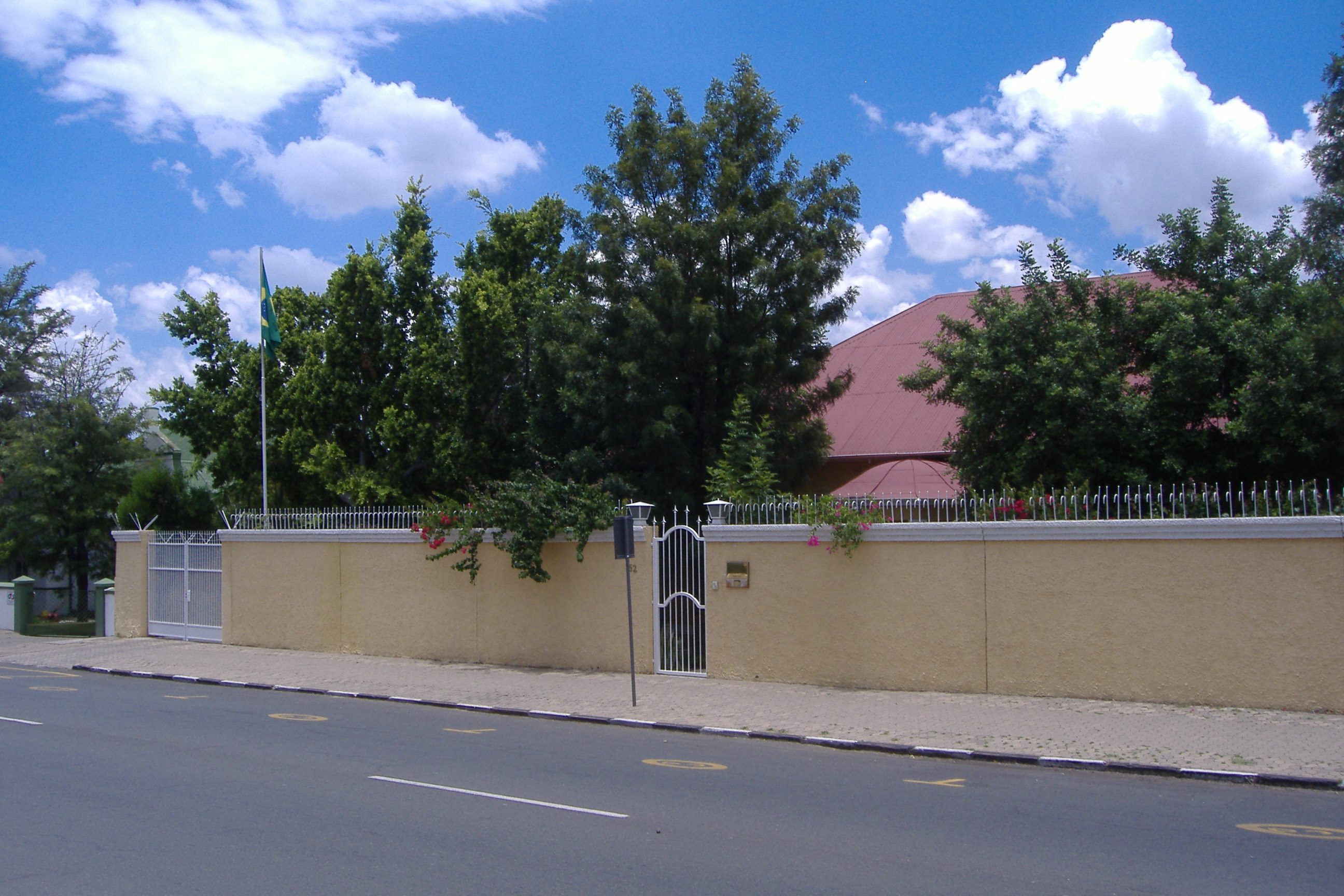
Embassy of Brazil

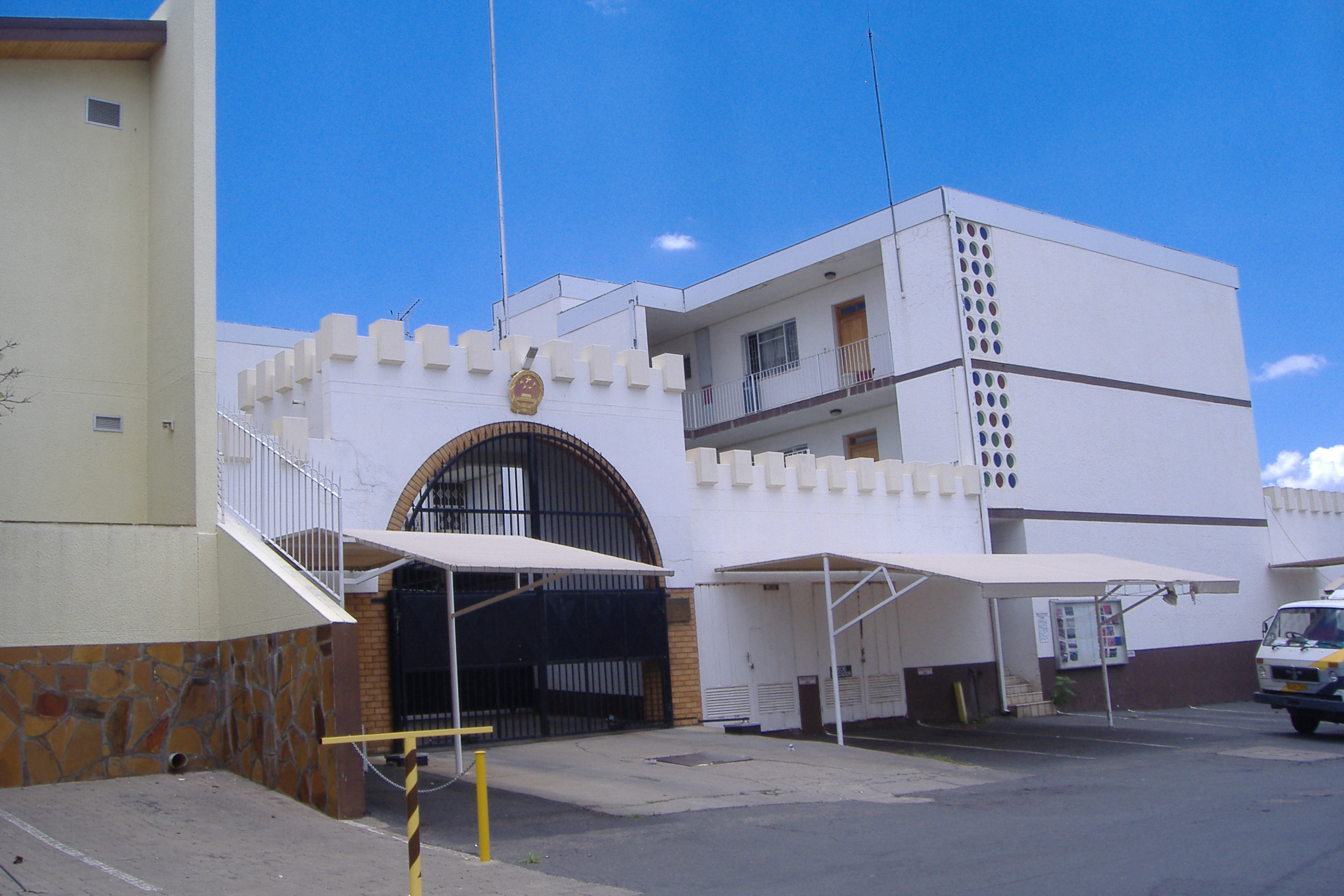
Embassy of China

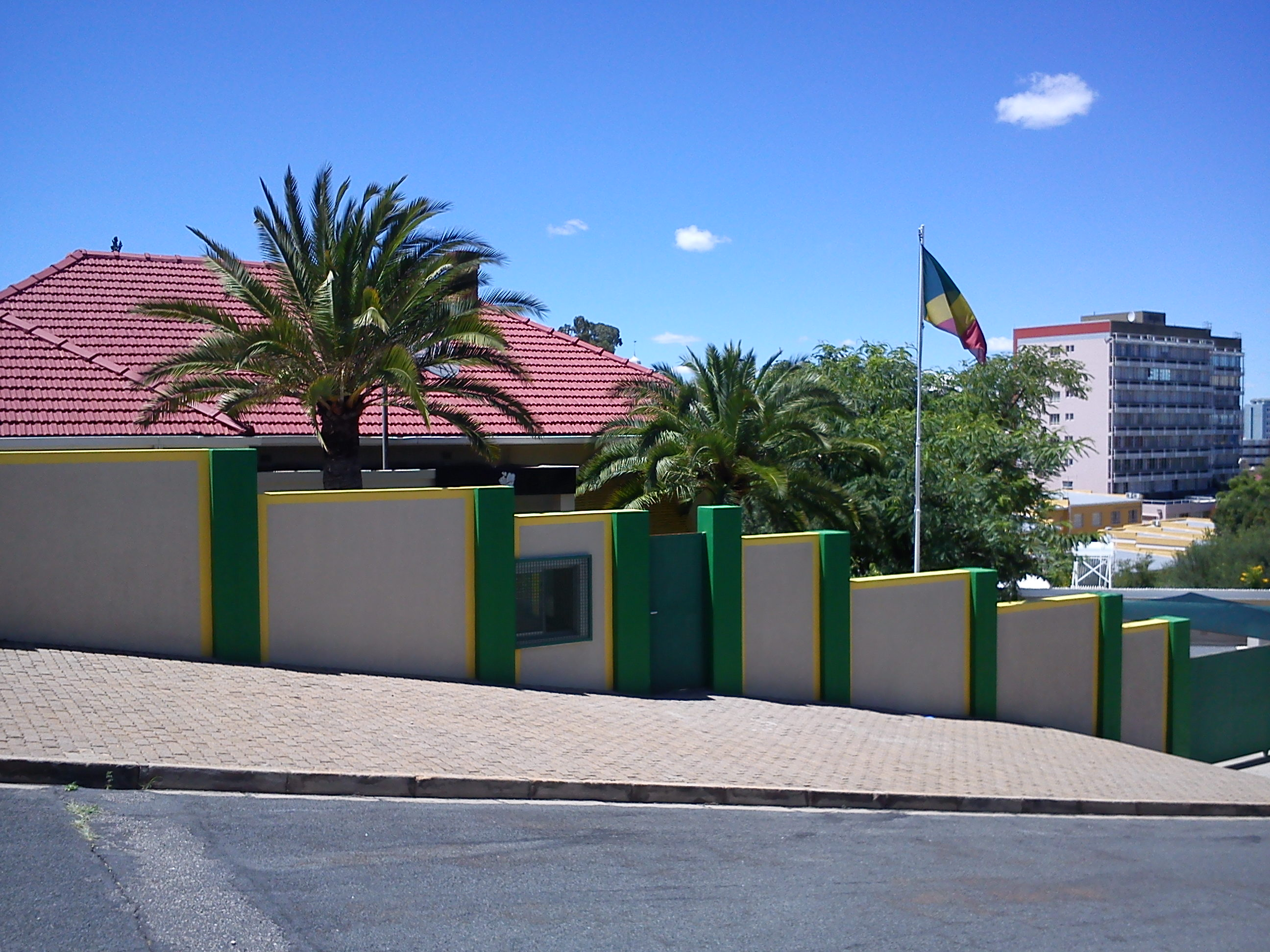
Embassy of Congo-Brazzaville

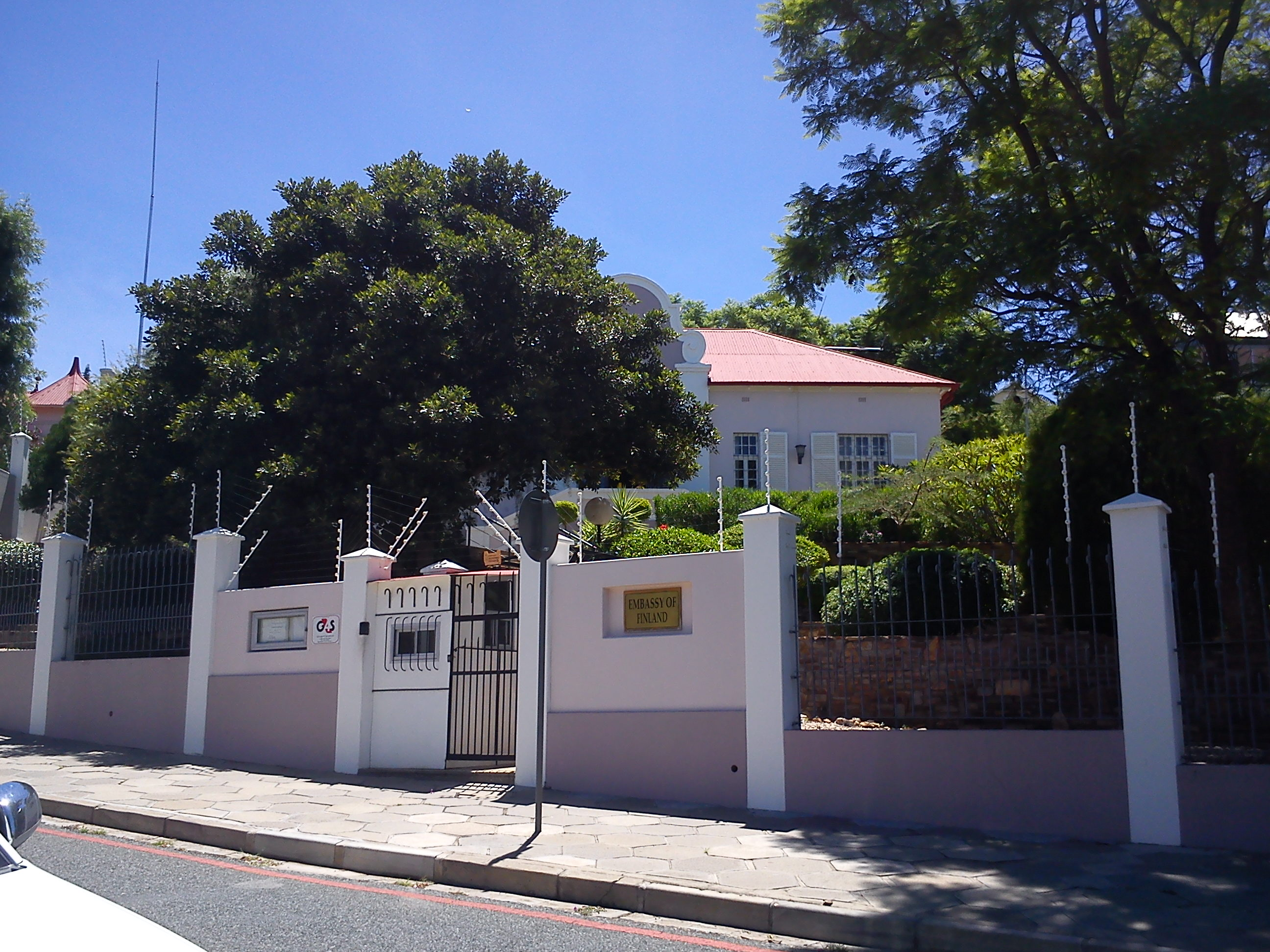
Embassy of Finland

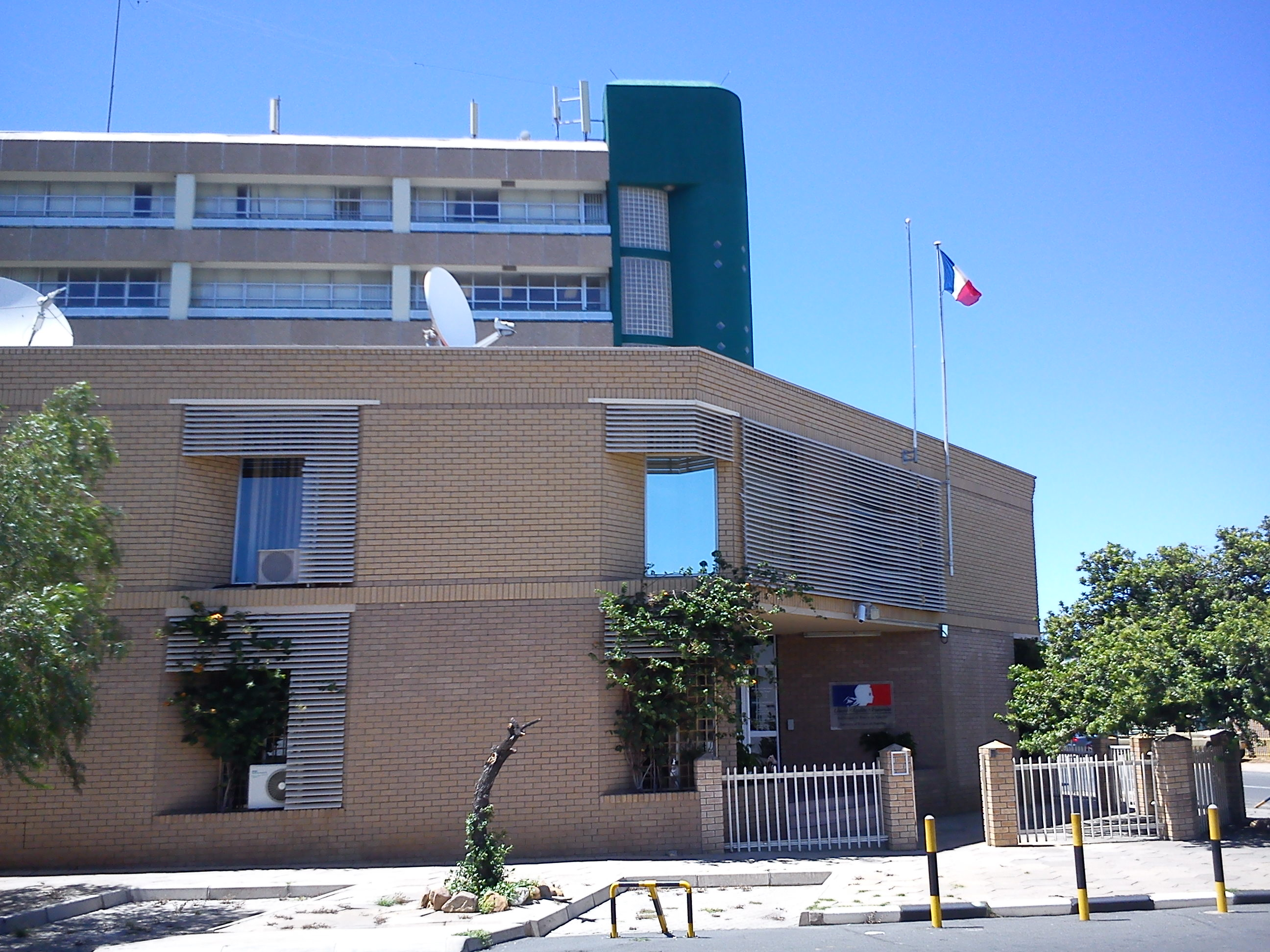
Embassy of France

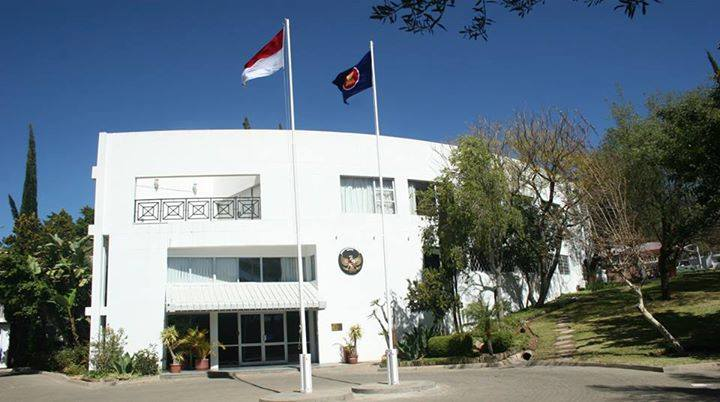
Embassy of Indonesia

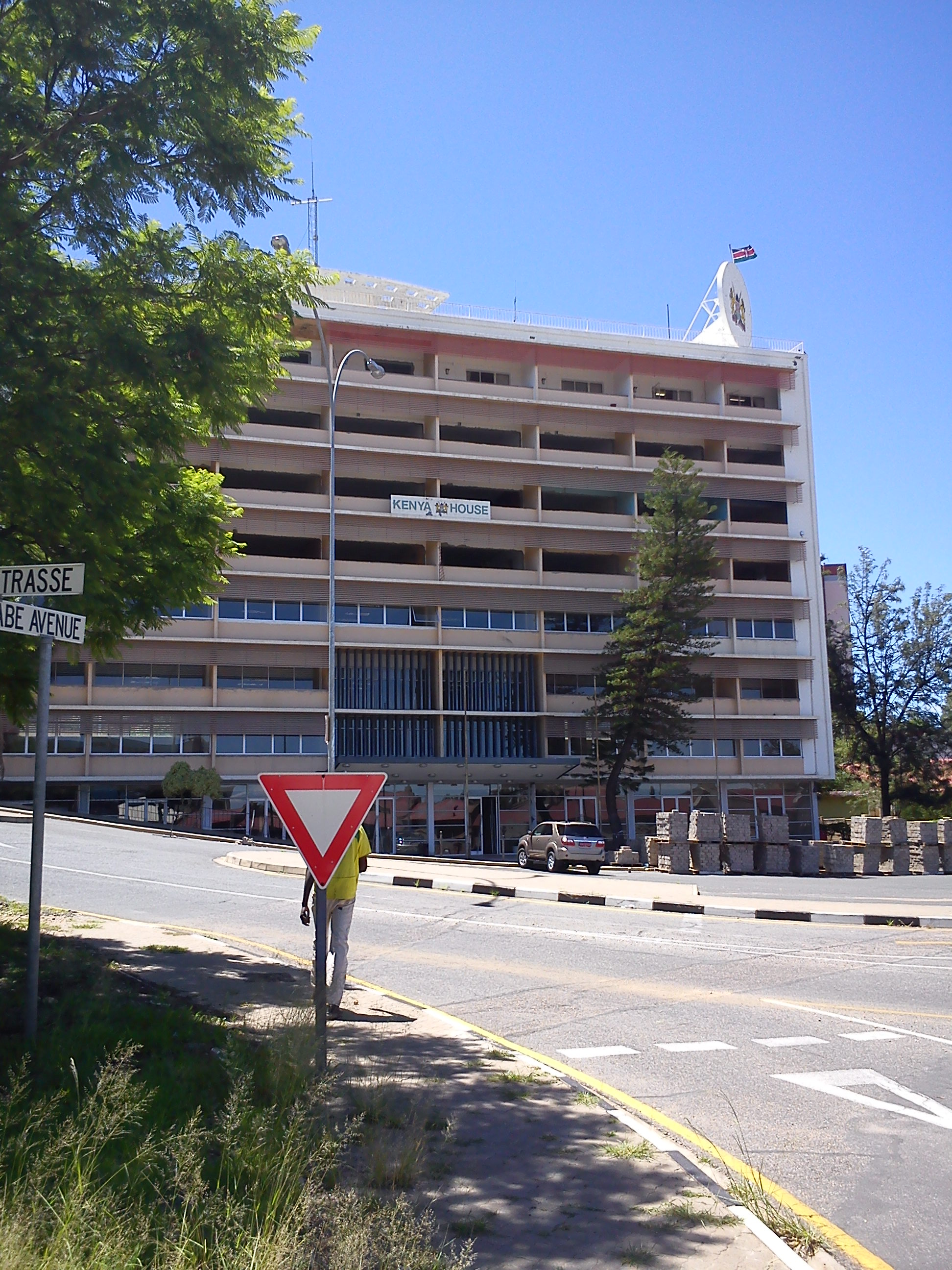
High Commission of Kenya

== Non-resident embassies/high commissions ==
=== Resident in Pretoria, South Africa ===
- Argentina
- Australia
- Austria
- Bangladesh
- Belarus
- Belgium
- Bulgaria
- Burkina Faso
- Burundi
- Cameroon
- Canada
- Central African Republic
- Chad
- Chile
- Colombia
- Croatia
- Cyprus
- Czechia
- Denmark
- Dominican Republic
- Eswatini
- Ethiopia
- Gambia
- Greece
- Holy See
- Hungary
- Israel
- Italy
- Jamaica
- Kazakhstan
- Kuwait
- Lesotho
- Liberia
- Lithuania
- Madagascar
- Malawi
- Mauritania
- Mexico
- Mozambique
- Netherlands
- New Zealand
- North Korea
- Norway
- Panama
- Paraguay
- Philippines
- Poland
- Qatar
- Romania
- Rwanda
- Serbia
- Seychelles
- Singapore
- Slovakia
- Somalia
- South Sudan
- Sri Lanka
- Sudan
- Sweden
- Switzerland
- Thailand
- Trinidad and Tobago
- Tunisia
- Uganda
- Ukraine
- United Arab Emirates
- Uruguay
- Vietnam

=== Resident in Luanda, Angola ===
- Equatorial Guinea
- Guinea
- Mali
- Morocco
- Sahrawi Republic
- South Korea

=== Resident in other cities ===
- Ireland (Lusaka)
- Maldives (New Delhi)
- Malta (Valletta)
- Pakistan (Harare)
- Saudi Arabia (Lusaka)
- Sierra Leone (Nairobi)
- Togo (Kinshasa)
- Tonga (Abu Dhabi)
- Yemen (Addis Ababa)

== Closed missions ==
- Canada (closed in 1993)
- Iceland (closed in 2018)
- Italy (closed in 2008)
- Malawi
- Mexico (closed in 2002)
- Netherlands (closed in 2006)
- North Korea (closed in 1994)
- Norway
- Romania (closed in 1999)
- South Korea (closed in 1995)
- Sweden (closed in 2008)

== See also ==
- Foreign relations of Namibia
- List of diplomatic missions of Namibia
