= Seal hunting in Namibia =

Seal culling in Namibia is a contentious issue, with animal rights groups opposing the practice as brutal, but the government supporting it and claiming the brown fur seal population may damage the fishing industry which is strategic to the Namibian economy. Seal harvesting in Namibia targets 80,000 seal pups and 6,000 adult bulls but few are actually harvested. This seal harvest takes place in three places: Cape Cross, Wolf Bay and Atlas Bay.

== Economic factors ==
Seals feed upon fish, and it is alleged by those supporting the practice of seal culling, that the harvesting of seals is necessary for protecting the fish resources.

According to the Fisheries Ministry seal harvesting has attracted direct foreign investment, such as the Hatem Yavuz Group who specializes in the processing and export of seal skins. International scientists have researched the possibility of implants from seal tissue and the use of seal heart valves for human heart surgery.

From 2005 to 2015, Namibia has exported nearly 400,000 seal skins. Along with Canada and Greenland, Namibia is one of the last places where seals are hunted for commercial purposes. The country has set an annual hunt quota of 80,000 Cape fur seal pups and 6,000 bulls. According to The Namibian, Namibia's Ministry of Fisheries and Marine Resources has approved for this quota to be harvested during July 2023.

== Criticism ==
Namibia is the only country in the Southern hemisphere where seal harvesting is still practiced and has attracted criticism from animal rights groups. The legality of seal harvesting is put to question. Rules and regulations governing seal harvesting are not adhered to and currently the office of the Ombudsman in Namibia is carrying out investigations to that effect.

Critics also note that the profits from seal hunting are small compared to those of other Namibian industries, with seal watching bringing in more than seal harvesting does.

== See also ==
- Namibian Maritime and Fisheries Institute
