= Community-based management =

Community-based management (CBM) is a bottom up approach of organization which can be facilitated by an upper government or NGO structure but it aims for local stakeholder participation in the planning, research, development, management and policy making for a community as a whole. The decentralization of managing tactics enables local people to deal with the unique social, political and ecological problems their community might face and find solutions ideal to their situation. Overwhelming national or local economic, political and social pressures can affect the efficiency of CBM as well as its long term application. CBM varies across spatial and temporal scales to reflect the ever-changing distinctive physical and/or human environment it is acting within. While the specifics of each practice might differ, existing research maintains that community based management, when implemented properly, is incredibly beneficial not only for the health of the environment, but also for the well-being of the stakeholders.

== Cultural change and sustainability ==
Social ideologies and cultural divides between regions and often within regions challenge the implications of CBM. The process of identifying stakeholders and maintaining policies needs to fluctuate culturally to imply the sustainability of CBM. Scrutiny of inequality issues and the level of self-management a community will take on needs to be evaluated for each CBM implementation. Therefore, cultural beliefs can be communicated politically whether the community agrees with CBM or not.

== Natural resources ==
The community-based management concept is often integrated into the conservation and development projects of natural resources. Referred to as community-based natural resources management (CBNRM), these projects aim to develop a partnership between wildlife and communities while generating a revenue to benefit the community as well as its resources management.

== See also ==
- Community-based conservation
- Community based forest management in the Philippines
- Sustainable tourism
