= African Wild Dog Conservancy (Namibia) =

Conservation area in Namibia

- Formation: 2005; 21 years ago
- Type: Conservation organization
- Location: Namibia
- Board Chair: Abuid Kandinda
- Website: https://www.nacso.org.na/conservancies/african-wild-dog

The African Wild Dog Conservancy is a registered community-based conservation area in the Otjozondjupa Region of Namibia, covering 3,824 km^{2} (1,476 sq mi), with an approximate human population of 4,713 people. It was established through a governmental declaration in 2005. As one of many communal wildlife conservancies in Namibia, it forms part of the country's conservation programme.

The geographic area is characterised by thornveld savanna and a sandy, rocky landscape that receives 350–400 mm (14–16 in) of annual rainfall. Notable geographical features include holy monument sites at Ozonguti and Okozonduzu, underground water resources near the surface in parts of the Okonodjatu pans, and the Ngunib omuramba. The area is home to a variety of wildlife, including wild dogs, kudu, warthogs, ostriches, gemsbok, eland, cheetahs, leopards, and vultures. Local enterprises include the harvesting of Devil's Claw.

== History ==
The African Wild Dog Conservancy was established through an official declaration in the Government Gazette of the Republic of Namibia No. 3501 in 2005, following the procedures outlined for the establishment of communal wildlife conservancies in Namibia in the country's Nature Conservation Ordinance.

According to the annual audit carried out in 2023, the African Wild Dog Conservancy had 4,370 inhabitants and 1,200 registered conservancy members. It employs a total of 11 staff, who are tasked with resource monitoring and wildlife protection. An elected committee conducts annual general meetings, approves budgets and work plans, as well as regular conservancy reports.

In 2018, the area received the additional status as Community Forest, as defined in Namibia's Forest Act.

== Geography ==
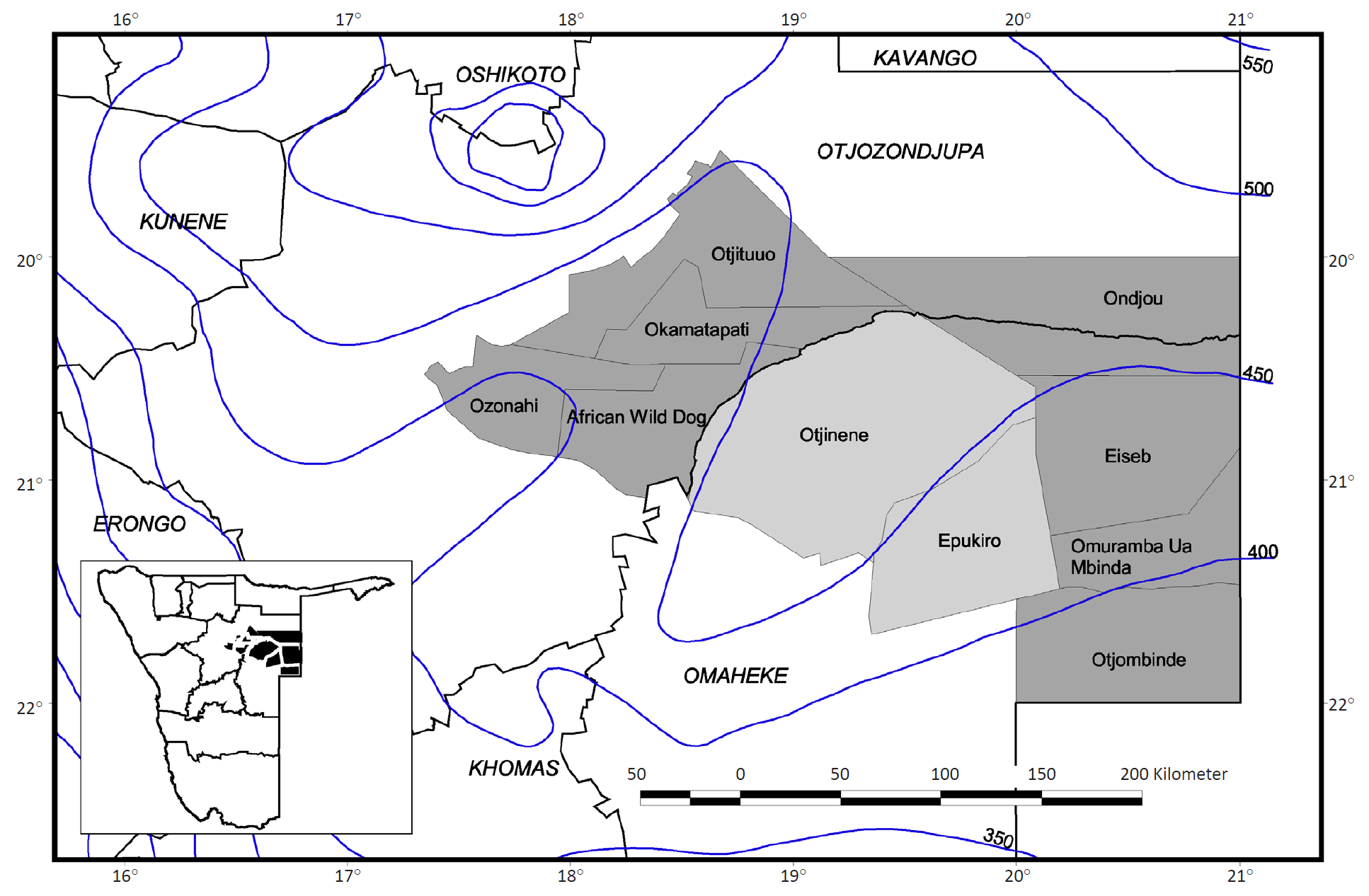
Map of communal conservancies in Eastern Namibia, including African Wild Dog Conservancy

The African Wild Dog Conservancy is located in Otjozondjupa Region, east of the town Okakarara. It covers an area of 3,824 km^{2} (1,476 sq mi). Notable settlements in the conservation area include Okondjatu, Otjamukuru, Otjinyeka, Ehungiro, and Turauhane. The area features transitional vegetation between the xeric southern Kalahari and the northern Kalahari woodlands. This implies generally nutrient poor soils and a susceptibility to desertification. The local savanna grassland is characterised by extensive woody plant encroachment.

Local wildlife includes wild dogs, kudu, warthogs, ostriches, gemsbok, eland, cheetahs, leopards, and vultures.

== Conservation activities ==
Supported by the Community Conservation Fund of Namibia and Cheetah Conservation Fund, measures for the conservation of the African Wild Dog are implemented in the conservancy. The introduction of adapted livestock guarding dogs is an experimental measure aimed at reducing human-wildlife conflicts.

The conservancy was part of trials to enhance biodiversity through the targeted reduction of woody plant encroachment. Woody plants were harvested to restore a more balanced bush to grass ratio, while the resulting woody biomass was used to produce animal fodder.

== See also ==
- Communal wildlife conservancies in Namibia
- Conservation in Namibia
- Community-based conservation
