= Wildlife and Environmental Conservation Society of Zambia =

Non profit organization

Wildlife and Environmental Conservation Society in Zambia
- Formation: 1953
- Headquarters: Zambia
- Website: Website

Wildlife and Environmental Conservation Society of Zambia (WECSZ) is a non profit organization in Zambia established in 1953, which focus mainly on the protection, conservation of wildlife and environmental issue.

WECSZ is a community-based conservation initiatives in important areas which promotes conservation policy, and run Zambia's sole nationwide environmental education programs. Four key areas that serve as the foundation of their work alongside their three main objectives which include wild life conservation, waste management, and water climate resilience.
