= Communal wildlife conservancies in Namibia =

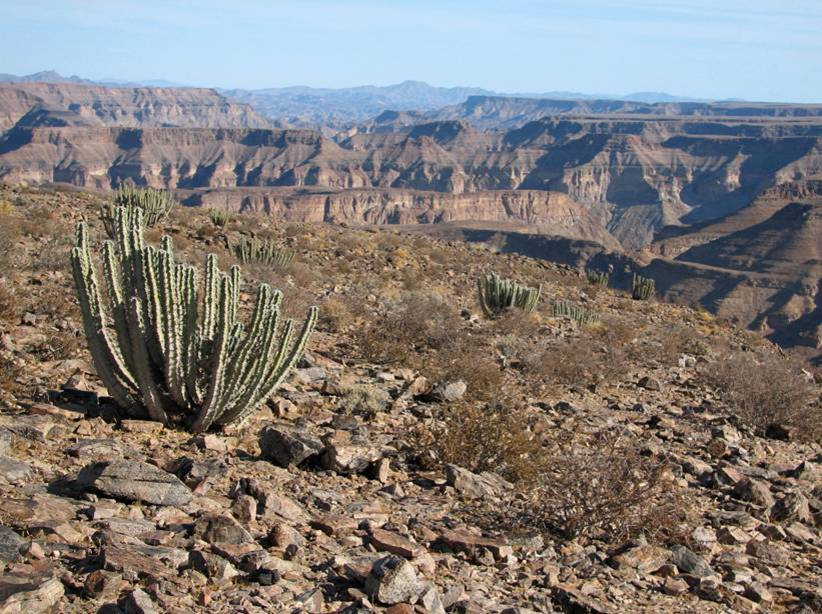
Fish River Canyon, Namibia, 2007.

Namibia is one of few countries in the world to specifically address habitat conservation and protection of natural resources in their constitution. Article 95 states, "The State shall actively promote and maintain the welfare of the people by adopting international policies aimed at the following: maintenance of ecosystems, essential ecological processes, and biological diversity of Namibia, and utilization of living natural resources on a sustainable basis for the benefit of all Namibians, both present and future."

== History and developmentals ==
Aba Huab Conservancy, Namibia, 2007.

Twyfelfontein Conservancy, Namibia, 2007.

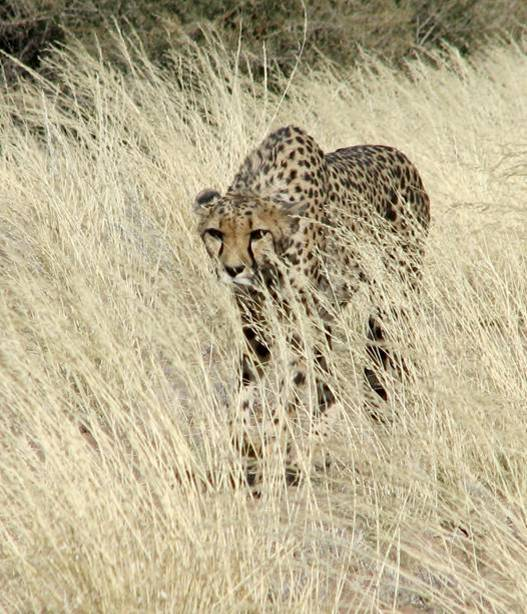
Cheetah, 2007.

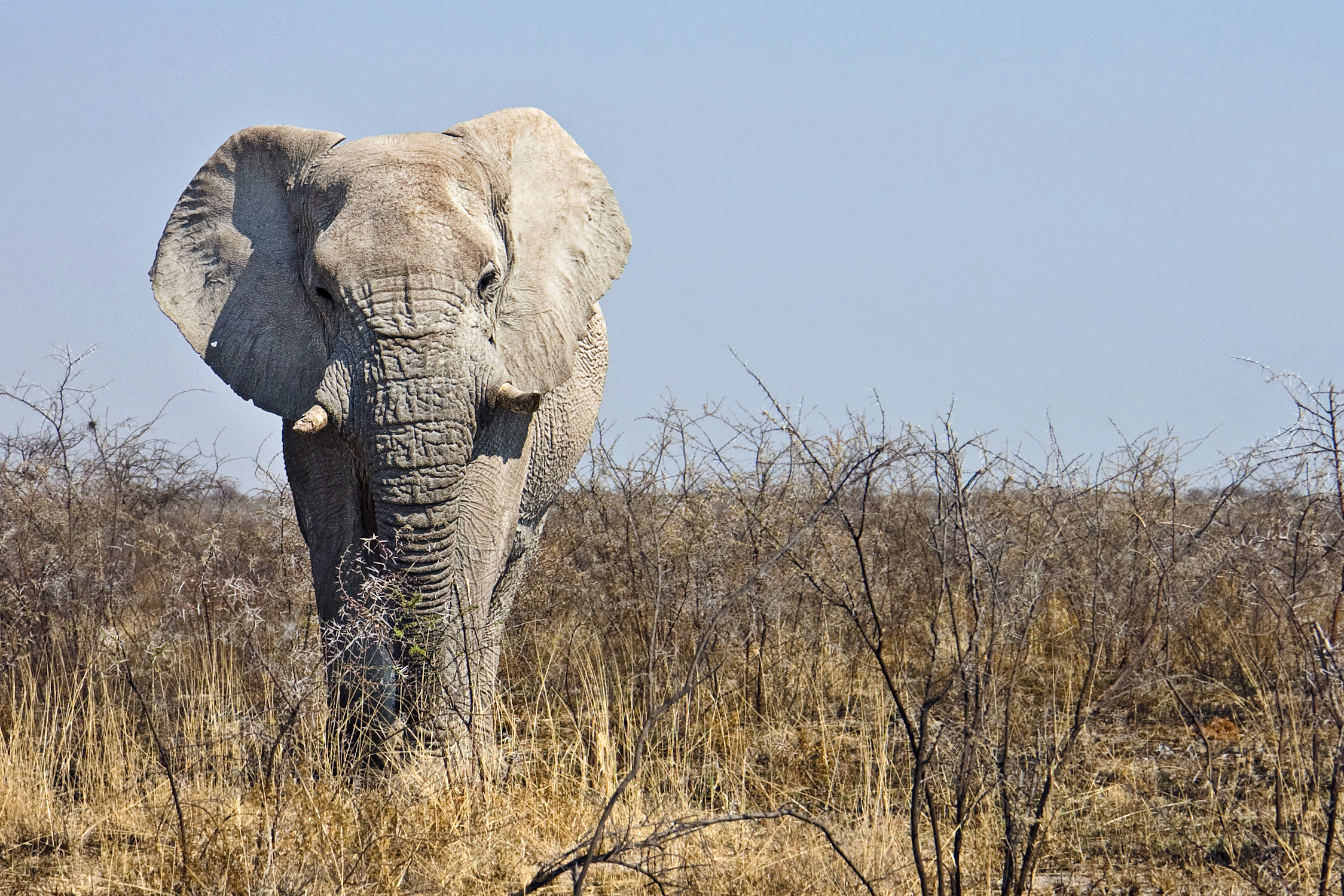
African bush elephant, 2009.

Blue Wildebeest, 2007.

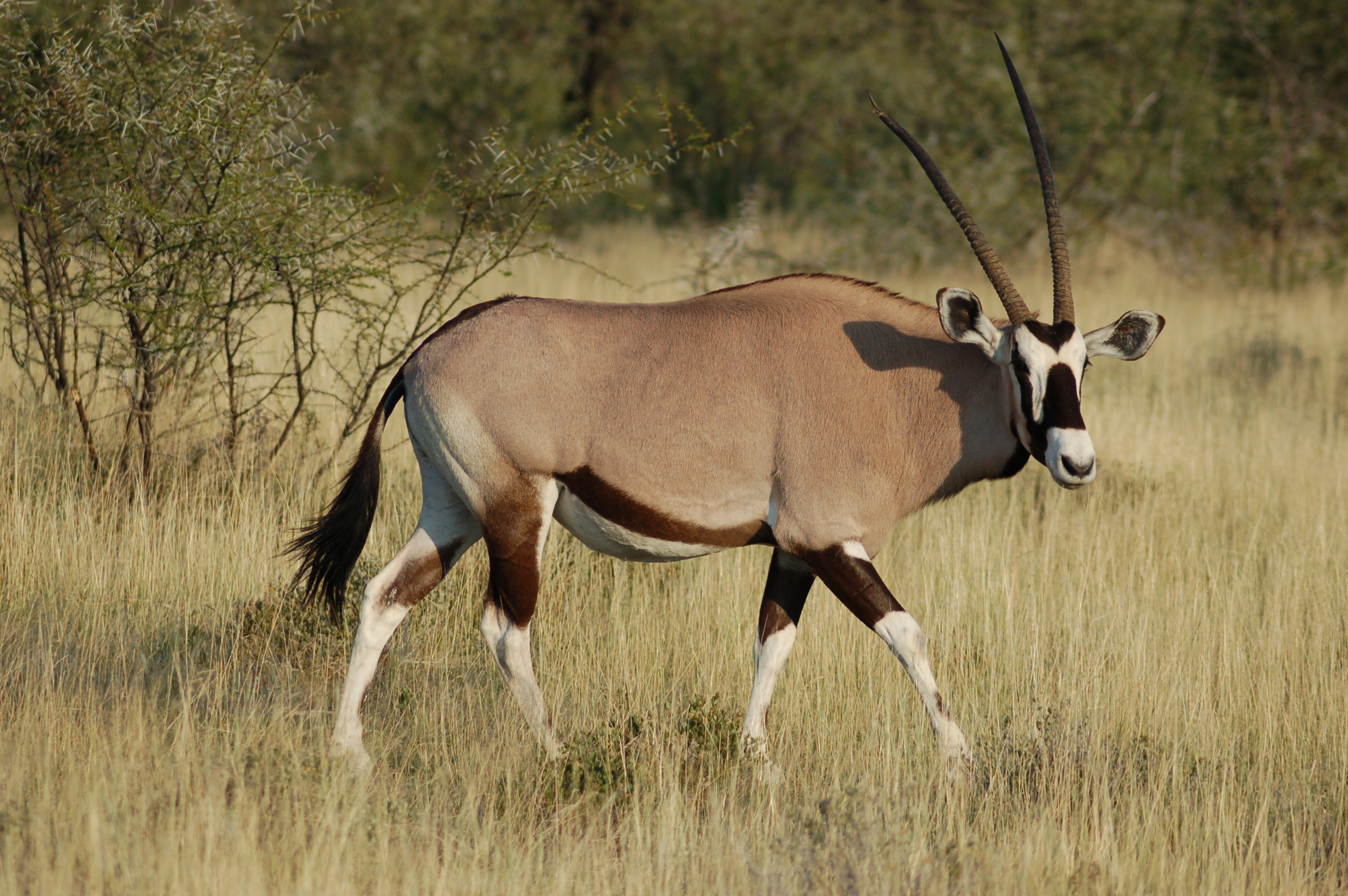
Oryx in Namibia, 2007.

Namibian Zebra, 2007.

In 1993, the newly formed government of Namibia received funding from the United States Agency of International Development (USAID) through its Living in a Finite Environment (LIFE) Project. The Ministry of Environment and Tourism with the financial support of organizations such as USAID, Endangered Wildlife Trust, WWF, and Canadian Ambassador's Fund, together formed a Community Based Natural Resource Management (CBNRM) support structure. The main goal of this project is to promote sustainable natural resource management by giving local communities rights to wildlife management and tourism.

In 1996, the Government of Namibia introduced legislation giving communities the power to create their own conservancies. The legislation allowed local communities to create conservancies that managed and benefited from wildlife on communal land while allowing the local community to work with private companies to create and manage their own tourism market. As of 2006, there are 44 communal conservancies in operation, in which the members are responsible for protecting their own resources sustainably, particularly the wildlife populations for game hunting and ecotourism revenues.

USAID began its third phase of CBNRM program in 2005, which includes expanding community management to include forest, fisheries and grazing land. The third phase also puts an emphasis on community training for business and trade skills.

The conservancies stress the importance of local community control, but do not place any pressure on becoming a member. Communities that wish to apply to become a conservancy must apply through the Minister of Environment and Tourism office. Requirements for the conservancy application include a list of local area people who are community members, a declaration of their goals and objectives, and a map of their geographic boundaries. Their plans must also be discussed with communities that surround their boundaries. Any funds that the community receives through their conservancy must be distributed to the local community.

The conservancies in Namibia consist of various types, including the following:

Traditional villages
These villages attract tourists by displaying their traditional traditions for outsiders. They are conserving Namibia’s cultural heritage while being a source of employment and revenue for the local population.

Community campsites
There are several community owned campsites that provide revenue for the communities that operate them. Staying at campsites is an accessible and affordable way for tourists to lodge in Namibia.

Safari and trophy hunting
Conservancies can develop safari lodges for tourists to visit. Since it takes a great deal of capital to build lodges, conservancies can generate capital by entering in partnerships with private investors. Communities seeking to allow trophy hunting must apply at the same time to be registered as a hunting farm. Conservancies that are home to wildlife can earn income by allowing tourists to pay for hunting privileges or photo tourism.

Sale of crafts
Production and sale of local crafts creates income for local residents, especially women. Crafts are mainly manufactured from natural resources, and these need to be used sustainably if the industry is to continue to grow. NACSO partners provide support in terms of craft development, quality improvement and marketing. Alternative materials for craft making are also explored.

Community forests
In 2001, the government of Namibia approved the Forest Act No. 12. This act allows local communities to obtain forest management rights from the Ministry of the Environment and Tourism. In 2004, 13 communities signed the first community forest agreement with the Minister of the MET. The Community Forest Act focuses on the management of all types of natural vegetation. The term "forest" can include woodlands, grazing areas, farms, settlements, roads and rivers. The term "Forest Resources" refer to natural resources such as trees, fruits, shrubs, herbs, grasses and animals.

Profits from the conservancies are pooled together and used for the benefit of the community. The money can be used for projects such as building schools, daycare facilities or clinics. For example, the Torra Conservancy contributed $2,000 for school renovations, including buying a new photocopier. The profits have also been used for purchasing equipment such as ambulances, while other funds are allocated to individuals as a payment for being a member of the conservancies.

Since the introduction of the conservation legislation in 1996, benefits to the local communities have greatly increased. In 2004, the annual earnings for all 31 conservancies combined equaled $2.35 million, compared to $100,000 in 1995. The first self-sufficient conservancy was the Torra Conservancy, and in 2003, the annual average monetary distribution to their members was about $75. The progress of the CBNRM programs has been such that approximately 1 out of 12 Namibians is a member of a communal wildlife conservancy. An example of a communal conservancy is African Wild Dog Conservancy.

== Protecting wildlife through the conservancies ==
Meerkats in Namibia, 2007.

Moringa Waterhole near Halali, Namibia, 2007.

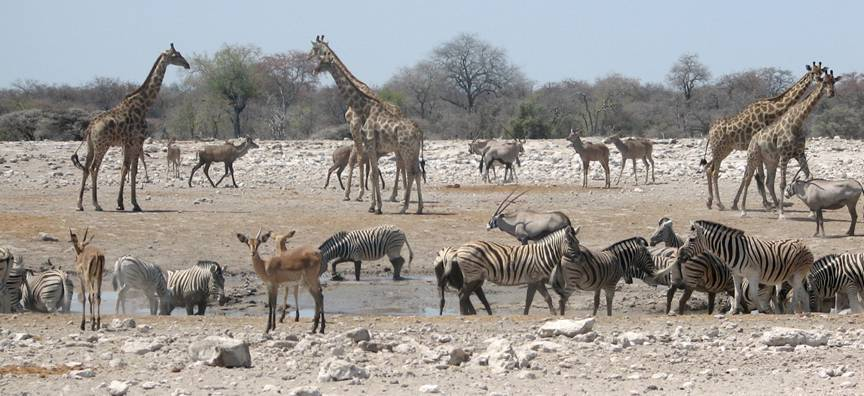
Klein Namutomi Waterhole, Namibia, 2007.

Male Lion in Namibia, 2007.

Cape fur seals on Namibian coast, 2007.

Jackals among seals at Cape Cross, Namibia, 2007.

Namibia has a high level of biodiversity. Approximately 75% of the mammal species richness of Southern Africa exists in Namibia, with 14 endemic species. In fact, the southwest arid zone in Namibia, and much of South Africa, is an endemism hot spot for mammals, birds, and amphibians. Some of this pattern of endemism comes from species being confined by physical barriers, such as the Rocky Escarpment, or being adapted to arid conditions.

There are 3 major biotic zones in Namibia, each being host to many endemic species: the Namib Desert, the Southwest Arid, and the Southern Savanna Woodland. In particular, the Namib Desert is home to the endemic desert elephant and the black rhino.

The aridity of Namibia makes the wetland ecosystems extremely crucial for many species, and can actually drive the distribution patterns of mammals. There's a gradient of species richness in Namibia that extends from southwest to northeast, which is similar to the pattern of rainfall. Because of the aridity, many animal species rely on protected migration corridors during droughty conditions.

Currently, about 50% of all species in Namibia are of some conservation concern. Historically, large game species were vulnerable to hunting and poaching, while other species, such as large mammal predators were vulnerable to habitat conversion to agriculture, leading to local extinction and numerous threatened species. Over the past 200 years, economically valuable game species, such as zebra or lion have experienced a 95% reduction of their former range in Namibia and species, such as elephants and rhinos experienced population reductions to sizes as low as 50 individuals. Although exact numbers are unknown, it is estimated that at least 10 mammal species once known to be in Namibia are no longer there, and are assumed to be locally extinct.

Many of the wildlife populations have also decreased due to human-wildlife conflict, and as a response, these conservancies have attempted to address these concerns. As increasing human populations and habitat conversions to agriculture and/or livestock grazing occur, cheetahs, lions, and other large predators prey on cattle and other livestock. The conservancies mitigate the conflict by compensating the farmers for their losses. Some conservancies pay in cash specifically set aside from the conservancy funds, or, as in the Torra Conservancy, livestock are replaced by ones bred in a breeding station funded by the conservancy profits. This can actually reduce the "revenge killing" of large mammal predators that has been a large cause of the population reductions.

Besides livestock losses, there is also a need to reduce human-elephant conflicts around water resources. There have been several reported elephant attacks, particularly in the northwestern region of Namibia. The Nyae Nyae Conservancy has used the income generated from their park to build and manage water points specifically for elephants away from the human lands. The members of the conservancy are often given cash incentives to keep these water points functioning.

Currently, approximately 14% of Namibia is designated as protected areas, which in 2003, was equivalent to 112,000 km^{2}. Adding the protected communal conservancy lands brings the total to 192, 000 km^{2} of land under some protection. Some exist under an unsystematic figuration design, but 17 of the 29 conservancies (at that time) actually lie adjacent to the government's protected area networks (PANs). This can increase the continuity between protected areas and result in migration routes for elephants and other large range animals.

As a result of these conservancies, there are many instances in which wildlife populations are on the rebound. Poaching has decreased dramatically, and is most likely due to the shift in the perceived value of wildlife. The conservancy members now see that the sustainability of the wildlife is important for providing economic development in game hunting and ecotourism, and often game guards are employed to protect the wildlife from poaching. Animals such as elephants, oryx, buffalo, Hartmann's zebra, springbok and lion, are once again providing biodiversity to the country of Namibia. The black rhino population has recovered to become one of the largest free-roaming herds, and the cheetah population has become the world's largest population at approximately 2,500 individuals. A 2003 game count in northwestern Namibia revealed population recoveries to 500 elephants (up from 50), and 14,000 zebras (up from 500), and 100,000 springbok, and 35,000 oryx.

While there have been many benefits of these conservancies, questions still remain about their success. As of 2004, no quantitative studies had been done to determine if the conservancies have actually helped in protecting biodiversity, (but see the surveys reported above) or in increasing wildlife populations of all threatened species. One concern is that the conservancies might encourage the populations of only high-value game species, and ignore the others. This might not be optimum for biodiversity, although of course far better than if communities were gaining their income primarily through livestock and cropping, as they did before the conservancies were initiated. A way to possibly alleviate this problem might be to focus the profits on non-consumptive uses, such as ecotourism/safari activities, in which the only thing to shoot with is a camera. However, ecotourism likewise could lead to favouring of those species that tourists like to see, and can have major impacts in terms of infrastructure development, pollution, and other pressures of increased numbers of visitations.

There is also some concern that the protected area networks (PANs) established by the Namibian government are heavily skewed towards the Namib Desert biome, and do not fully represent all of Namibia's terrestrial ecosystems. While the biome is important, there are other biomes, such as savannas, woodlands, and the "Succulent Karoo" biome that are often underrepresented. In an analysis of endemism patterns in Namibia, Simmons et al. (1998) also found the Succulent Karoo and the Kaoko Escarpment to be needing protection. As of 1998, the Namib Desert constituted 69% of the PANs, while the savanna and woodlands only constituted 7.5% and 8.4%, respectively. The Succulent Karoo biome only represented 1.6% of the protected areas.

There are over 15 different Non-profit organizations that are dedicated to anti-poaching and conservation efforts.

== Sustainability of communal wildlife conservancies ==
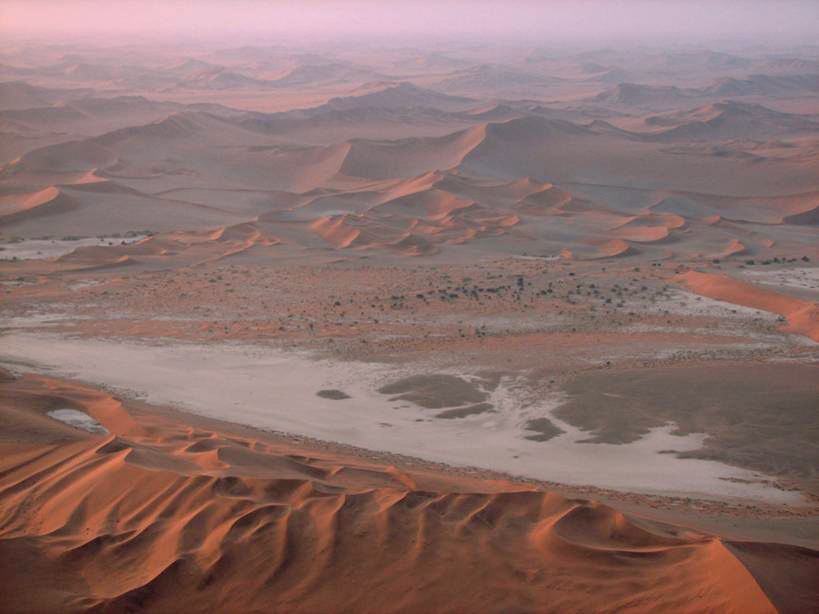
Namib Desert, 2007.

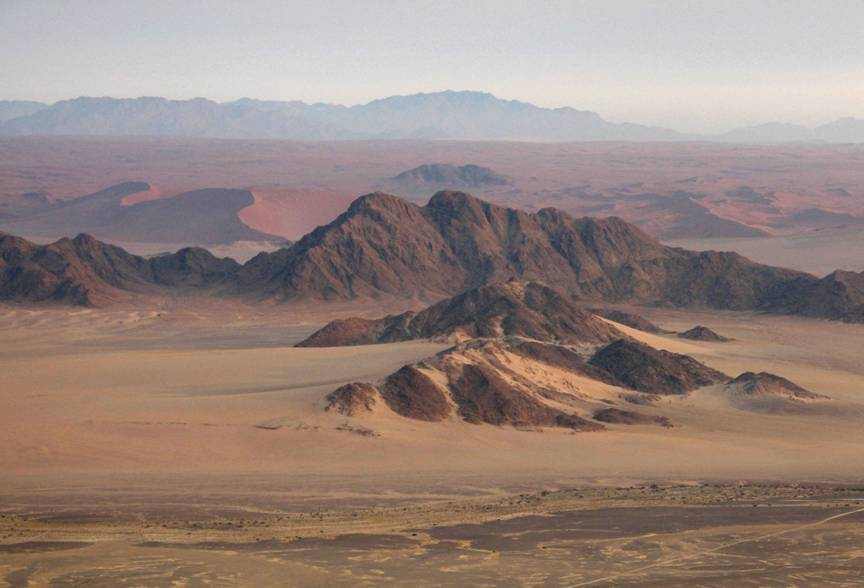
Namibian Escarpment, 2007.

Moringa trees, Namibia, 2007.

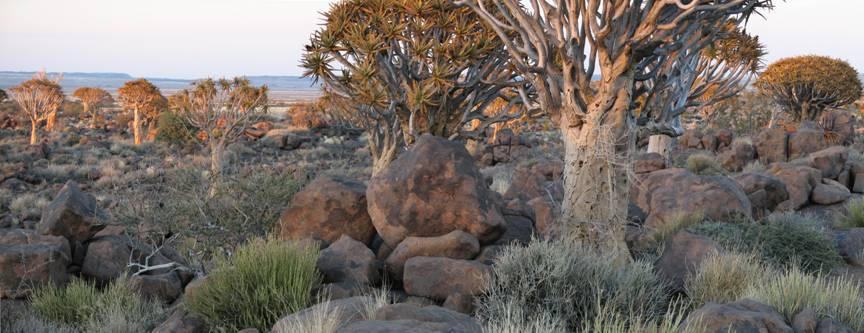
Quivertree forest, Namibia, 2007.

Sunset in Namibia, 2007.

A study of cattle ranching vs. "wildlife ranching" in the neighboring country of Zimbabwe found that wildlife ranching was more profitable, but depended on diverse populations and large land areas. Wildlife ranching is the promotion of wild populations that offer some economic value, for example, the production of bushmeat, trophy hunting, or sightseeing safaris. The conservancies in Namibia allow the local people significant discretion in how they allocate the land to cattle ranching, farming, or protecting wildlife with a view toward economic and environmental sustainability. Because there is growing interest in biodiversity and ecotourism, the conservancies often encourage wildlife ranching or similar activities. Instead of largely unsustainable and economically tenuous agricultural activities, the conservancies harvest income for the local population from the tourists and trophy hunters.

The same study found that low capital investment needs compared to cattle ranching introduced significantly less risk to the conservancies. In addition to lower start-up and maintenance costs, the profitability per unit of biomass was also higher, especially on larger land areas where resident herds of wild animals remained for long periods of time. This profitability came from the improved value of meat but most significantly from the interest that tourism and hunting have in wildlife. Few people would spend large sums of money to travel in the bush to see domestic cattle.

A study done in neighboring South Africa found that younger community members thought most highly of their conservancies, primarily because of the increase in employment opportunities and the improved economic situation of the communities. Others, particularly cattle ranchers, viewed the conservancies with dissatisfaction as they tended to reduce range grazing opportunities in favor of reserved – or in some cases restored – land for wildlife. King (2007) also found that the economic expectations of the particular conservancy were not met. However, King (2007) interpreted this as a result of unrealistic expectations and a concern for international ideals that did not consider the community out of which the conservancy was formed.

The value of communal wildlife conservancies toward biodiversity maintenance cannot be ignored. Wildlife conservancies promote biodiversity in numerous ways. By protecting the primary animals of economic value, the animals and plants that support or depend on the primary animals are also protected, and the majority of the land remains in a natural state. A 2002 paper found that a game reserve in Tanzania (in a comparable situation to the conservancies in Namibia) was unsustainable for several reasons. The central government of Tanzania has set aside a large portion of land for the conservation and controlled hunting of game in the Kilombero river valley. The findings in the paper indicate that in areas of the reserve that were patrolled by national wildlife agents, game was relatively plentiful. However, the majority of the reserve was poorly patrolled, leaving game animals over-harvested and significantly stressed by poaching and agricultural activity. Poaching mostly occurred to supply meat to supplement local people's diets, but a significant number of rhinoceros and elephant were taken by trophy hunters. The problem is compounded if the rules were enforced since that would prevent the locals access to quality protein from their hunting activities. Because the patrol of large areas by government wildlife agents is not possible due mostly to monetary issues, the poaching continues and the population of wildlife declines.

The Communal Areas Management Programme for Indigenous Resources (CAMPFIRE) in Zimbabwe is an example of a successful transfer of power from the well-intentioned, but poorly effective and overly standardized national government to the local people. CAMPFIRE allowed the establishment of community control over game and land resources, and also the collection and retention of fees for wildlife hunting and sightseeing. The funds collected stay primarily in the community and are used for local development projects, including schools, clinics and rural infrastructure. This improvement in quality of life has made wildlife protection more valuable as a resource to the communities. There is significant evidence that the rate of poaching has decreased so much that hunting quotas could be, and have been increased – thereby increasing local revenue. The local communities manage the wildlife and wildland of their conservancies as resources that, if sustained, have the potential to provide continuous sources of both meat and income.

A study found that CAMPFIRE was successful in its primary aims, notably rural development and sustainable wildlife management. To illustrate this success, it was noted that many locals viewed the benefits of the CAMPFIRE conservancy so highly that they would tolerate some level of crop destruction by wildlife, rather than kill a valuable resource. The CAMPFIRE program and the study findings should apply well to Namibia and its communal conservancies as they are almost the same in both idea and implementation. However, due to recent political events in Zimbabwe, the continued success of CAMPFIRE within Zimbabwe may be questionable.

The importance of some measure of control over their lives and surroundings to individuals and communities is readily apparent. The control given to the community members of the conservancies was found to motivate them to administer and sustain the land area more effectively than the national government had been able to. A study done to understand the lack of success in several other types of wildlife and habitat sustainability programs, showed that the two biggest failings were: a poor or generic understanding of the affected communities, and a lack of community involvement within each specific program. Trophy hunters and ecotourists can go elsewhere, but the local population is usually not able to move. Not understanding the need to include the local stakeholders and their access to benefits or concern over burdens prompted the locals to largely ignore various aspects of previous sustainability plans. Many of these failings can be attributed to pressure from foreign governments and non governmental organizations whose primary interests may have generally ignored local populations.

In addition to a better understanding of the stakeholders' needs, the decrease in cost of some GIS software and other easy-to-use systems of information organization dramatically increased the effectiveness of community control of conservancies. Both national and provincial governments can obtain a relatively affordable amount of equipment and trained staff to construct databases with information collected from the locals and from other sources. They can then combine this information into readably usable maps for locals to use in their administration of each conservancy. Maps produced by this method highlight information of local concern and allow leaders to build consensus and to resolve community resource use issues, as well as giving everyone involved a "big-picture" view of their conservancy. Bringing even modest amounts of technology to underdeveloped portions of the country allowed significant progress toward the management and sustainability of communities and their resources.

== See also ==
- Wildlife of Namibia
- Community-based conservation
