= Community based forest management in the Philippines =

Work done to ensure sustainability of forest resources in the Philippines

Community-based forest management (CBFM) constitutes “a powerful paradigm that evolved out of the failure of state forest governance to ensure the sustainability of forest resources and the equitable distribution of access to and benefits from them”. In 1995, the Philippine government adopted CBFM as a national scheme to promote sustainable forest governance, in recognition of the negative impacts occurring as a result of widespread forest loss across the country. The scheme stresses the importance of involving communities in sustaining the forest through projects such as timber harvesting, agro-forestry and livestock raising. CBFM therefore advocates an increasingly ‘bottom up’ – as opposed to the historically ‘top down’ and centralised - approach to sustainable forest governance involving a variety of stakeholders. By 2005, 5503 projects had been established across the country. For this reason the Philippines has been considered a pioneer within Asia for the successful implementation of CBFM as a nationwide tool of forest governance.

CBFM has resulted in varying levels of success across the country, primarily due to unstable policies, poor policy implementation and a lack of funding and assistance by the local and national governments. Successful projects tend to a result of strong government backing, strong community will to succeed in sustainable forest management, and international funding and technical assistance. The varying degree of success implies that many challenges still remain if CBFMs objectives are to be successfully achieved on a national scale. In addition, uncontrollable levels of deforestation remains a problem in the Philippines, with current forest cover at 25.7% and many rural and upland communities still well under the poverty line.

== History and origins ==
CBFM in the Philippines emerged as a result of several driving forces including ‘forest and environmental degradation’ and ‘inequitable access to forest resources and benefits’. These can be attributed to the historically unsustainable forest management practices adopted by centralised governments.

Forest cover in the Philippines has declined significantly from 92% in 1575 to 24% in 2003. Under the centralised forest management regime of Ferdinand Marcos between 1970 and 1980, annual deforestation was particularly high at 300,000 hectares. As a result of this deforestation, the Philippines had one of the highest forest losses in the Asia-Pacific region at the turn of the century. The large extent of forest loss in the country can be illustrated by the change from the country being a “major exporter of tropical logs in the late 1950s until 60s to now being a major importer of wood and wood products”.

The centralised forest management policies formed within the pioneering period (1975–1986) are thought to have “primarily benefited the privileged few instead of the millions of people living in upland areas who depend on the forests resources for survival”. The Marcos government placed a third of the total forest in the country (8-12 million ha) under the control of 450-470 big companies with Timber Licence Agreements (TLA) whilst the “indigenous were regarded as squatters in their own lands... and were treated as culprits for forest destruction”. Widespread poverty ensued in the upland communities that rely on the forests for maintaining their livelihoods.

The negative impacts of the centralised approach to forest control led civil society to strongly advocate a shift in the control of local resources to communities who could benefit socio-economically from as well as manage the forest more suitably. The government responded to these calls for a more people-orientated forestry programme by issuing executive order no.263 in 1995. This was titled “adopting community-based forest management as a national scheme to ensure the sustainable development of the country’s forest lands resources and providing mechanisms for its implementation”. Under this order, local communities can obtain long term tenure rights to forest land and resource use permits (RUPs) from the Department of Environment and Natural Resources (DENR), provided that they employ environmentally friendly, ecologically sustainable and labour-intensive harvesting methods. Communities under CBFM are to elect a people’s organisation (PO) to represent a particular project in talks with other stakeholders. Some of the practices that communities have engaged in under CBFM range from agro-forestry and timber harvesting to livestock raising. The government aimed to place at least 9 million hectares of forests under CBFM by 2008.

== Case studies ==
=== YISEDA ===
The Young Innovators for Social & Environmental Development Association (YISEDA) - a group of 34 local men - was formed under CBFM in 1993 to promote the sustainable use of the forests in the province of Southern Leyte by protecting natural forests and promoting reforestation efforts. The area has witnessed rapid forest loss mainly through illegal logging and therefore was a prime target for the CBFM scheme. Under CBFM, communities were “taught to cut down indigenous trees and to sustain plantation areas for the harvest of timber”. The DENR tenure rights allow the communities to harvest the trees from the 34 hectare plantations that they themselves have set up. The success of the initiative was limited by a lack of government investment in the beginning, although investment from Deutsche Gesellschaft for Internationale Zusammenarbeit (GIZ) - a German government agency - has been vital to YISEDA’s success. GIZ provided YISEDA with a 5-year reforestation plan along with the funding (P5 million) and technical assistance to implement the plan.

=== NPPFRDC ===
The Ngan, Panansalan, Pagsabangan Forest Resources Development Cooperative (NPPFRDC) emerged from CBFM as a scheme to promote the sustainable harvest of timber and improve social justice. NPPFRC is located in Compostela in Southern Philippines which was awarded CBFM in 1996, giving them “the rights and responsibilities to manage and protect 14,800 ha of forest land”. In 2004 the NPPFRC totalled 324 members - which including associated families - totalled to 1,051 people being dependent on the coop’s activities and success. The cooperative themselves created a management framework under which “535 ha (5%) out of the 11,113 ha of production forest, with an estimated timber volume of 21,400 m3, will be harvested over the next five years”. The coop’s success relies on strong relationships between the communities and other actors including the local government, log buyers and the Community Environment and Natural Resource Office (CENRO).

== Successes ==
The successes of CBFM in the Philippines have been limited by the fact that, in the minds of the people, CBFM was only a ‘project’ instead of a long-term forest management scheme. Therefore, as projects finished, much of the initiatives that had gone into the schemes were terminated.

One project which is hailed as a great success from the Philippines CBFM initiative is the case study of YISEDA. The entitlement of land to manage has successfully altered the mindset of the communities involved to care more for the importance of the forests in which they live instead of degrading them. The YISEDA managed to overcome economic hardship in the beginning due to lack of government funding to maintain protection of the forest. This was partly because the communities started to see the economic and livelihood benefits of protecting and sustainably managing the forest. The government of the Philippines recognised the initial success of the YISEDA by entrusting its members another 150 ha of CBFM land to manage. The community themselves are promoting the long term sustainability of the project through education of their youth so the scheme can be successfully run for generations to come. Development funding of P5 million from GIZ played a big part in the long term success of YISEDA who, by 2001 started to reap the rewards of their hardship with a harvest of 66 hardwoods at a cost of P5,000 each.

Across the country, the scheme has established 5503 projects covering an area of approximately 6 million hectares by 2005. According to Pulhin, a number of studies have found that the projects have added to the sustainability of the projects by increasing forest cover, making technological advances and improving relations between actors through collective action.

== Failures ==
Numerous failures surrounding the implementation of CBFM have occurred across the Philippines. Despite the few successes - such as the YIDEDA - many communities under CBFM schemes have come across numerous challenges in achieving the goals and objectives of the scheme as detailed below:

- Unstable policies:The limited and potentially short-term success of nationwide CBFM schemes including the NPPFRDC was mainly thought to be as a result of “unstable and restrictive forest policy”. The DENR have the power to suspend resource use permits (RUPs) which allow CBFM schemes to extract and utilise forest resources inside the designated area. When this occurs widespread loss of livelihood and forest destruction ensues. The impact of three RUP suspensions on the NPPFRDC caused major disruption of operations and resulted in economic losses of around $2.4 million in 2003 alone. In addition, unemployment increased forcing many locals into illegal logging to maintain their livelihoods. More seriously, however, over 1000 CBFMs were cancelled by the DENR nationwide by 2003, resulting in loss of livelihood and forest destruction in former CBFM areas in the Philippines.
- Restrictive policies:Stipulated in the agreements made between YISEDA and the government, “YISEDA can only cut down trees from plantation areas measuring at least 30 centimetres in diameter”. For this reason it is only recently that the trees planted in the early 1990s by YISEDA could be harvested and sold on the market. Before this the YISEDA had very little income on which to maintain their livelihoods, and were strongly relying on the uncertain future success of the CBFM.
- Lack of government funding and technical assistance:The poor technical assistance can be explained by the insufficient numbers of qualified technical staff at DENR in the early years with the knowledge required to assist CBFM projects. YISEDA struggled at first, having to motivate members to help with reforestation even though it lacked technical knowledge on agro-forestry and funding from DENR. Eventually, economic and technical assistance was provided by GIZ, and YISEDA thrived, but otherwise the chances of succeeding would have been much more unlikely. The NPPFRDC has had to bear the brunt of many of the costs themselves which has significantly inhibited their progress.
- Reliance on International assistance:The government has been criticised for its inability to see CBFM projects through in the long run with the removal of funding too soon. A number of CBFMs would have not succeeded if it wasn’t for international funding and technical assistance, such as that provided by GIZ in the YISEDA scheme. GIZ provided not only funding but also a clear plan of action for forest regeneration which the YISEDA scheme lacked previously due to poor guidance by DENR.
- Site to site variances in support:As evident in the case studies of YISEDA and NPPFRDC, there are disparities in the level of success that CBFM has had, suggesting that the level of support given to a project is highly dependent on location. As a result, this has led many to doubt the effectiveness of CBFM as a national tool for sustainable forest management.

== Challenges that remain ==
LL Rebugio stated, "Despite wide coverage of areas devolved to local communities, totalling close to 6 million ha, current nationwide outcomes of state-initiated national community forestry programs and projects in the Philippines are still far from achieving their stated objectives". Challenges remain within all aspects of CBFMs if these objectives are to be met in the future; from strengthening the weakening support by government policies to challenges within the community to ensure that benefits are sustained after the projects are completed. The NPPFRDCs success is dependent on these developments in the near future Governments must allow CBFMs to have increased formal involvement in the decision-making process and policy changes that can impact positively on their lives. Additionally, at a local level “strategic interventions are still needed to achieve the social justice and equality objectives of CBFM” thus addressing the observation in some projects that the community elites and educated are benefiting the most.
