= Community-based conservation =

Conservation movement emerging in the 1980s

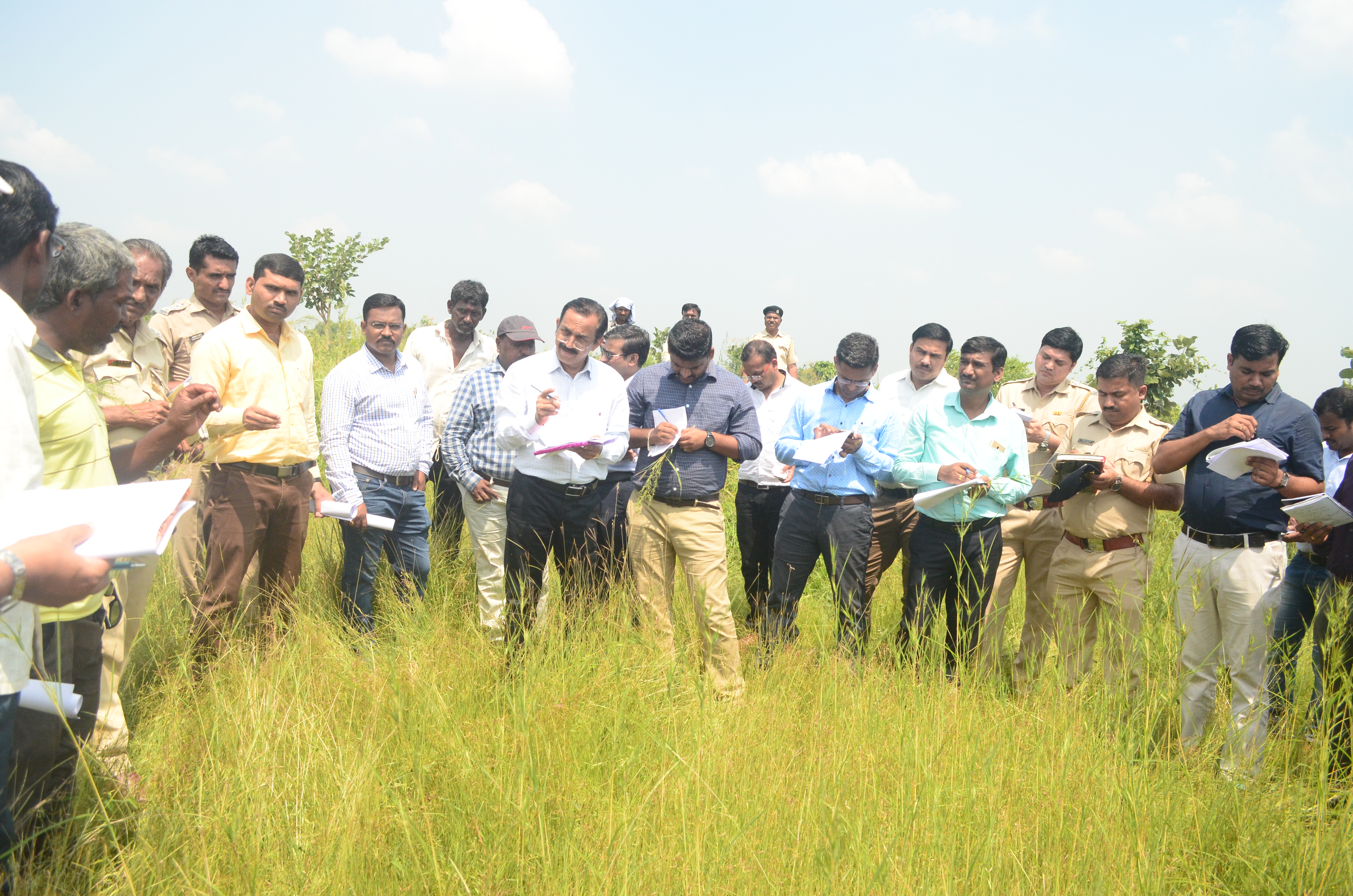
Members of a group involved in community-based grassland conservation in Akola District, Maharashtra, India.

Community-based conservation (CBC) is a conservation movement that emerged in the 1980s, also in response to escalating protests and subsequent dialogue with local communities affected by international attempts to protect the biodiversity of the earth. These contentions were a reaction against 'top down' conservation practices, imposed by governments or large organisations and perceived as disregarding the interests of local inhabitants, often based upon the Western idea of nature being separate from culture. The objective of some CBC initiatives is to actively involve some members of local communities in the conservation efforts that affect them, incorporating improvement to their lives while conserving nature through the creation of national parks or wildlife refuges.

A more radical understanding of 'community conservation' highlights the conservation value of the historically careful, sustainable and in many ways protective interaction of human communities with their natural environments. In this light, Indigenous Peoples and local communities have the capacity of being 'custodians' of their 'territories of life'. This capacity comes to life depending on a combination of factors, some of which are intrinsic to the communities themselves and others depend on their ecological, economic and political context. In particular, State governments, international agencies and the private sector need to allow and support communities, rather than impeding them in their custodian role. Colonialism, neo-colonialism, economic growth 'at all costs' and perennial war are the true enemies of Nature. Empowered, aware and self-determined communities are her natural allies. The clearest example is offered by the hundreds of community members killed, and the thousands maimed and oppressed, every year, as they try to defend their environments from extractive and destructive imposed developments.

== History ==
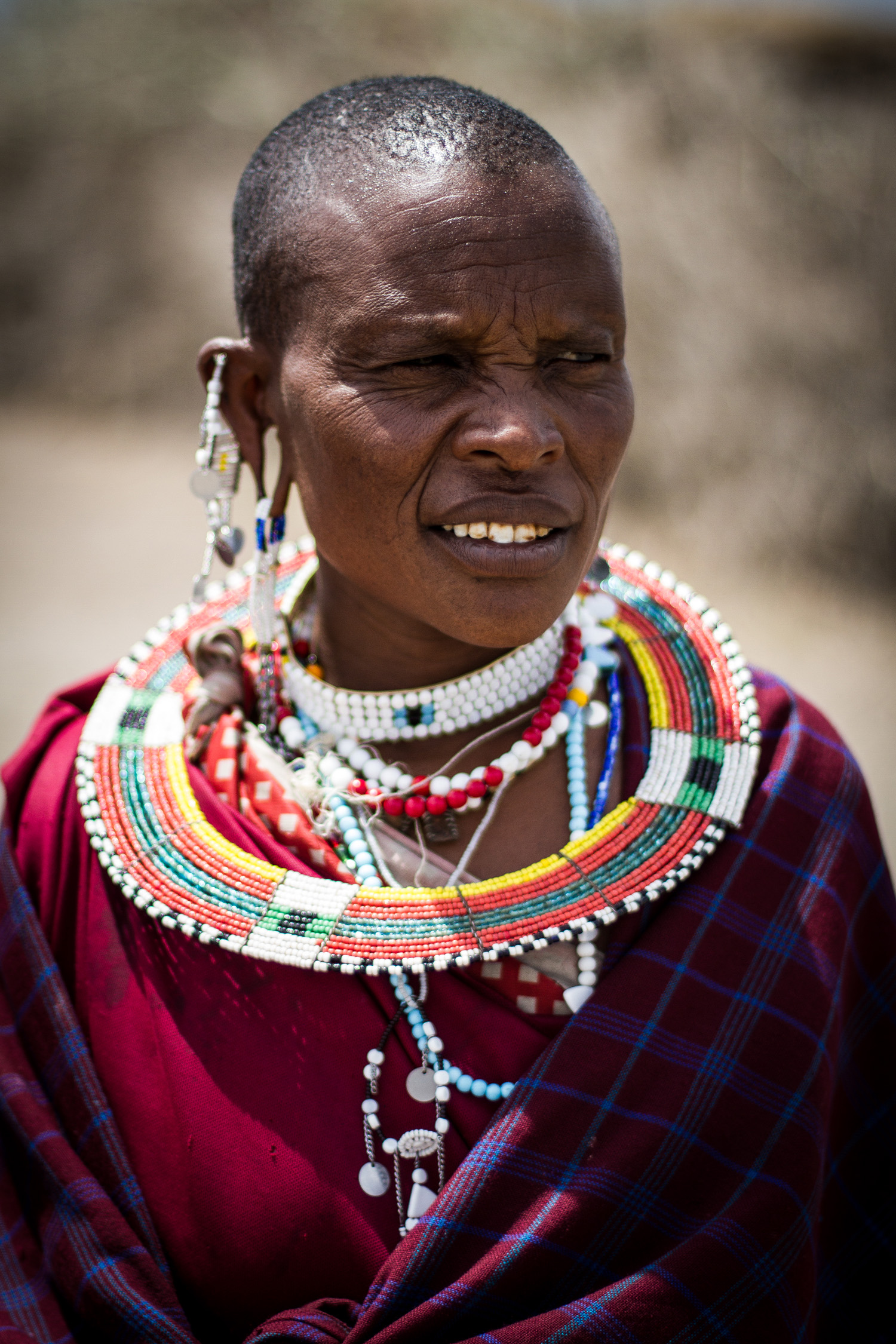
Massai herders affected by conservation zoning from Ngorongoro Conservation Area, Tanzania.

The emergence of CBC is deeply tied to the legacy of colonial conservation practices and the political struggles they provoked. Early conservation efforts, particularly the establishment of national parks like Yellowstone (1872) and Yosemite (1890), followed a "fortress conservation" model: nature was to be preserved by excluding people. This model ignored Indigenous land stewardship and often involved the forced displacement of local communities—an approach later replicated across Africa, Asia, and Latin America during colonial and post-colonial periods. Estimates suggest that more than 20 million people have been displaced globally under exclusionary conservation regimes.

By the mid-20th century, critiques of this model intensified. Scholars and activists pointed to the ethical and ecological failings of removing communities from their ancestral lands. In 1975, the International Union for Conservation of Nature (IUCN) first acknowledged that traditional ways of life could support biodiversity conservation.

The term "community-based conservation" gained traction in the 1980s and 1990s as both a critique of top-down environmentalism and an alternative rooted in participatory governance, local knowledge, and equitable benefit-sharing. Landmark events helped solidify its legitimacy: the 2003 World Parks Congress in Durban and the 2004 Convention on Biological Diversity meeting in Kuala Lumpur formally recognized the role of Indigenous Peoples and local communities in governing protected areas. This momentum continued with the Sydney Congress in 2014, which affirmed that territories conserved by communities hold conservation value equal to that of state-managed protected areas.

== Strategies ==
CBC relies on a variety of strategies that align ecological stewardship with local empowerment. These approaches seek to replace exclusionary models of environmental protection with participatory frameworks that acknowledge the cultural, political, and economic realities of communities living with biodiversity.

=== 1. Co-management and local governance ===
A widespread approach is co-management, in which responsibilities for protected areas are shared between state institutions and local communities. This strategy blends traditional ecological knowledge with scientific input and has been applied in various contexts across Africa and Asia.

=== 2. Customary institutions and Indigenous-led conservation ===
CBC programs frequently aim to strengthen customary governance systems, recognizing Indigenous communities as effective stewards of biodiversity. Territories managed under traditional practices, often termed Territories of Life, have shown high conservation value.

=== 3. Sustainable livelihoods and benefit-sharing ===
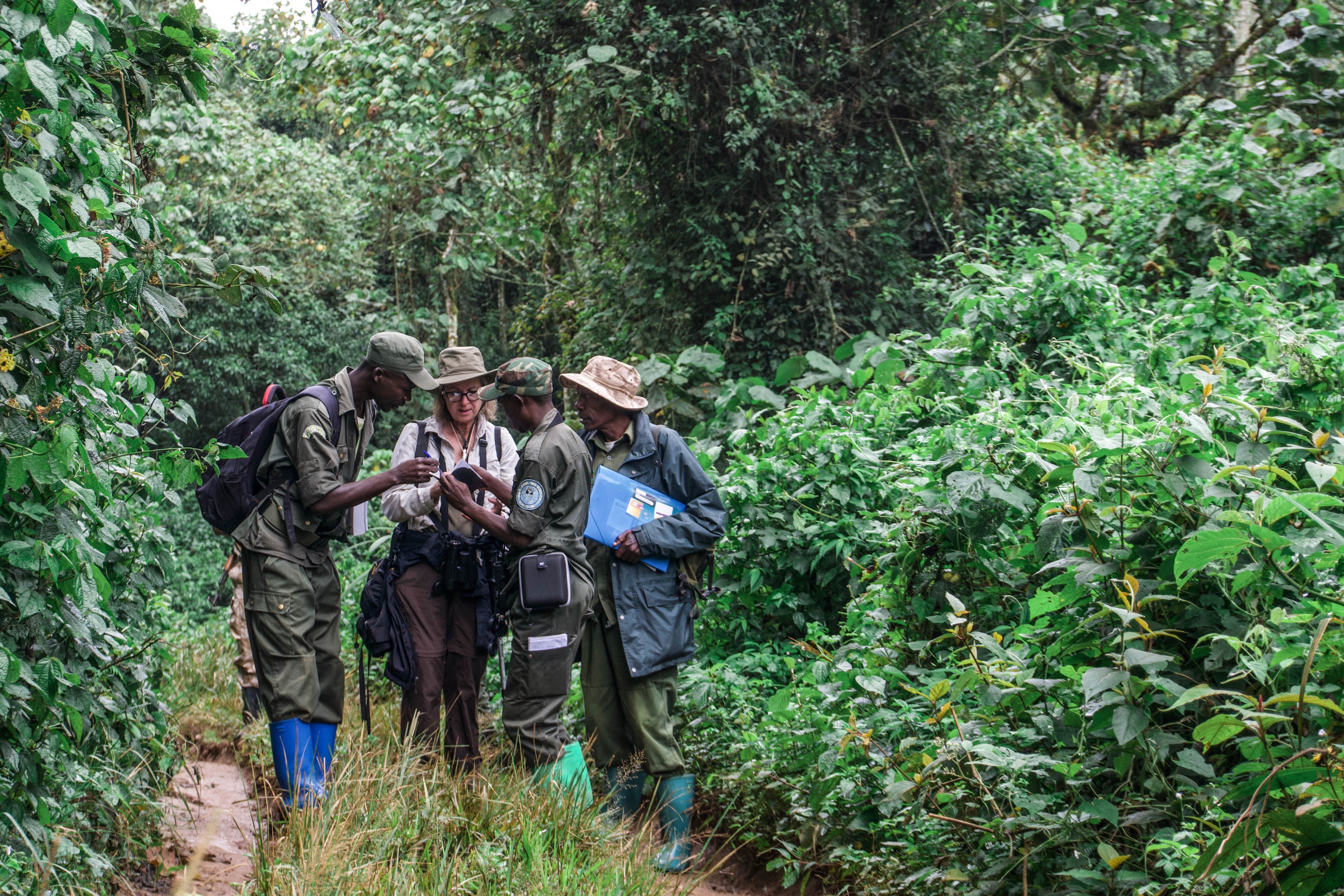
Ecotourist guides from Virunga and Kahuzi-Biega National Parks being trained on bird watching guiding to further diversify ecotourism activities within the parks and develop local expertise.

Economic strategies within CBC include ecotourism, rotational grazing, non-timber forest products, sustainable fisheries, and carbon-based initiatives. When benefits are distributed equitably, these models can generate support for conservation. However, unequal distribution and elite capture remain challenges in many projects.

=== 4. Community-based ecological restoration ===
Communities also lead ecological restoration. In Indonesia, local groups have restored peatlands through rewetting, paludiculture, and replanting, aiding both biodiversity and carbon sequestration. Similar efforts in Central Java showed that local participation in land rehabilitation improved sediment control and soil conservation.

=== 5. Participatory monitoring and adaptive management ===
In many CBC efforts, communities monitor biodiversity and habitat conditions, providing data for adaptive management. This not only enhances ecological outcomes but also builds local knowledge and leadership.

Ecosystem-Based Adaption is an example of a form of adaptation management strategy that aims to provide community livelihood safety nets as well as food security physical assets, mobilization and security of resources and public health.

=== 6. Legal recognition and institutional support ===
Legal frameworks that acknowledge communal land rights are essential for long-term success. Without them, communities face risks of marginalization or dispossession despite their conservation roles.

== Impact ==
=== Ecological impacts ===
CBC tends to be most effective where traditional ecological knowledge is recognized, governance is inclusive, and conservation goals align with the everyday needs of communities.

In some regions, CBC has been associated with improvements in vegetation cover, biodiversity, and soil health. For example, in parts of Kenya, community-managed lands have shown higher nutrient levels and increased primary productivity, reflecting positive environmental recovery. Also, in the CBC has been proven to reduce degradation, restore hydrology, and improve biodiversity when applied in tropical wetlands in Indonesia.

Kuala Selangor Nature Park Community Mangrove Nursery (Malaysia), where the local community members planted mangrove saplings in the surrounding area.

In other cases, ecological benefits have been more limited or inconsistent. In Madagascar, outcomes have included localized reductions in forest loss, but also instances where environmental pressure was displaced to surrounding areas. Conservation initiatives often struggled to maintain long-term effectiveness when they lacked sustained support or failed to integrate with local livelihoods.

=== Community impacts ===
CBC's ability to support communities depends on how decisions are made, how benefits are shared, and whether local voices are genuinely included in shaping conservation efforts. In several African regions, this approach has contributed to improved access to education and healthcare, stronger community institutions, and greater food security through locally managed grazing systems and resource distribution. In some cases, income from tourism and conservation-related employment has supported local livelihoods.

However, CBC has also faced criticism where its implementation has reinforced existing inequalities. In places like Madagascar, the costs of conservation, such as restricted access to land or forest resources, have often fallen disproportionately on poorer households. At the same time, financial and institutional benefits have frequently been concentrated among local elites or external actors. In many cases, community participation has been limited to carrying out decisions made elsewhere, weakening local engagement and trust.

== Emerging constraints ==
The challenges and controversies in horizon scanning reveal a complex landscape of environmental and social issues. With growing violence against environmental human rights defenders and the unpredictability of human migration patterns, the urgency of addressing these issues becomes apparent. Horizon scanning efforts encountered difficulties in balancing novelty with plausibility, impact, and pervasiveness, particularly concerning topics less familiar to collaborators. Moreover, the under-representation of economic and legal expertise in the collaboration underscores the need for diverse perspectives in assessing emerging trends. Discussions often veered into debates over the nature of identified trends and their potential impact, highlighting the nuanced nature of horizon scanning. Amidst these challenges, the significance of CBC emerges as a multifaceted approach that benefits both nature and people. It underscores the inseparability of conservation efforts from ethical considerations and aims to balance biodiversity conservation with human well-being. Ultimately, CBC stands as a strategy for addressing the interconnected crises facing our planet.

Other constraints in Community-Based Conservation is financing projects especially in regards to the ability of Civil Society Organizations (CSOs) to access capital and funding. Community-based conservation efforts require a presence of financial or non-financial incentives to attract stakeholders.

== See also ==
- Community-based management
- Conservation reserves and community reserves of India
- Communal wildlife conservancies in Namibia
- Conservation community
- Indigenous and community conserved area
- Communal Wildlife Conservancies in Namibia
