= Zambezian region =

Biogeographical region in Africa

The Zambezian region is a large biogeographical region in Africa. The Zambezian region includes woodlands, savannas, grasslands, and thickets, extending from east to west in a broad belt across the continent. The Zambezian region lies south of the rainforests of the Guineo-Congolian region. The Zambezian region is bounded by deserts and xeric shrublands on the southwest, the Highveld grasslands of South Africa to the south, and the subtropical Maputaland forests on the southeast.

== Vegetation types ==
The dominant vegetation types in the Zambezian region include:

- Dry deciduous forest and scrub forest
- Zambezian wooded grassland
- Itigi deciduous thicket
- Miombo woodland
- Mopane woodland
- Undifferentiated woodland
- Zambezian flooded grasslands and savannas
- Zambezian halophytics

== Biodiversity ==
Botanist Frank White estimated that the region has 8,500 species of plants, of which 4,590, or 54%, are endemic. Trees from subfamily Detarioideae of the legume family (Fabaceae) are predominant in the region's woodland plant communities, including species of Brachystegia, Julbernardia, and Isoberlinia in miombo woodlands, Baikiaea in Baikiaea woodlands, and mopane (Colophospermum mopane) in mopane woodlands.

The region is a centre of diversity for tree species in the genera Brachystegia (21 species) and Monotes (11 species). The Zambezian Region is a centre of diversity for "underground trees" (geoxylic suffrutices) which grow most of their stems and branches underground. 86 of 98 African species of underground trees identified by Frank White are native to the Zambezian Region.

== Ecoregions ==
According to the World Wildlife Fund, the Zambezian region includes over a dozen ecoregions.

- Angolan miombo woodlands (Angola)
- Angolan mopane woodlands (Angola, Namibia)
- Bushveld (South Africa, Botswana, Zimbabwe)
- Central Zambezian miombo woodlands (Angola, Burundi, Democratic Republic of the Congo, Malawi, Tanzania, Zambia)
- Eastern miombo woodlands (Mozambique, Tanzania)
- Etosha Pan halophytics (Namibia)
- Itigi-Sumbu thicket (Tanzania, Zambia)
- Southern miombo woodlands (Malawi, Mozambique, Zambia, Zimbabwe)
- Western Zambezian grasslands (Angola, Zambia)
- Zambezian Baikiaea woodlands (Angola, Botswana, Namibia, Zambia, Zimbabwe)
- Zambezian Cryptosepalum dry forests (Angola, Zambia)
- Zambezian coastal flooded savanna (Mozambique)
- Zambezian flooded grasslands (Angola, Botswana, Democratic Republic of the Congo, Malawi, Mozambique, Tanzania, Zambia)
- Zambezian halophytics (Botswana, Mozambique)
- Zambezian and mopane woodlands (Botswana, Eswatini, Malawi, Mozambique, Namibia, South Africa, Zambia, Zimbabwe)

== See also ==
- Flora Zambesiaca
