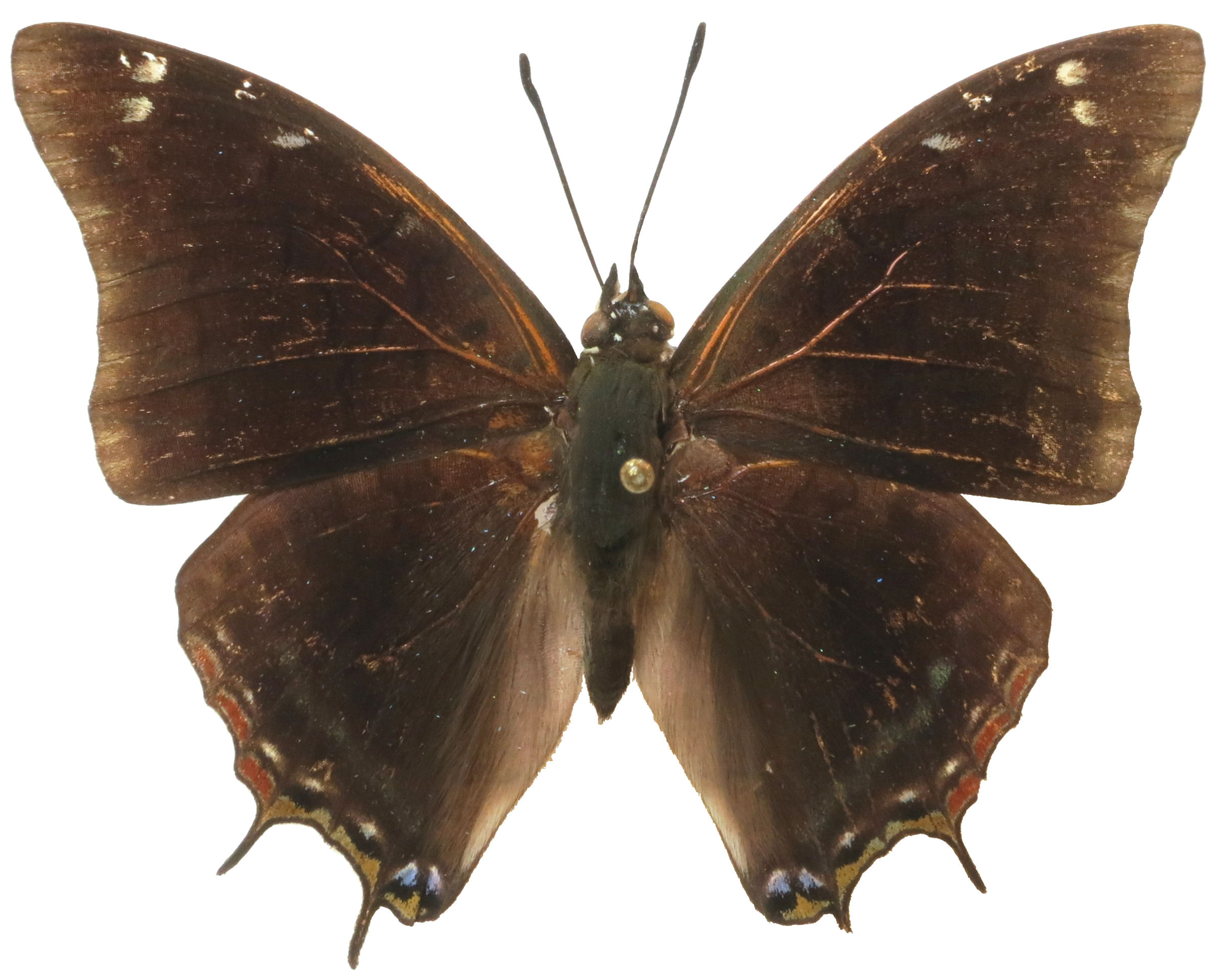
- Charaxes variata - Chiwoma, North-Western Province, Zambia

Scientific classification
- Kingdom: Animalia
- Phylum: Arthropoda
- Class: Insecta
- Order: Lepidoptera
- Family: Nymphalidae
- Genus: Charaxes
- Species: C. variata

Binomial name
- Charaxes variata van Someren, 1969

Synonyms
- Charaxes viola variata van Someren, 1969; Charaxes viola variata f. tricolor van Someren, 1969; Charaxes viola variata f. rosella van Someren, 1969; Charaxes viola variata f. cottrelli van Someren, 1969

= Charaxes variata =

Species of butterfly

Charaxes variata is a butterfly in the family Nymphalidae. It is found in central, southern and north-western and western Zambia. The habitat consists of Cryptosepalum forests.

The larvae feed on Cryptosepalum exfoliatum pseudotaxus, Brachystegia spiciformis, Brachystegia taxifolia and Dicrostachys cinerea.

== Description ==
A full description is provided by Van Someren, V. G. L., 1969 Revisional notes on African Charaxes (Lepidoptera: Nymphalidae). Part V. Bulletin of the British Museum (Natural History) (Entomology) 75–166.

== Taxonomy ==
Charaxes variata is a member of the large species group Charaxes etheocles.

Described as a subspecies of Charaxes viola but ranked as a full species by Williams (2006).
