= Tropical vegetation =

Vegetation in tropical latitude

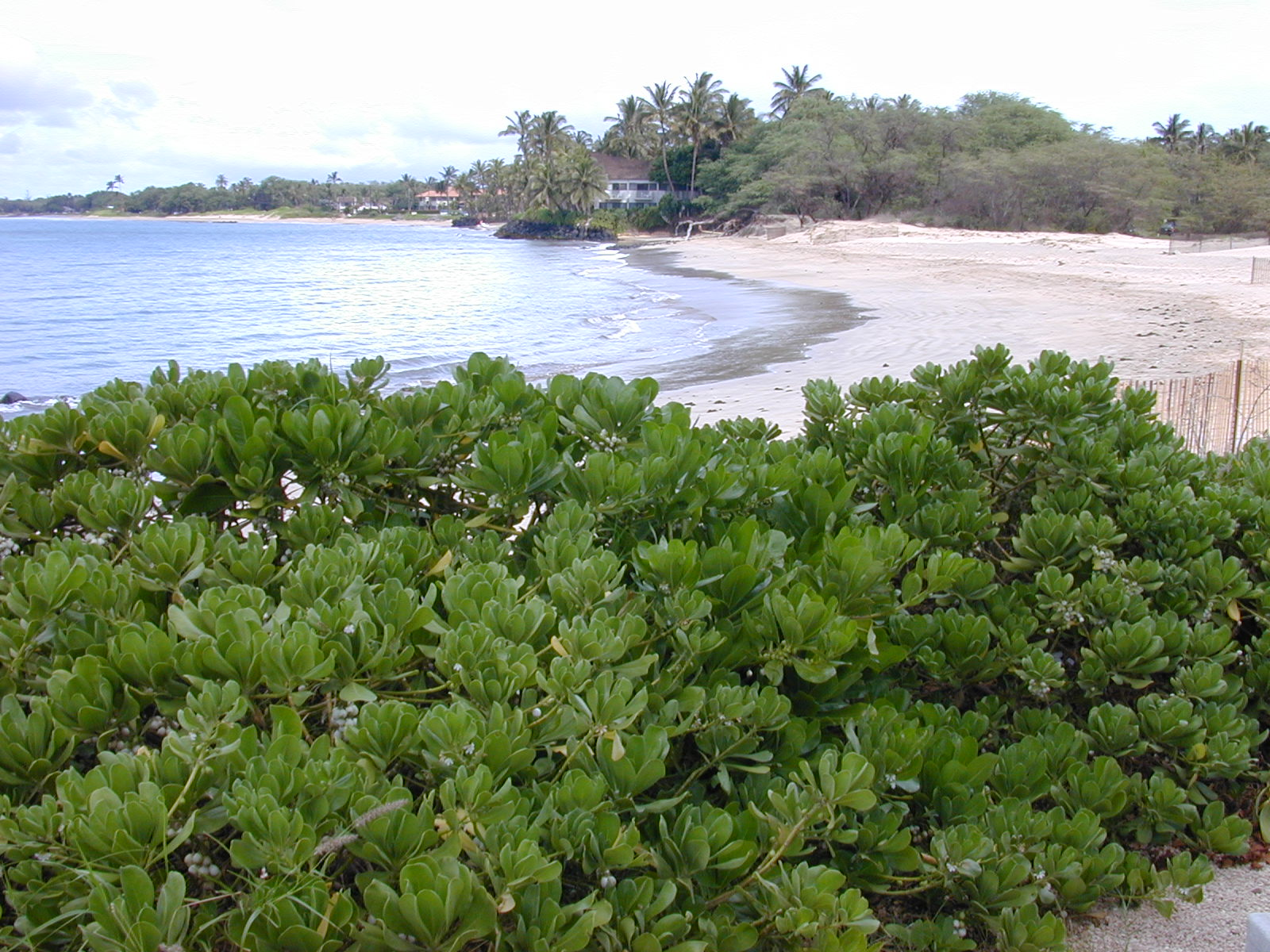
Tropical coastline vegetation in Maui with Scaevola taccada bush in the foreground

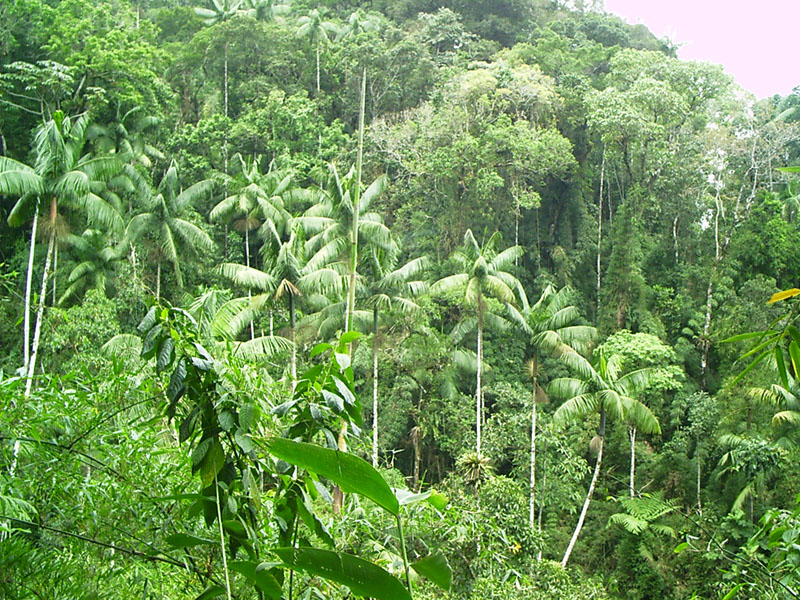
Dense rainforest vegetation in the Itatiaia National Park in Brazil.

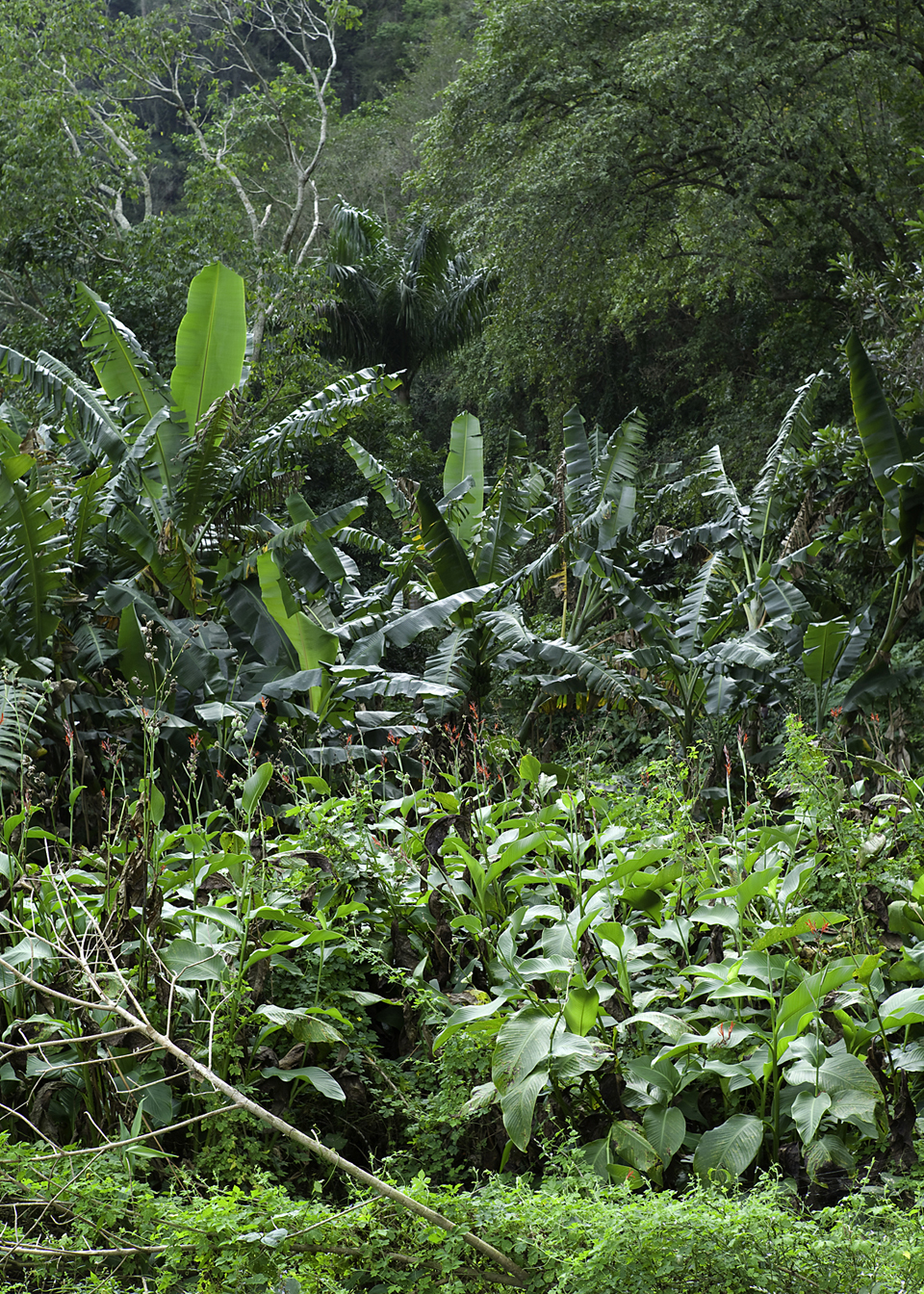
Typical Caribbean vegetation in Cuba.

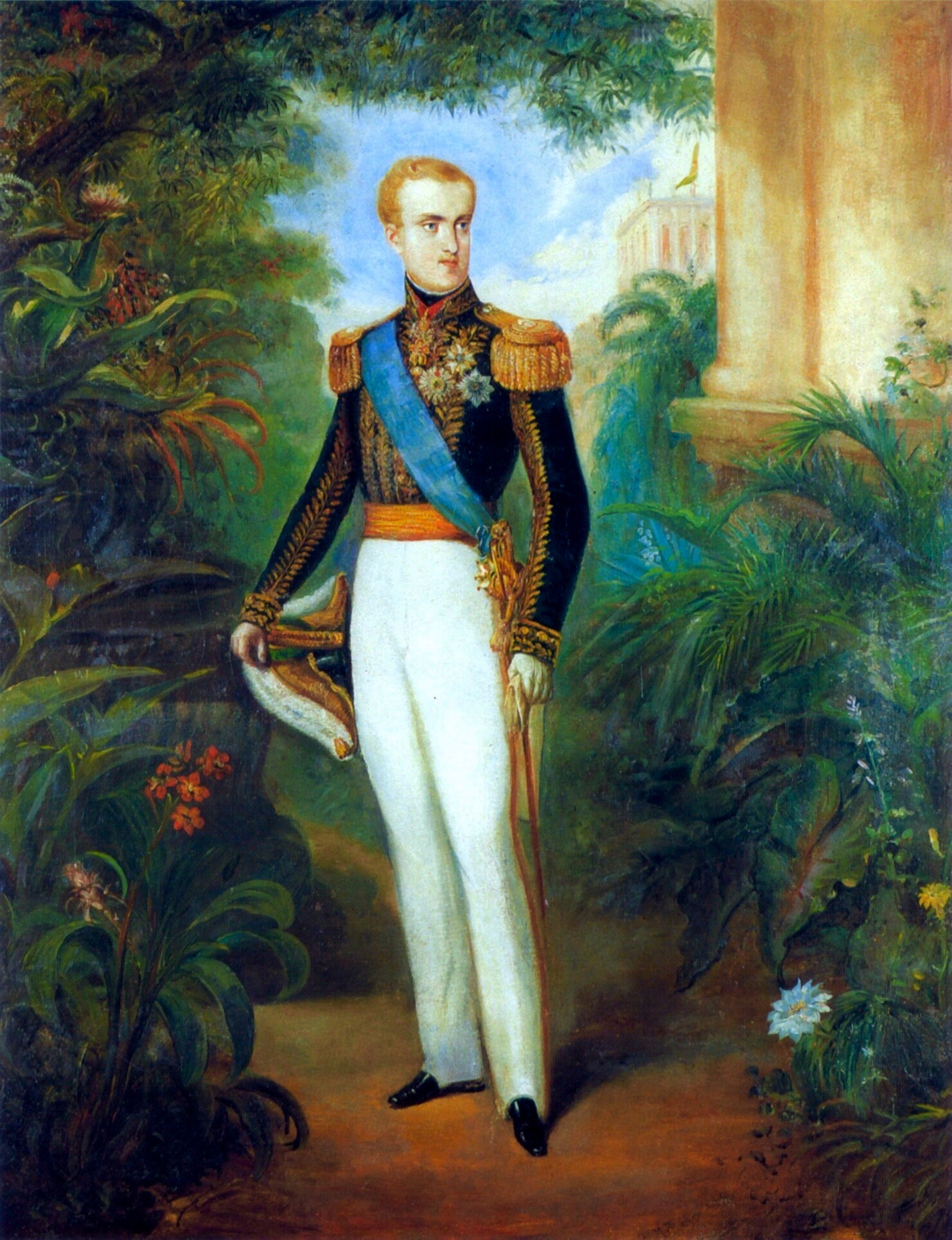
Emperor Pedro II of Brazil surrounded by tropical vegetation at Quinta da Boa Vista, 1846

Tropical vegetation, plant life that occurs in climates that are warm year-round, is in general more biologically diverse than in other latitudes. Some tropical areas may receive abundant rain the whole year round, while others have long dry seasons which last several months and may vary in length and intensity with geographic location. These seasonal droughts have a great impact on the vegetation, such as in the Madagascar spiny forests.

Rainforest vegetation can often be categorized into five layers. The top layer is the emergents, the upper tree layer, with the largest and widest trees in all the forest, commonly 50 m (160 ft) and higher. These trees tend to have very large canopies so they can be fully exposed to sunlight. A layer below that is the canopy, or middle tree layer, averaging 30–40 m (98–131 ft) in height. Here there are more compact trees and vegetation. These trees, shaded, tend to be slenderer. The third layer is the lower tree area. These trees tend to be around 5–10 m (16–33 ft) high and tightly compacted. The trees found in the third layer include young trees with the potential to grow into larger canopy trees, and "palmoids" or "corner model trees". The fourth layer is the shrub layer beneath the tree canopy. This layer is mainly populated by sapling trees, shrubs, and seedlings. The fifth and lowest layer is the herb layer which is the forest floor, mainly bare except for various plants, mosses, lycopods and ferns. The forest floor is much less dense than above because of little sunlight and air movement.

Plant species native to the tropics found in tropical ecosystems are known as tropical plants. Some examples of tropical ecosystems are the Guinean Forests of West Africa, the Madagascar dry deciduous forests and the broadleaf forests of the Thai highlands and the El Yunque National Forest in Puerto Rico. Dr. Ghillean Prance has estimated that, as of 1979, there were 155,000 known species of tropical plants, with 90,000 species in the Neotropics, 35,000 in southern Asia and the East Indies and 30,000 in Africa, about half of those in Madagascar. There are also 50,000 Neotropical fungi, and about 20,000 fungal species each from Asia and Africa.

== Description ==
The term "tropical vegetation" is frequently used in the sense of lush and luxuriant, but not all the vegetation of the areas of the Earth in tropical climates can be defined as such. Despite lush vegetation, often the soils of tropical forests are low in nutrients making them quite vulnerable to slash-and-burn deforestation techniques, which are sometimes an element of shifting cultivation agricultural systems. Tropical vegetation may include the following habitat types:

=== Tropical rainforest ===
Tropical rainforest ecosystems include significant areas of biodiversity, often coupled with high species endemism. Rainforests are home to half of all the living animal and plant species on the planet and roughly two-thirds of all flowering plants can be found in rainforests. The most representative are the Borneo rainforest, one of the oldest rainforests in the world, the Brazilian and Venezuelan Amazon rainforest, and the eastern Costa Rican rainforests.

=== Tropical seasonal forest ===
Seasonal tropical forests generally receive high total rainfall, averaging more than 1000 mm per year, but with a distinct dry season. They include: the Congolian forests, a broad belt of highland tropical moist broadleaf forest which extends across the basin of the Congo River; Central American tropical forests in Panama and Nicaragua; the seasonal forests that predominate across much the Indian subcontinent, Indochina, and Queensland, northern Australia.

=== Tropical dry broadleaf forest ===
Tropical dry broadleaf forests are territories with a forest cover that is not very dense and has often an unkempt, irregular appearance, especially in the dry season. This type of forest often includes bamboo and teak as the dominant large tree species, such as in the Phi Pan Nam Range, part of the Central Indochina dry forests. They are affected by often long seasonal dry periods and, though less biologically diverse than rainforests, tropical dry forests are home to a wide variety of wildlife.

=== Tropical grasslands, savannas, and shrublands ===
Tropical grasslands, savannas, and shrublands are spread over a large area of the tropics with a vegetation made up mainly of low shrubs and grasses, often including sclerophyll species. Some of the most representative are the Western Zambezian grasslands in Zambia and Angola, as well as the Einasleigh upland savanna in Australia and the Everglades in the United States of America. Tree species such as Acacia and baobab may be present in these ecosystems depending on the region.

== See also ==
- Biocoenosis
- Ecoregion
- Jungle
- Vegetation type
