= Cryptosepalum exfoliatum =

Conservation status
- Least Concern (IUCN 3.1)

Scientific classification
- Kingdom: Plantae
- Clade: Tracheophytes
- Clade: Angiosperms
- Clade: Eudicots
- Clade: Rosids
- Order: Fabales
- Family: Fabaceae
- Genus: Cryptosepalum
- Species: C. exfoliatum

Binomial name
- Cryptosepalum exfoliatum De Wild. (1902)

Subspecies
- Cryptosepalum exfoliatum subsp. craspedoneura P.A.Duvign. & Brenan; Cryptosepalum exfoliatum subsp. exfoliatum; Cryptosepalum exfoliatum subsp. pseudotaxus (Baker f.) P.A.Duvign. & Brenan; Cryptosepalum exfoliatum subsp. suffruticans (J.Duvign.) P.A.Duvign. & Brenan

Species of legume

Cryptosepalum exfoliatum is a species of tree native to tropical Africa. It ranges from the Republic of the Congo and Democratic Republic of the Congo to Tanzania, Zambia, Malawi, and Angola. It is the dominant tree species in the Zambezian Cryptosepalum dry forests ecoregion of Zambia and Angola, where it is known locally as "mavunda". Cryptosepalum exfoliatum forests form habitat for the butterfly Mylothris mavunda.

== Subspecies ==
Four subspecies are accepted.

- Cryptosepalum exfoliatum subsp. craspedoneura P.A.Duvign. & Brenan – Zambia
- Cryptosepalum exfoliatum subsp. exfoliatum – Tanzania and Zambia
- Cryptosepalum exfoliatum subsp. pseudotaxus (Baker f.) P.A.Duvign. & Brenan – Congo and DR Congo to Malawi, Zambia, and Angola
- Cryptosepalum exfoliatum subsp. suffruticans (J.Duvign.) P.A.Duvign. & Brenan – Angola and Zambia
