= Jungle =

Impassably dense forest, typically tropical

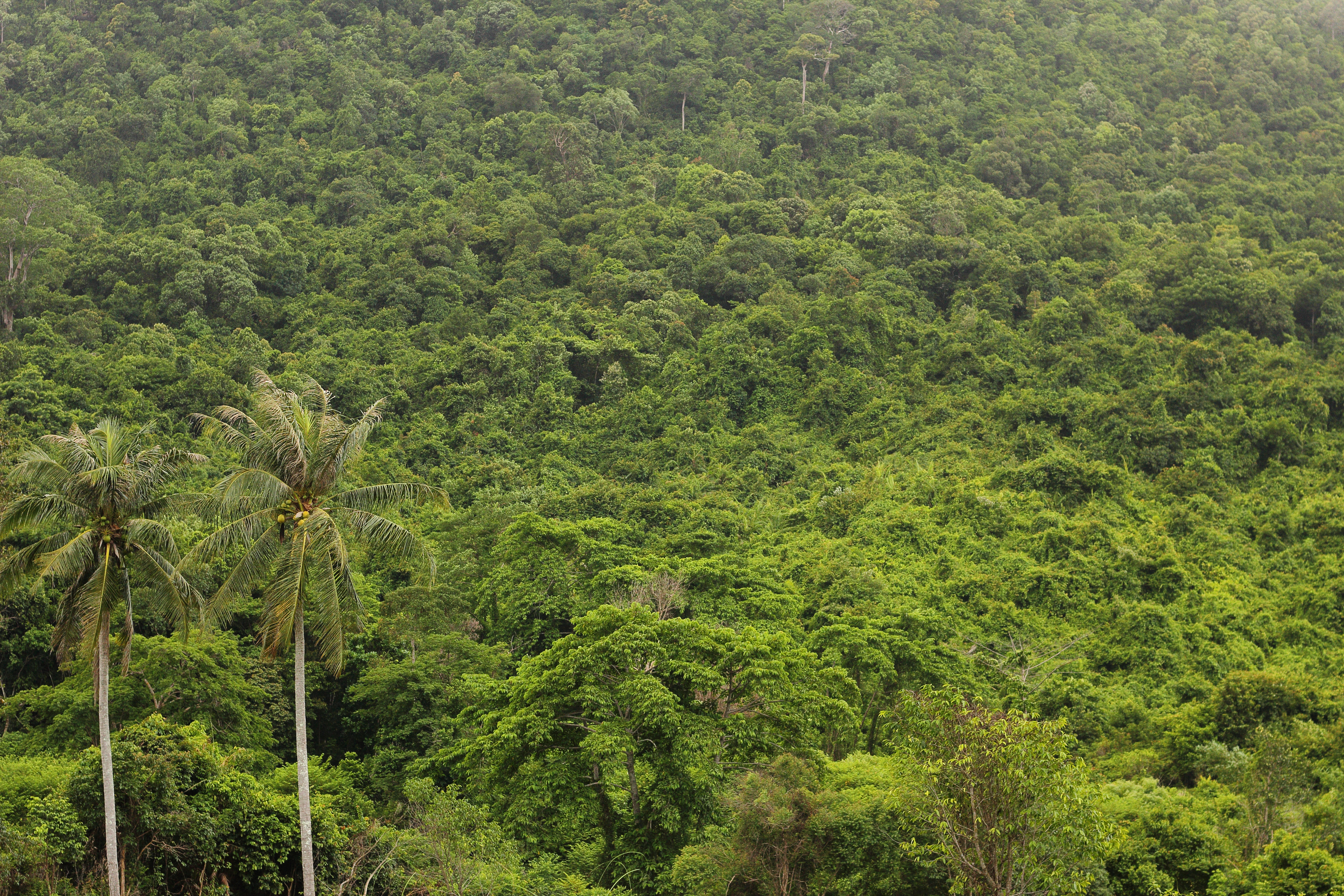
Jungle in Cambodia

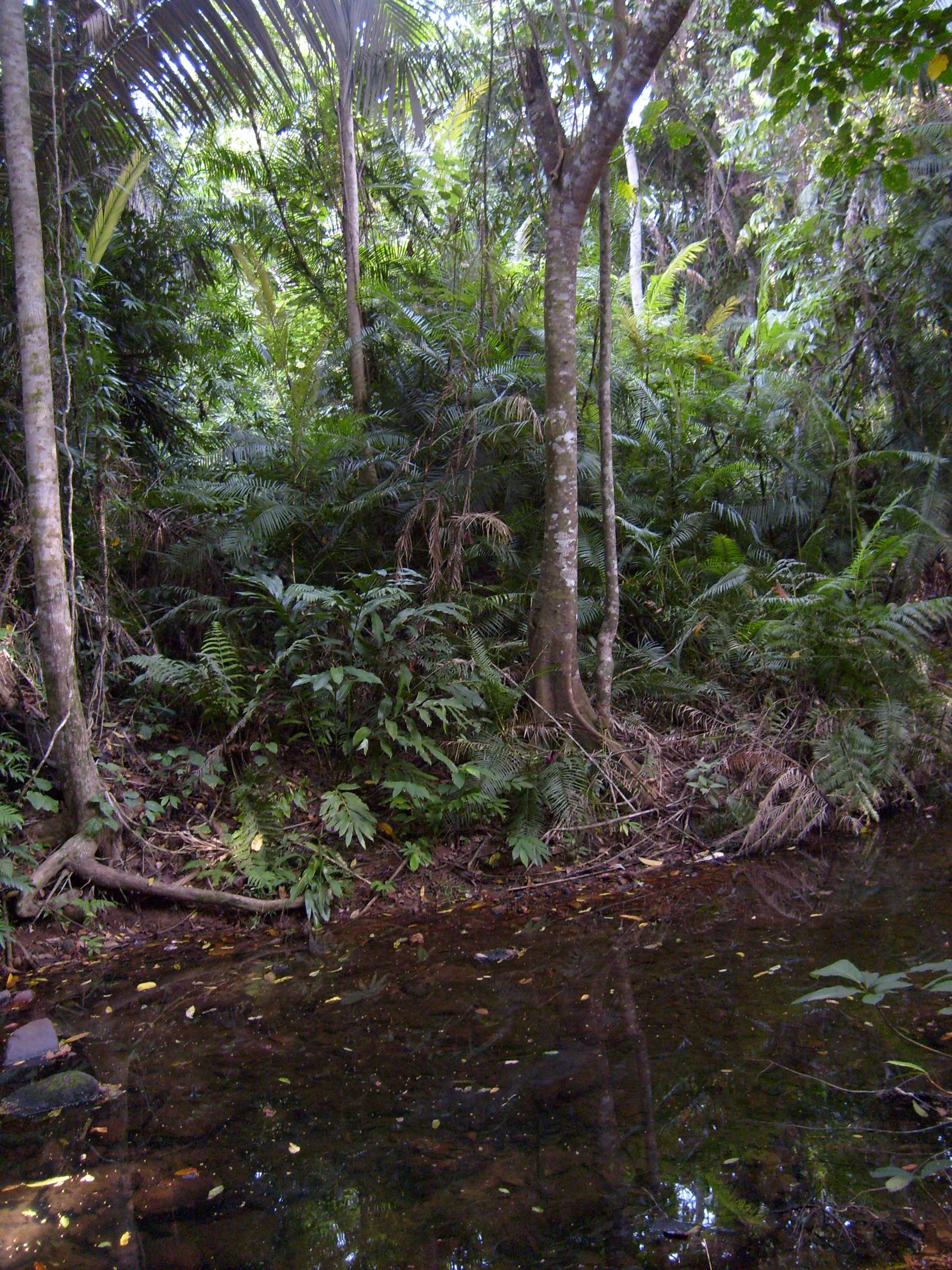
Jungle on Tioman Island, Malaysia

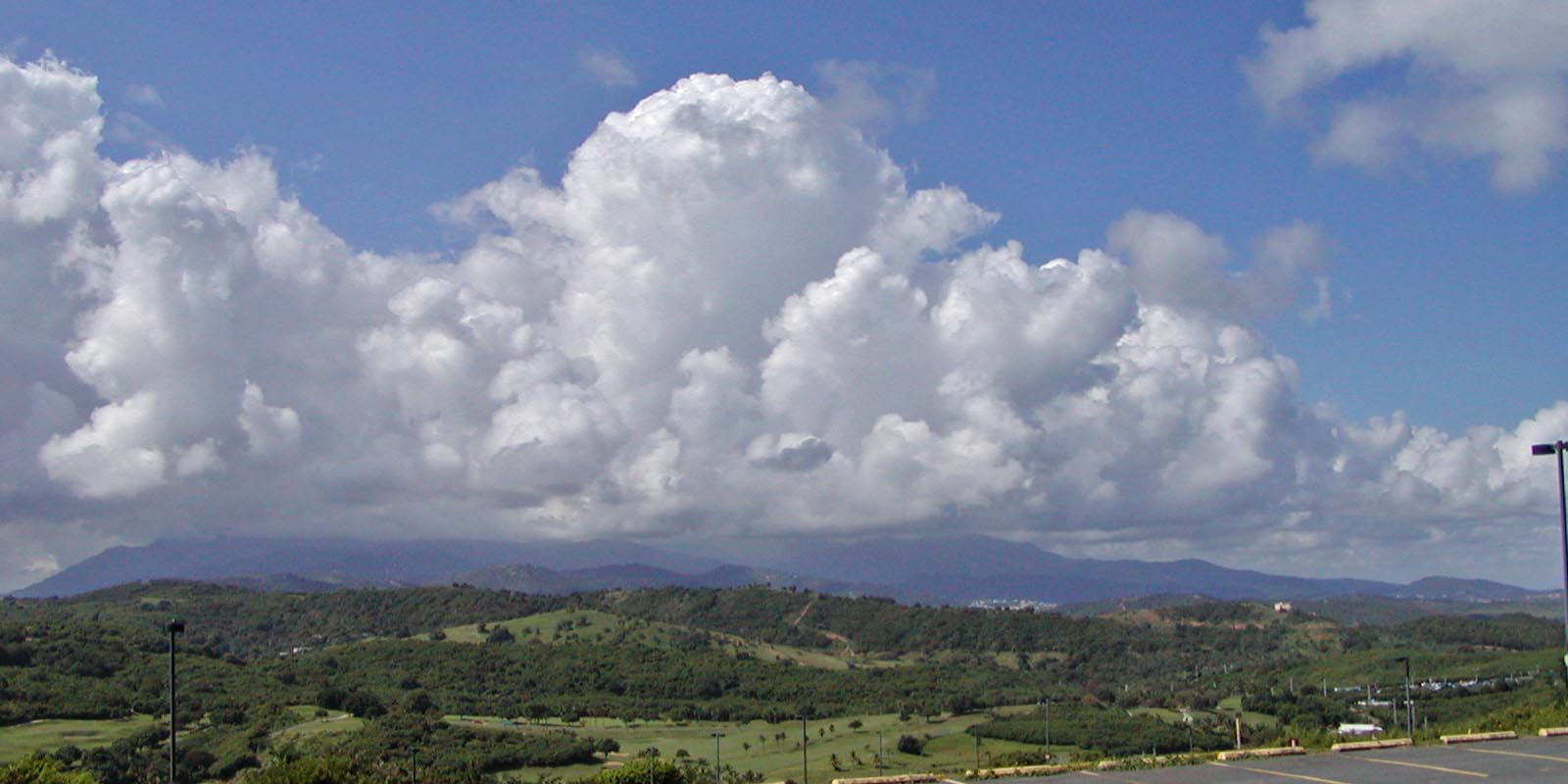
El Yunque National Forest in Puerto Rico, the only tropical rainforest managed by the U.S. National Forest Service

A jungle is an area of land covered with dense forest and tangled vegetation, usually in tropical climates. Application of the term has varied greatly during the past century. Because jungles occur on all inhabited landmasses and may incorporate numerous vegetation and land types in different climatic zones, the wildlife of jungles cannot be straightforwardly defined.

== Etymology ==
The word jungle originates from the Sanskrit word jaṅgala (जङ्गल), meaning rough and arid. It came into the English language in the 18th century via the Hindustani word for forest (Hindi/Urdu: जंगल/جنگل) (jaṅgal). Jaṅgala has also been variously transcribed in English as jangal, jangla, jungal, and jungala. It has been suggested that an Anglo-Indian interpretation led to its connotation as a dense "tangled thicket". The term is prevalent in many languages of the Indian subcontinent, and the Iranian Plateau, where it is commonly used to refer to the plant growth replacing primeval forest or to the unkempt tropical vegetation that takes over abandoned areas.

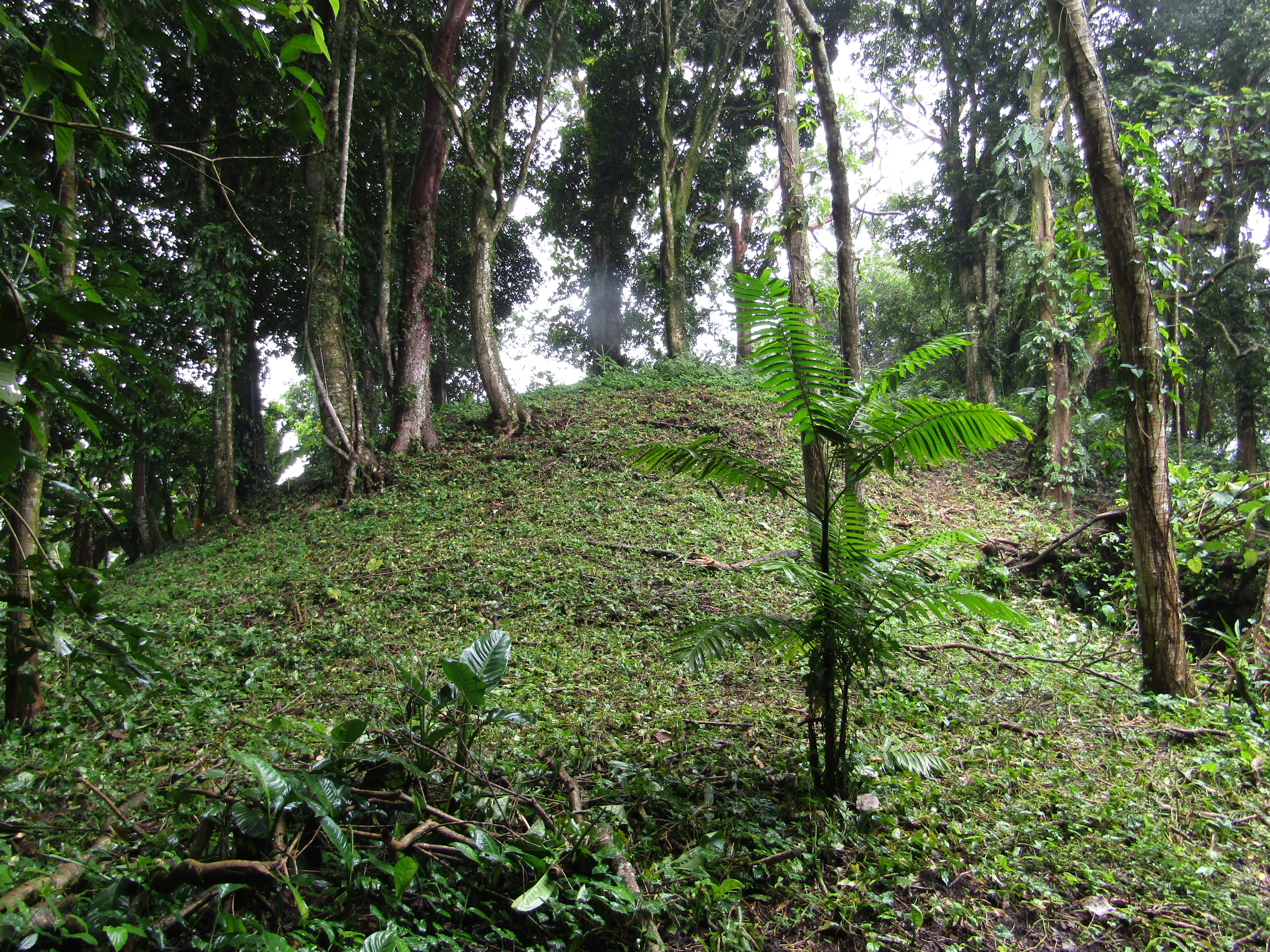
Mound from Los Naranjos archeological site in Honduras

== Varying usage ==
=== As dense and tangled vegetation ===
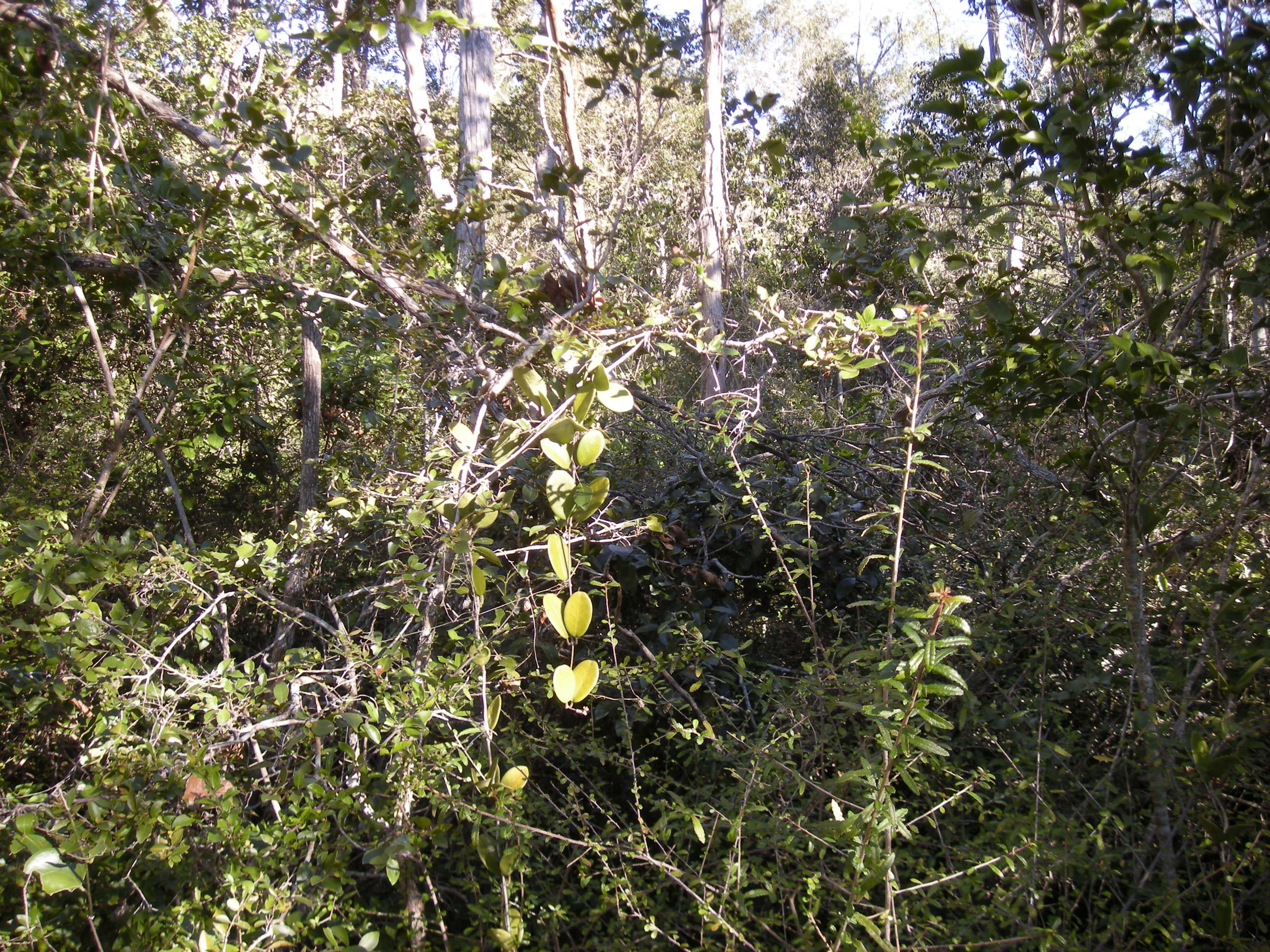
Vine thicket, a typical tangled jungle, Australia

One of the most common meanings of jungle is land overgrown with tangled vegetation at ground level, especially in the tropics. Typically such vegetation is sufficiently dense to hinder movement by humans, requiring that travellers cut their way through. This definition draws a distinction between a rainforest and a jungle, since the understorey of rainforests is typically open of vegetation due to a lack of sunlight, and hence relatively easy to traverse. Jungles may exist within, or at the borders of, tropical forests in areas where the woodland has been opened through natural disturbance such as hurricanes, or through human activity such as logging. The successional vegetation that springs up following such disturbance, is dense and tangled and is a "typical" jungle. Jungle also typically forms along rainforest margins such as stream banks, once again due to the greater available light at ground level.

Monsoon forests and mangroves are commonly referred to as jungles of this type. Having a more open canopy than rainforests, monsoon forests typically have dense understoreys with numerous lianas and shrubs making movement difficult, while the prop roots and low canopies of mangroves produce similar difficulties.

=== As moist forest ===
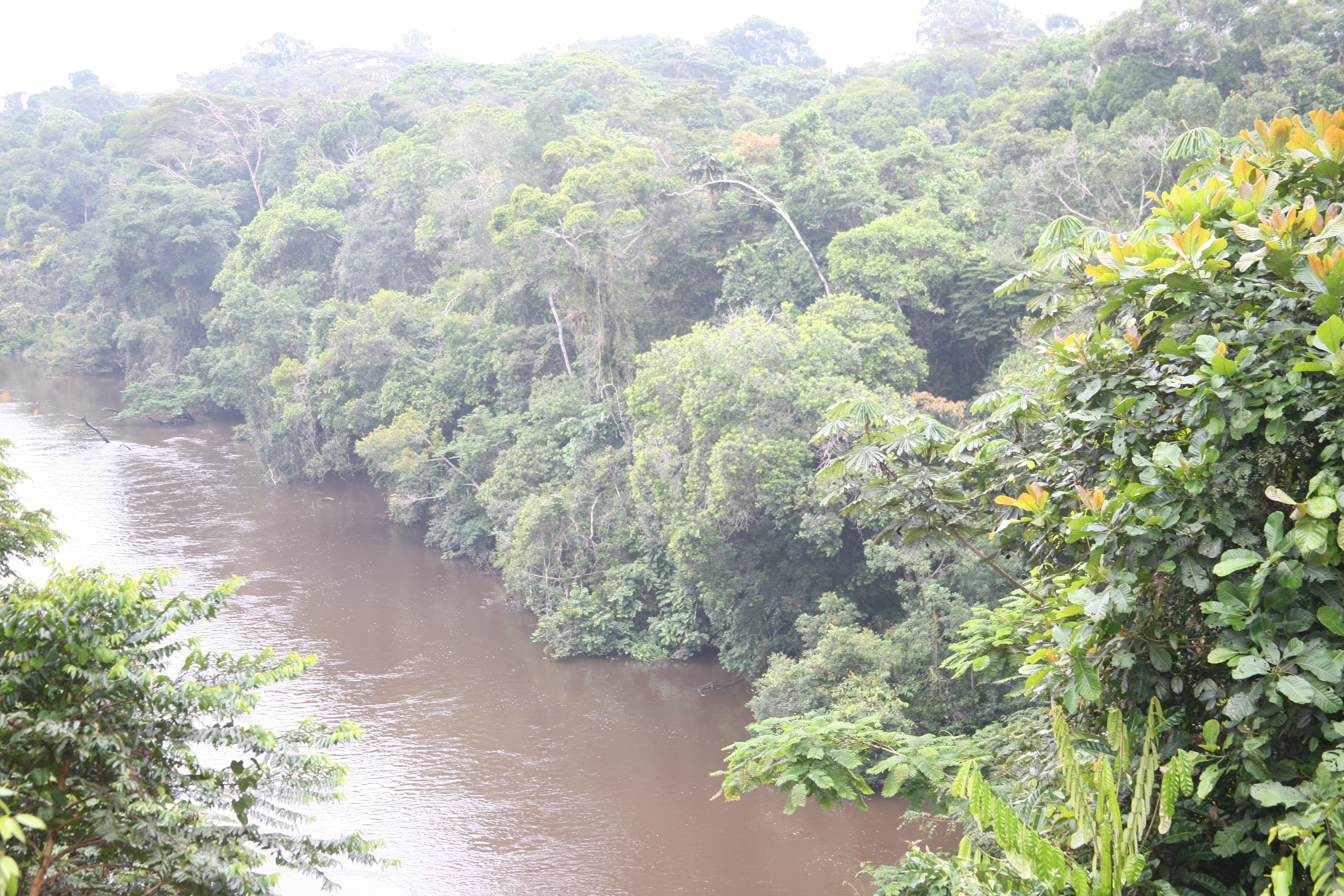
Jungle lining a river bank in rainforest, Cameroon

Because European explorers initially travelled through tropical forests largely by river, the dense tangled vegetation lining the stream banks gave a misleading impression that such jungle conditions existed throughout the entire forest. As a result, it was wrongly assumed that the entire forest was impenetrable jungle. This in turn appears to have given rise to the second popular usage of jungle as virtually any humid tropical forest. Jungle in this context is particularly associated with tropical rain forest, but may extend to cloud forest, temperate rainforest, and mangroves with no reference to the vegetation structure or the ease of travel.

The terms "tropical forest" and "rainforest" have largely replaced "jungle" as the descriptor of humid tropical forests, a linguistic transition that has occurred since the 1970s. "Rainforest" itself did not appear in English dictionaries prior to the 1970s. The word "jungle" accounted for over 80% of the terms used to refer to tropical forests in print media prior to the 1970s; since then it has been steadily replaced by "rainforest", although "jungle" still remains in common use when referring to tropical rainforests.

=== As metaphor ===
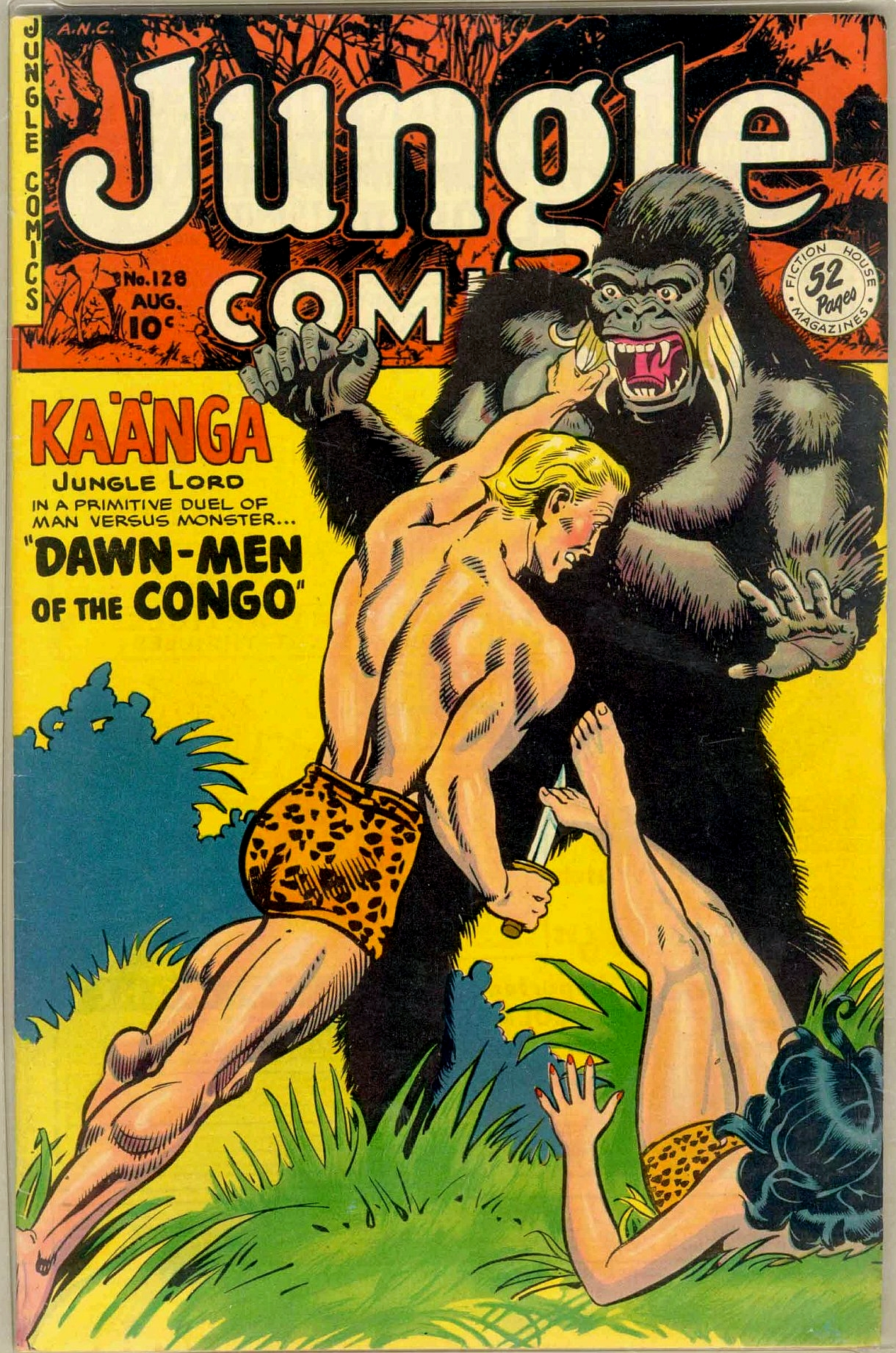
Use of the term jungle to represent savageness and ferocity in popular culture

As a metaphor, jungle often refers to situations that are unruly or lawless, or where the only law is perceived to be "survival of the fittest". This reflects the view of "city people" that forests are such places. Upton Sinclair gave the title The Jungle (1906) to his famous book about the life of workers at the Chicago Stockyards, portraying the workers as being mercilessly exploited with no legal or other lawful recourse.

The term "The Law of the Jungle" is also used in a similar context, drawn from Rudyard Kipling's The Jungle Book (1894)—though in the society of jungle animals portrayed in that book and obviously meant as a metaphor for human society, that phrase referred to an intricate code of laws which Kipling describes in detail, and not at all to a lawless chaos.

The word "jungle" carries connotations of untamed and uncontrollable nature and isolation from civilisation, along with the emotions that evokes: threat, confusion, powerlessness, disorientation and immobilisation. The change from "jungle" to "rainforest" as the preferred term for describing tropical forests has been a response to an increasing perception of these forests as fragile and spiritual places, a viewpoint not in keeping with the darker connotations of "jungle".

Cultural scholars, especially post-colonial critics, often analyse the jungle within the concept of hierarchical domination and the demand western cultures often places on other cultures to conform to their standards of civilisation. For example: Edward Said notes that the Tarzan depicted by Johnny Weissmuller was a resident of the jungle representing the savage, untamed and wild, yet still a white master of it; and in his essay "An Image of Africa" about Heart of Darkness Nigerian novelist and theorist Chinua Achebe notes how the jungle and Africa become the source of temptation for white European characters like Marlowe and Kurtz.

Former Israeli Prime Minister Ehud Barak compared Israel to "a villa in the jungle", a comparison which had been often quoted in Israeli political debates. Barak's critics on the left side of Israeli politics strongly criticised the comparison.

== See also ==
- Monsoon forest
- Arid Forest Research Institute (AFRI)
- Rainforest
- Wilderness
- Grove (nature)
- Amazon rainforest
