= Chipata Mountain =

Mountain in Malawi

- Location within Malawi

Highest point
- Elevation: 1,614 m (5,295 ft)
- Coordinates: 13.067284°S 33.931939°E

Geography
- Location: Malawi

Chipata Mountain is a mountain in central Malawi. It is located in Nkhotakota District, north of the town of Mbobo.

Chipata Mountain is in Nkhotakota Wildlife Reserve, and is the reserve's tallest peak. It is located at the park's western edge. The wildlife refuge lies on the western edge of the East African Rift, and Chipata Mountain is part of a north-south belt of hills, mountains, and escarpments that form the western boundary of the rift. To the east is a plain that borders on Lake Malawi. To the west is the Central Region Plateau, also known as the Lilongwe Plain.

Miombo woodland is the predominant vegetation on the mountain. The top of the mountain is home to a small patch (44 hectares) of mid-altitude montane rainforest, the only montane rainforest between the Viphya Mountains to the north, and Ntchisi Mountain further south.

Chipata Camp a visitor-serving campground on the mountain's southeastern slope.
