= Mylothris mavunda =

Scientific classification
- Kingdom: Animalia
- Phylum: Arthropoda
- Clade: Pancrustacea
- Class: Insecta
- Order: Lepidoptera
- Family: Pieridae
- Genus: Mylothris
- Species: M. mavunda

Binomial name
- Mylothris mavunda Hancock & Heath, 1985

Species of butterfly

Mylothris mavunda is a butterfly in the family Pieridae. It is found in north-western Zambia. The habitat consists of Cryptosepalum forests.

Adults have been recorded on wing in March, April, May, November and December.
