= Central Zambezian miombo woodlands =

Ecoregion in Africa

Coordinates: 8.8°S 30.26°E

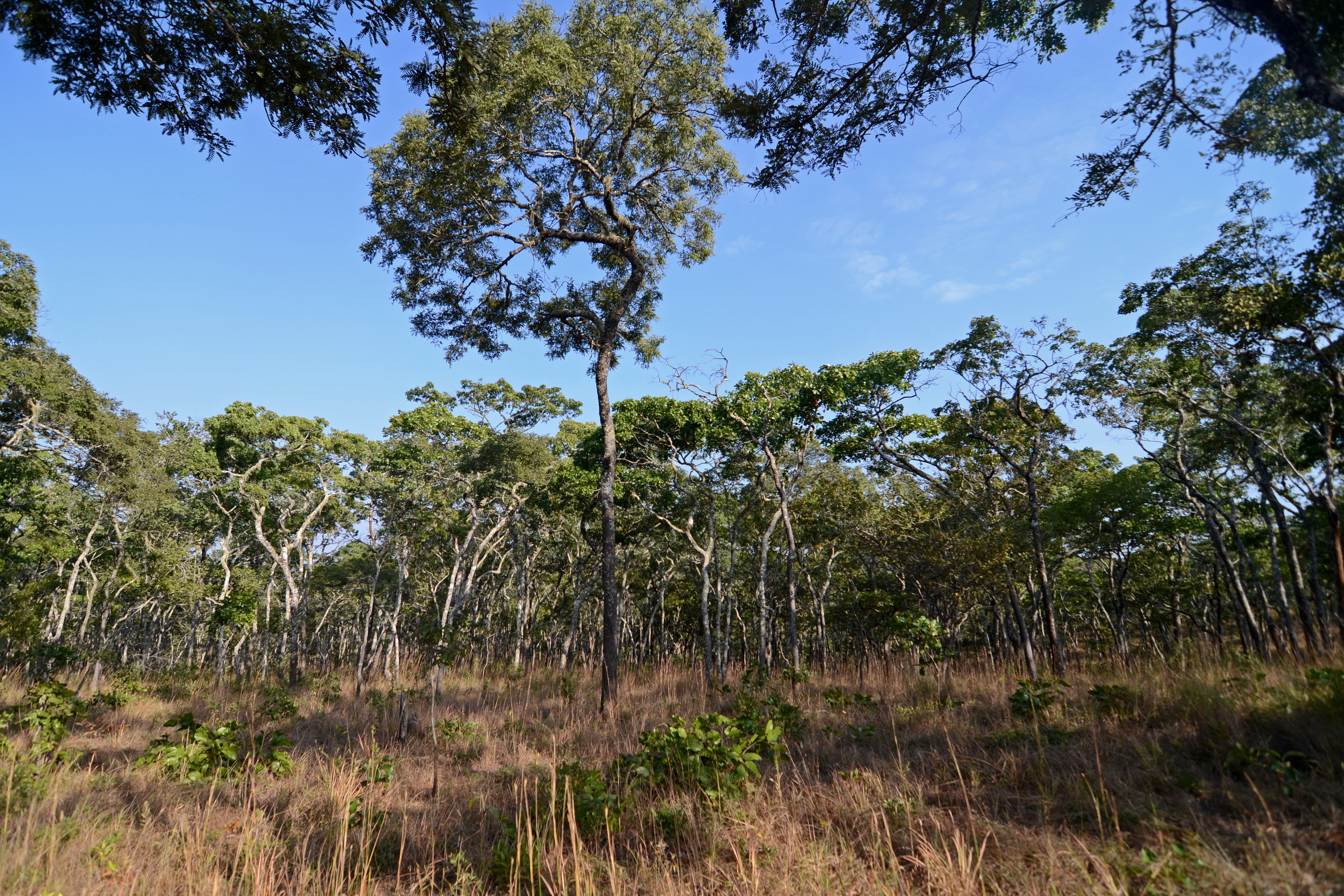
- Miombo woodland in Nkhotakota Wildlife Reserve, Malawi

- Distribution of the Central Zambezian miombo woodlands

Ecology
- Realm: Afrotropical
- Biome: Tropical and subtropical grasslands, savannas, and shrublands
- Borders: List: Albertine Rift montane forests; Angolan miombo woodlands; Eastern miombo woodlands; Itigi–Sumbu thicket; Southern Acacia–Commiphora bushlands and thickets; Southern Congolian forest–savanna mosaic; Southern miombo woodlands; Victoria Basin forest–savanna mosaic; Western Zambezian grasslands; Zambezian Baikiaea woodlands; Zambezian Cryptosepalum dry forests; Zambezian flooded grasslands; Zambezian and mopane woodlands

Geography
- Area: 1,184,200 km^{2} (457,200 mi^{2})
- Countries: List: Angola; Burundi; Democratic Republic of the Congo; Malawi; Tanzania; Zambia

Conservation
- Conservation status: vulnerable
- Global 200: yes
- Protected: 26.5%

The Central Zambezian miombo woodlands ecoregion spans southern central Africa. Miombo woodland is the predominant plant community. It is one of the largest ecoregions on the continent, and home to a great variety of wildlife, including many large mammals.

== Location and description ==
The region covers a large area stretching northeast from Angola, including the southeast section of the Democratic Republic of the Congo, the northern half of Zambia, a large section of western Tanzania, southern Burundi, and northern and western Malawi. In the Congo the ecoregion is almost conterminous with Katanga Province. In Zambia it covers the northern half of the country above Lusaka, including the eastern and western "ears" and the Copperbelt. In Tanzania it covers the western inland provinces between Lake Victoria, Lake Tanganyika and Lake Malawi.

The area is mostly flat plateau, and the soils are poor. There is a tropical climate with a long dry season, up to seven months, which leaves the forest vulnerable to fires, and a rainy season from November to March. The woodland is interspersed with riverside dambos (grassy wetlands), which may constitute up to thirty percent of the region.

== Flora ==
The woodlands contain much typical miombo flora of high trees with shrub and grassland underneath, but has much other plant life too. There are typically more evergreen trees than in most miombo woodlands. The classic miombo trees Brachystegia, Julbernardia, and Isoberlinia dominate the woodlands with other tree species such as Pterocarpus angolensis, Albizia sp. and Afzelia quanzensis. Under the trees lie important areas of plants such as the herbaceous Crotalaria and Indigofera.

== Fauna ==
The fauna is diverse. The grasses, shrubs and trees sustain many large mammals including black rhino, Cape buffalo, African elephants, and antelopes such as elands, sable antelope, roan antelope, Lichtenstein's hartebeest, and sitatunga. Large carnivores include lion (Panthera leo), leopard (Panthera pardus), cheetah (Acinonyx jubatus), spotted hyena (Crocuta crocuta), striped hyena (Hyaena hyaena), African wild dog (Lycaon pictus) and side-striped jackal (Canis adustus). There are also many primates in the woodlands, particularly in Uganda and the Democratic Republic of the Congo, including yellow baboon and chimpanzee. The Gombe Stream National Park chimpanzee reserve is in this ecoregion. The only endemic mammals are Monard's dormouse (Graphiurus monardi), Rosevear's lemniscomys (Lemniscomys roseveari), Ansell's shrew (Crocidura ansellorum) and Upemba shrew (Crocidura zimmeri).

The woodlands are also home to many reptiles and birds. There are two endemic bird species, both found in the area of the ecoregion within the Democratic Republic of the Congo: the Lake Lufira weaver (Ploceus ruweti) and the black-lored waxbill (Estrilda nigriloris).

There are nineteen endemic reptiles and thirteen endemic amphibians; a particularly rich area for these is Upemba National Park.

== Urban areas and settlements ==
Although the ecoregion does include large areas of wilderness and national parkland, there are also areas with quite heavy population densities, particularly in Malawi and Burundi and in densely populated urban areas such as Lusaka in Zambia, around which the forest has been largely cleared for planting, firewood and charcoal production. Most of Zambia north of Lusaka is in this ecoregion, including the Copperbelt cities of Ndola, Kitwe, Chingola, location of the huge Nchanga Mines, Luanshya, and the Central Province former mining town of Kabwe (Broken Hill). In Congo, Katanga has a copper and cobalt mining industry, and there is a railway line north through the province from the capital Lubumbashi. In Tanzania the Lake Tanganyika port of Kigoma is the starting point for a visit to Gombe Stream National Park.

== Threats and preservation ==
Threats to the area include bushmeat hunting, in particular the poaching of elephant and rhino. Fire is damaging throughout the region and where there are human populations fire is more common, including the burning of woodland to create agricultural land or for charcoal, for example in Central Zambia. In the highly urbanised Copperbelt areas of Zambia and the Congo the forest has been extensively cleared for charcoal and farming, and waterways polluted by the mining industry, while the civil war in the Congo has led to considerable damage to the environment there.

== Protected areas ==
26.5% of the ecoregion is in protected areas. These include large areas of national park, game reserve, and other protected areas.

=== Angola ===
- Cameia National Park

=== Burundi ===
- Bururi Forest Nature Reserve
- Kigwena Forest Nature Reserve
- Ruvubu National Park

=== Democratic Republic of the Congo ===
- Kundelungu National Park
- Lake Tshangalele Nature Reserve
- Lufira Biosphere Reserve
- Upemba National Park

=== Malawi ===
- Nyika National Park
- Kasungu National Park
- Nkhotakota Wildlife Reserve
- Vwaza Marsh Wildlife Reserve

=== Tanzania ===
- Gombe Stream National Park
- Katavi National Park
- Mahale Mountains National Park
- Ruaha National Park
- Rubondo Island National Park

=== Zambia ===
- Kafue National Park in western Zambia,
- Isangano National Park, Lavushi Manda National Park, and privately-managed Kasanka National Park in central Zambia
- Chembe Bird Sanctuary in the Copperbelt
- Mweru Wantipa National Park, Lusenga Plain National Park, and Nsumbu National Park in northern Zambia.
- Nyika National Park
- North Luangwa National Park
- South Luangwa National Park
- West Lunga National Park

== See also ==
- Ecoregions of Zambia
