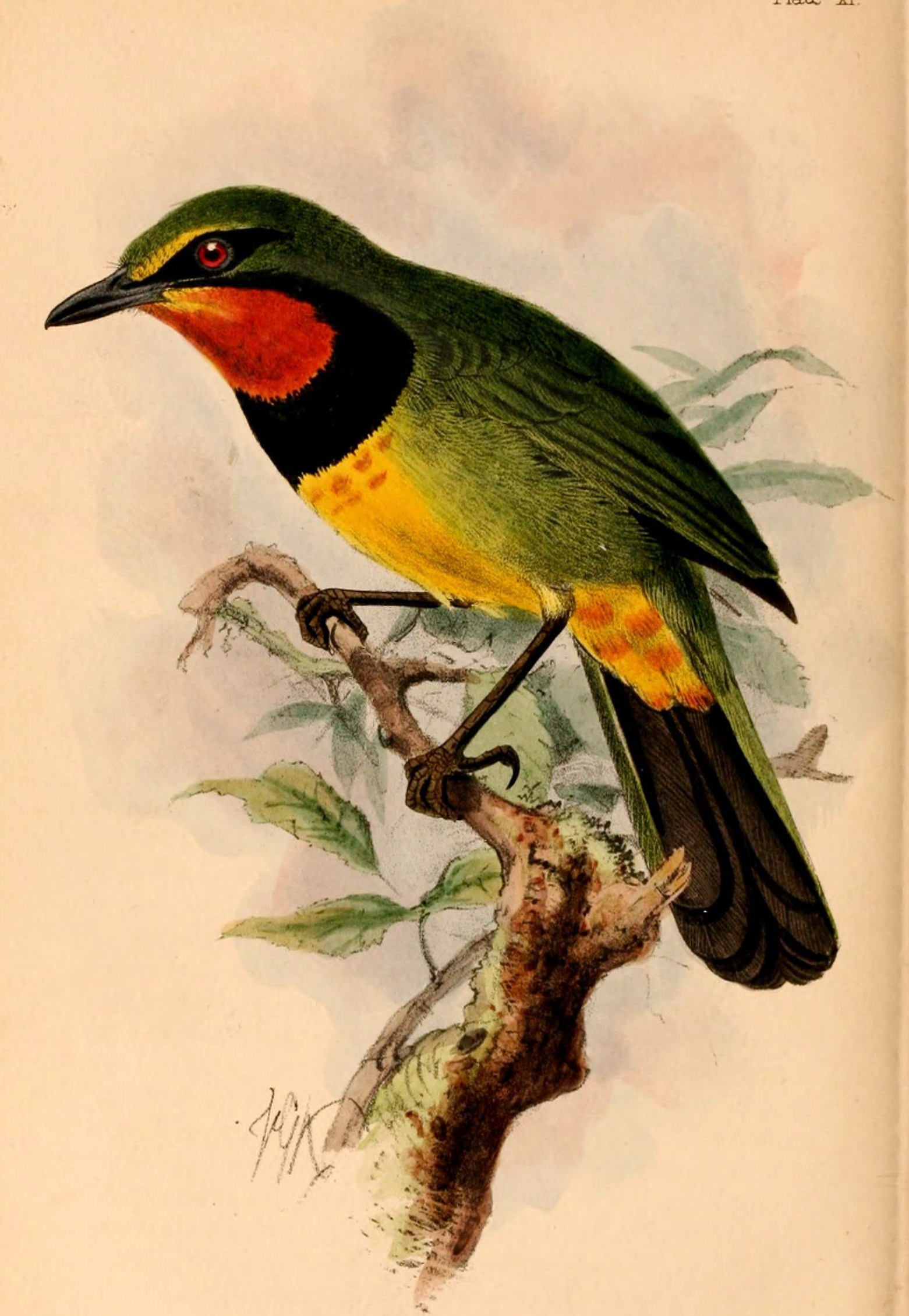

Conservation status
- Least Concern (IUCN 3.1)

Scientific classification
- Kingdom: Animalia
- Phylum: Chordata
- Class: Aves
- Order: Passeriformes
- Family: Malaconotidae
- Genus: Telophorus
- Species: T. viridis

Binomial name
- Telophorus viridis (Vieillot, 1817)

Synonyms
- Telophorus quadricolor

= Gorgeous bushshrike =

Species of bird

The gorgeous bushshrike (Telophorus viridis) is a species of bird in the family Malaconotidae. It is also known as Perrin's or the four-coloured bushshrike. Some use the name gorgeous bushshrike for the subspecies Telophorus viridis viridis only.

== Taxonomy ==
Most authorities consider Telophorus viridis to comprise four subspecies: T. v. viridis, T. v. nigricauda, T. v. quartus and T. v. quadricolor.

== Behavior ==
Gorgeous bush-shrikes are rarely seen despite being a commonly occurring species, as they mostly dwell in densely vegetated woodlands. They are primarily insectivorous, gleaning insects from the understory growth they inhabit.

== Distribution ==
Found in Angola, Republic of the Congo, Democratic Republic of the Congo, Gabon, and Zambia (T. v. viridis), coastal Kenya and Tanzania (T. v. nigricauda), Malawi, Mozambique and Zimbabwe (T. v. quartus) and South Africa and Eswatini (T. v. quadricolor).

== Gallery ==
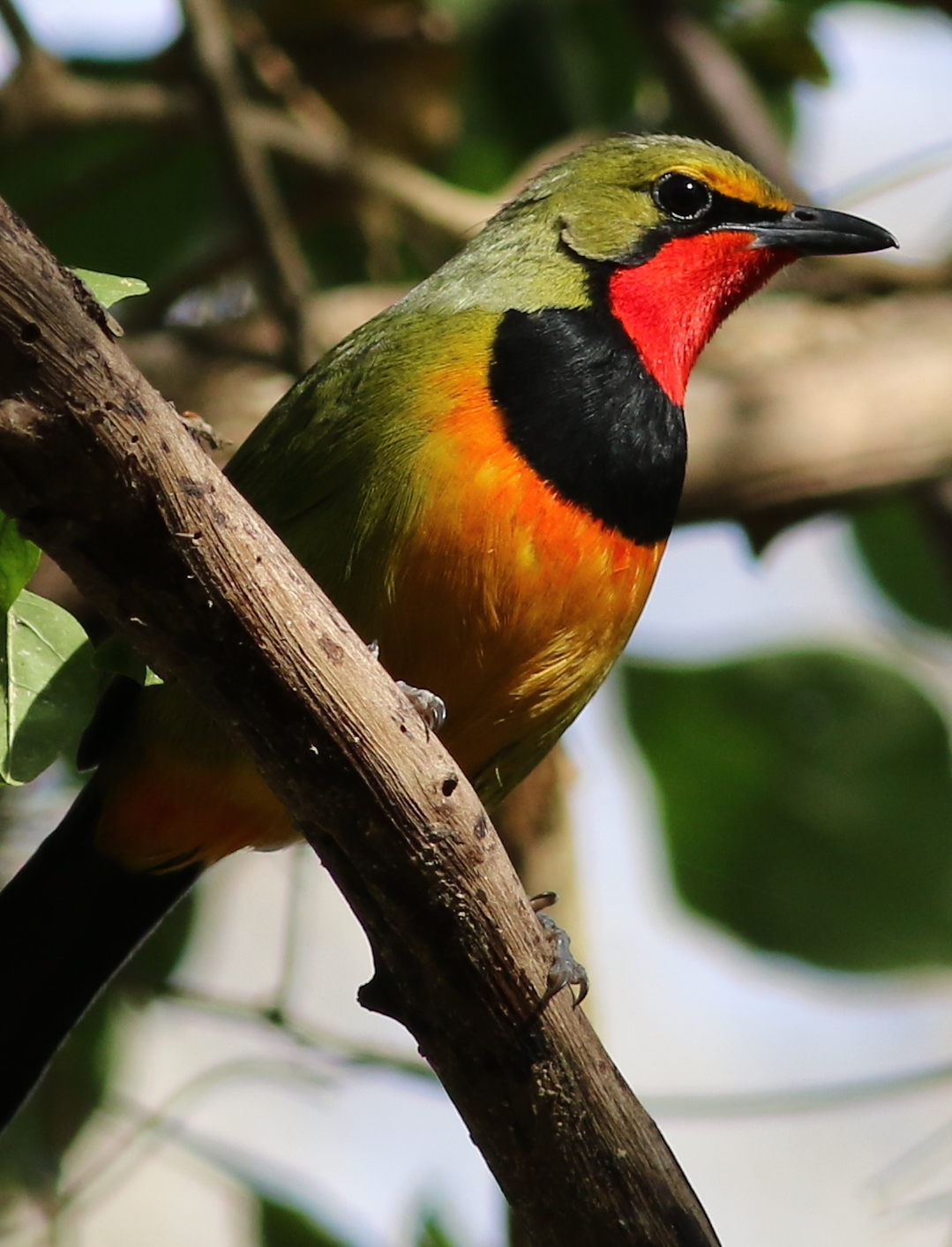
Male at Ndumo Nature Reserve, KwaZulu-Natal

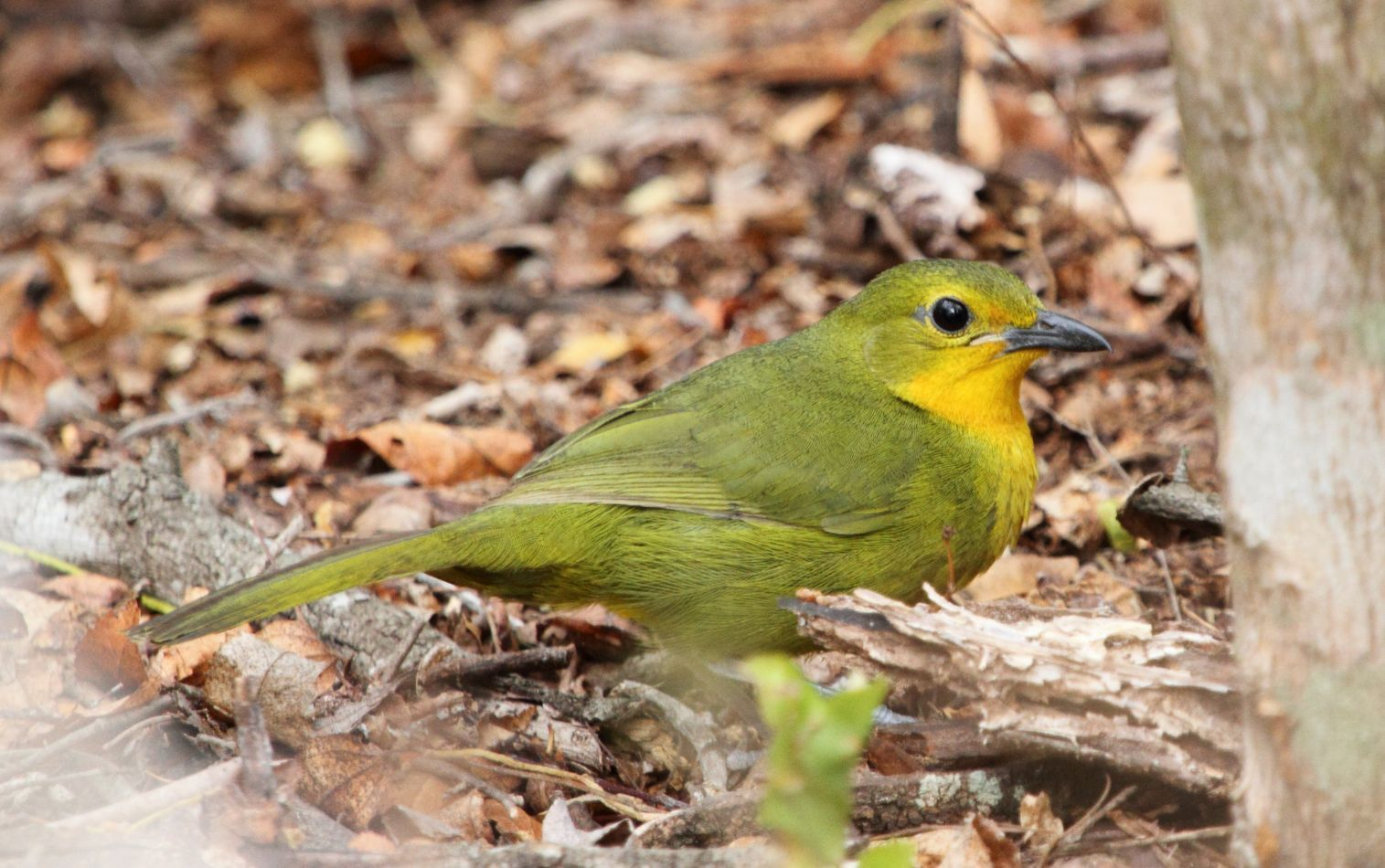
Immature at Mkhuze Game Reserve, KwaZulu-Natal
