= Cryptosepalum minutifolium =

Scientific classification
- Kingdom: Plantae
- Clade: Embryophytes
- Clade: Tracheophytes
- Clade: Angiosperms
- Clade: Eudicots
- Clade: Rosids
- Order: Fabales
- Family: Fabaceae
- Genus: Cryptosepalum
- Species: C. minutifolium

Binomial name
- Cryptosepalum minutifolium (A.Chev.) Hutch. & Dalziel

Species of flowering plant

Cryptosepalum minutifolium is a medium to large tree found Liberia and Ivory Coast belonging to the family Fabaceae, it is not a well known or common tree species.

== Description ==
A medium to large tree capable of reaching 30 m (98 ft) in height. Leaves are bifoliate with small opposite leaflets that can reach up to 2 cm (0.79 in) long and 1 cm (0.39 in) wide and having with fine hairs. The species has a single petal held by a short pedicel, its fruit is a small elliptical, woody and glabrous pod, up to 6 cm (2.4 in) long and rounded at the edges.

== Distribution ==
Occurs in Liberia and Ivory Coast, found in montane forest regions.
