= Telophorus viridis viridis =

Gorgeous bushshrike

Scientific classification
- Kingdom: Animalia
- Phylum: Chordata
- Class: Aves
- Order: Passeriformes
- Family: Malaconotidae
- Genus: Telophorus
- Species: T. viridis
- Subspecies: T. v. viridis

Trinomial name
- Telophorus viridis viridis (Vieillot, 1817)

Synonyms
- Telophorus viridis

Subspecies of bird

Telophorus viridis viridis is a subspecies of the gorgeous bushshrike, from which it differs by a lack of yellow abdominal and orange-rumped plumage.

It is found in Angola, southern Gabon, Congo and DRC and western Zambia. Its natural habitats are tropical forests and tropical moist shrubland. Many authorities consider this to be the nominate subspecies of the four-colored bushshrike. Others consider both to be distinct species, in which case this species takes on the scientific name Telophorus viridis, having been distinguished first.
