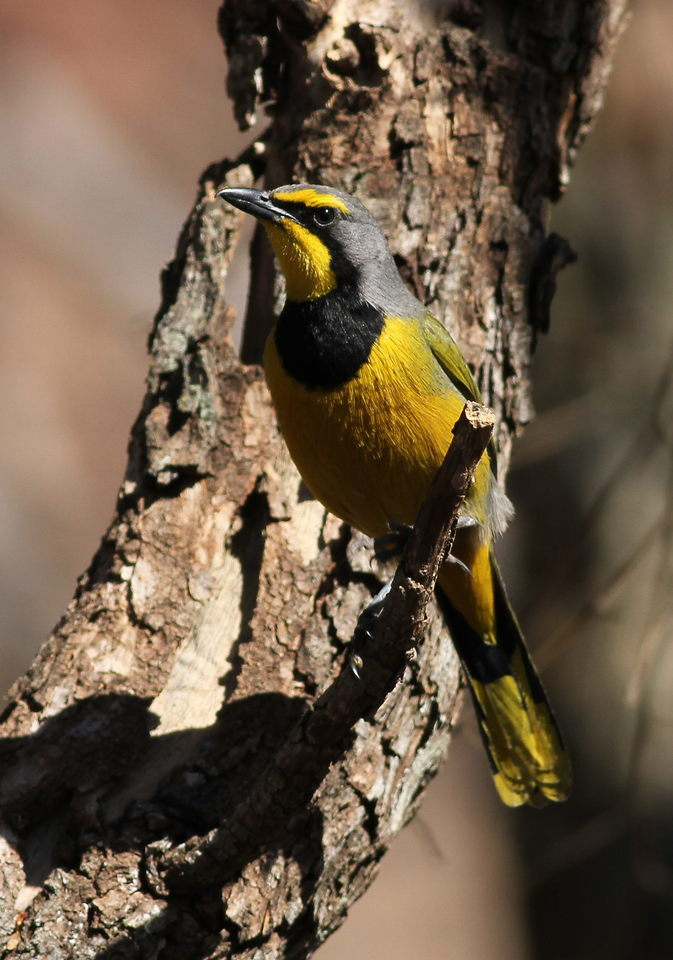

Conservation status
- Least Concern (IUCN 3.1)

Scientific classification
- Kingdom: Animalia
- Phylum: Chordata
- Class: Aves
- Order: Passeriformes
- Family: Malaconotidae
- Genus: Telophorus
- Species: T. zeylonus

Binomial name
- Telophorus zeylonus (Linnaeus, 1766)

Synonyms
- Turdus zeylonus Linnaeus, 1766; Malaconotus zeylonus (Linnaeus, 1766)

= Bokmakierie =

Species of bird

The bokmakierie (Telophorus zeylonus) is a bushshrike. This family of passerine birds is closely related to the true shrikes in the family Laniidae, and was once included in that group. This species is endemic to southern Africa, mainly in South Africa and Namibia, with an isolated population in the mountains of eastern Zimbabwe and western Mozambique.

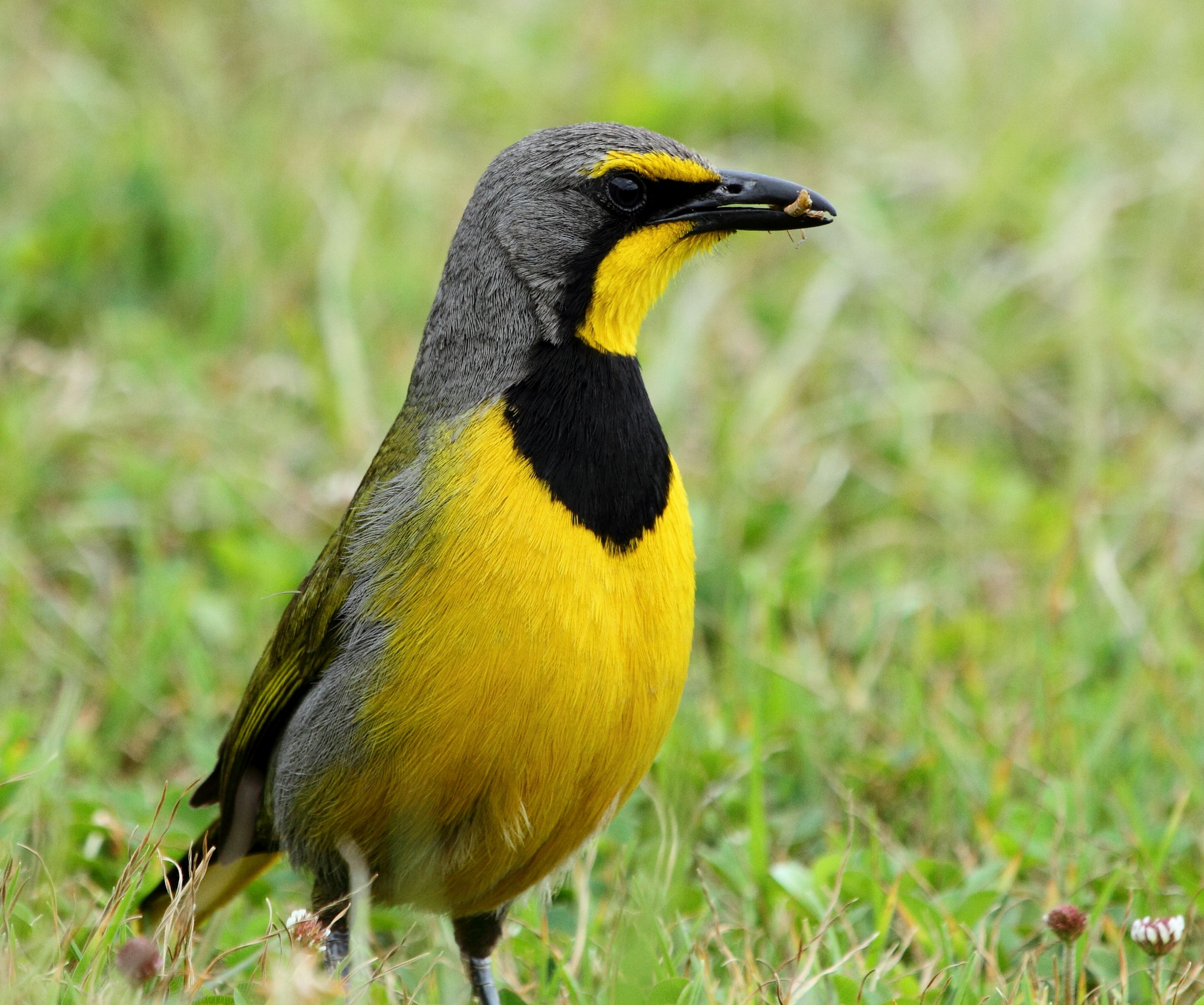
In the southern KwaZulu-Natal Drakensberg

It is a species of open habitats, including karoo scrub, fynbos and parks and gardens in urban areas. The bulky cup nest is constructed in a hedge, scrub or tree fork. The 2–6, usually three, red-brown or lilac-blotched greenish-blue eggs are incubated by both sexes for about 16 days to hatching, with another 18 days to fledging.

The adult bokmakierie is a 22–23 cm long bird with olive-green upperparts and a conspicuous bright yellow tip to the black tail. The head is grey with a yellow supercilium, and the strong bill has a hooked upper mandible. The underparts are bright yellow with a broad black collar between the throat and breast, which continues up the neck sides through the eye to the bill. The legs and feet are blue-grey. The sexes are similar, but juveniles are a dull grey-green below, and lack the black gorget.

There are four subspecies, differing mainly in colour shade and size. Although the species as a whole is not threatened, the isolated dark subspecies restrictus in the Chimanimani Mountains numbers only about 400 birds.

The bokmakierie has a range of loud whistles and calls, often given by a pair in antiphonal duet, but the most typical is the one that gives this species its name, bok-bok-mak-kik. Levaillant called it bacbakiri based on the local name derived from its call. The Dutch settlers called it bokmakierie.

Unlike the true shrikes, which perch conspicuously in the open, the bokmakierie is shy and skulking. This bird has a typical shrike diet of insects, small lizards, snakes, small birds and frogs. It is preyed upon itself by snakes, mongooses, and large shrikes like the northern fiscal and southern boubou.
