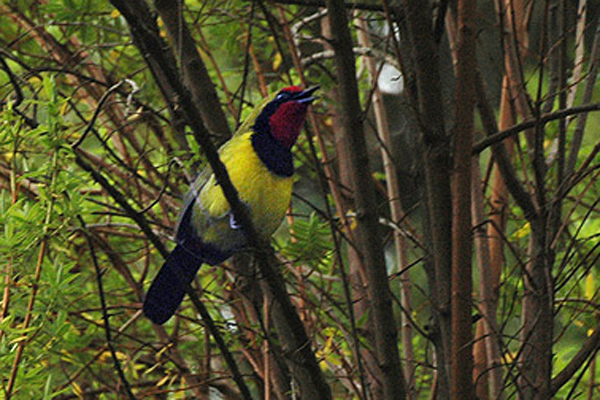

Conservation status
- Least Concern (IUCN 3.1)

Scientific classification
- Kingdom: Animalia
- Phylum: Chordata
- Class: Aves
- Order: Passeriformes
- Family: Malaconotidae
- Genus: Telophorus
- Species: T. dohertyi

Binomial name
- Telophorus dohertyi (Rothschild, 1901)

Synonyms
- Malaconotus dohertyi Chlorophoneus dohertyi

= Doherty's bushshrike =

Species of bird

Doherty's bushshrike (Telophorus dohertyi) is a colourful but skulking species of bush-shrike of the family Malaconotidae which is found in forest habitats in north-central Africa.

The common name and Latin binomial commemorate the American collector William Doherty.

== Description ==
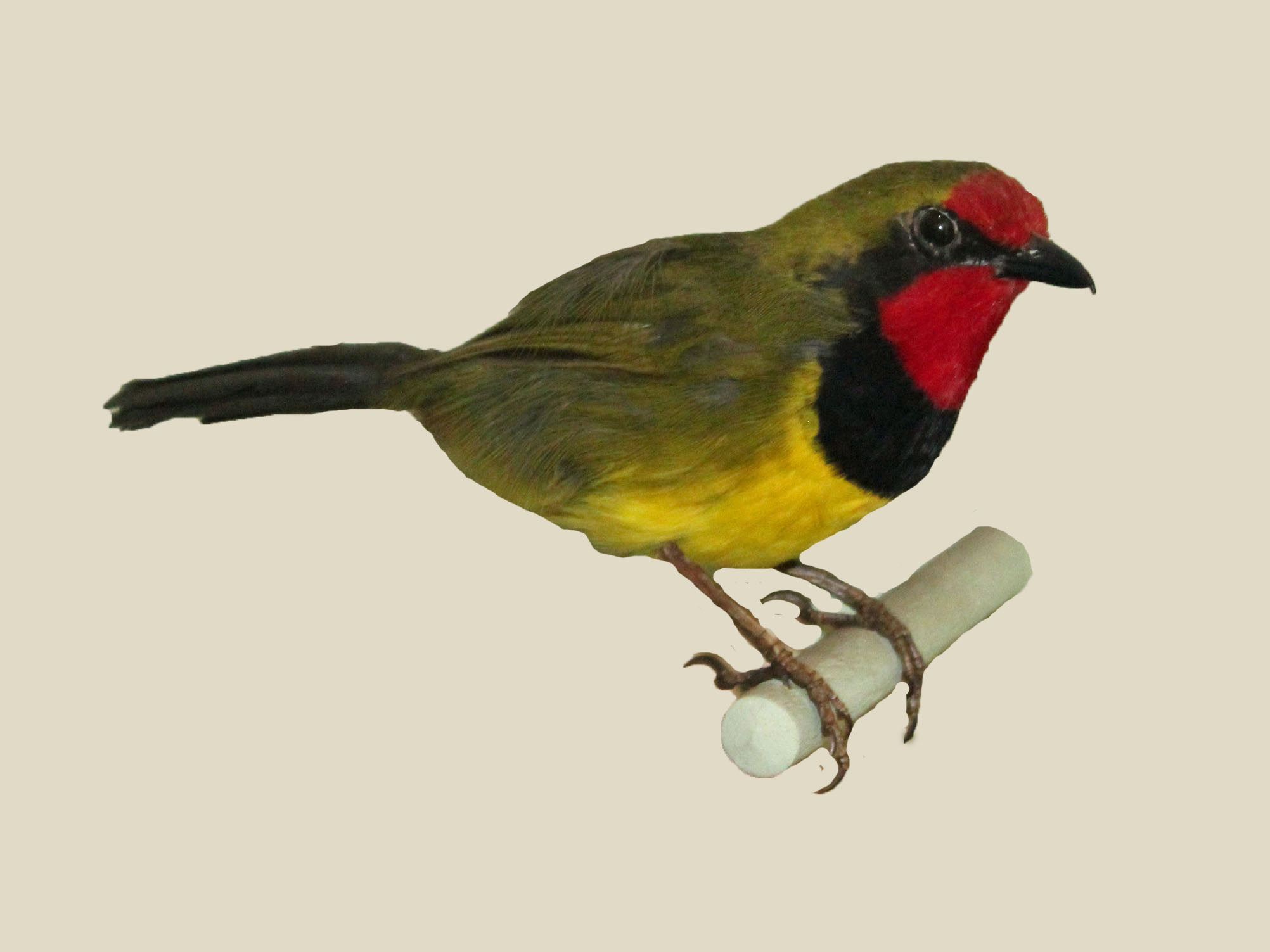
Specimen at Nairobi National Museum

A strikingly coloured, medium-sized bush shrike which in the adults is mostly green with a bright red forehead and throat, a broad black breast band and a bright lemon-yellow belly, the tail is black. Young birds are pale green above with finely barred yellow-green underparts.

== Distribution ==
It is native to the Albertine Rift montane forests and the East African montane forests.

== Habits and habitat ==
Doherty's bush-shrike is a skulking species which is more often heard than it is seen. It is a solitary, skulking species which quietly moves around in dense undergrowth. The loud whistling territorial call is heard in all months of the year. There is a recorded observation of a Doherty's bush-shrike being chased by a black boubou. This species forages by searching dense undergrowth where it gleans from the vegetation and feeds on the ground on arthropods, mainly beetles and grasshoppers. The breeding season is between April and July in the Democratic Republic of the Congo and May and June in Uganda and Kenya. There are records of the barred juveniles being seen from November to March, a record of female on nests being found in Kenya in July and of a juvenile being fed in Rwanda in October. Otherwise its behaviour is little known. It is a highland species generally found between 1,500 and 3,350 metres (4,920 and 10,990 ft) in altitude, the related and similar gorgeous bush-shrike is its lowland equivalent. Its habitat is dense scrub and undergrowth on the edge and in clearings in forest, also in dense secondary growth and humid thickets especially where there is bracken and bamboo mixed in.
