= Cryptosepalum tetraphyllum =

Conservation status
- Vulnerable (IUCN 2.3)

Scientific classification
- Kingdom: Plantae
- Clade: Tracheophytes
- Clade: Angiosperms
- Clade: Eudicots
- Clade: Rosids
- Order: Fabales
- Family: Fabaceae
- Genus: Cryptosepalum
- Species: C. tetraphyllum

Binomial name
- Cryptosepalum tetraphyllum (Hook.f.) Benth.

Species of legume

Cryptosepalum tetraphyllum is a species of plant in the family Fabaceae. It is found in Ivory Coast, Ghana, Guinea, Liberia, and Sierra Leone. It is threatened by habitat loss.

== Description ==
Cryptosepalum tetraphyllum is a medium sized tree that is capable of reaching 30 m tall while its diameter can reach 80 cm but often smaller. Its bark, especially at the base is marked with transverse and longitudinal lines and ridges, but above is generally smooth and greyish in color. The slash is pinkish red while its stems are slender with brown lenticels. The leaves are parippinately compound, stipules and petioles are present but the former falls off early; the leaves generally have two pairs of leaflets, an upper pair and a lower pair. The leaflet above can reach 5 cm long and 2 cm wide while the lower pair is usually shorter; leaflets have a broadly ovate to elliptic shape with both the apex and base rounded for the lower pair of leaflets. Flowers are arranged in axillary racemes, the petal is one and whitish in color besides purple anthers both held by a pedicel that is about 1 cm long.

== Distribution ==
Occurs in West Africa, found in riverine, lowland and montane forest areas.
