= Cryptosepalum diphyllum =

Conservation status
- Endangered (IUCN 2.3)

Scientific classification
- Kingdom: Plantae
- Clade: Tracheophytes
- Clade: Angiosperms
- Clade: Eudicots
- Clade: Rosids
- Order: Fabales
- Family: Fabaceae
- Genus: Cryptosepalum
- Species: C. diphyllum

Binomial name
- Cryptosepalum diphyllum Duvign.

Species of legume

Cryptosepalum diphyllum is a species of legume in the family Fabaceae. It is found only in Nigeria. It is threatened by habitat loss.
