= Zambezian evergreen dry forests =

Ecoregion in Angola and Zambia

Zambezian evergreen dry forests Zambezian cryptosepalum dry forests
- Location of the ecoregion

Ecology
- Realm: Afrotropical
- Biome: tropical and subtropical dry broadleaf forests
- Borders: Angolan miombo woodlands; Central Zambezian miombo woodlands; Western Zambezian grasslands; Zambezian flooded grasslands

Geography
- Area: 38,100 km^{2} (14,700 mi^{2})
- Countries: Angola; Zambia

Conservation
- Protected: 23.21%

The Zambezian evergreen dry forests, also known as the Zambezian Cryptosepalum dry forest, is a tropical dry broadleaf forest ecoregion of Southern Africa. It consists of several areas of thick forest in western Zambia and adjacent Angola. It is one of the largest areas of tropical evergreen forest outside the equatorial zone.

== Location ==
The forest are found on rolling hills of sandy soil drained by the Kabompo River of northern Barotseland in Western Zambia, with one area across the border in Angola.

The Western Zambezian grasslands separate the forest enclaves from one another. The Barotse Floodplain, part of the Zambezian flooded grasslands ecoregion, lies to the southwest. The Central Zambezian miombo woodlands and the Angolan miombo woodlands lie on the better soils to the east and west, respectively.

The ecoregion is at 1100 to 1200 meters elevation. The climate is tropical savanna, with average annual temperature around 21°C.

== Flora ==
The characteristic trees are tall evergreen mavunda trees (Cryptosepalum exfoliatum subsp. pseudotaxus). Other trees include Brachystegia spiciformis, Brachystegia longifolia, Brachystegia floribunda, Colophospermum mopane, Syzygium guineense afromontanum, Bersama abyssinica, Erythrophleum africanum, and Combretum elaeagnoides. There is a dense undergrowth of creepers and shrub thickets, with mosses carpeting the ground in the denser forests.

== Fauna ==
The forests are home to a variety of wildlife including ungulates such yellow-backed duiker, blue duiker and their predators, as well as other species such as bushpigs. The only two endemic species are a mammal Rosevear's striped grass mouse, and a bird white-chested tinkerbird (Pogoniulus makawai). However the latter has not been actually spotted since 1964 and may in fact be a variant of the common and widespread yellow-rumped tinkerbird (Pogoniulus bilineatus).

The forests are particularly rich in birdlife, with nearly 400 species found here, including: the Guttera edouardi kathleenae subspecies of the crested guineafowl, olive long-tailed cuckoo (Cercococcyx olivinus), Ross's turaco (Musophaga rossae), Cabanis's greenbul (Phyllastrephus cabanisi), purple-throated cuckoo-shrike (Campephaga quiscalina), Boulton's batis (Batis margaritae), African crested-flycatcher (Trochocercus cyanomelas), common square-tailed drongo (Dicrurus ludwigii), black-fronted bushshrike (Telophorus nigrifrons), Perrin's bushshrike (T. viridis viridis), olive sunbird (Nectarinia olivacea), forest weaver (Ploceus bicolor) and black-tailed waxbill (Estrilda perreini).

There are many species of reptiles and amphibians typical of tropical and southern Africa although none are endemic to the region.

== Threats and preservation ==
These dry forests stand on infertile sandy soil with little surface water and are therefore uninhabitable and fairly undisturbed, apart from poaching of wildlife.

More research is needed into the flora and fauna of the area.

=== Protected areas ===
23.21% of the ecoregion is in protected areas. They include Kafue and West Lunga national parks, Chibwika Ntambu, Chizera, Lukwakwa, and West Zambezi game management areas, and Chavuma, Kasesi, Mambwe, and Namboma forest reserves.
