= Hopes and Impediments =

1988 essay collection by Chinua Achebe

First edition (publ. Doubleday)

Hopes and Impediments: Selected Essays, 1965–1987 is collection of essays by Chinua Achebe, published in 1988.

Several of the essays caution against generalizing all African people into a monolithic culture, or using Africa as a facile metaphor. The opening essay, "An Image of Africa: Racism in Conrad's Heart of Darkness", challenged the prevailing opinions in the west about Joseph Conrad's depiction of African people. He also discusses several notable authors and shares his opinion on the role of writers and writing in cultures. In a contemporary review, Chris Dunton wrote: "The essays in his new book remind us also how tough-minded, how properly insistent, he can be in exposing false and demeaning ideas about Africa and its culture." The book is dedicated to Professor Michael Thelwell.

== Contents ==
- "An Image of Africa: Racism in Conrad's Heart of Darkness"
- "Impediments to Dialogue Between North and South"
- "Named for Victoria, Queen of England"
- "The Novelist as Teacher"
- "The Writer and His Community"
- "The Igbo World and Its Art"
- "Colonialist Criticism"
- "Thoughts on the African Novel"
- "Work and Play in Tutuola’s The Palm-Wine Drinkard"
- "Don't Let Him Die: A Tribute to Christopher Okigbo"
- "Kofi Awoonor as Novelist"
- "Language and the Destiny of Man"
- "The Truth of Fiction"
- "What Has Literature Got To Do With It?"
- "Postscript: James Baldwin (1924-1987)"
