= Flora Zambesiaca =

Flora Zambesiaca is an ongoing botanical project aimed at achieving a full account of the flowering plants and ferns of the Zambezi River basin covering Zambia, Malawi, Mozambique, Zimbabwe, Botswana and the Caprivi Strip, and is published by the Royal Botanic Gardens, Kew. The work is published in parts or whole volumes as and when the relevant families are completed, and is currently (2012) over the halfway mark. Some 24 500 plant species have been described so far.

The majority of the line illustration plates in the first volume were by Miss L. M. Ripley and Miss G. W. Dalby.

The Flora Zambesiaca project was set in motion in 1950 by Arthur Wallis Exell when he returned to the British Museum from his wartime activities with the Government Communications Headquarters at Bletchley Park - he was co-editor of Flora Zambesiaca from 1962 onwards. The present survey is under the editorship of Jonathan Timberlake who works in the Herbarium at the Royal Botanic Gardens, Kew.

== See also ==
- Zambezian region
