= Nkhotakota Wildlife Reserve =

National park in Malawi

- IUCN category IV (habitat/species management area)
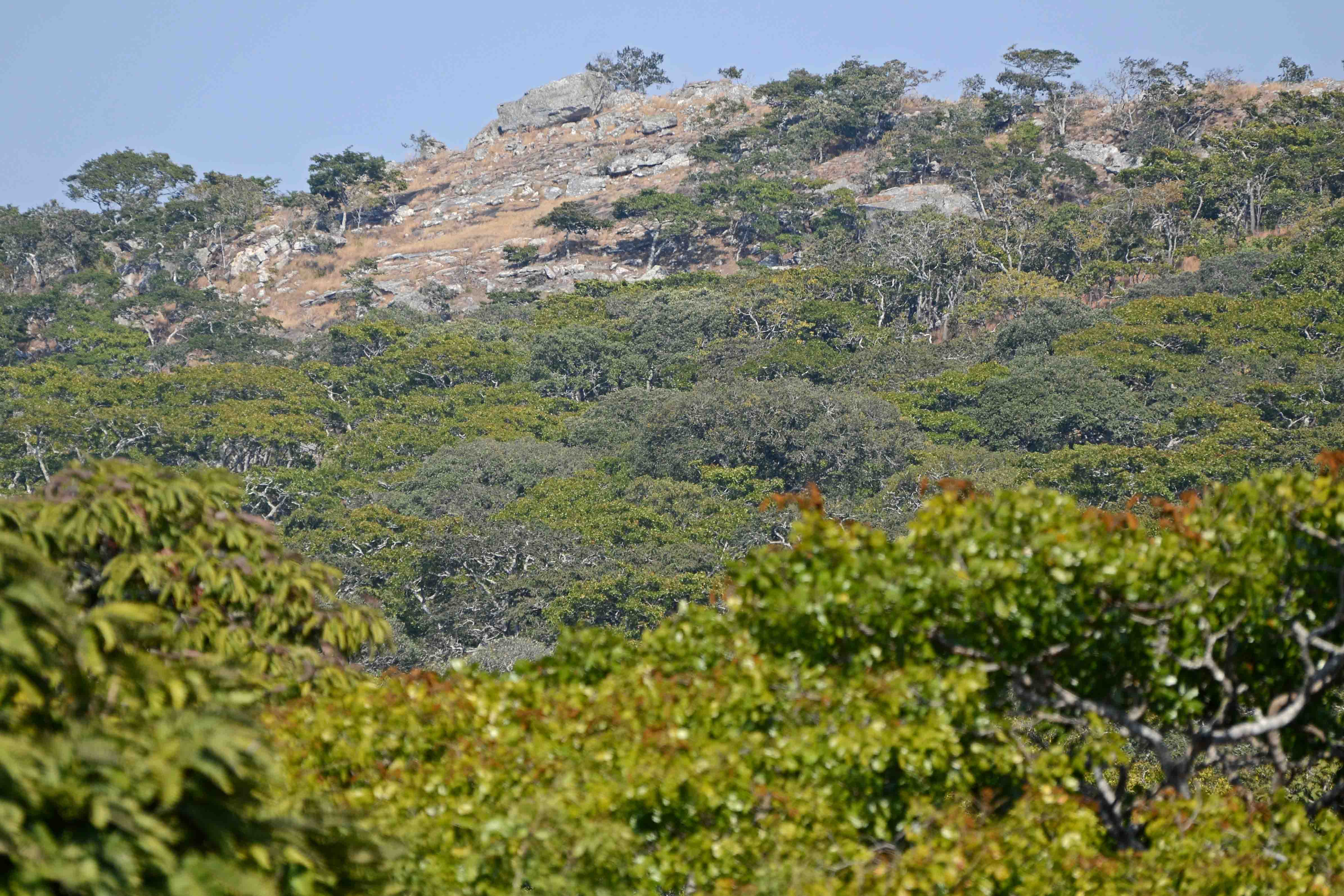
- Terrain of Nkhotakota, 2011

- Location within Malawi
- Location: Malawi
- Nearest town: Nkhotakota
- Coordinates: 12°S 34°E
- Area: 1,800 km^{2} (690 sq mi)

Nkhotakota Wildlife Reserve (also known as Nkhotakota Game Reserve or Nkhotakota Wildlife Preserve), is the largest and oldest wildlife reserve in Malawi, near Nkhotakota. The park's hilly terrain features dambos and miombo woodlands as the dominant vegetation, which support a variety of mammal and bird species. Poaching has greatly reduced the number of elephants and other large mammals in Nkhotakota, but conservation efforts to restore the elephant population started when African Parks began managing the reserve in 2015.

== History ==
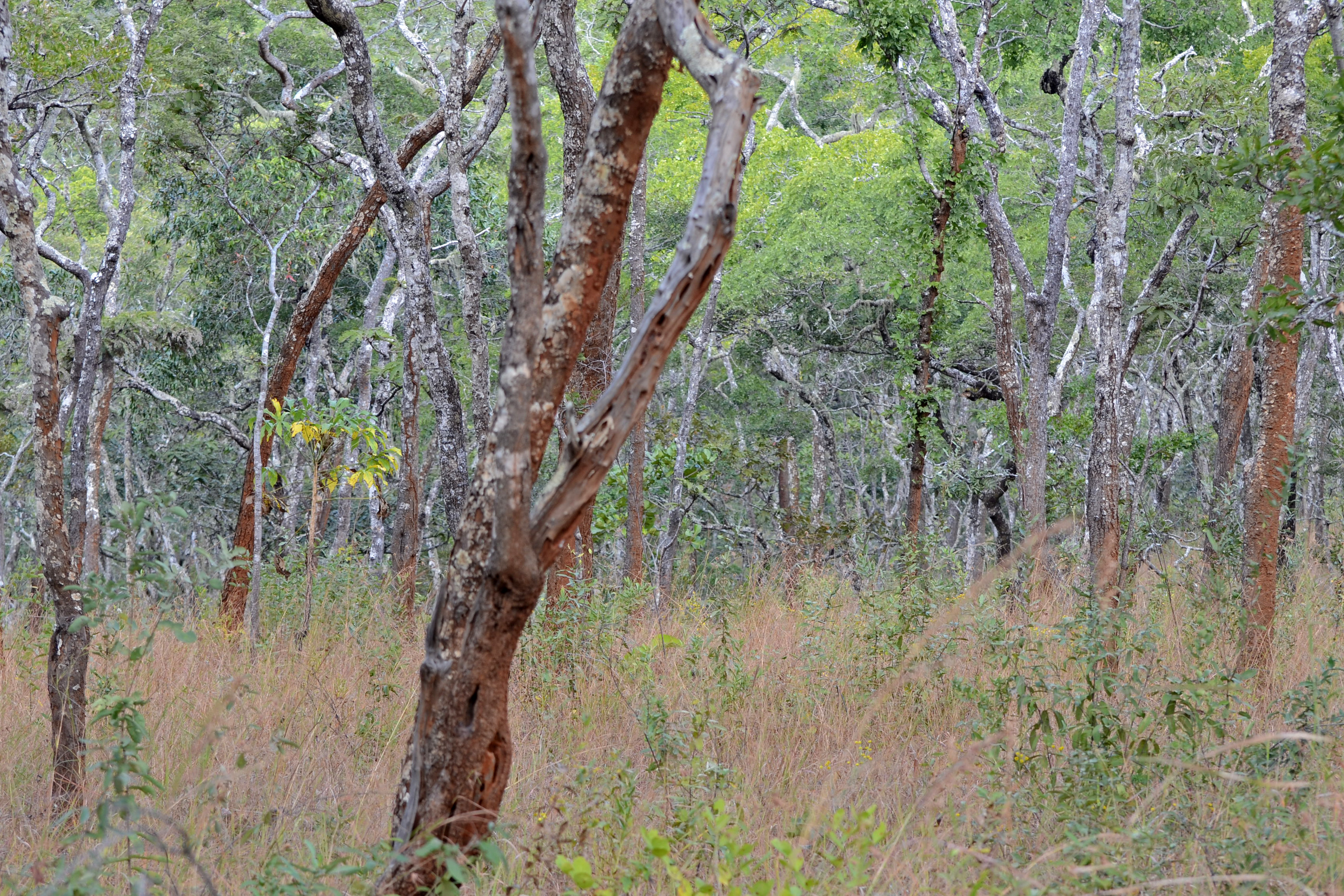
The park's miombo woodlands, 2011

The park has been vulnerable to charcoal burning, logging, and poaching. In 2012, the Global Environmental Facility invested $850,000 through the "Effective Management of the Nkhotakota Wildlife Reserve" project to improve the management of the reserve, with a focus on its Bua watershed area.

The nonprofit organization African Parks started managing the reserve in 2015, and began to make Nkhotakota "ecologically and socially sustainable" by increasing animal populations and reducing poaching by hiring and training rangers. The organization's twenty-year agreement with Malawi's government through the Department of National Parks and Wildlife was administered by the Public Private Partnership Commission.

During 2016–2017, African Parks relocated approximately 500 elephants from Liwonde National Park and Majete Wildlife Reserve to Nkhotakota. The $1.6 million project was funded by Nationale Postcode Loterij and the Wyss Foundation and others. Buffalo, eland, impala, kudu, sable antelope, warthogs, waterbuck, and zebras were also relocated. African Parks had created roads and a fence, to create a sanctuary within the reserve. They "completely overhaul[ed] the law enforcement and anti-poaching efforts" to make the park safer.

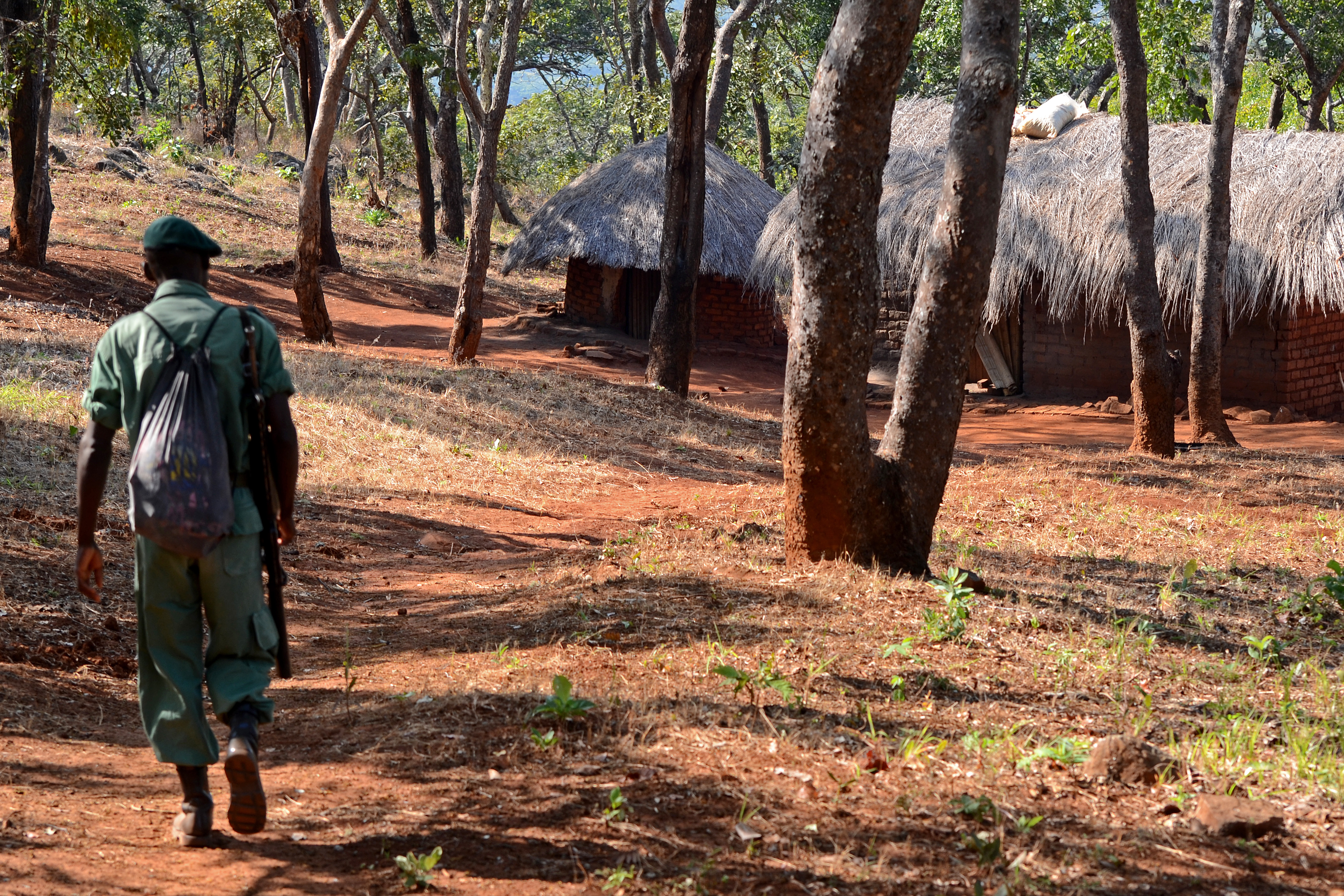
One of the park's guards in 2011

In 2017, African Parks received $65 million from the Wyss Foundation to support management efforts of Nkhotakota and other national parks, including Liwonde, Majete, and Rwanda's Akagera National Park.

== Geography and topography ==
Nkhotakota is an 1,800-square-kilometre (700 square miles), wildlife reserve located near Lake Malawi, in the Great Rift Valley. It borders the Kasungu District, Mzimba District, Nkhotakota, and Ntchisi District.

The reserve extends from the edge of the escarpment above the Great Rift Valley at 1,638 m (5,374 ft), down to the narrow plain beside Lake Malawi at 500 to 600 m (1,640 to 1,970 ft). The terrain is rugged and wild, with the rough slopes and ridges being much dissected by rivers and gorges. The land slopes from west to east, and is carved by three major rivers leading to Lake Malawi.

== Flora and Fauna ==
Nkhotakota features dambos (wetlands) and large areas of miombo woodland with Brachystegia trees and long grasses. There are some dense stands of forest alongside the rivers and a 44 hectares (110 acres) patch of mid-altitude rainforest on Chipata Mountain.

Poaching in recent decades reduced the elephant population from 1,500 to fewer than 100 in 2015. Other large mammals such as the common eland, the waterbuck, the southern reedbuck and the hippopotamus have also declined in numbers. However, after African Parks gained management of the reserve in 2015, more than 520 elephants and 2,000 other animals (including over 100 buffalo) were moved from Liwonde National Park and Majete Wildlife Reserve to Nkhotakota between July 2016 and August 2017, with another 813 animals moved in 2022 (including 15 hippo, a first for African Parks). The park is also home to antelope, baboons, leopards, and warthogs. In 2015, The Maravi Post said that Nkhotakota had the potential to restore locally extinct black rhinoceros, cheetah, lion, and African wild dog populations. In 2019, camera traps recorded the presence of roan antelope and honey badger in the park; both species were thought to be locally extinct. The reserve is the only location in Malawi where the rufous trident bat is found.

Some 280 species of bird have been recorded in the reserve and there are likely to be considerably more than this figure. They vary in size from tiny iridescent kingfishers to large martial eagles. The Taita falcon has been recorded twice near the escarpment and may breed there. Other bird species include the olive-headed weaver, the Böhm's bee-eater, the Arnot's chat, the Anchieta's sunbird, the Böhm's flycatcher, the miombo wren-warbler, the Souza's shrike, the Chapin's apalis, the miombo rock thrush, the miombo scrub robin and the miombo double-collared sunbird.

Since 2005, the protected area is considered a Lion Conservation Unit.

== Tourism ==
British philanthropists and a Malawian opened the Tongole Wilderness Lodge in May 2011, which has contributed to revitalization efforts to restore miombo woodlands, increase animal populations, and expand the size of Nkhotakota's team of 27 rangers to further protect wildlife. The luxury lodge's charity, the Tongole Foundation, supports local communities and schools and, as of 2012, plans to partner with Malawi's Department for National Parks and Wildlife to combat poaching and increase populations of buffalo, kudu, sable, and other wildlife. Bentry Kalanga serves as the lodge's managing director, as of 2013.

The Bua River Lodge, a tented camp overlooking the Bua River near the eastern boundary of the reserve, was established by British expatriate and soil conservationist John Dickinson in 2010. It offers modest accommodations, wildlife viewing, and other activities, as well as day trips to Chipata Mountain, which has a campsite frequented by self-navigating tourists.
