= Rosevear's striped grass mouse =

Conservation status
- Data Deficient (IUCN 3.1)

Scientific classification
- Kingdom: Animalia
- Phylum: Chordata
- Class: Mammalia
- Order: Rodentia
- Family: Muridae
- Genus: Lemniscomys
- Species: L. roseveari

Binomial name
- Lemniscomys roseveari Van der Straeten, 1980

Species of rodent

Rosevear's lemniscomys or Rosevear's striped grass mouse (Lemniscomys roseveari) is a species of rodent in the family Muridae. It is found in Zambia and possibly Angola, where its natural habitat is cryptosephalum dry forest. The species is threatened by habitat loss.
