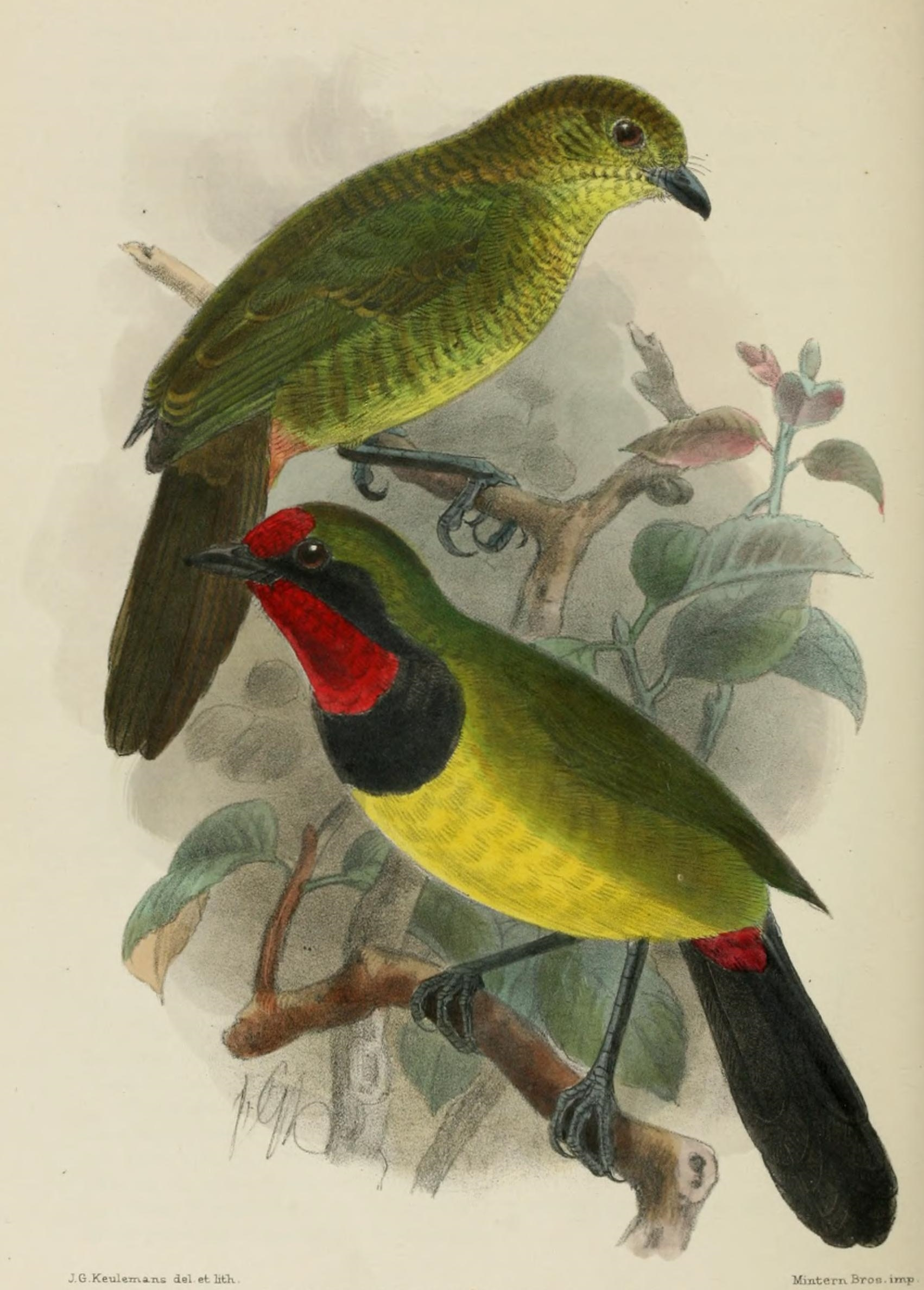
- Doherty's bushshrike (Telophorus dohertyi)

Scientific classification
- Kingdom: Animalia
- Phylum: Chordata
- Class: Aves
- Order: Passeriformes
- Family: Malaconotidae
- Genus: Telophorus; Swainson, 1832

Type species
- Telophorus collaris Swainson, 1832

Species
- About 3, see text

= Telophorus =

Genus of birds

Telophorus is a genus of African birds in the bushshrike family, Malaconotidae.

== Species ==
The genus contains the following three species:

Image	Scientific name	Common name	Distribution
	Telophorus zeylonus	Bokmakierie	southern Africa, mainly in South Africa and Namibia,
	Telophorus viridis	Gorgeous bushshrike	Angola, Republic of the Congo, Democratic Republic of the Congo, Gabon, Kenya, Tanzania, Malawi, Mozambique, Zimbabwe, Zambia, South Africa and Swaziland
	Telophorus dohertyi	Doherty's bushshrike	central eastern Democratic Republic of the Congo, Burundi, Rwanda, western Uganda and western and central Kenya
