= An Image of Africa =

1975 essay by Chinua Achebe

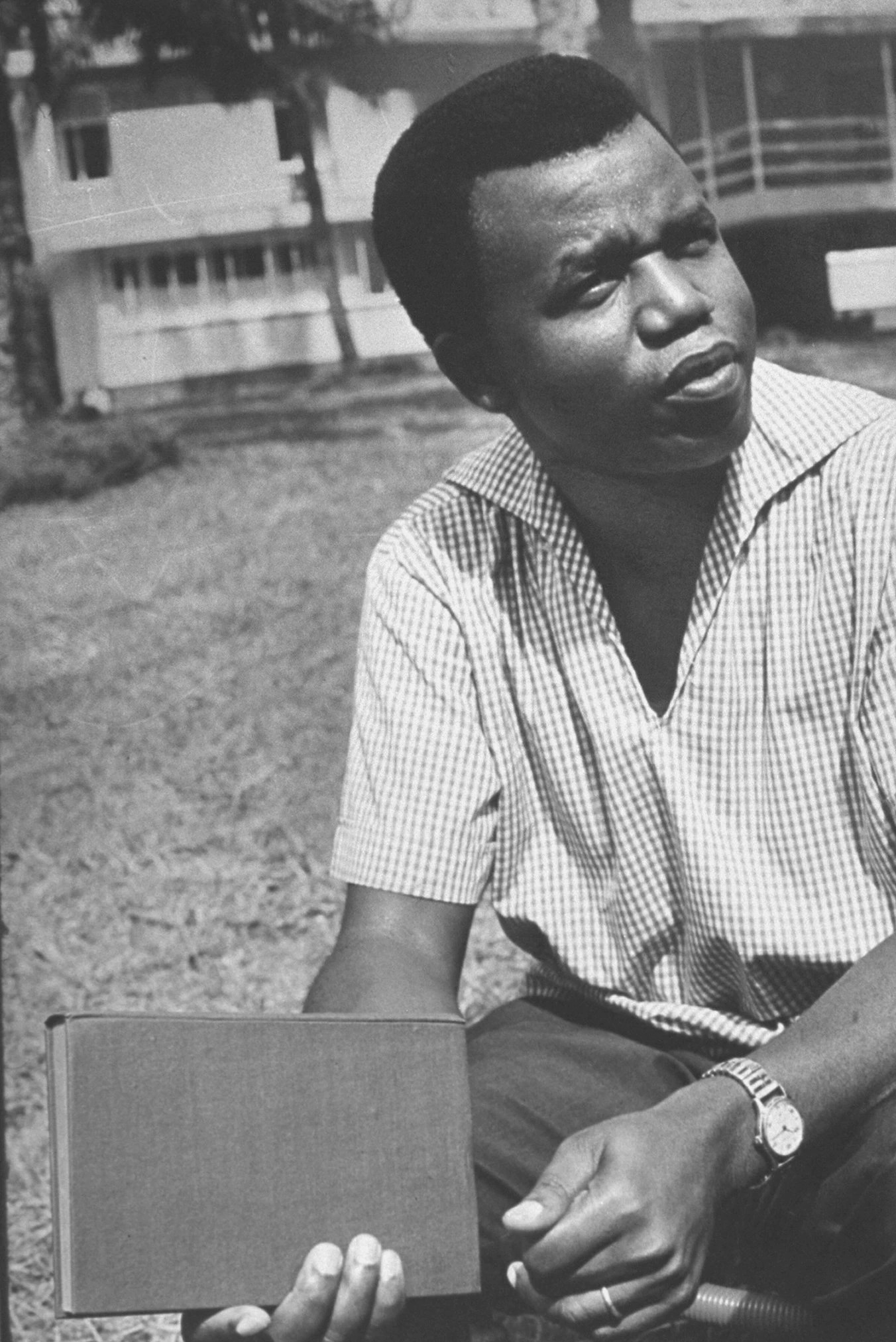
Chinua Achebe in 1966

"An Image of Africa: Racism in Conrad's Heart of Darkness" is the published and amended version of the second Chancellor's Lecture given by Nigerian writer and academic Chinua Achebe at the University of Massachusetts Amherst in February 1975. The essay was included in his 1988 collection, Hopes and Impediments. The text is considered to be part of the postcolonial critical movement, which advocates to Europeans the consideration of the viewpoints of non-European nations, as well as peoples coping with the effects of colonialism. In the work, Achebe accuses Joseph Conrad of being "a thoroughgoing racist" for depicting Africa as "the other world".

== The essay ==
According to Achebe, Conrad refuses to bestow "human expression" on Africans, even depriving them of language. Africa itself is rendered as "a foil to Europe, as a place of negations at once remote and vaguely familiar, in comparison with which Europe's own state of spiritual grace will be manifest". Conrad, he says, portrays Africa as "'the other world', the antithesis of Europe and therefore of civilization", which Achebe attributes to Conrad's "residue of antipathy to black people".

Achebe moves beyond the text of Conrad's Heart of Darkness in advancing his argument. Achebe quotes a passage from Conrad, as Conrad recalls his first encounter with an African in his own life:

A certain enormous buck nigger encountered in Haiti fixed my conception of blind, furious, unreasoning rage, as manifested in the human animal to the end of my days. Of the nigger I used to dream for years afterwards.

Achebe concludes that "Conrad had a problem with niggers. His inordinate love of that word itself should be of interest to psychoanalysts. Sometimes his fixation on blackness is equally interesting ..."

Achebe asserts that while Conrad was not himself responsible for the xenophobic "image of Africa" that appears in Heart of Darkness, his novel continues to perpetuate the damaging stereotypes of black peoples by its inclusion in the literary canon of the modern Western world. His searing critique is sometimes taught side by side with Conrad's work, and is regularly included in critical editions of the text.

== Counterpoint ==
The essay has been criticised for being "a political statement rather than a literary criticism". Conrad has frequently been defended on the basis of the historical context in which he lived, or on the grounds that his writing is nonetheless "beautiful".

The first comprehensive rebuttal of Achebe's critique was published in 1983 by British critic Cedric Watts. His essay "A Bloody Racist: About Achebe's View of Conrad" defends Heart of Darkness as an anti-imperialist novel, suggesting that "part of its greatness lies in the power of its criticisms of racial prejudice." Palestinian–American theorist Edward Said agreed in his book Culture and Imperialism that Conrad criticised imperialism, but added: "As a creature of his time, Conrad could not grant the natives their freedom, despite his severe critique of the imperialism that enslaved them". Building on Watts and Said, Nidesh Lawtoo argued that "underneath the first layer of straightforward opposition [...] we find an underlying mimetic continuity between Conrad's colonial image of Africa [in Heart of Darkness] and Achebe's postcolonial representation" in Things Fall Apart.

When questioned about his view as to the "artistic merit" of Conrad's work, Achebe responded:

I never said at any point that you should stop attaching artistic merit to Heart of Darkness; if you want to you can. There are all kinds of sophisticated readings of Heart of Darkness, and there are some people who will not be persuaded there is anything wrong with it. But all that I'm really demanding, I'm not simply putting it, I'm demanding that my reading stand beside these other readings ... Although he's writing good sentences, he's also writing about a people, and their life. And he says about these people that they are rudimentary souls ... The Africans are the rudimentaries, and then on top are the good whites. Now I don't accept that, as a basis for ... As a basis for anything.

== Sources ==
- Lawtoo, Nidesh (Spring 2013). "A Picture of Africa: Frenzy, Counternarrative, Mimesis". Modern Fiction Studies. 59 (1). Johns Hopkins University Press: 26–52. doi:10.1353/mfs.2013.0000. S2CID 161325915.
