= Ntambu =

Coordinates: 12°24′30″S 24°59′05″E

Ntambu is a populated place near the Kabompo river in the Mwinilunga District of Zambia's North Western Province. It is located roughly 619.95 kilometers (385.22 miles) Northwest of the Zambian Capital, Lusaka.

== History ==
in 2009 Ntambu Community Resources Board (CRB) was established. According to the Board their main objective is to "promote and develop an integrated approach in the management of Human, Cultural and Natural resources aspects in the Chibwika-Ntambu Game Management Area, as well as the open areas within Ntambu Chiefdom".

== Climate ==
Per the Koppen Climate System, Ntambu has a Monsoon Influenced Humid Subtropical Climate
