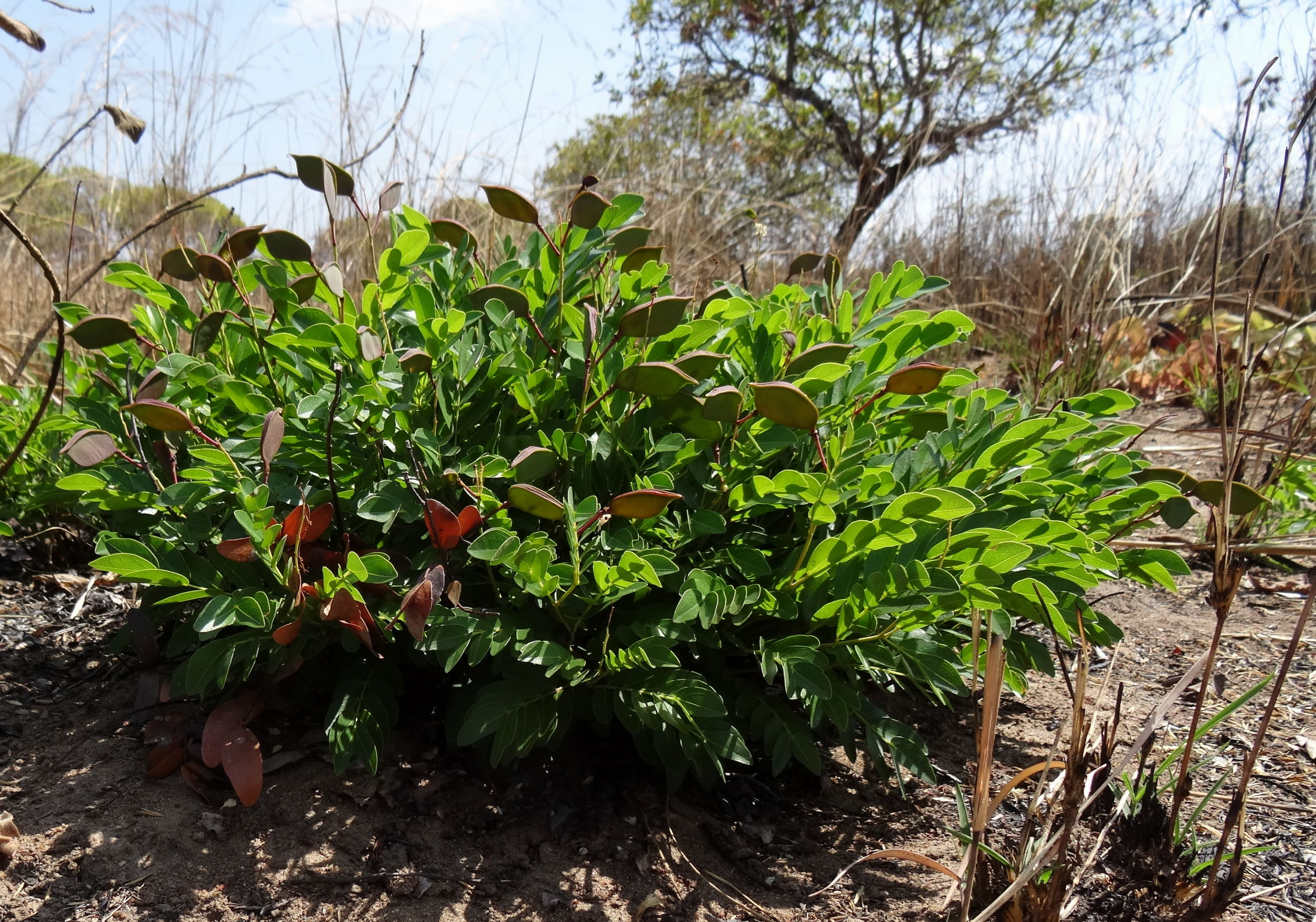
- Cryptosepalum maraviense

Scientific classification
- Kingdom: Plantae
- Clade: Tracheophytes
- Clade: Angiosperms
- Clade: Eudicots
- Clade: Rosids
- Order: Fabales
- Family: Fabaceae
- Subfamily: Detarioideae
- Tribe: Amherstieae
- Genus: Cryptosepalum; Benth. (1865)

Synonyms
- Dewindtia De Wild. (1902); Pynaertiodendron De Wild. (1915)

= Cryptosepalum =

Genus of legumes

Cryptosepalum is a genus of flowering plants in the family Fabaceae. There are 12 species, mostly trees. They are native to sub-Saharan Africa, ranging from Guinea to Tanzania, Mozambique, and Angola.

== Species ==
12 species are accepted:

- Cryptosepalum ambamense Letouzey
- Cryptosepalum congolanum (De Wild.) J.Léonard
- Cryptosepalum diphyllum P.A.Duvign. ex J.Léonard
- Cryptosepalum exfoliatum De Wild.
- Cryptosepalum katangense (De Wild.) J.Léonard
- Cryptosepalum korupense Burgt
- Cryptosepalum maraviense Oliv.
- Cryptosepalum mimosoides Welw. ex Oliv.
- Cryptosepalum minutifolium (A.Chev.) Hutch. & Dalziel
- Cryptosepalum pellegrinianum (J.Léonard) J.Léonard
- Cryptosepalum staudtii Harms
- Cryptosepalum tetraphyllum (Hook.f.) Benth.
