= Western Zambezian grasslands =

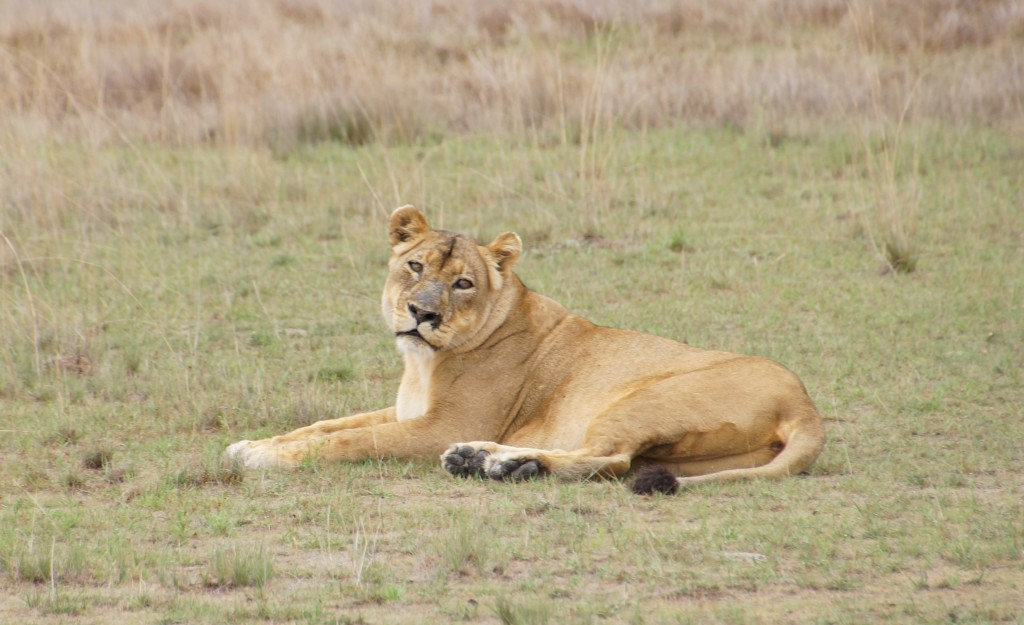
- Lion in Liuwa Plain National Park, Zambia

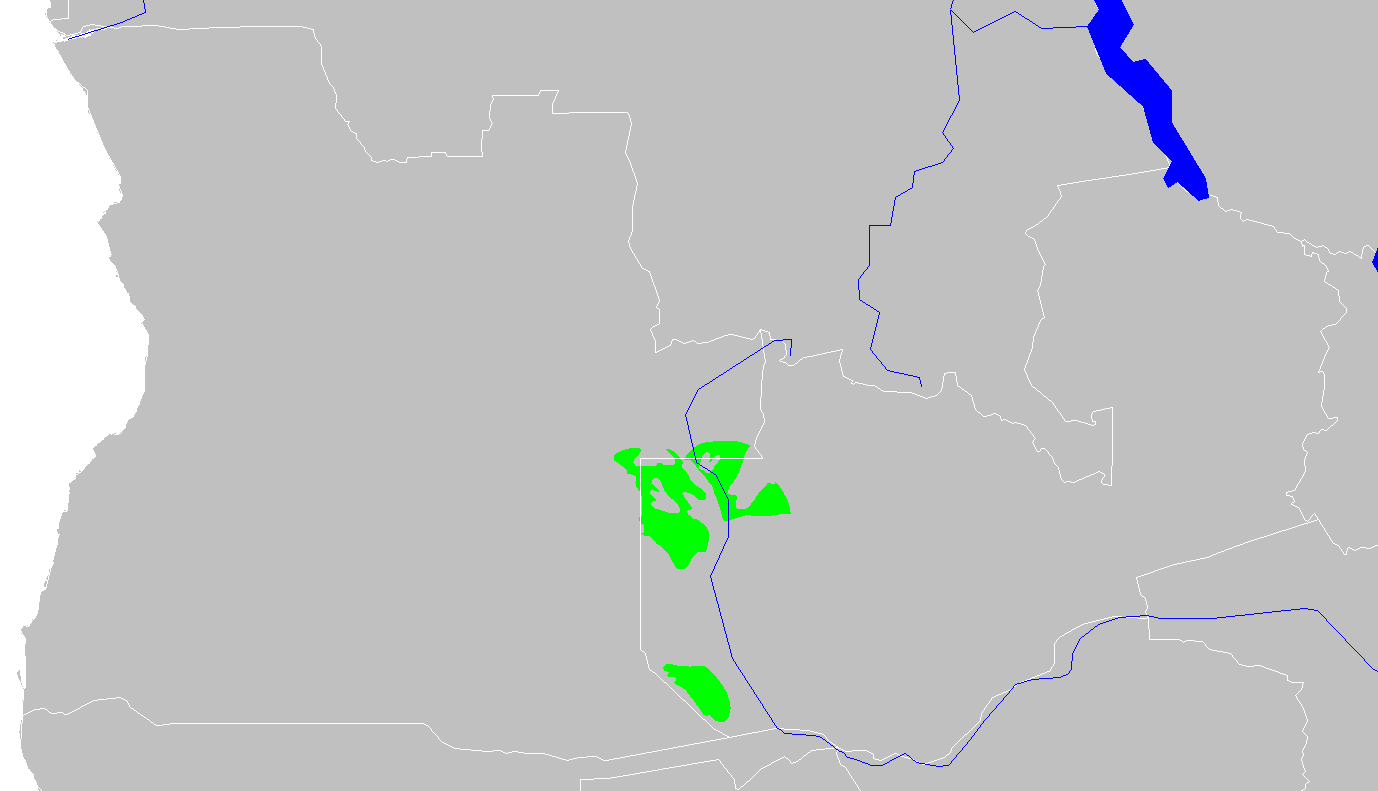
- Location of the ecoregion

Ecology
- Realm: Afrotropical
- Biome: tropical and subtropical grasslands, savannas, and shrublands
- Borders: Angolan miombo woodlands; Central Zambezian miombo woodlands; Zambezian cryptosepalum dry forests; Zambezian flooded grasslands

Geography
- Area: 33,900 km^{2} (13,100 sq mi)
- Countries: Zambia; Angola
- Coordinates: 13.1°S 22.4°E

Conservation
- Conservation status: Relatively stable/intact
- Protected: 51.2%

The Western Zambezian grasslands is a tropical grassland ecoregion of eastern Zambia and adjacent parts of Angola. It is situated in two sections, to the north and south of the Barotse Floodplain. The region supports herds of ungulates, including Zambia's largest herd of Blue Wildebeast (Connochaetes taurinus).

== Topography ==
The Western Zambezian grasslands are found in areas of sandy soil north and south of the Barotse Floodplain in eastern Zambia. They are characterized by deep, sandy, nutrient-poor soils which are waterlogged during the rainy season, and become very dry during the dry season. They are intertwined with the Zambezian Cryptosepalum dry forests ecoregion, which is found on similar soils at slightly higher elevations with better drainage. Surrounding ecoregions include the Zambezian flooded grasslands of the Barotse Floodplain, the Angolan miombo woodlands to the northwest, the Central Zambezian miombo woodlands to the northeast and east, and the Zambezian Baikiaea woodlands to the east and south.

== Climate ==
The climate of the ecoregion is Oceanic climate, subtropical highland variety (Köppen climate classification (Cwb)). This climate has cool summers and cool, but not cold, winters. It is usually associated with coastal areas in mid-latitudes, but is also experienced at higher altitudes inland. Temperatures and precipitation are relatively even throughout the year, with no month averaging below 0 °C (32 °F), and no month averaging above 22 °C (72 °F). Mean precipitation is 800 to 1,000 mm/year.

== Flora and fauna ==
About 38% of the cover is herbaceous vegetation, 28% is closed deciduous forest, 20% is open broadleaf forest, 8% is shrub covered, and the remainder is wetland.

== Protected areas ==
About 51.2% of the ecoregion is within an officially protected area, including Sioma Ngwezi National Park, Liuwa Plain National Park, West Zambezi Game Management Area, Chizera Game Management Area, and several forest reserves.
