= Woodland =

Land covered in trees

An open woodland in North Lanarkshire, Scotland

A woodland (/wʊdlənd/) is, in the broad sense, land covered with woody plants (trees and shrubs), or in a narrow sense, synonymous with wood (or in the United States, the plurale tantum woods), a low-density forest forming open habitats with plenty of sunlight and limited shade (see differences between British, American and Australian English explained below). Some savannas may also be woodlands, such as savanna woodland, where trees and shrubs form a light canopy.

Woodlands may support an understory of shrubs and herbaceous plants including grasses. Woodland may form a transition to shrubland under drier conditions or during early stages of primary or secondary succession. Higher-density areas of trees with a largely closed canopy that provides extensive and nearly continuous shade are often referred to as forests.

Extensive efforts by conservationist groups have been made to preserve woodlands from urbanization and agriculture. For example, the woodlands of Northwest Indiana have been preserved as part of the Indiana Dunes.

== Definitions ==
=== United Kingdom ===
Woodland is used in British woodland management to mean tree-covered areas which arose naturally and which are then managed. At the same time, forest is usually used in the British Isles to describe plantations, usually more extensive, or hunting forests, which are a land use with a legal definition and may not be wooded at all. The term ancient woodland is used in British nature conservation to refer to any wooded land that has existed since 1600, and often (though not always) for thousands of years, since the last Ice Age (equivalent to the American term old-growth forest).

=== North America ===
In ecosystem conservation, the term woodland refers to the plants, animals, and other biota that live in and under scattered trees that are spaced so that they produce more shade than a savanna but less than a forest. In central North America, the most numerous woodland trees are oaks. Woodlands typically require regular fire to maintain their biodiversity. Woodlands were historically among the most widespread ecosystem types but now are restricted to sites that receive regular prescribed burns or persist on very poor or dry soils. Details differ, as seen in definitions and examples given for Illinois, Wisconsin, and elsewhere in the Midwest.

Woodlot is a closely related term in American forest management, which refers to a stand of trees generally used for firewood. While woodlots often technically have closed canopies, they are so small that light penetration from the edge makes them ecologically closer to woodland than forest. North American forests vary widely in their ecology and are greatly dependent on abiotic factors such as climate and elevation. Much of the old-growth deciduous and pine-dominated forests of the eastern United States was harvested for lumber, paper pulp, telephone poles, creosote, pitch, and tar.

=== Australia ===
In Australia, a woodland is defined as an area with a sparse (10–30%) cover of trees, and an open woodland has a very sparse (<10%) cover. Woodlands are also subdivided into tall woodlands or low woodlands if their trees are over 30 m (98 ft) or under 10 m (33 ft) high, respectively. This contrasts with forests, which have more than 30% of their area covered by trees.

== Woodland ecoregions ==
=== Tropical and subtropical grasslands, savannas, and shrub lands ===
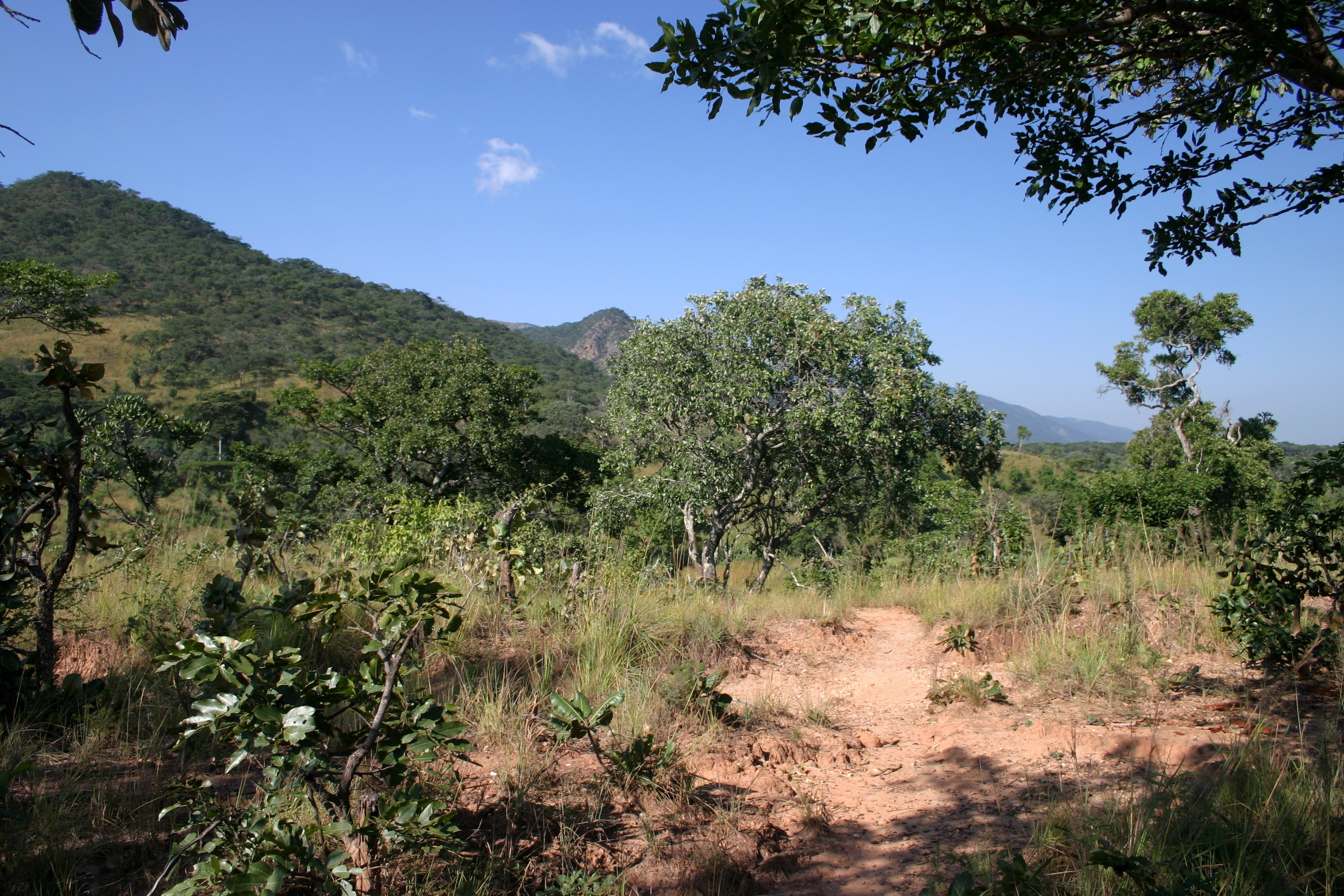
Miombo woodland in Malawi

- Afrotropical realm
  - Angolan miombo woodlands (Angola)
  - Angolan mopane woodlands (Angola, Namibia)
  - Central Zambezian miombo woodlands (Angola, Burundi, Democratic Republic of the Congo, Malawi, Tanzania, Zambia)
  - Eastern miombo woodlands (Mozambique, Tanzania)
  - Kalahari Acacia-Baikiaea woodlands (Botswana, Namibia, South Africa, Zimbabwe)
  - Zambezian and mopane woodlands (Botswana, Eswatini, Malawi, Mozambique, Namibia, South Africa, Zambia, Zimbabwe)
  - Zambezian Baikiaea woodlands (Angola, Botswana, Namibia, Zambia, Zimbabwe)
- Nearctic realm
  - Madrean pine–oak woodlands (Mexico)
- Neotropical realm
  - Cerrado woodlands and savannas (Bolivia, Brazil, Paraguay)

=== Temperate grasslands, savannas, and shrublands ===
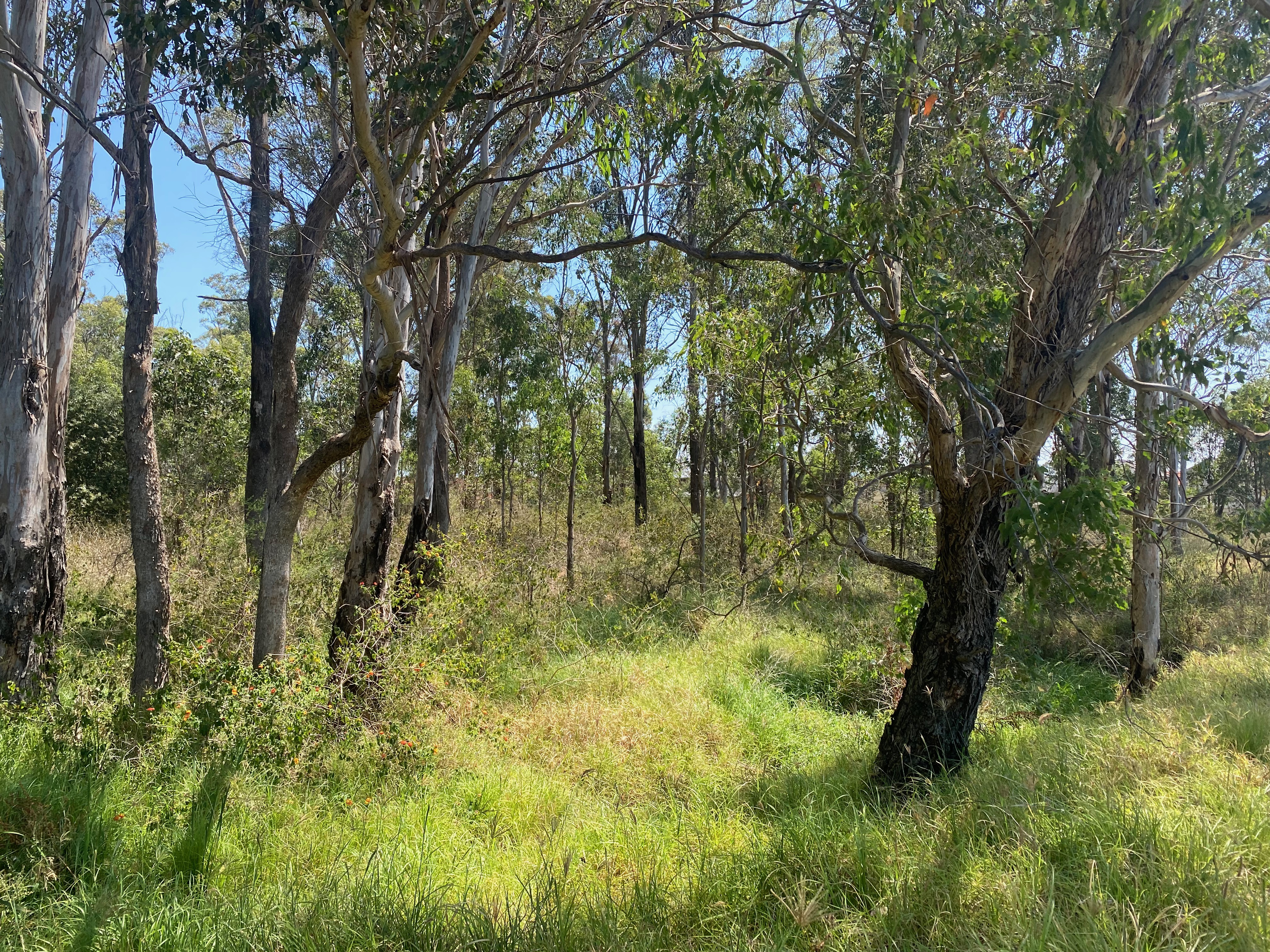
A dry sclerophyll woodland in western Sydney.

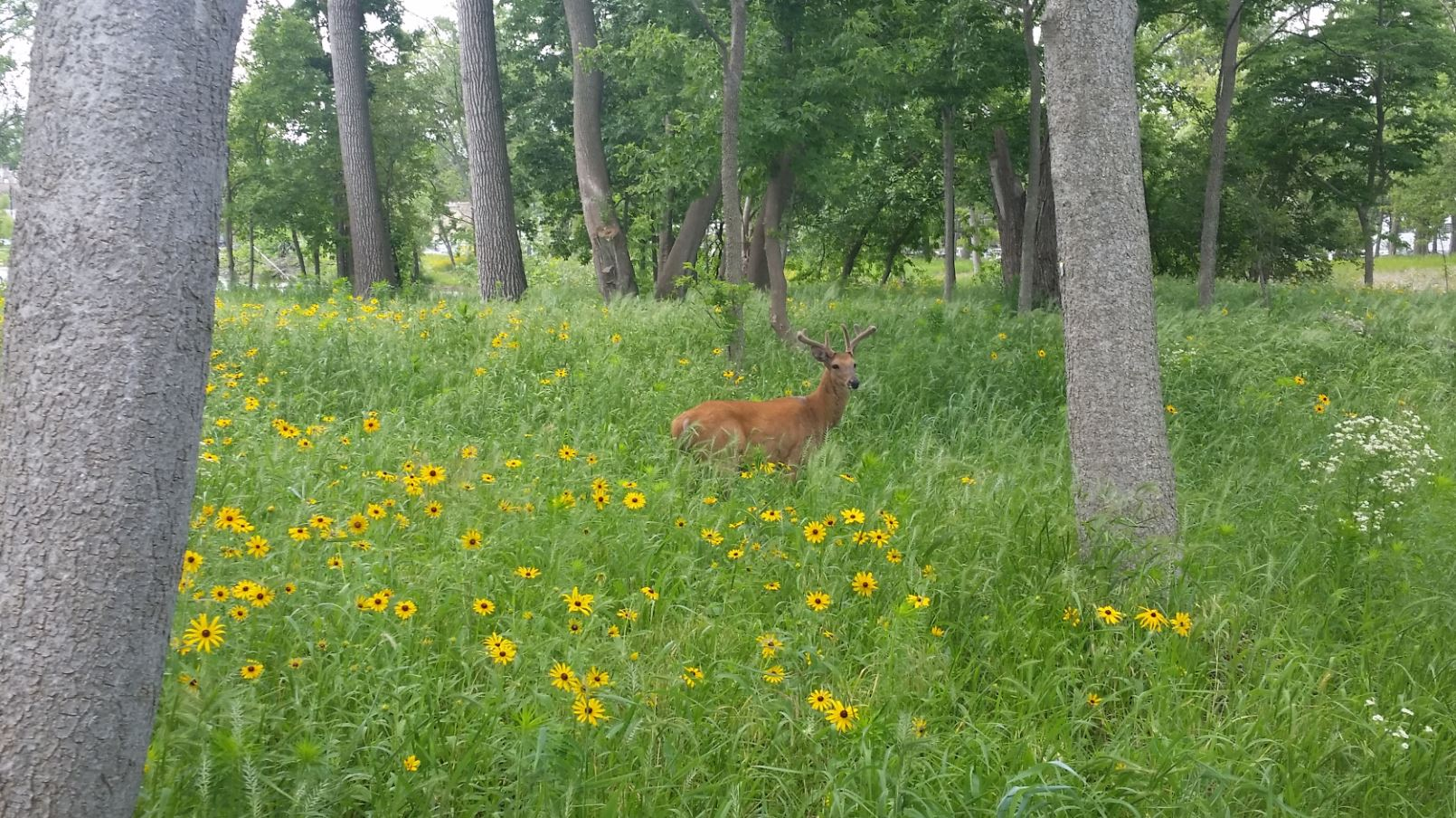
An open woodland in Northern Illinois supporting an herbaceous understory of forbs and grasses

- Afrotropical realm
  - Al Hajar montane woodlands (Oman)
- Australasian realm
  - Central Hunter Valley eucalypt forest and woodland (Australia)
  - Cumberland Plain Woodland (Australia)
  - Gippsland Plains Grassy Woodland (Australia)
  - Grey Box Grassy Woodlands (Australia)
  - Lowland Grassy Woodland (Australia)
  - New England Peppermint Grassy Woodland (Australia)
- Nearctic realm
  - Central forest–grasslands transition (United States)
  - Upper Midwest forest–savanna transition (United States)
- Palearctic realm
  - Gissaro-Alai open woodlands (Kyrgyzstan, Tajikistan, Uzbekistan)

=== Montane grasslands and shrublands ===
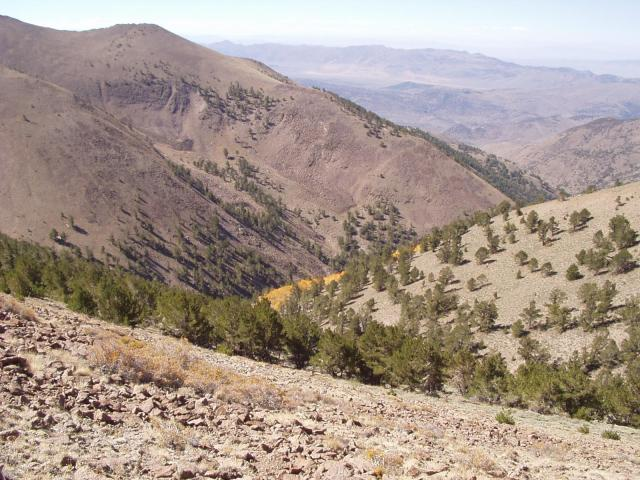
Limber Pine woodland in the Toiyabe Range of central Nevada

- Afrotropical realm
  - Angolan Scarp savanna and woodlands (Angola)
  - Drakensberg alti-montane grasslands and woodlands (Lesotho, South Africa)
  - Drakensberg montane grasslands, woodlands and forests (Eswatini, Lesotho, South Africa)
  - East African montane moorlands (Kenya, Sudan, Tanzania, Uganda)
  - Ethiopian montane grasslands and woodlands (Ethiopia)
- Nearctic realm
  - Pinyon–juniper woodland (United States)
- Palearctic realm
  - Kopet Dag woodlands and forest steppe (Iran, Turkmenistan)

=== Mediterranean forests, woodlands, and scrub ===
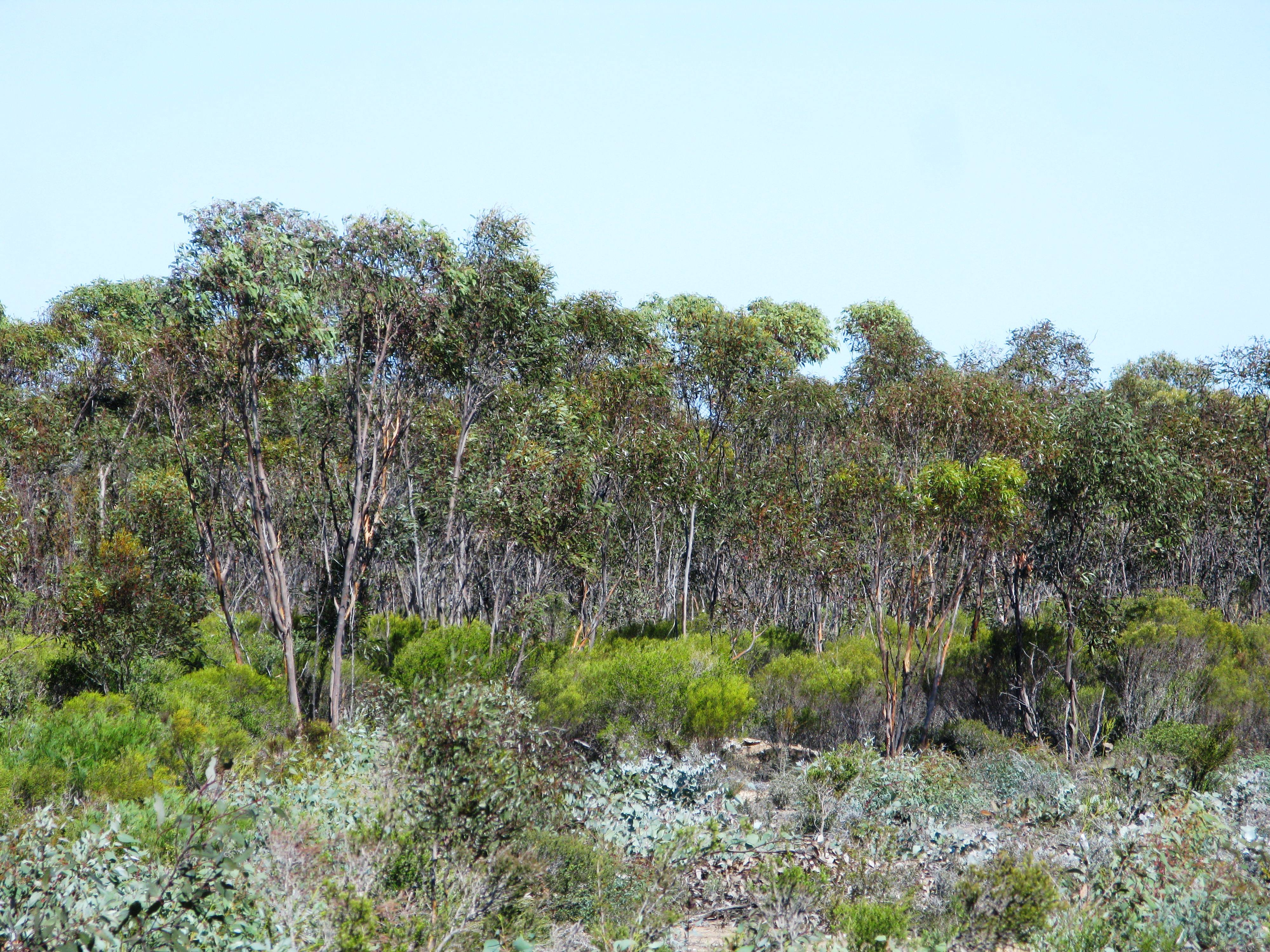
Mallee woodland with eucalyptuses and melaleucas in Esperance, Western Australia

- Australasian realm
  - Banksia Woodlands of the Swan Coastal Plain (Australia)
  - Coolgardie woodlands (Australia)
  - Mount Lofty woodlands (Australia)
  - Murray-Darling woodlands and mallee (Australia)
  - Naracoorte woodlands (Australia)
  - Southwest Australia woodlands (Australia)
  - Swan Coastal Plain Shrublands and Woodlands (Australia)
- Nearctic realm
  - California chaparral and woodlands (United States)
  - California montane chaparral and woodlands (United States)
  - California interior chaparral and woodlands (United States)

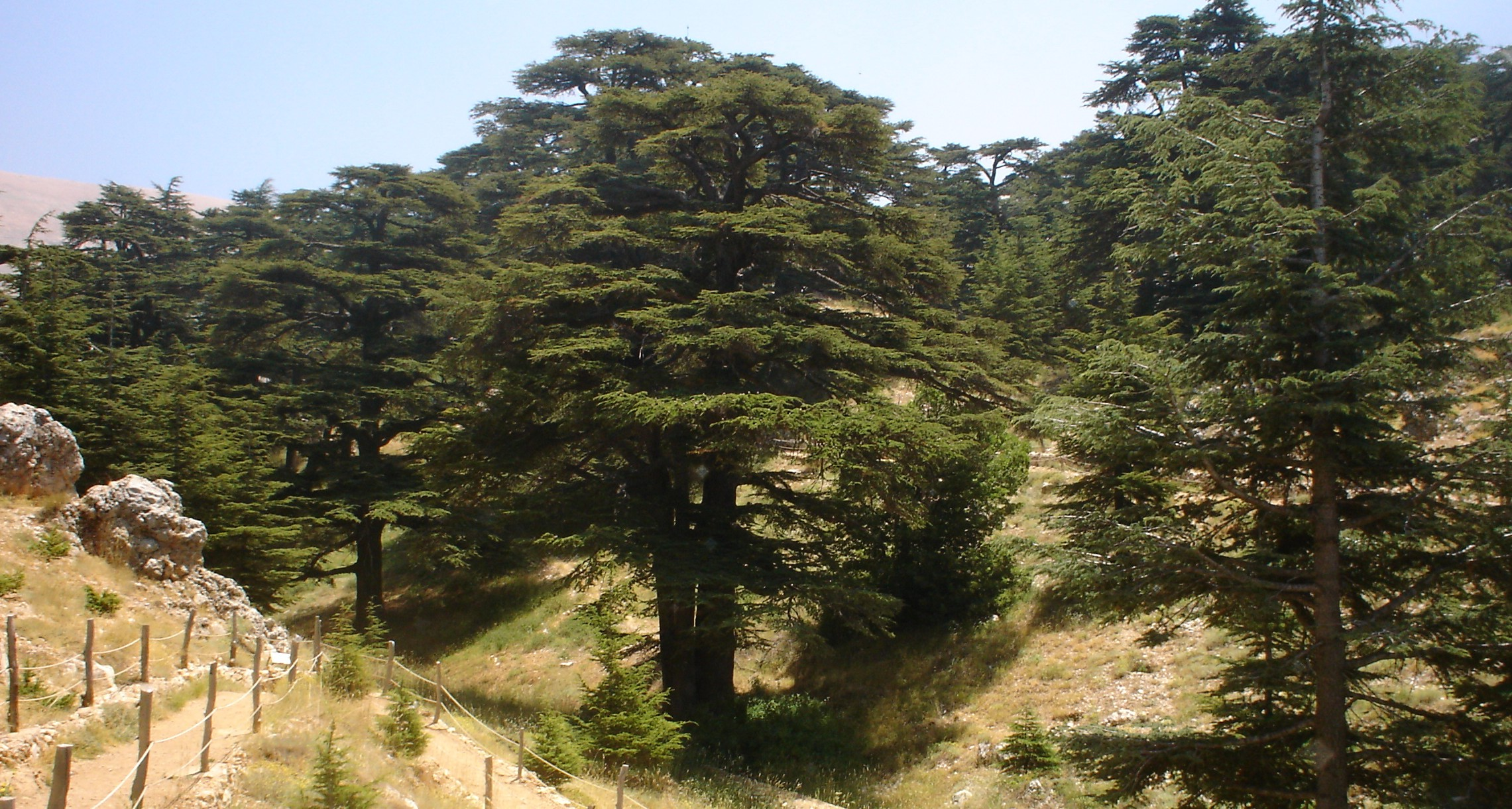
A cedar woodland in Bsharri, Lebanon

- Palearctic realm
  - Canary Islands dry woodlands and forests (Spain)
  - Eastern Mediterranean conifer–sclerophyllous–broadleaf forests (Turkey, Syria, Israel, Jordan, Iraq, Lebanon)
  - Mediterranean acacia-argania dry woodlands and succulent thickets (Morocco, Canary Islands)
  - Mediterranean dry woodlands and steppe (Algeria, Egypt, Libya, Morocco, Tunisia)
  - Mediterranean woodlands and forests (Algeria, Morocco, Tunisia)
  - Southeastern Iberian shrubs and woodlands (Spain)

=== Deserts and xeric shrublands ===
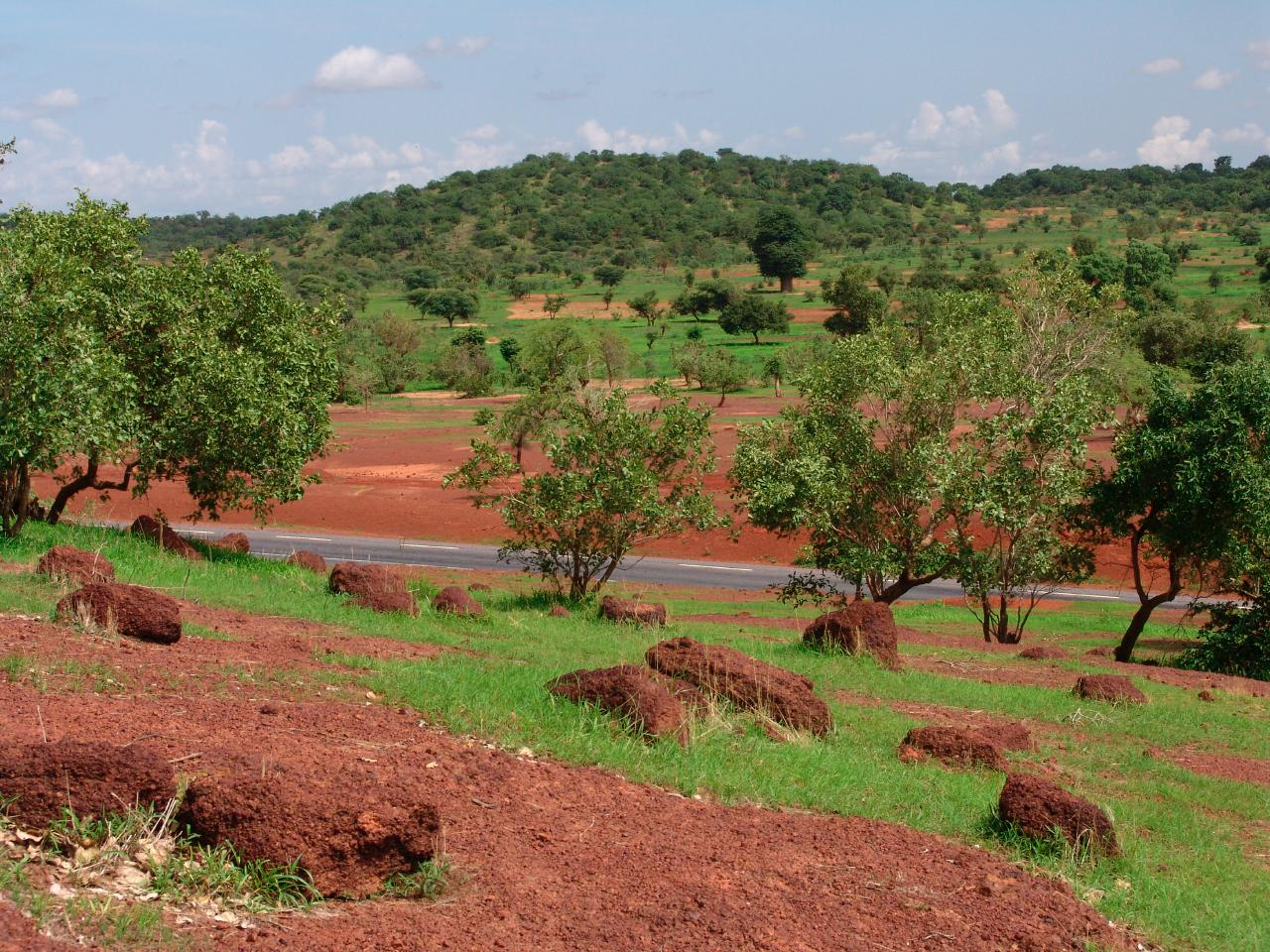
Sahel woodland in Mali

- Afrotropical realm
  - East Saharan montane xeric woodlands (Chad, Sudan)
  - Madagascar succulent woodlands (Madagascar)
  - Somali montane xeric woodlands (Somalia)
  - Southwestern Arabian montane woodlands (Saudi Arabia, Yemen)
- Palearctic realm
  - Baluchistan xeric woodlands (Afghanistan, Pakistan)
  - Central Afghan Mountains xeric woodlands (Afghanistan)
  - Central Asian riparian woodlands (Kazakhstan)
  - North Saharan steppe and woodlands (Algeria, Egypt, Libya, Morocco, Tunisia, Western Sahara)
  - Paropamisus xeric woodlands (Afghanistan)
  - South Saharan steppe and woodlands (Algeria, Chad, Mali, Mauritania, Niger, Sudan)
  - Tibesti-Jebel Uweinat montane xeric woodlands (Chad, Egypt, Libya, Sudan)
  - West Saharan montane xeric woodlands (Algeria, Mali, Mauritania, Niger)

== See also ==
- Agroforestry
- Biosphere
- Clearcutting
- Chase (land)
- Deforestation
- Dendrology
- Dendrometry
- Ecological succession
- Forest dynamics
- Forest migration
- Forest pathology
- Forestry Commission
- Intact forest landscape
- Natural environment
- Natural landscape
- Permaforestry
- REDD-plus
- Royal Forestry Society
- Silviculture
- Tree allometry
- Tree farm
- Wildcrafting
- Woodland garden
