= Bicuari National Park =

National park in Angola

Bicuari/Huíla National Park
- Bicuar National Park
- IUCN category II (national park)
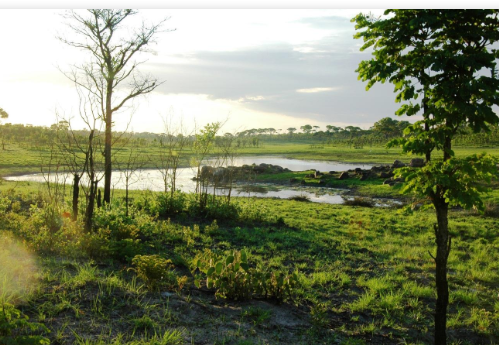
- Marshy area of Bicuar National Park

- Location within Angola
- Location: Huíla Province, Angola
- Nearest city: Lubango
- Coordinates: 15°17′23″S 14°48′26″E
- Area: 7,900 km^{2} (3,100 sq mi)
- Established: 1964

Bicuari National Park (Portuguese: Parque Nacional do Bicuar; also called Bicuar National Park or Bikuar/Huíla National Park) is a national park in Angola. It is located in the south-west region of the country on the Huíla Plateau, about 120 km (75 mi) southeast of Lubango. The park is an area of sandy hills and shrub thicket character. The climate is tropical semi-arid. Bicuar was established as a hunting reserve in 1938, and reformed as a national park in 1964. Historically known for its large mammals, such as the black buffalo, the park suffered heavily in the Angolan Civil War (1975–2002). During this time the animals were mostly or entirely exterminated, but the Angolan Government is now undertaking efforts to rebuild the infrastructure and resettle the animals.

== Natural features ==
The park is bordered on the east by the Cunene River, one of the few perennial rivers in the region. The dominant vegetation is described as Angolan miombo woodlands and Angolan mopane woodlands, an area of savanna and woodlands on the plateau east of the coastal hills. Portions of the park are seasonally wet or wetland swamps and dambo grasslands.

The Bicuar stands at the northern end of a distinct ecoregion known as the Angolan mopane woodlands. The area is known for high species richness, variable rainfall, and the importance of mopane trees to the animals and people of the region.

The climate of Bicuari is described under the Köppen climate classification system as temperate highland tropical climate with dry winters (Cwb), and the warmest months' temperatures average below 22 °C (72 °F). Average rainfall is 600–800 mm/year.

== Animal life ==
The area has historically been known for large herds of common antelopes, elephants, and other large mammals. Besides elephants and antelopes, the park also reportedly supports spotted hyenas, lions, elands, gnus and zebras.

All species populations are believed to have been severely reduced during the war (the park was reportedly used as a practice artillery range), poaching, and human encroachment. Since cessation of hostilities, work has begun by the Huíla provincial government to rebuild the infrastructure of the park to attract and protect animals. As of 2013, it has been reported that some of the large mammals are returning to Bicuar. The park administrator noted that they "are happy with the return of herds of elephants into the municipalities of Quipungo, Matala and Gambos, as the animals are recognising their habitat and are reproducing inside the park".
