= Namibian savanna woodlands =

Ecoregion in Namibia

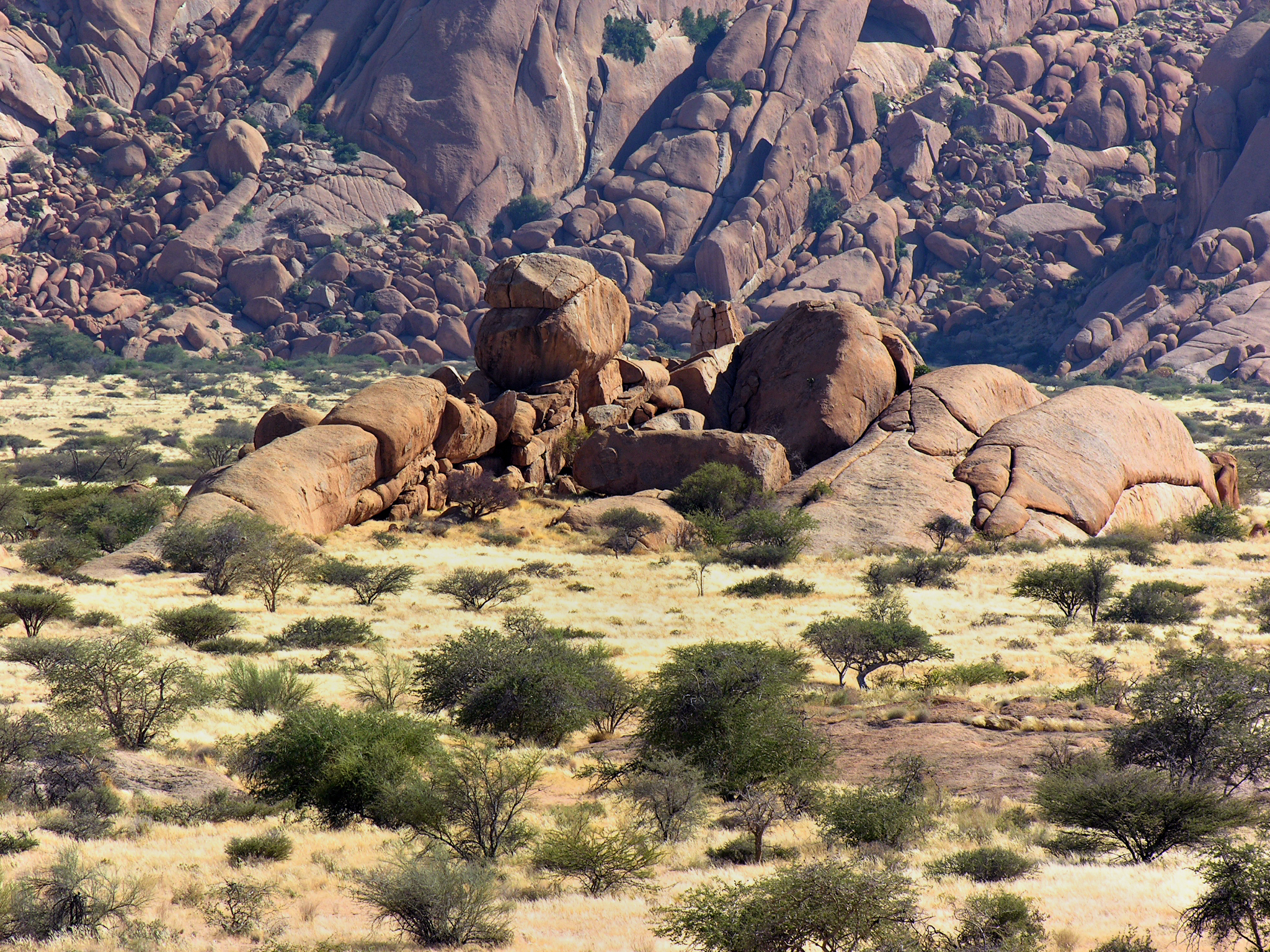
- Savanna woodlands near Mount Erongo, Namibia

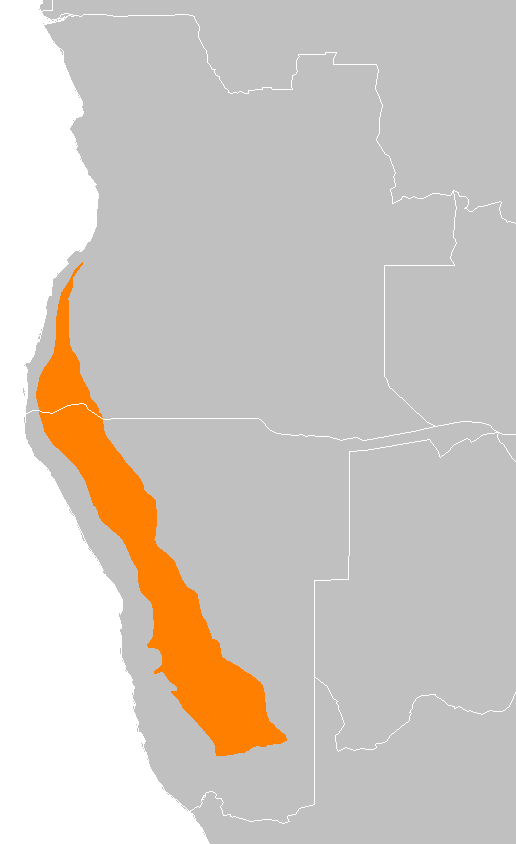
- map of the Namibian savanna woodlands

Ecology
- Realm: Afrotropic
- Biome: Deserts and xeric shrublands
- Borders: List: Angolan miombo woodlands; Angolan mopane woodlands; Kalahari xeric savanna; Kaokoveld desert; Nama Karoo, Namib desert

Geography
- Area: 225,500 km^{2} (87,100 sq mi)
- Countries: Angola; Namibia

Conservation
- Conservation status: relatively intact

The Namibian savanna woodlands, also known as the Namib escarpment woodlands, are the deserts and xeric shrublands ecoregion of Namibia and Angola.

== Geography ==
They extend north and south from southwestern Angola to central Namibia, east of the coastal Namib Desert. The woodlands cover the Namib escarpment, which rises from the low-lying Namib coastal plain to the Southern African plateau on the east. Baynes (2038 m), Erongo (2319 m), Naukluft (1974 m), Spitzkoppe (1759 m), and Gamsberg (2347 m) mountains lie along the edge of the escarpment. Brandberg Mountain (2,573 m) lies west of the escarpment in the Namib Desert, and is included in the ecoregion.

To the northeast lie more humid woodland and savanna ecoregions – the Angolan miombo woodlands at the furthest northern end, and the Angolan mopane woodlands to the northeast. To the east is the arid Kalahari xeric savanna, and to the south are the low desert shrublands of the Nama Karoo.

== Climate ==
The ecoregion has a semi-arid to arid climate. Average annual rainfall varies from 60 mm in the west to 200 mm in the east. Most rain falls as thundershowers during the October-to-March summer months. Rainfall varies from year to year, with the greatest variation in the dry west. The ecoregion lacks the moderating influence on temperature and humidity that the Benguela Current brings to the coastal deserts to the west. Summer weather can be extremely hot, with the monthly mean exceeding 40º C during the hottest summer month. Frosts are common in the winter, and monthly minimum temperatures can drop below -9º C in the colder parts of the ecoregion.

== Flora ==
The varying rainfall, topography, and soils within the ecoregion supports several plant communities. In the north and east, Mopane savanna with the trees Colophospermum mopane, Sesamothamnus benguellensis, and S. guerichii, is predominant. The semi-desert and savanna transition community supports a variety of species. In the south, open dwarf shrub savanna, with small trees scattered among shrubs, herbs, and grasses, is predominant.

The ecoregion has many endemic species, particularly on the Brandberg and the Kaoko escarpment.

== Fauna ==
Large mammal herbivores in the ecoregion include the African bush elephant (Loxodonta africana), black rhinoceros (Diceros bicornis), greater kudu (Tragelaphus strepsiceros), springbok (Antidorcas marsupialis), gemsbok (Oryx gazella), Damara dik-dik (Madoqua kirkii damarensis), and black-faced impala (Aepyceros melampus petersi). Mammal predators include the lion (Panthera leo), leopard (Panthera pardus), cheetah (Acinonyx jubatus), bat-eared fox, (Otocyon megalotis), and Cape fox (Vulpes chama).

Limited-range species and subspecies native to the ecoregion include Hartmann's mountain zebra (Equus zebra hartmannae), Angolan slender mongoose (Galerella flavescens), Shortridge's rock mouse (Petromyscus shortridgei), Angolan hairy bat (Cistugo seabrae), and Namib long-eared bat (Laephotis namibensis).

== Protected areas ==
The Namib-Naukluft National Park lies mostly west of the ecoregion in the Namib desert, but also includes the Naukluft Mountains and portions of the western escarpment. The western portion of the Etosha National Park extends into the ecoregion.
