= Angolan mopane woodlands =

Ecoregion in Angola and Namibia

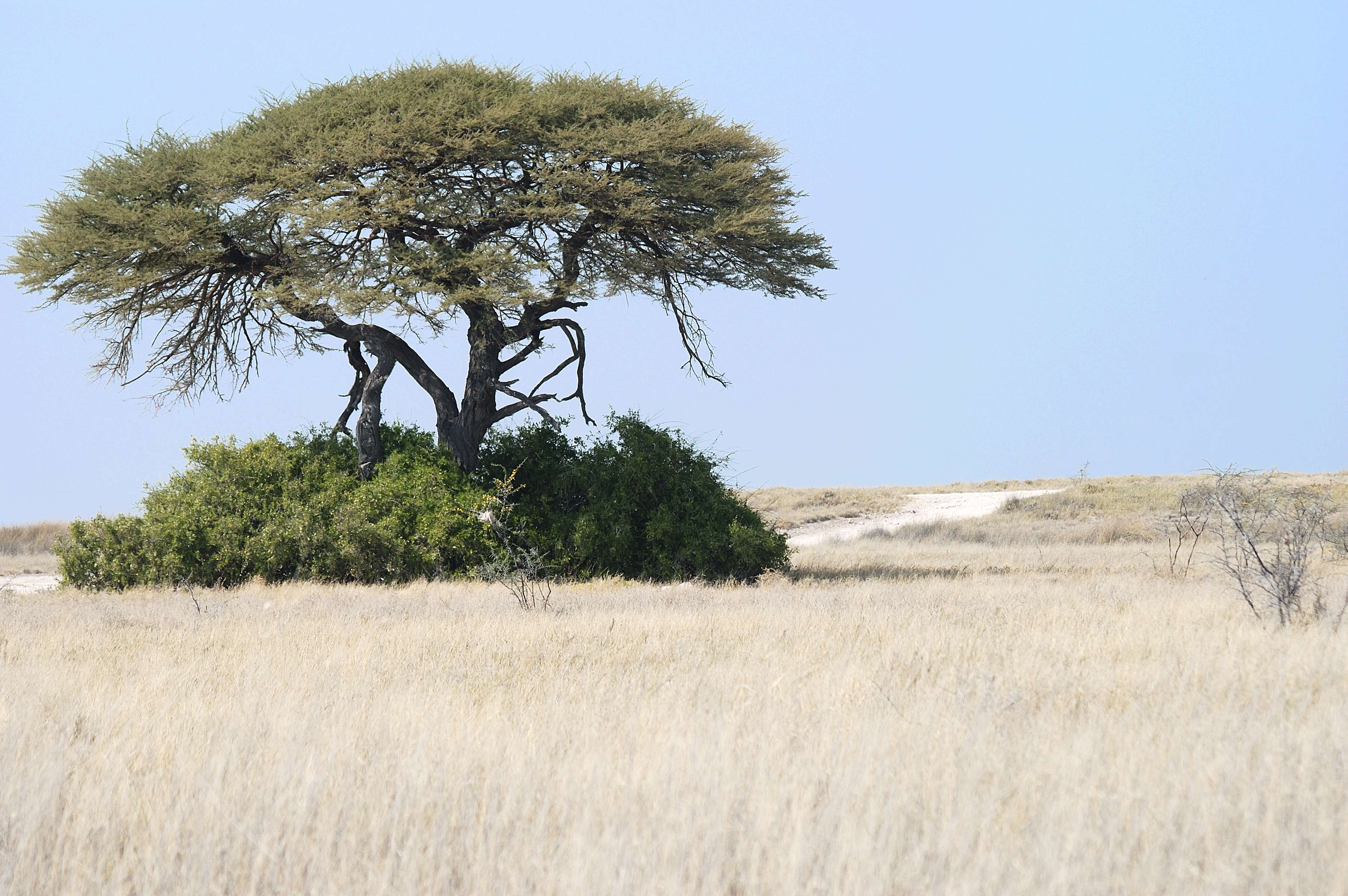
- Savanna at Etosha National Park in Namibia

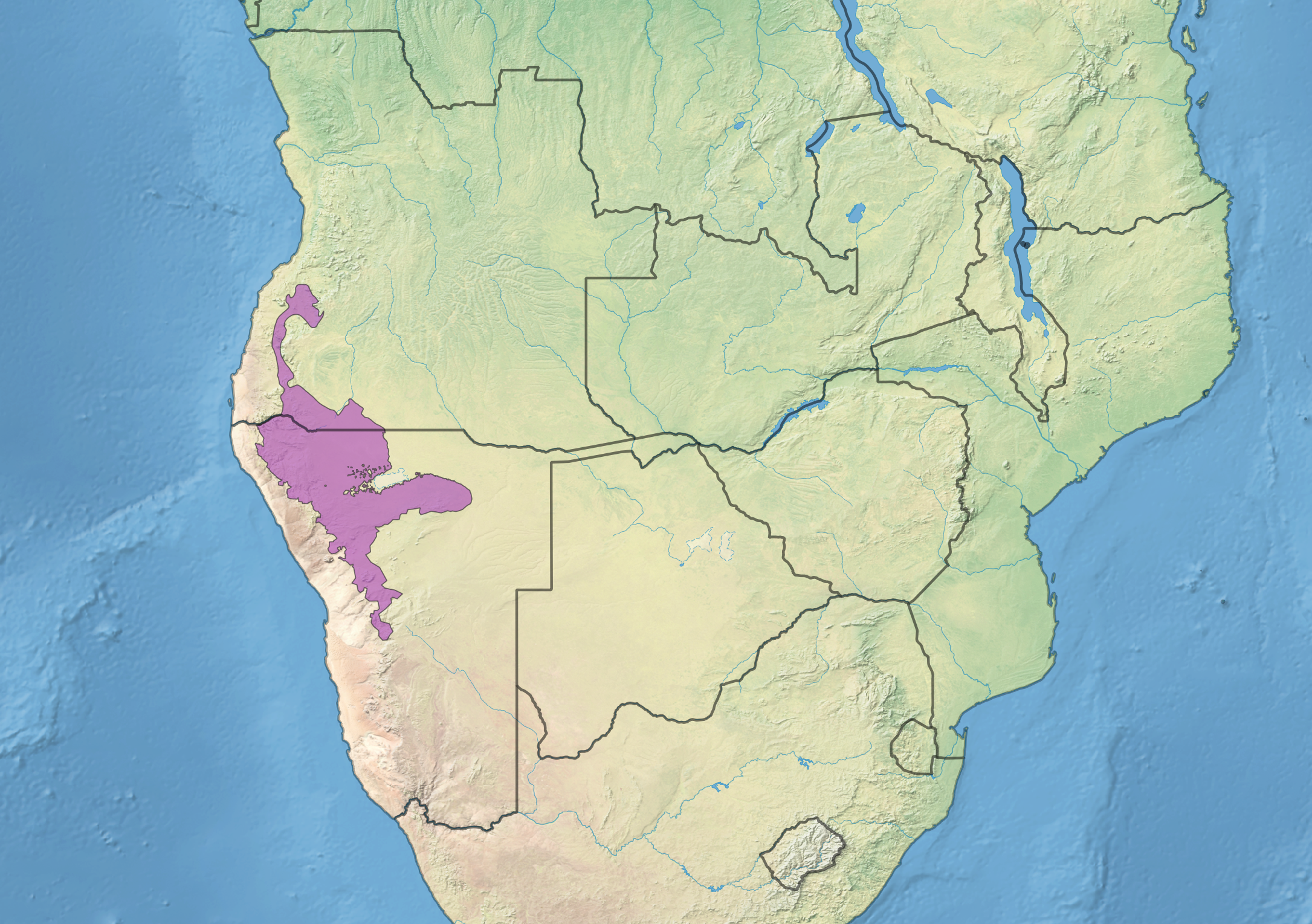
- Map of the Angolan mopane woodlands

Ecology
- Realm: Afrotropic
- Biome: Tropical and subtropical grasslands, savannas, and shrublands

Geography
- Area: 133,400 km^{2} (51,500 sq mi)
- Countries: Angola; Namibia

Conservation
- Conservation status: Critical/Endangered

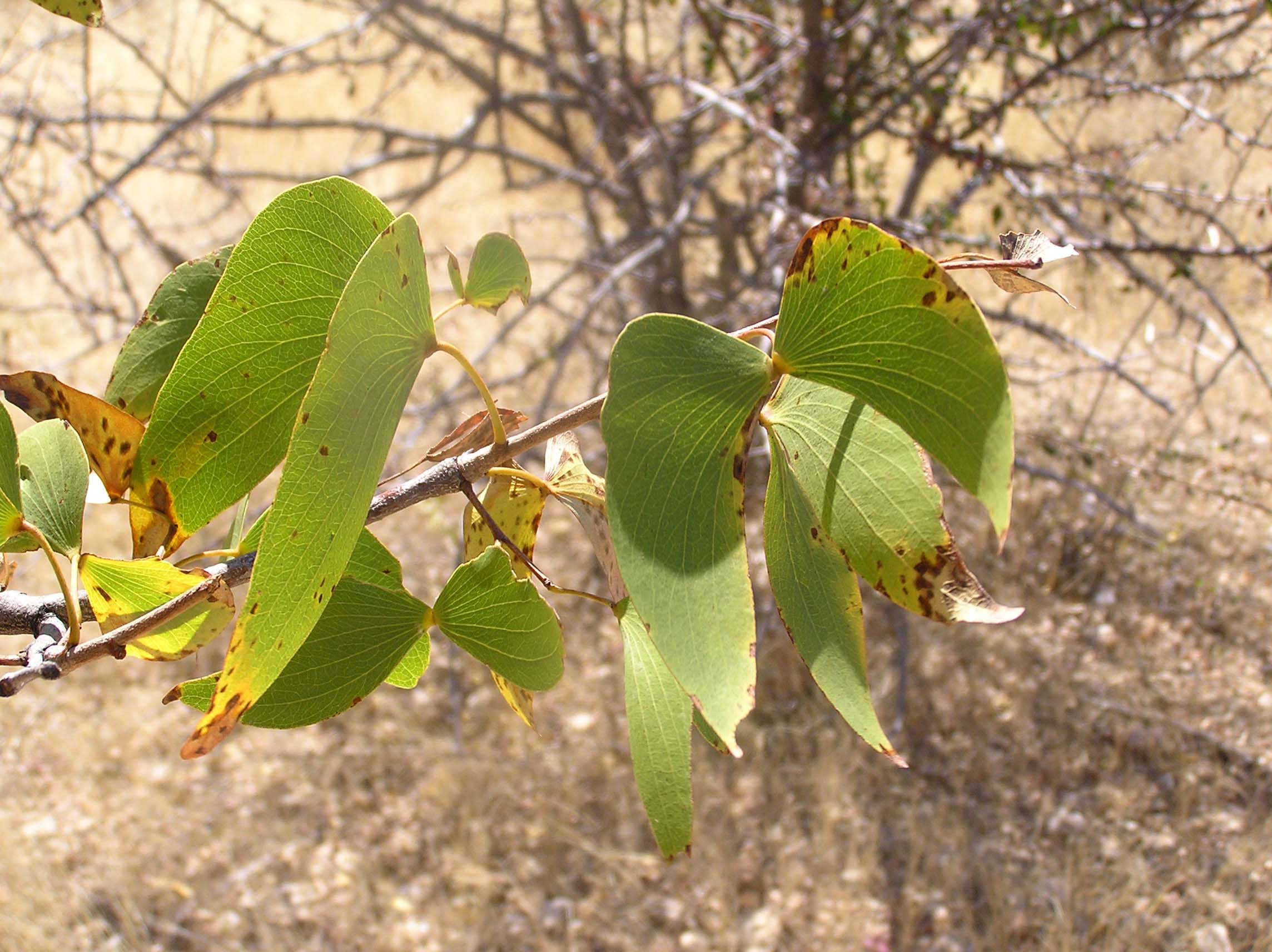
The mopane tree

Angolan mopane woodlands are situated in southwestern Angola, extending into northern Namibia. This ecosystem surrounds Etosha Pan, which is considered a separate ecoregion. The mopane trees are the main type of vegetation.

== Location and description ==
In Angola the region mostly comprises the southern Cunene Province and in Namibia in the regions of Omusati, Oshana and the eastern inland arm of Kunene and areas of Oshikoto surrounding the Etosha Pan. The ecoregion includes the Cunene River which divides the two countries, and is one of the main sources of water in this dry region. The landscape is mainly flat. The rainy season is late summer.

The mopane woodlands are bounded on the west by the drier Namibian savanna woodlands. The Angolan miombo woodlands lie to the north, the Zambezian Baikiaea woodlands to the northeast, and the Kalahari Acacia-Baikiaea woodlands to the east. The drier Kalahari xeric savanna lies to the south.

The Angolan mopane woodlands surround the halophytic grasslands of Etosha pan.

== Flora ==
Mopane is the distinctive feature, a single-stemmed tree in some places up to 10 m high and in some places not much more than a shrub. It has butterfly-shaped leaves and grows in dense thickets. In Etosha National Park in Namibia it is by the far the most common species.

== Fauna ==
Fauna include large mammals, many of which can be seen in Etosha National Park. The ecoregion contains elephants, who crash through the mopane trees and feed on their bark and leaves, black rhino, zebra, cheetahs, leopards, lions, and many antelopes. There are four mammals which are almost endemic to the ecoregion: Thomas's rock rat (Aethomys thomasi), heather shrew (Crocidura erica), blackish white-toothed shrew (Crocidura nigricans), and the black-faced impala. The mopane trees are the habitat of the mopane emperor moth (gonimbrasia belina), whose caterpillars feed on the leaves and are collected for food by people in the area. The area is rich in bird life, insects (particularly spiders) and reptiles including four endemic reptiles: Afrogecko ansorgii, Coluber zebrinus, Ruben's sand lizard (Pedioplanis rubens), and the Angolan skaapsteker snake (Psammophylax ocellatus).

== Threats and preservation ==
The woodlands are vulnerable to clearance for agriculture, firewood and timber while the grassland between the trees is being overgrazed. On the Angolan side there are two national parks, Bicauri National Park and Mupa National Park but wildlife in these parks and Cunene Province as a whole has been severely damaged by the Angolan Civil War.

Meanwhile in Namibia a huge game reserve contained a large proportion of this ecoregion until the park was broken up to create land for settlements in the 1960s. Part of the reserve remains protected as Etosha National Park and this includes a large area of mopane woodland but the widespread poaching and uncontrolled hunting which began with the dismantling of the reserve and the Namibian War of Independence still continues in Etosha and other private reserves in Namibia. There have also been outbreaks of anthrax in Etosha National Park. On the positive side firefighting efforts have allowed the park to become more wooded and thus support a larger elephant population.

== Visiting the region ==
The closest town to Etosha National Park is Tsumeb.
