= Angolan miombo woodlands =

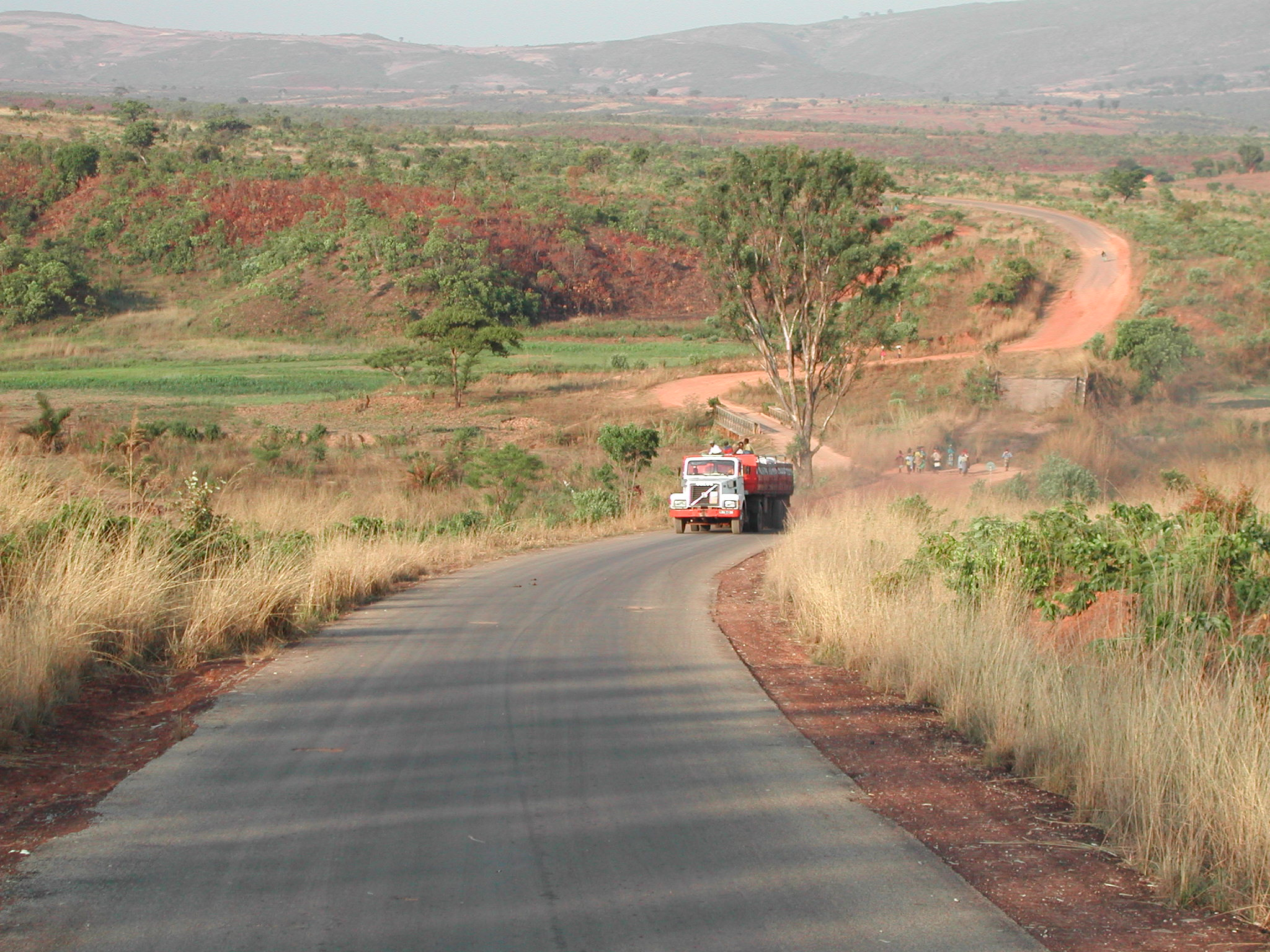
- Near Longonjo, Angola

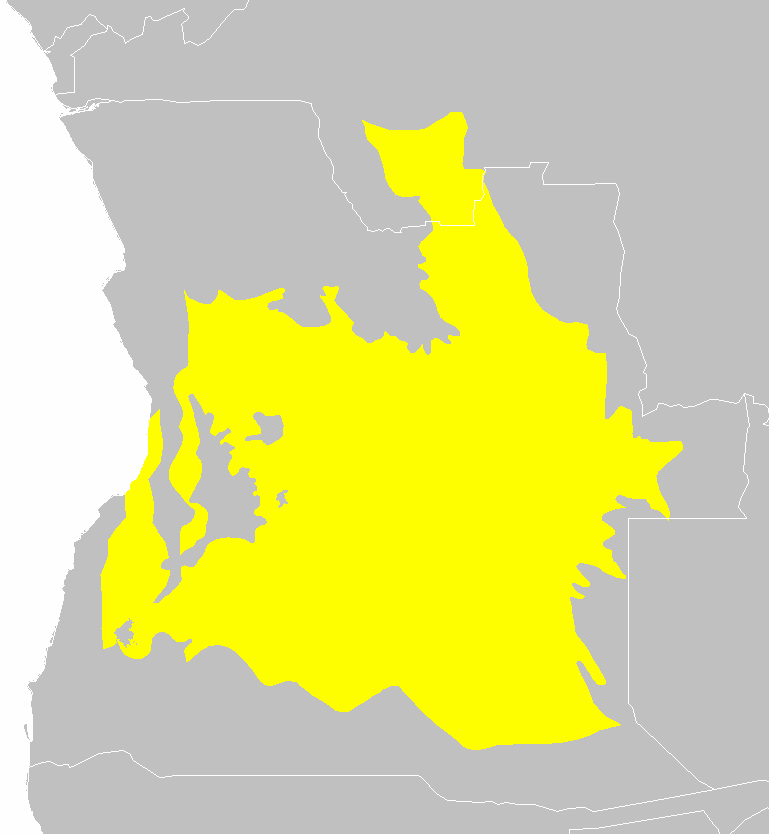
- Map of the Angolan miombo woodlands ecoregion

Ecology
- Realm: Afrotropic
- Biome: Tropical and subtropical grasslands, savannas, and shrublands
- Borders: List: Angolan montane forest–grassland mosaic; Angolan mopane woodlands; Angolan scarp savanna and woodlands; Central Zambezian miombo woodlands; Kaokoveld desert; Namibian savanna woodlands; Southern Congolian forest–savanna mosaic; Western Congolian forest–savanna mosaic; Western Zambezian grasslands; Zambezian Baikiaea woodlands; Zambezian Cryptosepalum dry forests

Geography
- Area: 660,100 km^{2} (254,900 mi^{2})
- Countries: Angola; Democratic Republic of the Congo; Zambia

Conservation
- Conservation status: relatively intact
- Protected: 5.37%

Angolan miombo woodlands cover most of central Angola and extend into the Democratic Republic of Congo. They are part of the larger miombo ecosystem that covers much of eastern and southern Africa.

== Location and description ==
This area of savanna and woodland covers an area of plateau and gentle hills in central Angola, in the Cubango-Zambezi Basin which drains into the Zambezi River to the east. The area lies east of the range of hills that parallel the Atlantic coast and north of the Kalahari Desert reaching up as far as the rainforests of the Congo.

The ecoregion was delineated by David Olson et al. in 2001. In 2017 Dinerstein et al. revised some ecoregion boundaries. They redesigned the ecoregion Angolan wet miombo woodlands, adjusted the western boundary of the ecoregion, and placed the drier miombo woodlands of southeastern Angola into the newly-described dry miombo woodlands ecoregion.

== Climate ==
The Angolian miombo woodlands has a tropical climate, wetter than the surrounding savanna, with most of the rain falling in the hotter summer months (November–March).

== Flora ==
The flora is moist deciduous broadleaf savanna and woodland. Between these areas is open grassland. Three species of tree dominate miombo woodland: Brachystegia, Julbernardia, and Isoberlinia. Under the trees there is a rich variety of other flora while the grassland areas in the region lie on sandy soil. One particular feature of miombo woodland is its vulnerability to fire, as the area is dry most of the year round.

== Fauna ==
Fauna inhabiting the area include a number of bird species and mammals including the giant sable antelope. Endemic mammals include Vernay's climbing mouse (Dendromus vernayi). Large mammals include giraffe (in the wetter areas), bushbuck (Tragelaphus scriptus), blue duiker (Cephalophus monticola) and yellow-backed duiker (C. silvicultor) in the thickly wooded areas and giraffe, sitatunga (Tragelaphus spekei) and waterbuck (Kobus ellipsiprymnus) in the wetter areas, with tsessebe (Damaliscus lunatus) in the grasslands.

Other large mammals found in the ecoregion include hippopotamus (Hippopotamus amphibius), zebra (Equus burchellii), and their predators such as lion (Panthera leo), leopard (P. pardus), cheetah (Acinonyx jubatus), African wild dog (Lycaon pictus), side-striped jackal (Canis adustus) and spotted hyaena (Crocuta crocuta) as well as smaller carnivores such as African wild cat (Felis lybica), serval (Leptailurus serval), caracal (Caracal caracal) and, appropriately the Angolan genet (Genetta angolensis). Before the Angolan Civil War in the 1970s the area was home to large populations of elephants and black rhinoceros but these have almost completely been removed, mainly by poachers. The only known endemic bird species is the black-tailed cisticola (Cisticola melanura) although there is a fairly rich selection of bird life. Following rains the following can be found in the wetlands: greater swamp-warbler (Acrocephalus rufescens), African yellow warbler (Iduna natalensis), chirping cisticola (Cisticola pipiens), Bocage's weaver (Ploceus temporalis), saddle-billed stork (Ephippiorhynchus senegalensis), marabou stork (Leptoptilos crumeniferus), Goliath heron (Ardea goliath), and wattled crane (Bugeranus carunculatus).

Amphibians are less common. They include two endemic frog species, Hildebrandtia ornatissima and Leptopelis anchietae, plus one that is found almost entirely in this region, Hyperolius vilhenai.

Finally, in miombo woodland the many termites and caterpillars play an important role in clearing leaves.

== Urban areas and settlements ==
Towns and cities in the region include Kuito, Menongue and Luena, all areas that saw much conflict during the 1975-2002 Angolan Civil War.

== Threats and protected areas ==
The intense and long-lasting Angolan Civil War from 1975 to 2002 caused immense damage to this environment, leaving the forests exposed to poaching and uncontrolled clearance, and conservation became a low priority for the government. The conflict also prevented proper study of the region by scientists. However the woodland is not threatened by clearance for agriculture or logging as along with the effects of war there are other factors keeping the population of the region to a minimum; the sandy soil does not sustain agriculture, and the woods and grassland are rife with tsetse fly. Some forest is being cleared on the edge of towns or for strip-mining.

There are a number of Angolan national parks in the region. Some had to be abandoned at various times during the civil war due to fighting.

5.37% of the ecoregion is in protected areas. Protected areas in the ecoregion include:

- Bicuar National Park
- Buffalo Partial Reserve
- Cameia National Park
- Cangandala National Park, an important haven for the giant sable antelope (Hippotragus niger variani).
- Luando Integral Nature Reserve
- Longa-Mavinga National Park
- Mupa National Park
- Namibe Partial Reserve
