= Kalahari acacia–baikiaea woodlands =

Ecoregion in Botswana, Namibia, South Africa and Zimbabwe

Kalahari Acacia-Baikiaea woodlands
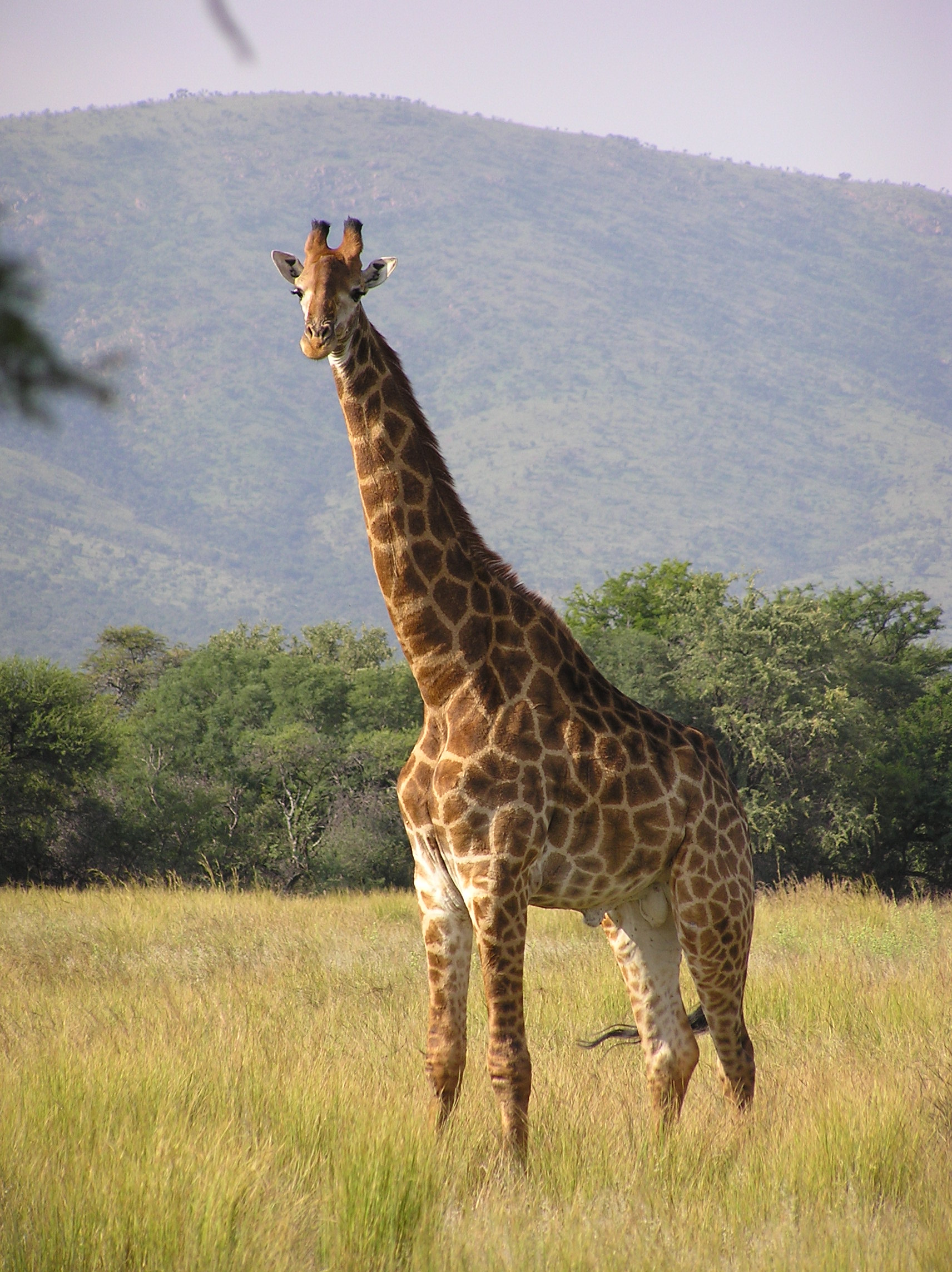
- Giraffe in the Central Kalahari Game Reserve

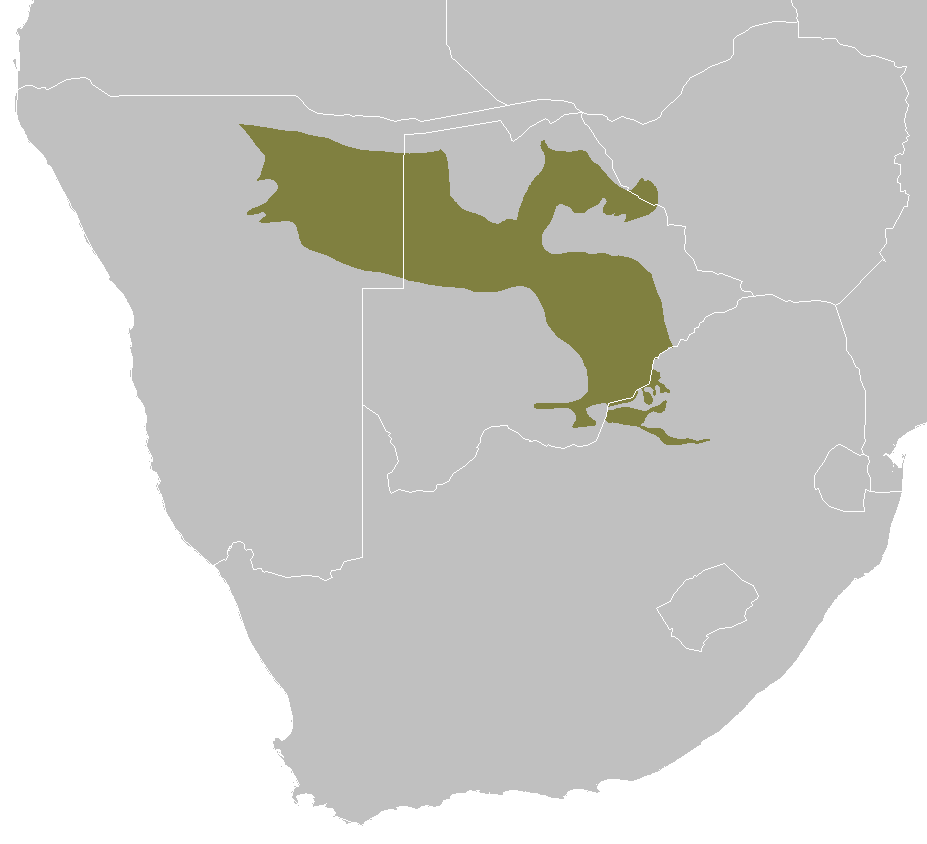
- map of the Kalahari Acacia-Baikiaea woodlands

Ecology
- Realm: Afrotropical
- Biome: Tropical and subtropical grasslands, savannas, and shrublands

Geography
- Area: 335,400 km^{2} (129,500 mi^{2})
- Countries: Botswana, Namibia, South Africa and Zimbabwe

Conservation
- Conservation status: vulnerable

The Kalahari Acacia-Baikiaea woodlands are an ecoregion located in Botswana, northern Namibia, South Africa and Zimbabwe.

== Setting ==
These woodlands cover the center of southern Africa, from northern Namibia diagonally through to southeast Botswana and just into the Tuli Block of South Africa. In Botswana there is another area running north from the Okavango Delta and the Makgadikgadi Pan towards the border of the Chobe National Park and then east to the border with Zimbabwe. All this is semi-arid sandveld with little surface water. Droughts occur approximately every seven years. Rainfall, when it occurs, is mostly in the summer, from October through March.

The Kalahari Acacia-Baikiaea woodlands are bounded on the north by the Zambezian Baikiaea woodlands, and on the east by the Bushveld. The Kalahari xeric savanna lies to the south and west, and the Angolan mopane woodlands to the northwest.

== Flora ==
The flora depends on the availability of water. The northern section to the west of the Okavango Delta and into Namibia has a moister climate and the Baikiaea plurijuga woodland with bush savanna is dominant. In the hardveld areas to the south, the climate becomes more arid and the plants are dominated by xerophytic acacia.

== Fauna ==
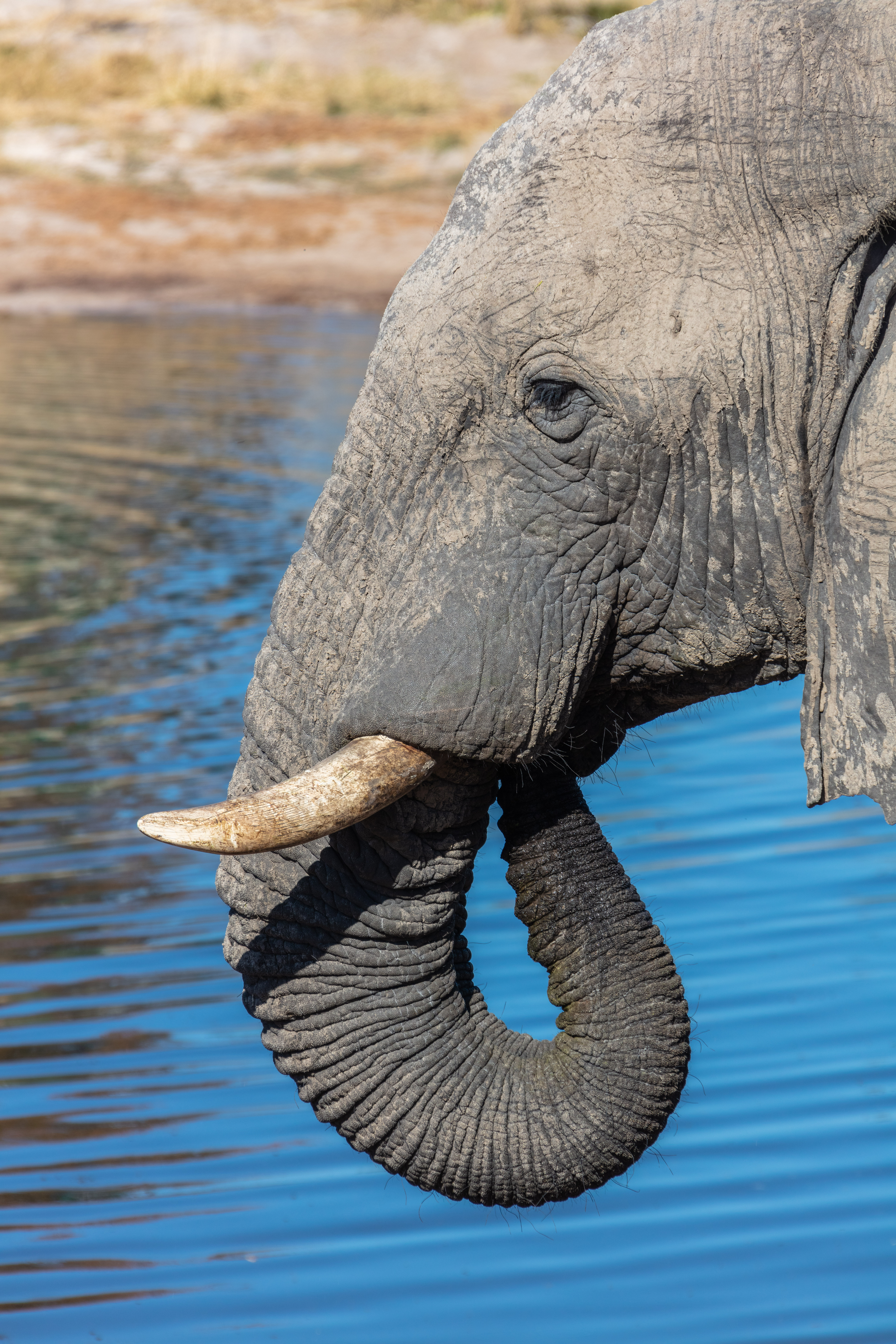
Elephant (Loxodonta africana) in the Kalahari

Fauna includes white and black rhino. Wild dogs and elephant are also notable. Large mammals that migrate through the region include Blue wildebeest (Connochaetes taurinus), eland (Taurotragus oryx), zebra (Equus burchelli), buffalo (Syncerus caffer), and red hartebeest (Alcelaphus buselaphus). The region is rich in birdlife including the endemic Bradfield's hornbill (Tockus bradfieldi).

== Threats and preservation ==
Problems facing the region include the low but growing human population and the increased cattle ranching. The annual movement of the large herbivores are now stopped by veterinary control fences aimed at foot-and-mouth disease in cattle, with devastating effects on their ability to move to water sources in times of drought. Commercial hunting is a major element of tourism in the region but illegal hunting presents the main threat to wildlife. Protected areas within the region include Central Kalahari Game Reserve in Botswana, Khaudom National Park in Namibia, and Nxai Pan National Park, but there is little protection in the hardveld area to the south of the ecoregion.

The diamond mine at Orapa is in the centre of the region but does not present a threat to wildlife.
