= Hyperolius vilhenai =

Conservation status
- Data Deficient (IUCN 3.1)

Scientific classification
- Kingdom: Animalia
- Phylum: Chordata
- Class: Amphibia
- Order: Anura
- Family: Hyperoliidae
- Genus: Hyperolius
- Species: H. vilhenai

Binomial name
- Hyperolius vilhenai Laurent, 1964

Species of frog

Hyperolius vilhenai is a species of frog in the family Hyperoliidae. It is only known from its type locality, Cuílo, along the Luita River in northern Angola, although it is likely to occur in adjacent Democratic Republic of the Congo. Additional specimens from the Cangandala National Park have been provisionally assigned to this species. The specific name vilhenai honours Ernesto Jardim de Vilhena, a Portuguese naval officer, politician, and businessman. Common names Luita River reed frog and Vilhena's reed frog have been proposed for this frog.

== Description ==
The holotype, an adult male, measures 21 mm (0.8 in) in snout–vent length. It has a squat body and a large, broad head. The snout is rounded. Colouration is pale green. A dark band runs from tip of snout to upper eyelid. The specimen has neither gular flap not gular sac. It is the only specimen assigned to this species with confidence.

== Habitat and conservation ==
Hyperolius vilhenai was apparently found in gallery forest in the humid savanna zone. Its ecoregion of occurrence is the Angolan miombo woodlands. Information on threats to this species is lacking. It might be present in the Cangandala National Park.
