= Mupa National Park =

National park in Angola

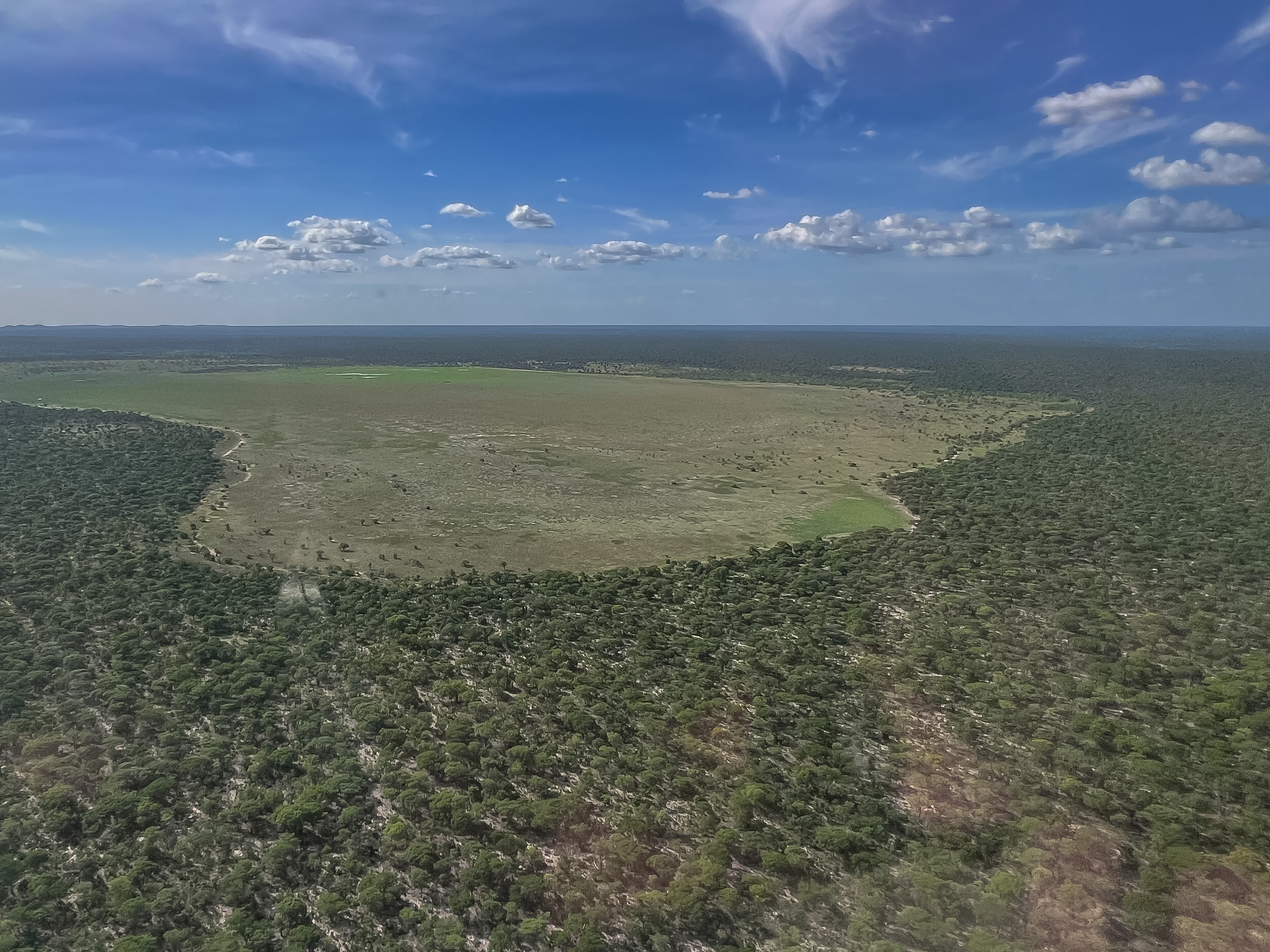
- Mupa National Park region

- Location within Angola
- Location: Angola
- Coordinates: 15°55′S 15°35′E
- Area: 6,600 km^{2} (2,500 sq mi)
- Established: 1964

Mupa National Park is a national park in Angola's Cunene province and covers an area of 6600 square kilometers. It was proclaimed a national park on 26 December 1964 while Angola was a Portuguese territory.

It is significant for its expected wide (though generally unstudied) variety of avifauna. Many Angolans reside within the park, which, along with nomadic pastoralists and mineral prospecting threatens to destroy the park's birdlife. According to one article, "Even though the park was initially proclaimed to protect the giraffe subspecies, Giraffa camelopardalis angolensis, by 1974 none were left. Other mammals which occur, include lion, leopard, wild dog and spotted hyena".

About 18,000 people live in the park and are mainly engaged in agriculture and cattle breeding.
