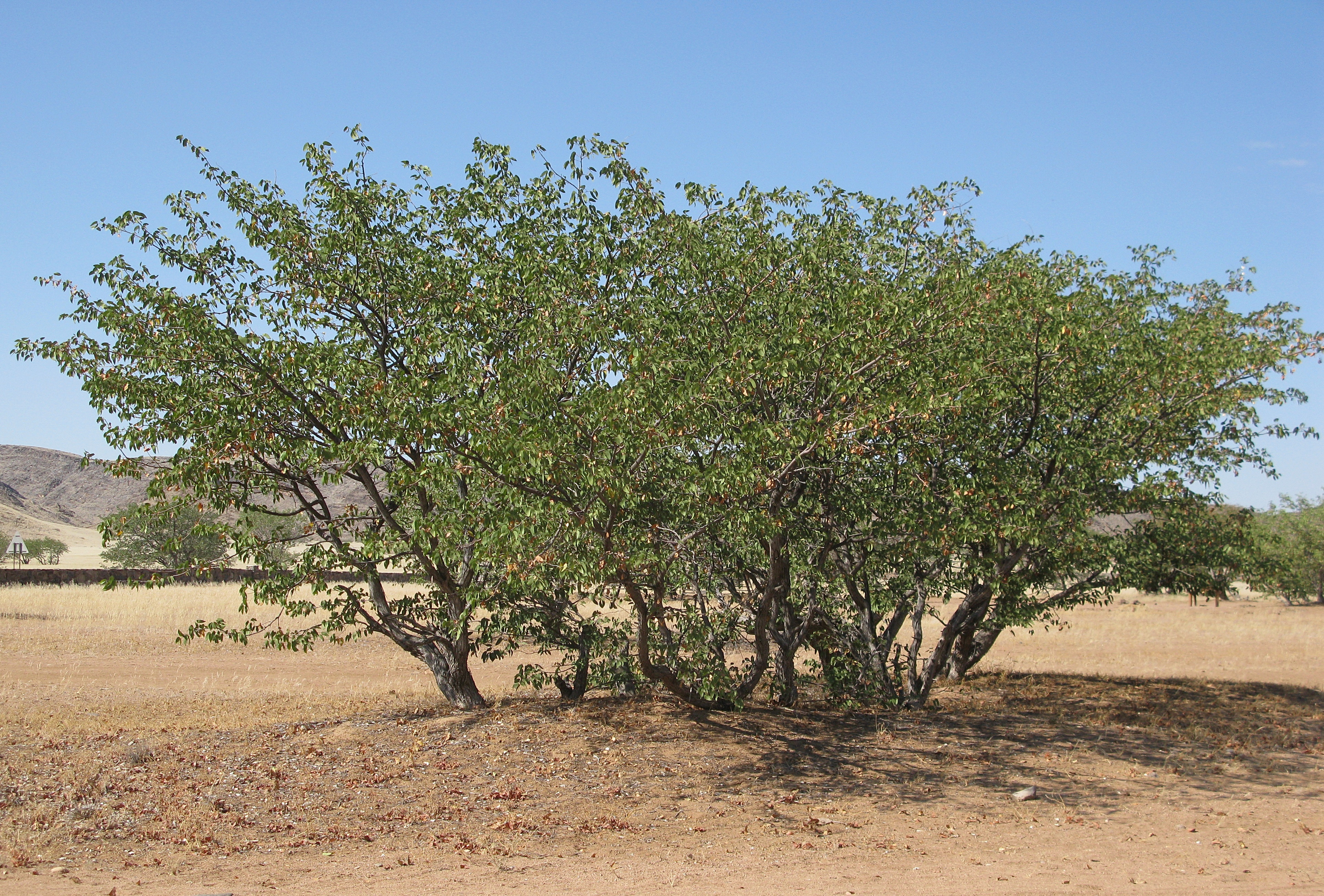

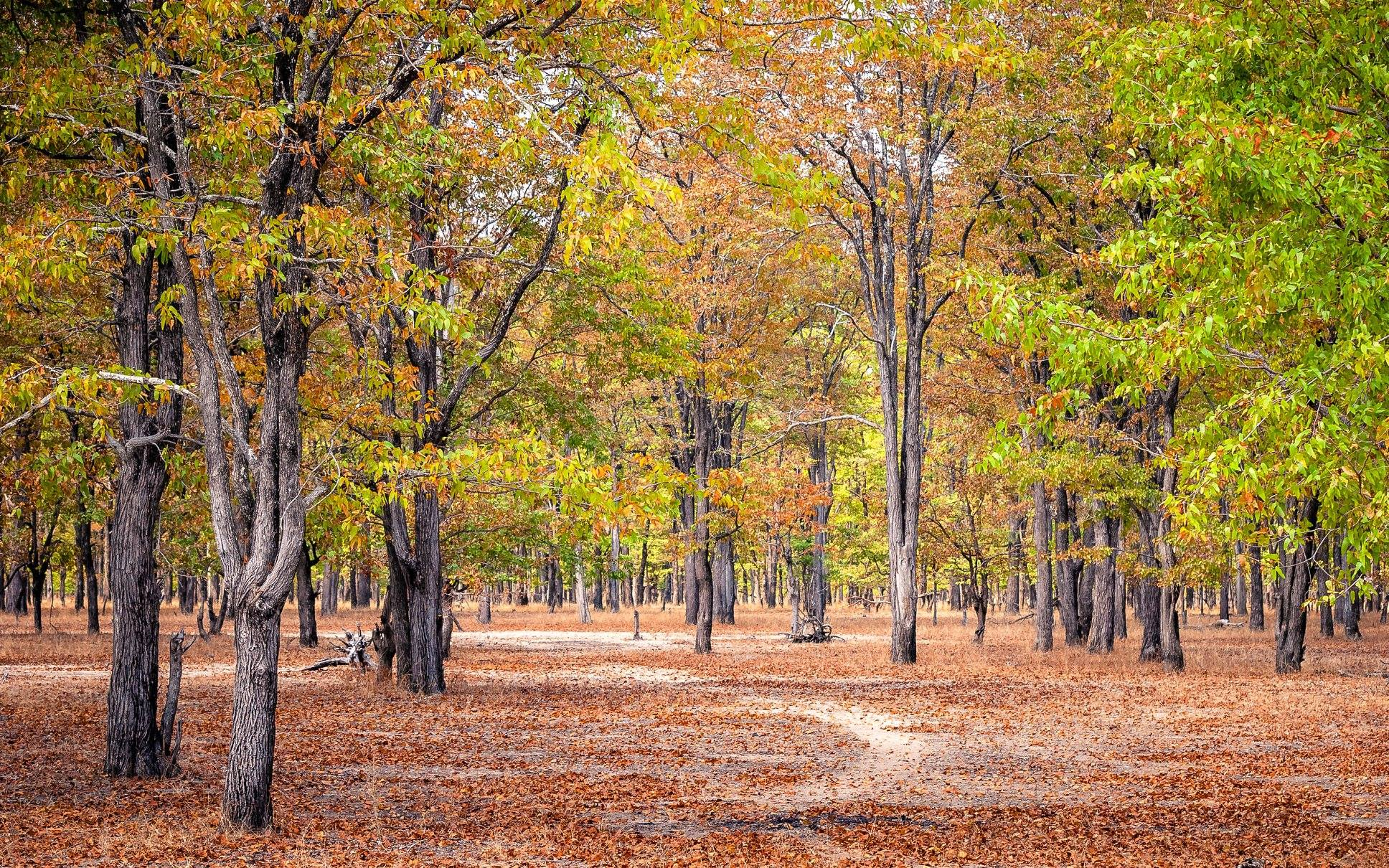
- Multi-stemmed shrub and tall woodland in Namibia and Malawi respectively

Scientific classification
- Kingdom: Plantae
- Clade: Tracheophytes
- Clade: Angiosperms
- Clade: Eudicots
- Clade: Rosids
- Order: Fabales
- Family: Fabaceae
- Subfamily: Detarioideae
- Tribe: Detarieae
- Genus: Colophospermum; J.Léonard (1949), nom. cons.
- Species: C. mopane

Binomial name
- Colophospermum mopane (J.Kirk ex Benth.) J.Léonard (1949)
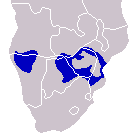

Synonyms
- Copaiba mopane (J.Kirk ex Benth.) Kuntze (1891); Copaifera mopane J.Kirk ex Benth. (1865).; Hardwickia mopane (J.Kirk ex Benth.) Breteler (1997)

= Mopane =

Genus of legumes

Colophospermum mopane, commonly called mopane, mopani, butterfly tree, turpentine tree, or balsam tree, is a tree in the legume family (Fabaceae), that grows in hot, dry, low-lying areas, 200 to 1,200 metres (660 to 3,940 ft) in elevation, in parts of Southern Africa. The tree only occurs in Africa and is the only species in genus Colophospermum. Its distinctive butterfly-shaped (bifoliate) leaf and thin kidney-shaped/nearly semi-circular seed pod make it easy to identify.

Though hard and dense and difficult to work with, it is valued timber in all sorts of construction due to its termite tolerance. (Note: Seely [et al.](1992), p. 33 apud Hangula (1998), p. 13) Together with camel thorn and leadwood, it is one of the three regionally important firewood trees, due to the enduring heat, and these woods are also some of the preferred use culinarily for braai.

== Range and habitat ==
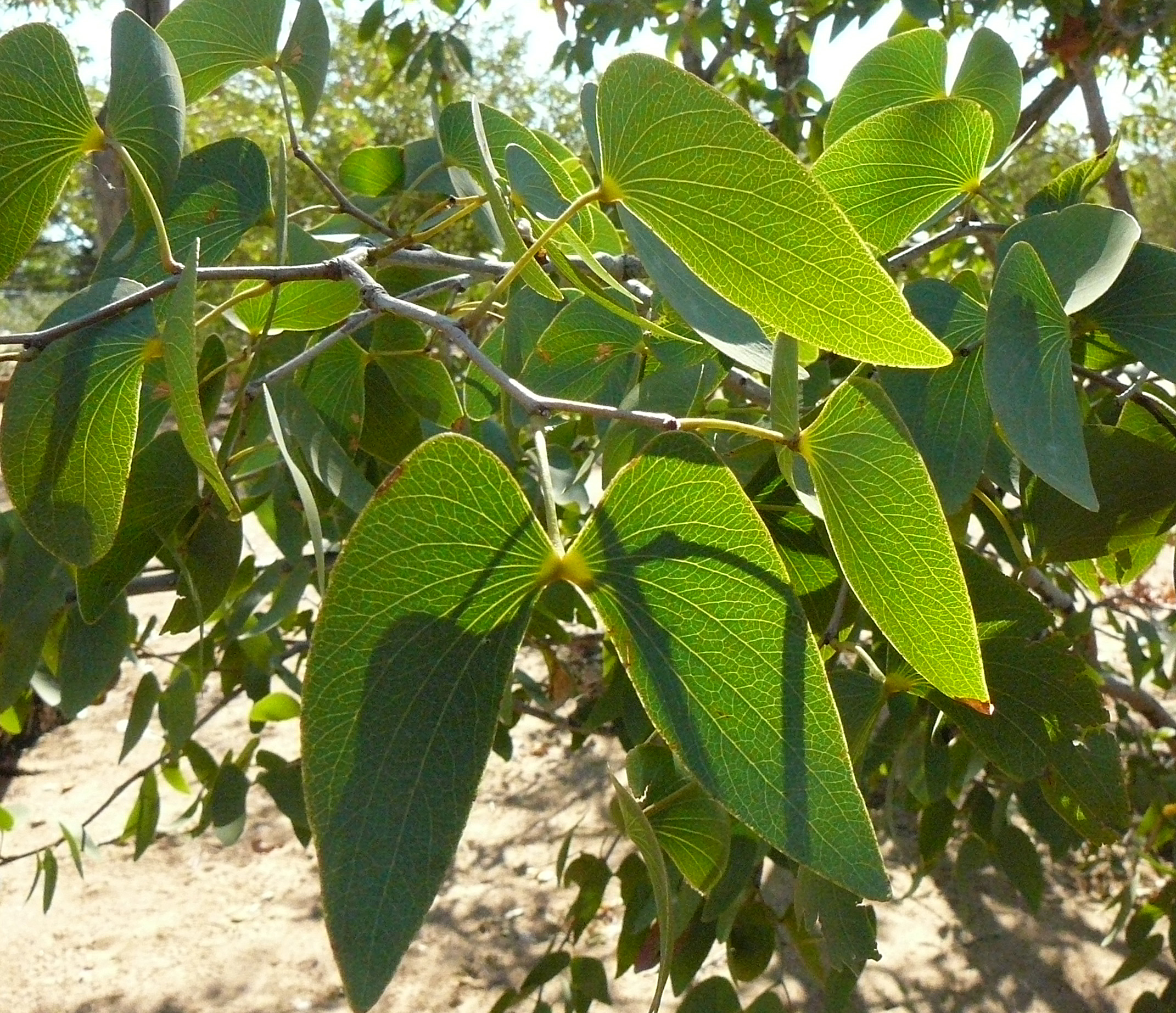
The two papilionaceous leaflets are mirror images of one another, and are borne on a common petiole.

The mopane is found on low-lying ground from 200 metres (660 ft) (Mozambique) to 1,200 metres (3,900 ft) (Zimbabwe). (Note: Another quote gives upper limit of 1000m (–1300m).)

=== Mopane ecoregions ===
Native to Southern Africa, its habitat is divided crudely into two regions: the "Angola region", i.e., Angolan mopane woodlands ecoregion, which includes Southern Angola and northwestern Namibia, and the "Zambezian region", i.e. the Zambezian and mopane woodlands ecoregion extending over the lowlands of the Zambezi River and its tributaries across the countries of Zambia, Southern Malawi, other parts of Namibia, Botswana, Zimbabwe, Mozambique, Eswatini/Swaziland and northern South Africa.

=== Soil and morphology ===
While it prefers slightly acidic deep clay soil that are friable and permeable, it also grows in alkaline (high lime content) soils which are shallow and not well drained. It also grows in alluvial soils (soil deposited by rivers). Where it occurs, it is often the dominant tree species, frequently forming homogeneous stands. (Note: Shorrocks & Bates (2015): "The [southern African] 'tree and shrub' savannahs are characterised by the dominance of the mopane tree."; "Here [in the Zambezian region] the mopane tree is frequently the sole canopy species..")

Within the Zambezian region described above, the trees' height varying considerably, and larger, single-stemmed trees of 10 to 15 m (33 to 49 ft) are found in open savannah woodlands on the (sandy) alluvial soil, forming canopy woodlands, and even reaching 18m in height for the so-called "cathedral mopane" of Zambia. The same tree is also found stunted as (multi-stemmed) shrubbery about 1 to 2 or 3 m (3.3 to 6.6 or 9.8 ft) in clayey soil (Note: Thomas & Shaw (1991), citing Wellington (1955).) or impermeable alkaline soil. Thus water or drainage seems to be a cause factor for stunting, though other causes have been hypothesized. These stunted growths are sometimes called "mopane scrub" (for shrub). The shrubs will not transition into tall woods.

This tree will not grow well outside hot, mostly frost-free areas (Note: Though it can survive light frost.) with low to moderate rainfall (as low as 100mm per year, or averaging 400–500mm per year). (Note: Rainfall over 800 mm will limit its growth.)

== Uses ==
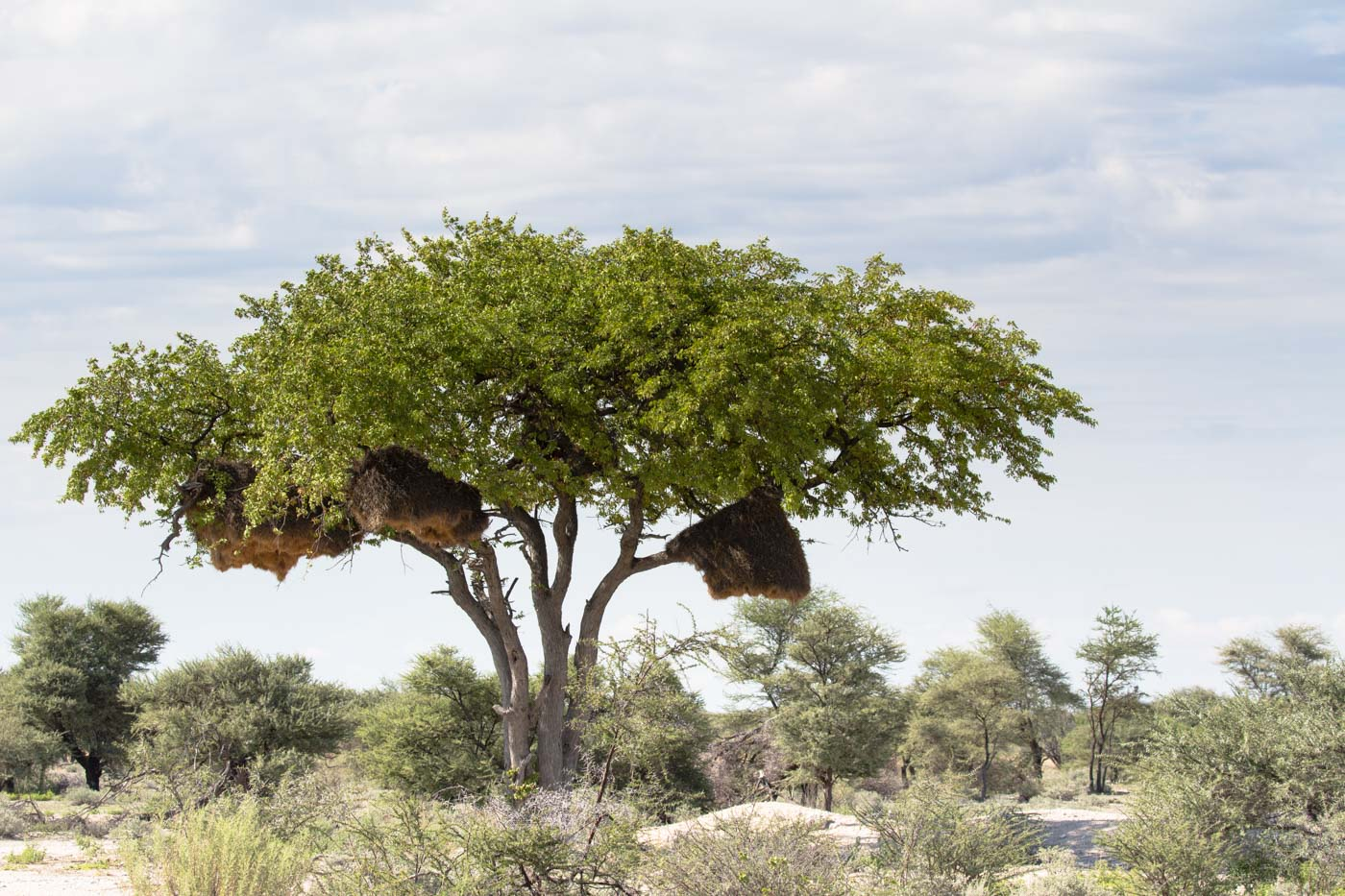

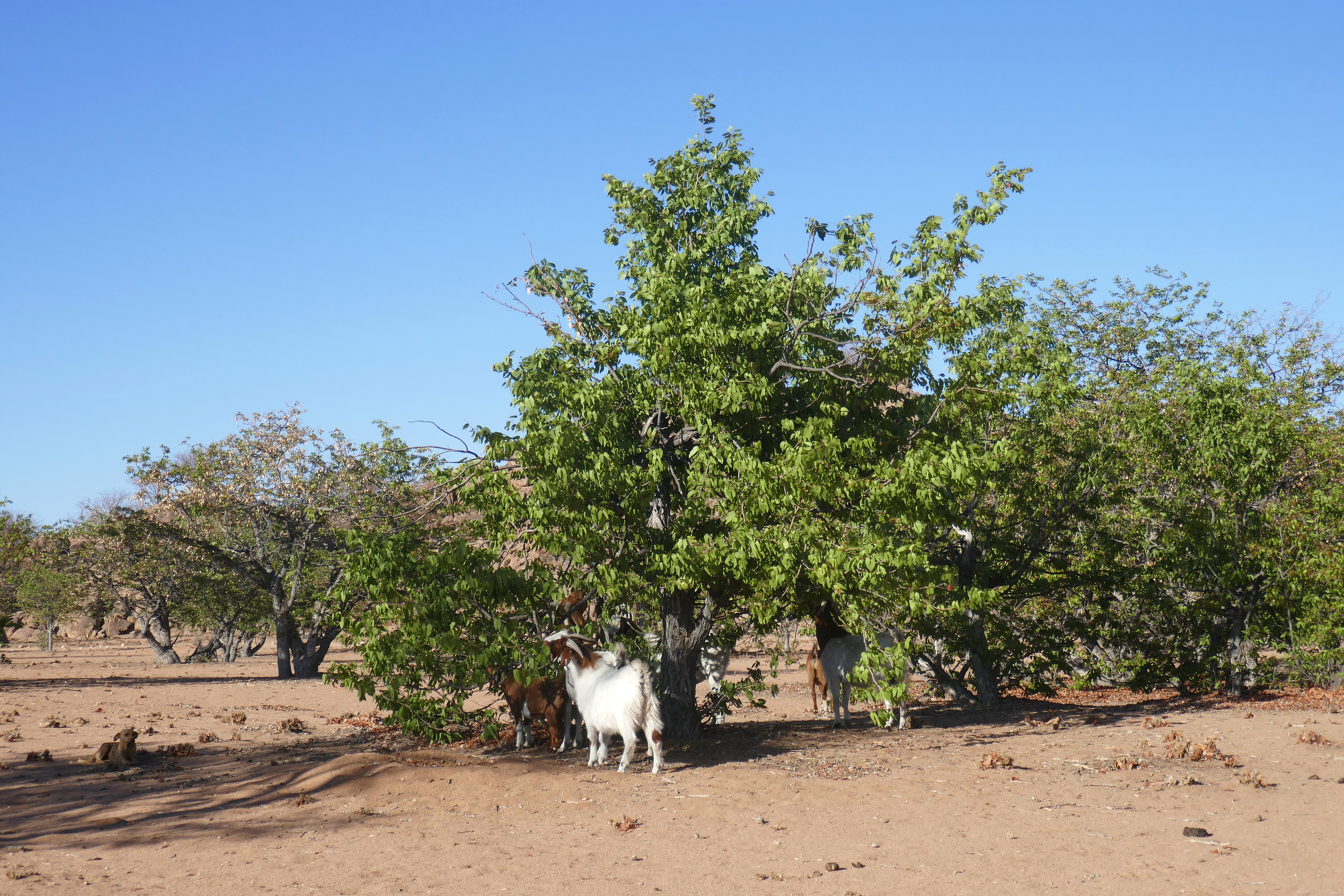
A large multi-stemmed tree with sociable weaver nests, and a shrub browsed on by goats, both in Namibia

Mopane wood is one of southern Africa's heaviest, with an average density range of 0.990 to 1.230 g/cm^{3} (61.8 to 76.8 lb/cu ft) at 12% moisture. (Note: Various sources quote various figures. Meier's Wood Database gives "average dried weight" as 1075 kg/m^{3} or 67.11 lb/cu.ft., close to the lower end of the range. A different source gives 1,200 kg/m^{3}, citing Goldsmith & Carter (1981). which is about 75 lb./cu. ft., which (after rounding down) matches the "76 (73–84) lb./cu. ft" air dry quoted elsewhere, and these are close to the high end of the range.) and is difficult to work because of its hardness. However it is also termite resistant making it one of the most preferred local timbers for construction, and for this reason it has long been used for building houses and fences, as railway sleepers and as pit props. The termite-resistance and rich, reddish colouring also make it popular for parquet flooring. Outside Africa, mopane is gaining popularity as a heavy, decorative wood, its uses including aquarium bogwood ornaments, similarly as driftwood decor for terrariums or gardens, or bases for lamps or sculptures.

It is also increasingly being used in the construction of musical instruments, particularly woodwind. Suitable quality African blackwood (Dalbergia melanoxylon), traditionally used for clarinets, is becoming harder to find. Mopane is fairly oily, seasons very well with few splits or shakes, and produces instruments of a warm, rich tone. Clarinets made of mopane are offered by the manufacturers Schwenk & Seggelke, Wurlitzer, F. Arthur Uebel and Buffet Crampon.

Mopane twigs been traditionally used as a sort of tooth brush (chewing stick to clean teeth), and the leaves for folk remedy in healing the wound after ritual extraction of teeth. (Note: Malan & Owen-Smith (1974) apud van_Wyck&Gericke (2000) Also re-cited by Cheikhyoussef et al. (2023).) Various parts of the tree (seed, leaf, bark, root) are used in the traditional medicine of Southern African for a wide range of symptoms.

The bark to make twine or rope (Note: Palmer and Pitman (1972) apud Cheikhyoussef et al. (2023).) and for tanning leather, (Note: Watt and Breyer-Brandwijk (1962).) The wood is also used to make charcoal (Note: Chidumayo (2000) apud Cheikhyoussef et al. (2023).) and for braai wood.

=== Food source ===
The tree is a major food source for the mopane worm, the caterpillar of the moth Gonimbrasia belina. The caterpillars are rich in protein and are eaten by people. The mopane worm is rich in crude fats and contains vitamins and minerals, such as iron, calcium and phosphorus. Another edible caterpillar is that of Gynanisa maja (speckled emperor moth; chipumi in Bemba (Note: kawanatengo in Kibembe.)) which also uses mopane as host tree.

And when infested with the "mopane fly" or "mopane psyllid" (Retroacizzia mopani syn. Arytaina mopani (Note: Spelt "Arytaina mopane".) ) that feeds on the tree, the tree produces edible wax-like gums on its leaves called "mopane manna" which are collected and eaten by humans and monkeys.

The tree also acts as a foodplant for the wild silk moth, Gonometa rufobrunnea. Cocoons of the moth are harvested as wild silk, to make cloth.

The Mopane worm creates employment and serves as a source of income for the majority of rural women. Harvesters sell it in villages, towns or to the trader.

The tree is also considered an important food resource for animal husbandry (goat herding), as goats can be allowed to browse on the tree's leaves (cf. fig. above). They are also browsed by cattle and by game animals such as elephants, giraffes, water buffalos and antelopes in game farms and nature reserves.

== Etymology ==
The genus name Colophospermum is a compound from Greek kolophon[ios] (Note: Quattrocchi lists kolophonios, kolophonion, kolophonia as "of or from Colophon". Jackson notes Colophon producing rosin too, but additionally glosses kolophon literally as "summit, end".) "resin" + Latin spermum "seed". The former derives from Colophon", which was the birthplace of Homer in Ionia, famous for its rosin, and is a reference to the seed's aromatic (turpentine-smelling) component.

The species name mopane is from its common name in Bantu languages for the tree throughout most of its range. Thus the nomenclature, starting with areas in or around South Africa are: mohlanare, mopane in Northern Sotho/Sepedi (northern Transvaal, current Limpopo province), mophane, mopane in Tsuwana (western Transvaal, northern Cape, Botswana) but nxanatsi in Tsonga (eastern Transvaal). It is known as mopane, tsanya in Chichewa (Malawi), mopani, mupane in Lozi (fmr. Barotseland, western Zambia), mupanyi in Thimbukushu (Namibia), omutati in Herero (Namibia, Botswana), omufiadi in Ovambo (southern Angola, northern Namibia).

Also spelt mupani, mopani. In Afrikaans it goes by mopanie or mopaniehout "mopanie wood" or terpentynboom "turpentine tree". It is called musharu in Shona (Sabi valley, Zimbabwe), chanate in southern Mozambique, and mutiati in Umbundu (Angola).

== Gallery ==
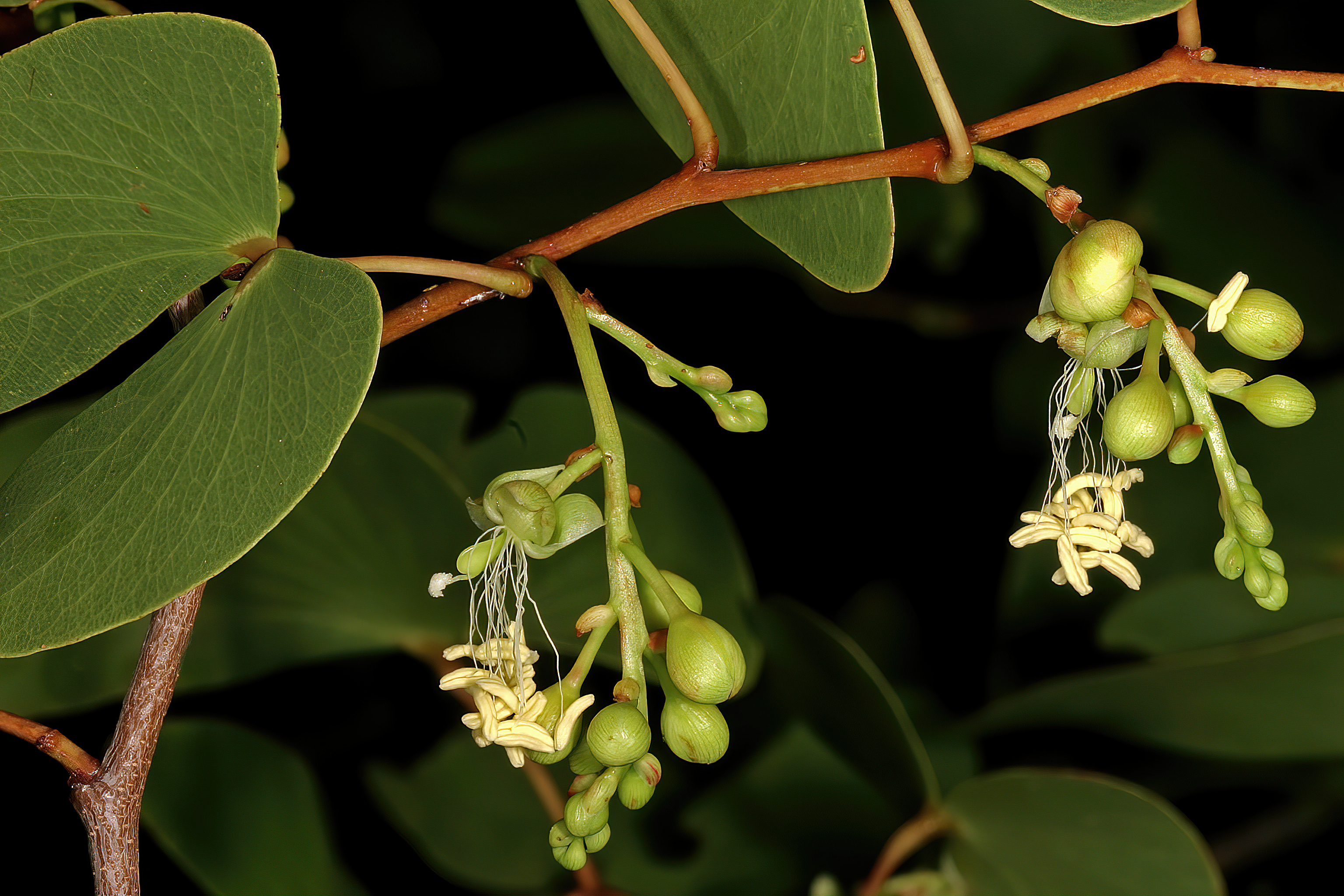
Inflorescences produced during mid-summer

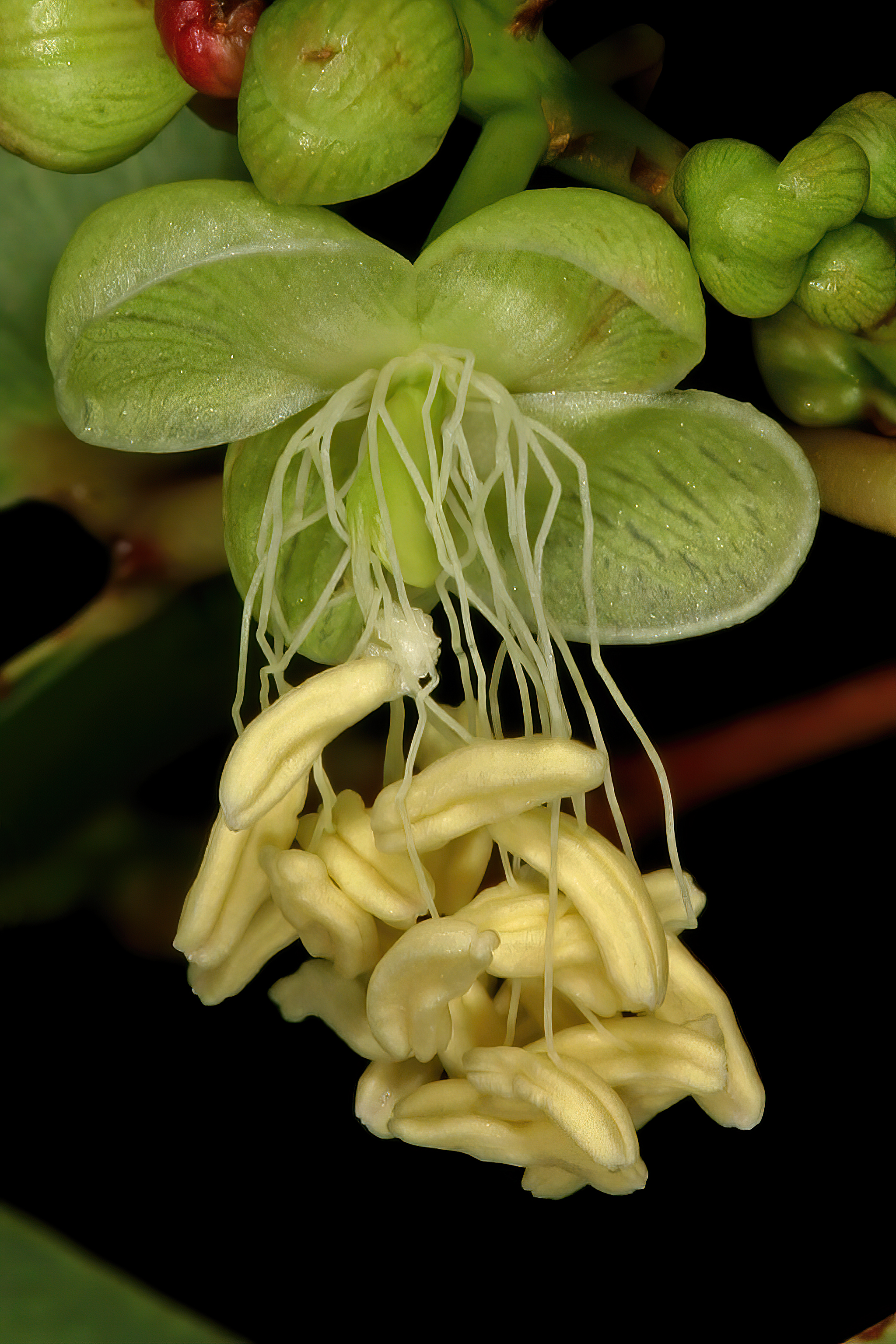
The wind-pollinated flower

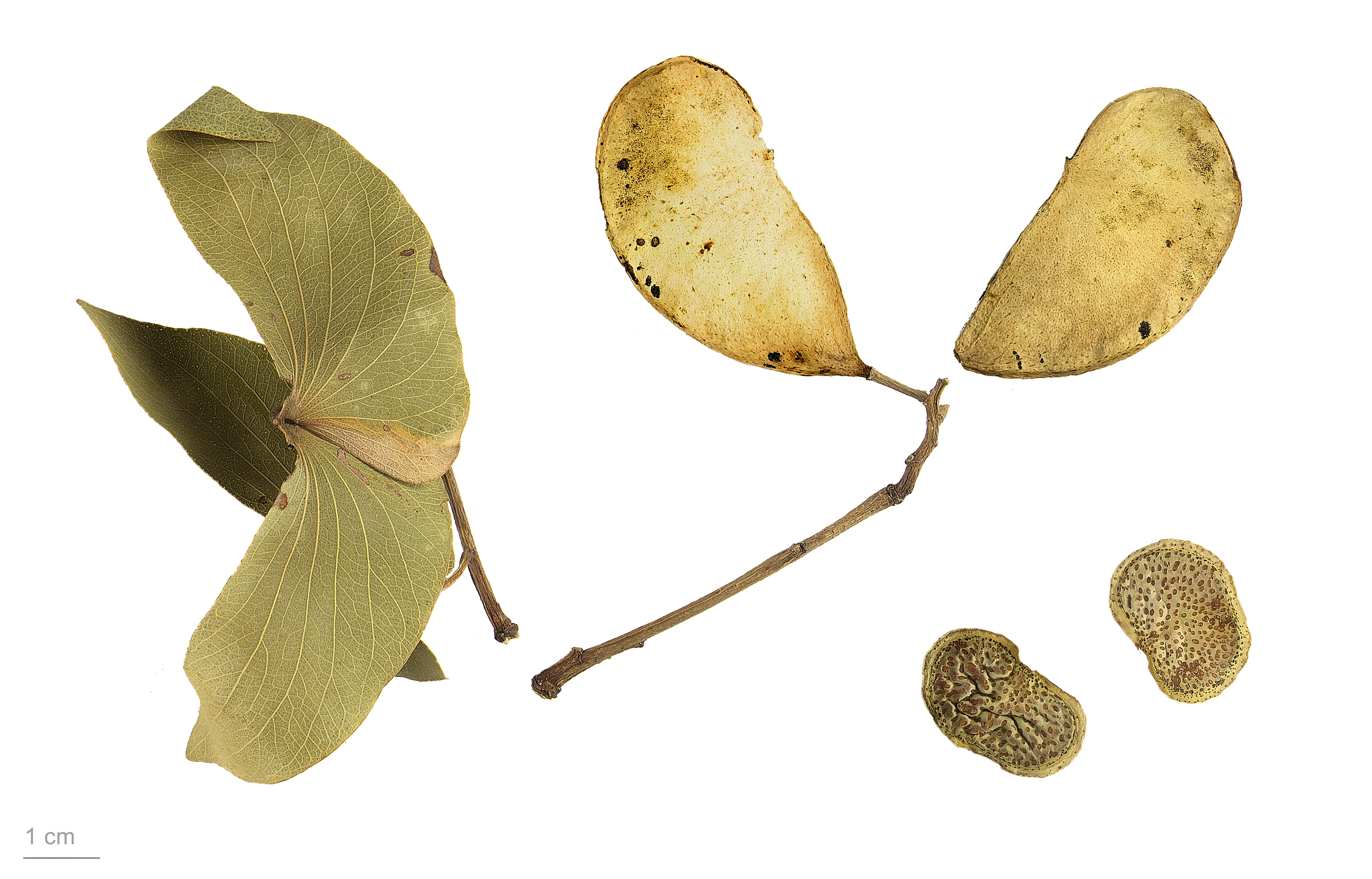
Dry foliage, seed pods and two seeds (bottom right) - MHNT

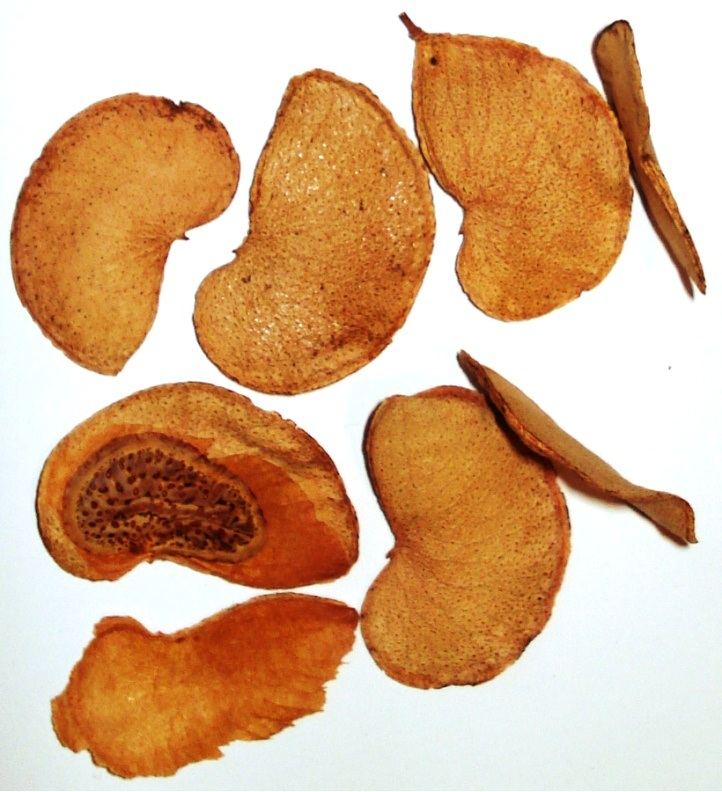
The fruit are pods containing one seed each

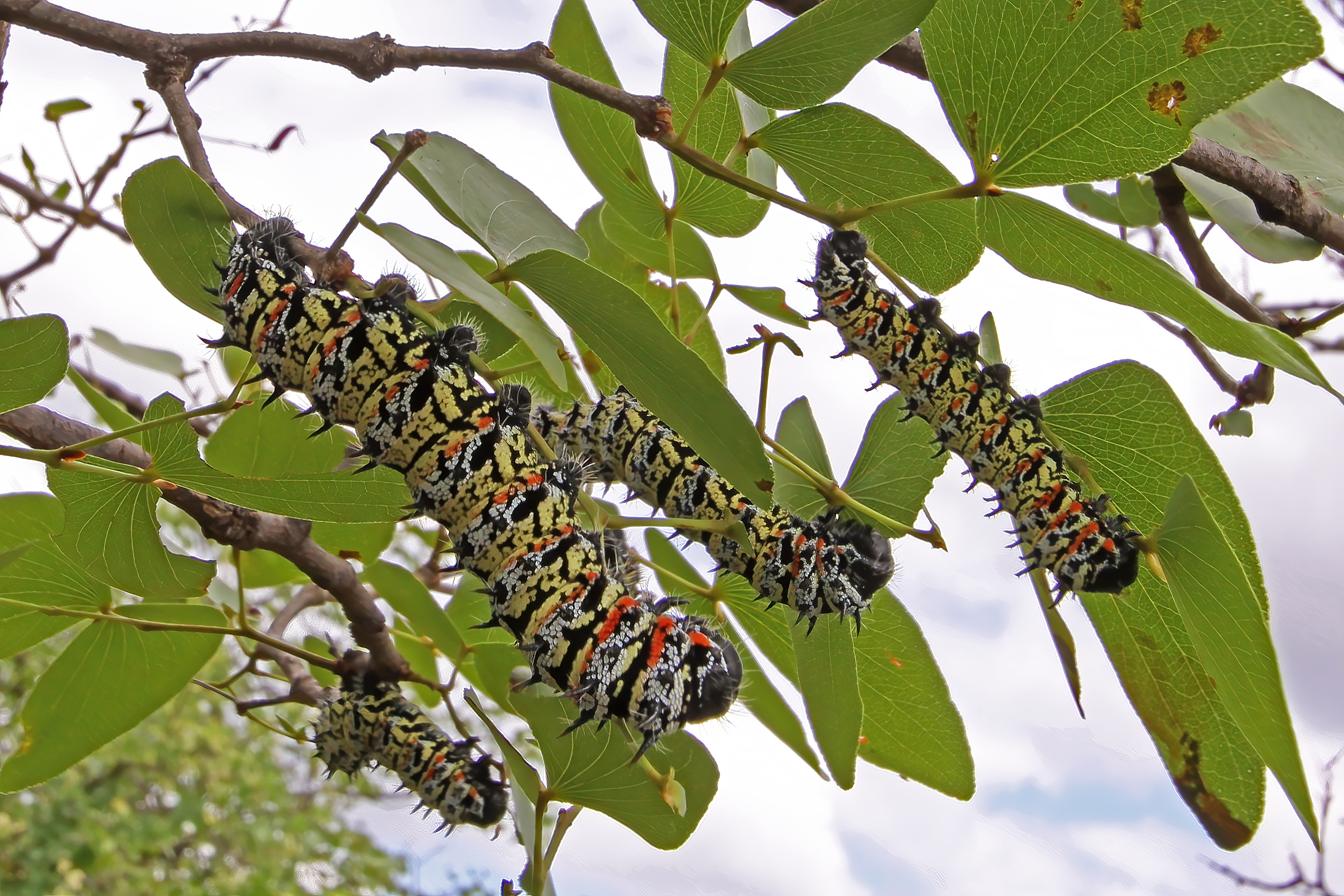
Mopane worms, locally a staple food, consuming the foliage

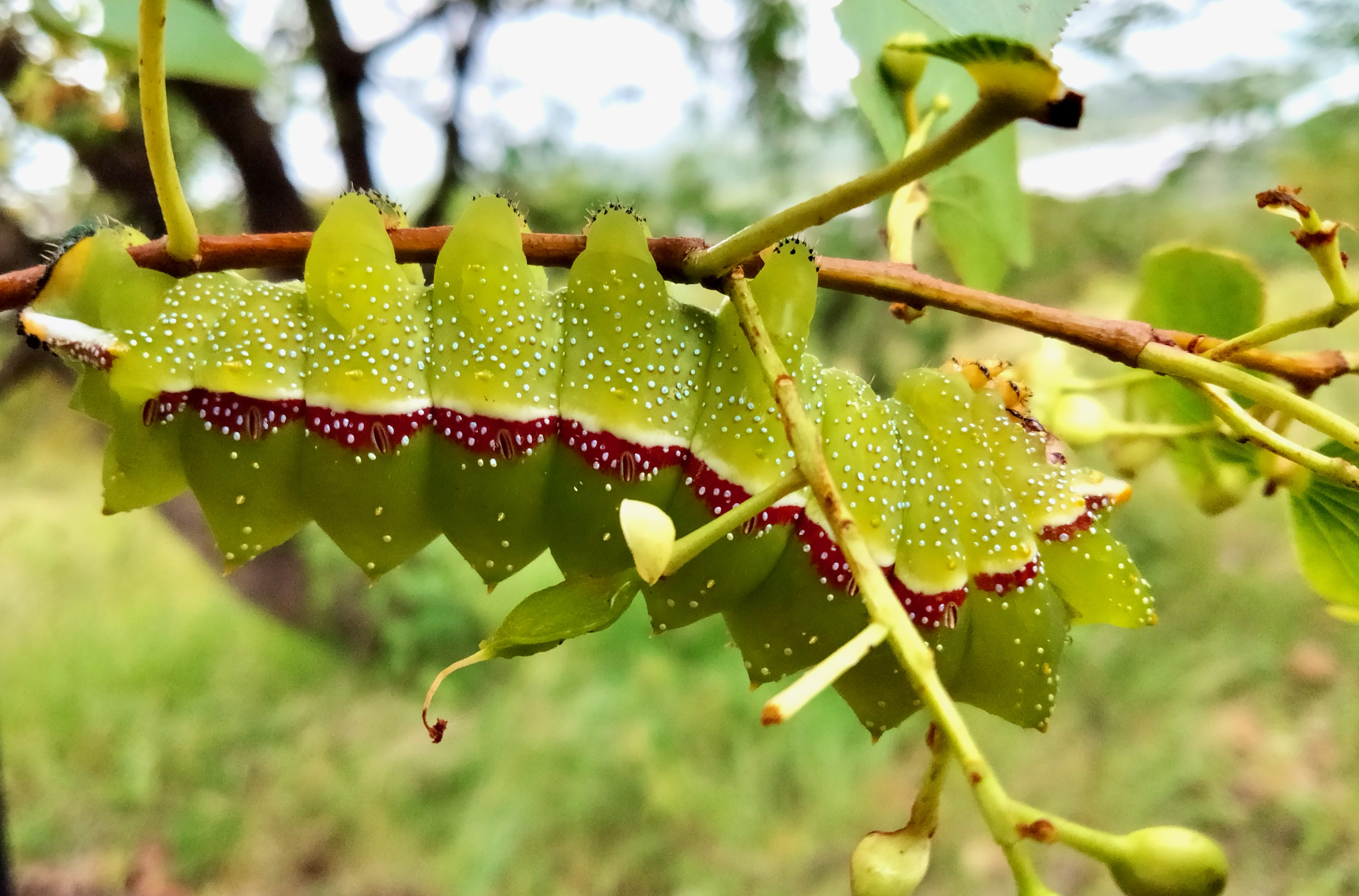
The likewise edible chipumi caterpillar of the speckled emperor moth, defoliating a sprig

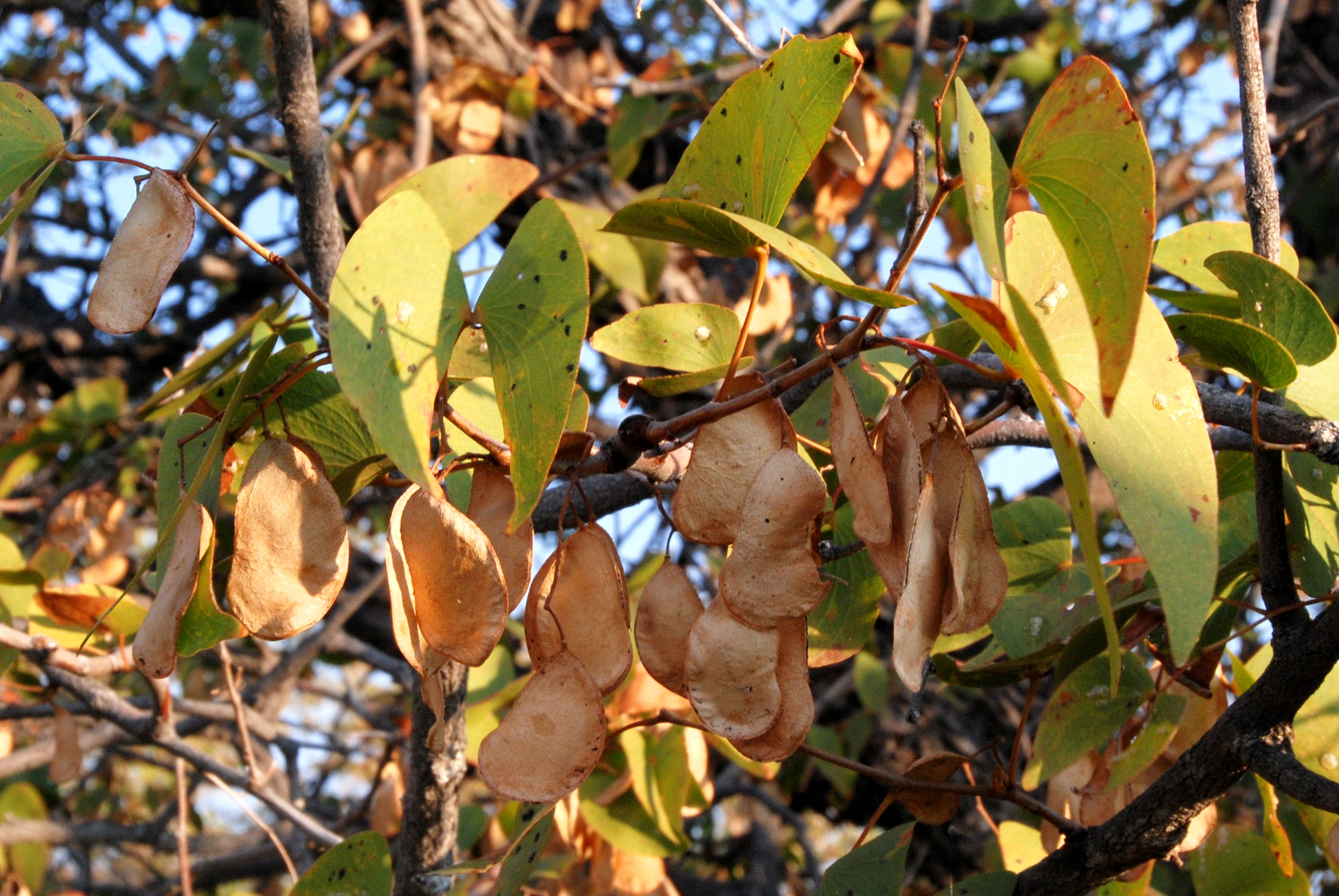
Winter foliage and dry seed pods in Namibia

== See also ==
- List of Southern African indigenous trees
