= Zambezian Baikiaea woodlands =

Ecoregion in Africa

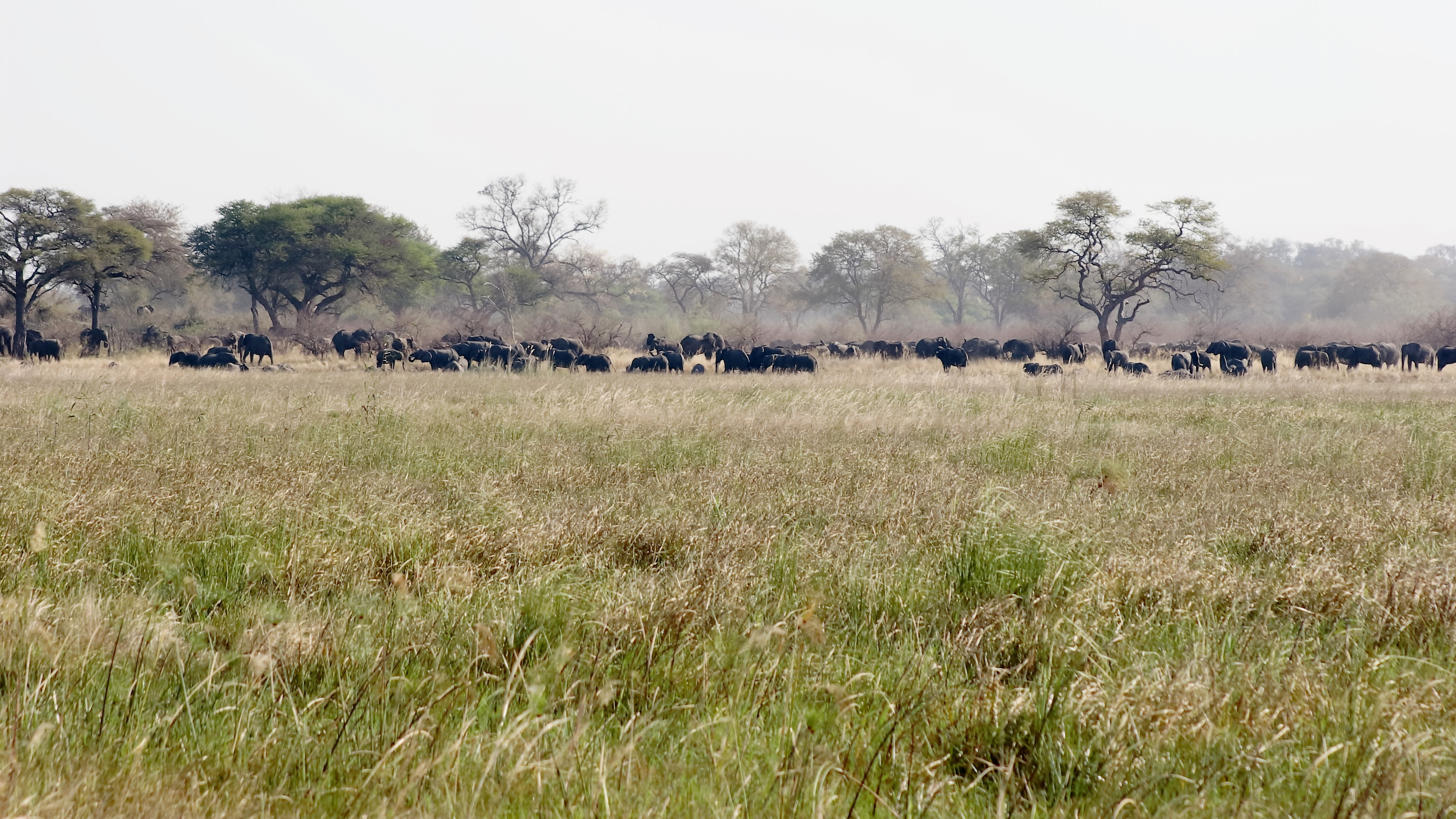
- Elephant herd, Bwabwata National Park, Namibia

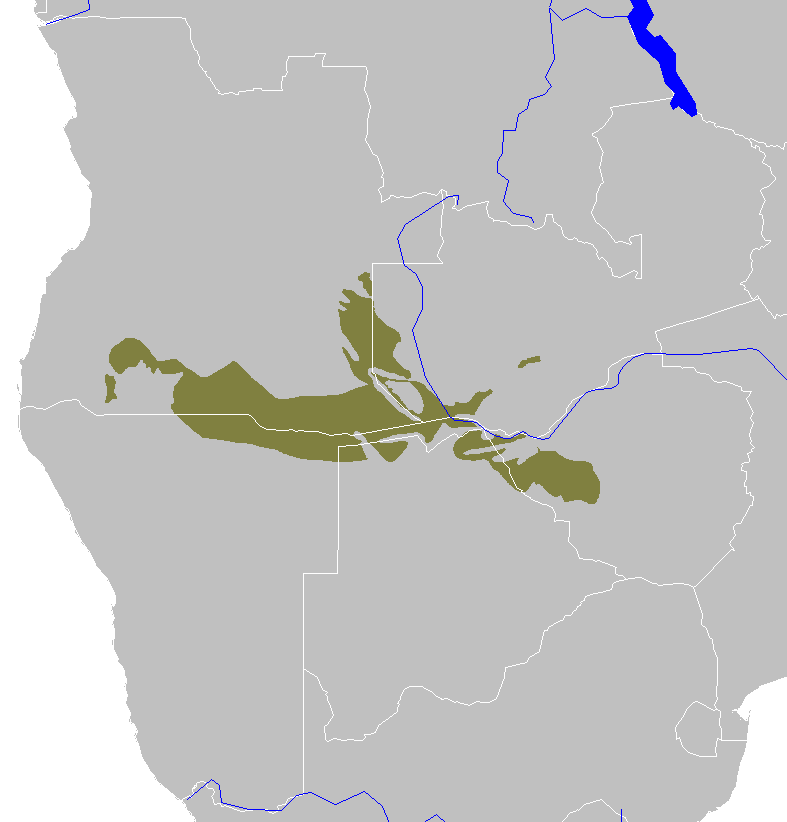
- map of the Zambezian Baikiaea woodlands

Ecology
- Realm: Afrotropic
- Biome: Tropical and subtropical grasslands, savannas, and shrublands

Geography
- Area: 264,400 km^{2} (102,100 mi^{2})
- Countries: Angola, Botswana, Namibia, Zambia, Zimbabwe

Conservation
- Conservation status: vulnerable

The Zambezian Baikiaea woodlands is an ecoregion in Africa. It includes dry deciduous forest and woodland, thicket, and grassland, dominated by the tree Baikiaea plurijuga. The ecoregion has a semi-arid climate, and is a transition between more humid miombo woodlands to the north, and the drier Kalahari Acacia-Baikiaea woodlands to the south.
