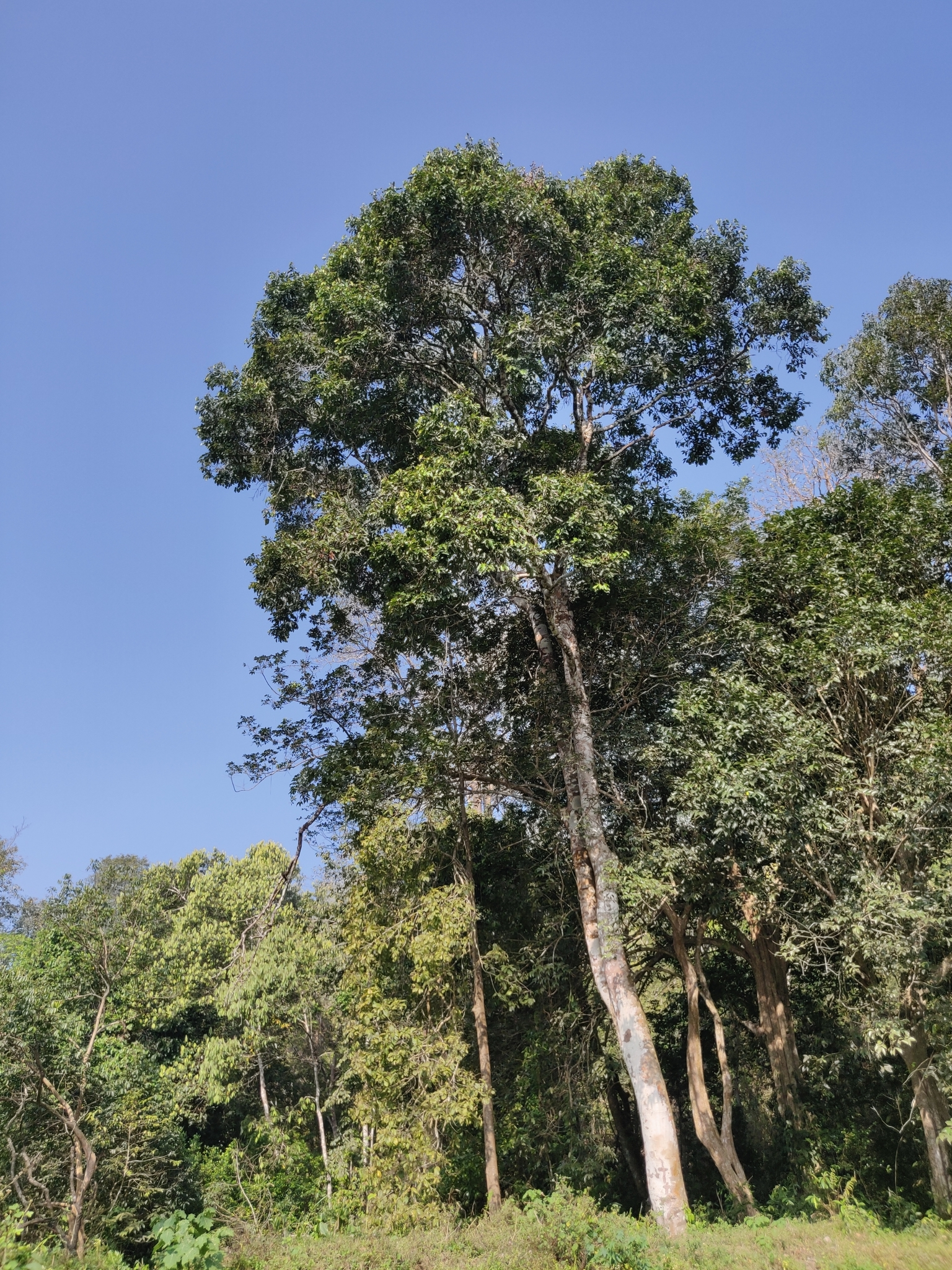
- Vateria indica tree, in the Anamalai Hills
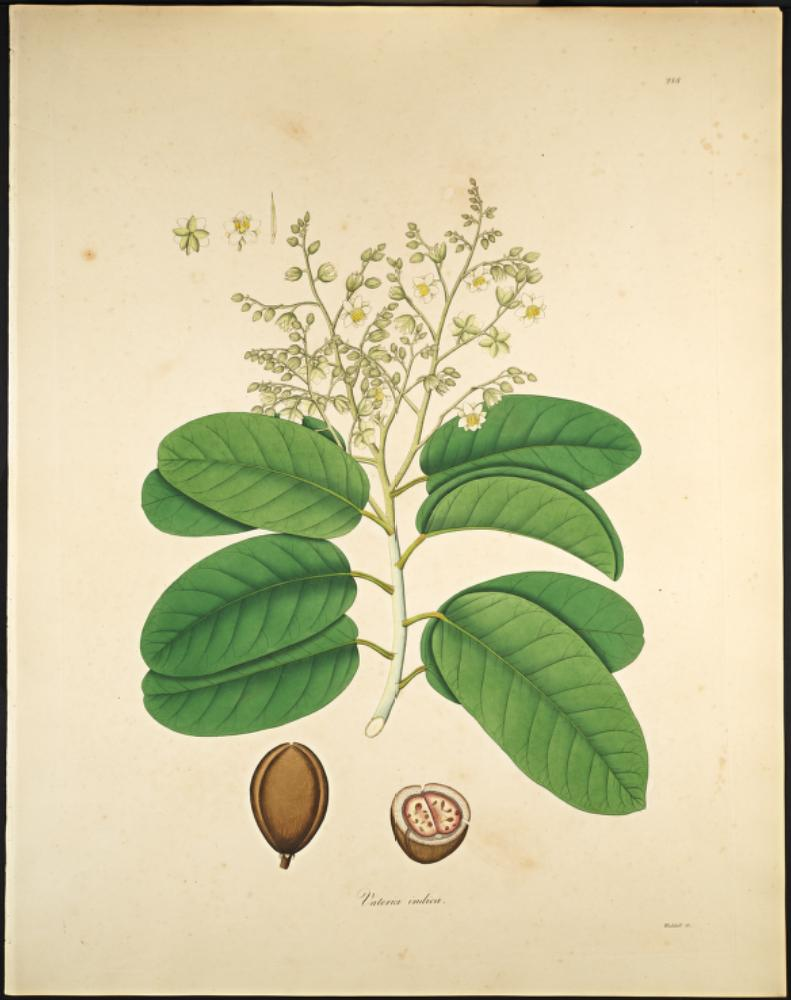
- Vateria indica illustration

Conservation status
- Vulnerable (IUCN 3.1)

Scientific classification
- Kingdom: Plantae
- Clade: Tracheophytes
- Clade: Angiosperms
- Clade: Eudicots
- Clade: Rosids
- Order: Malvales
- Family: Dipterocarpaceae
- Genus: Vateria
- Species: V. indica

Binomial name
- Vateria indica L.

Synonyms
- Vateria malabarica Blume

= Vateria indica =

Species of tree

Vateria indica, the white dammar, is a species of tree in the family Dipterocarpaceae. It is endemic to the Western Ghats mountains in India. It is threatened by habitat loss. It is a large canopy or emergent tree frequent in tropical wet evergreen forests of the low and mid-elevations (below 1200 m).

== Description ==
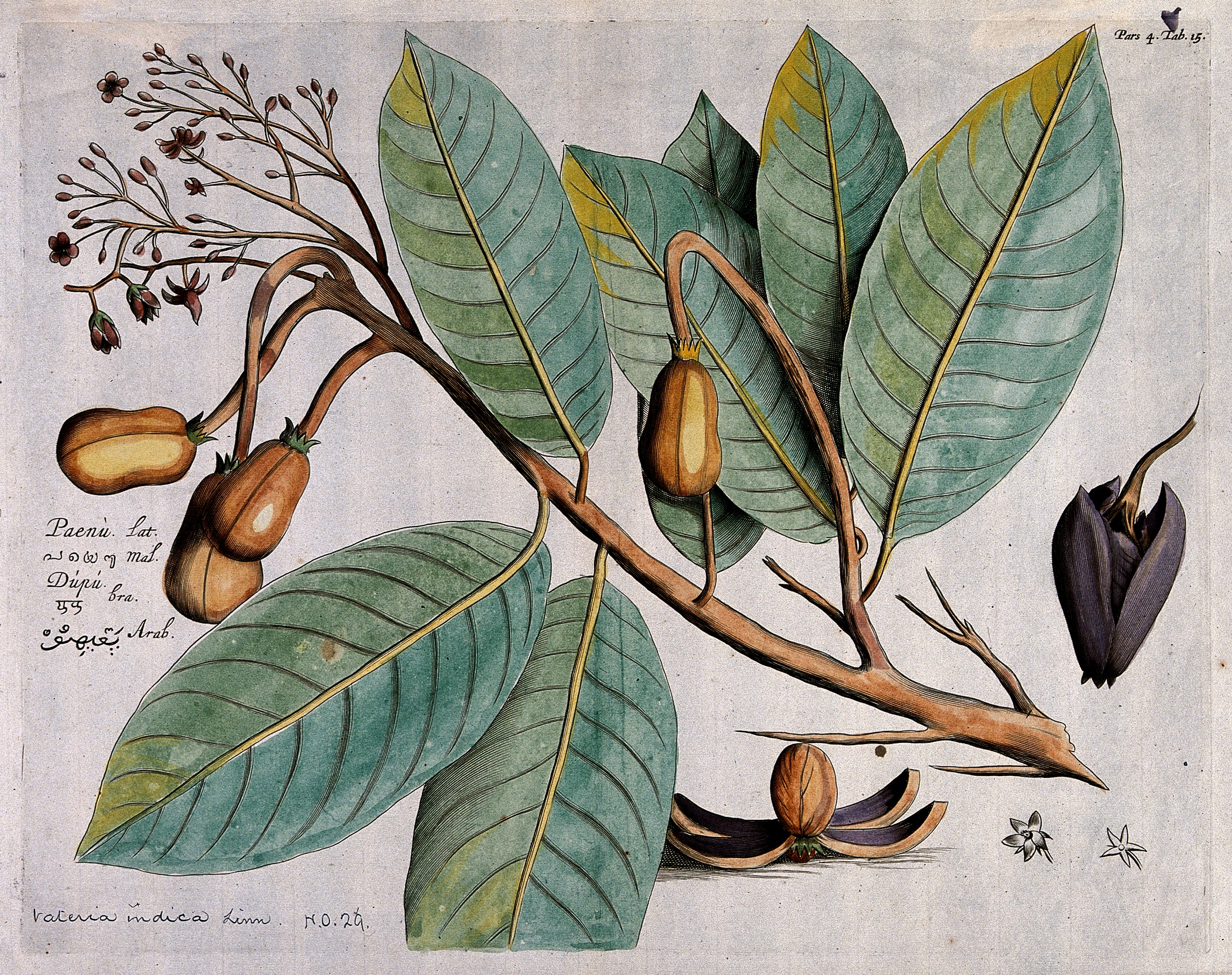
Vateria indica branch with flowers, leaves, fruit,. and dissected fruit showing seed

=== Shape, trunk, and bark ===
Evergreen trees with cylindrical, straight boles, growing up to 40 m tall, occasionally up to 60 m. In evergreen forests, the trees can grow to large girth, with an individual reaching up to 5.26 m in girth recorded in Kodagu. The bark is smooth, grey with green and white blotches on the trunk and a cream colored blaze. On scarring, it exudes a white, aromatic resin. The tree has dense foliage in an oval or dome-like canopy. The young branchlets are nearly cylindrical and have stellate (star-shaped) hairs.

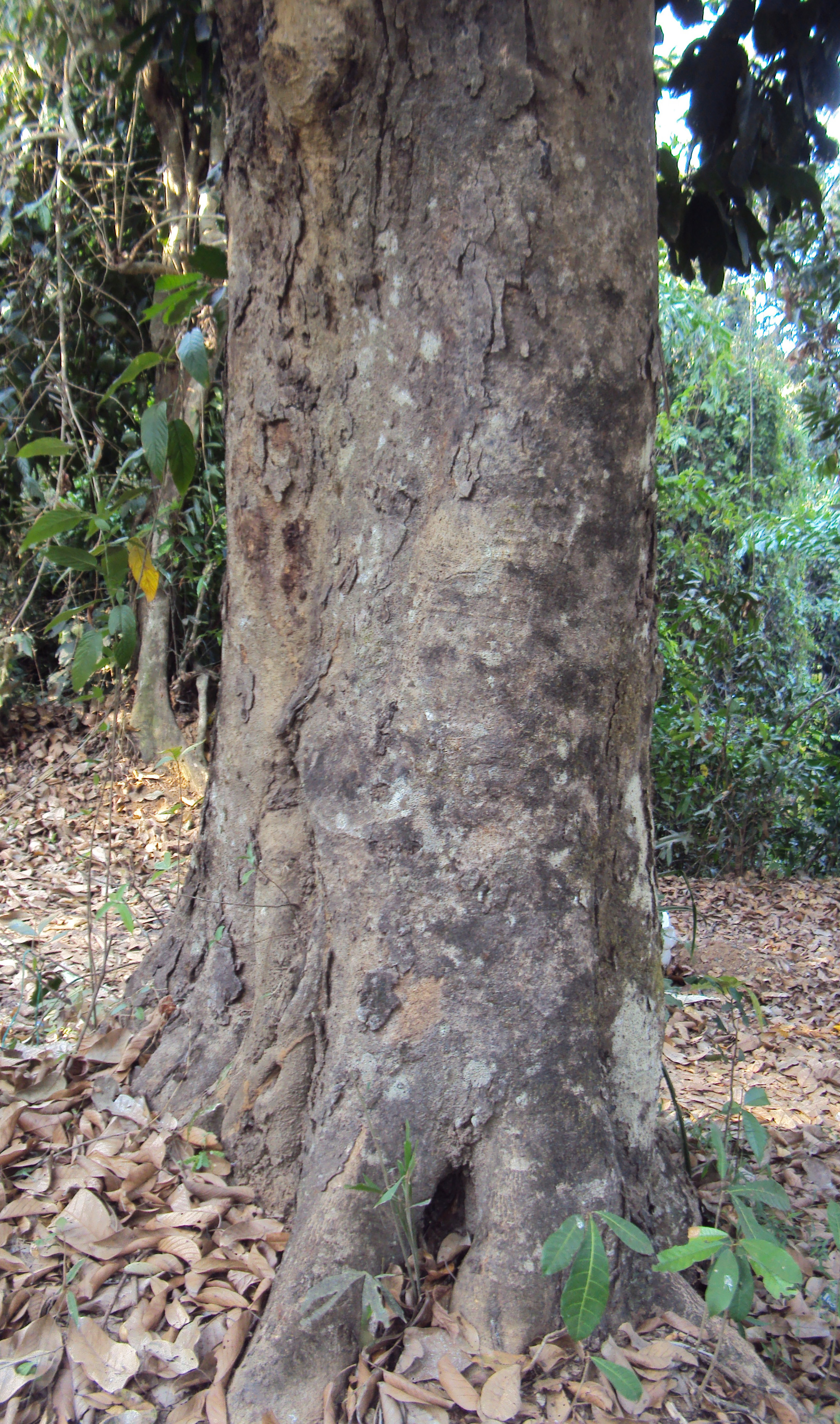
Tree trunk and bark

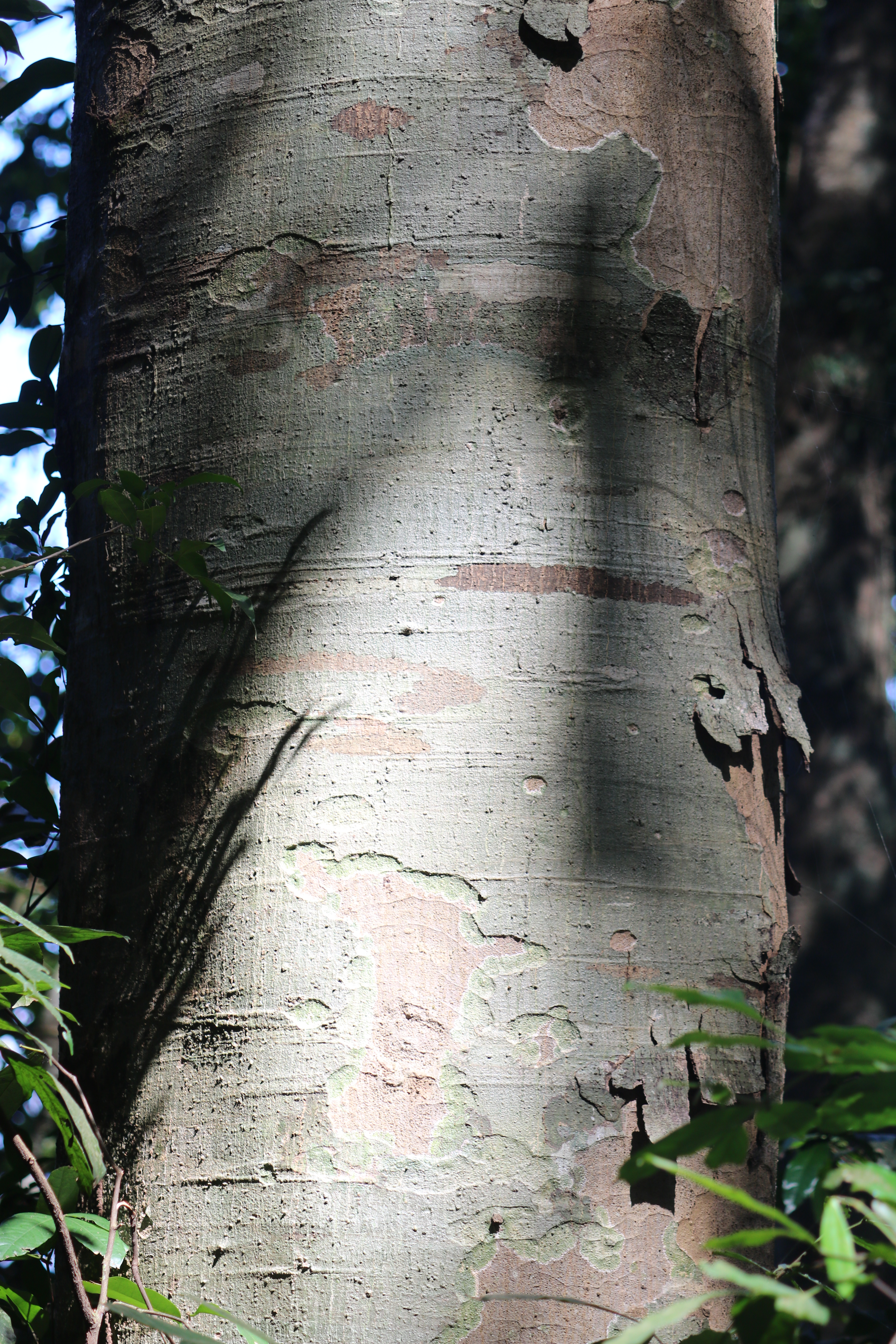
Bark

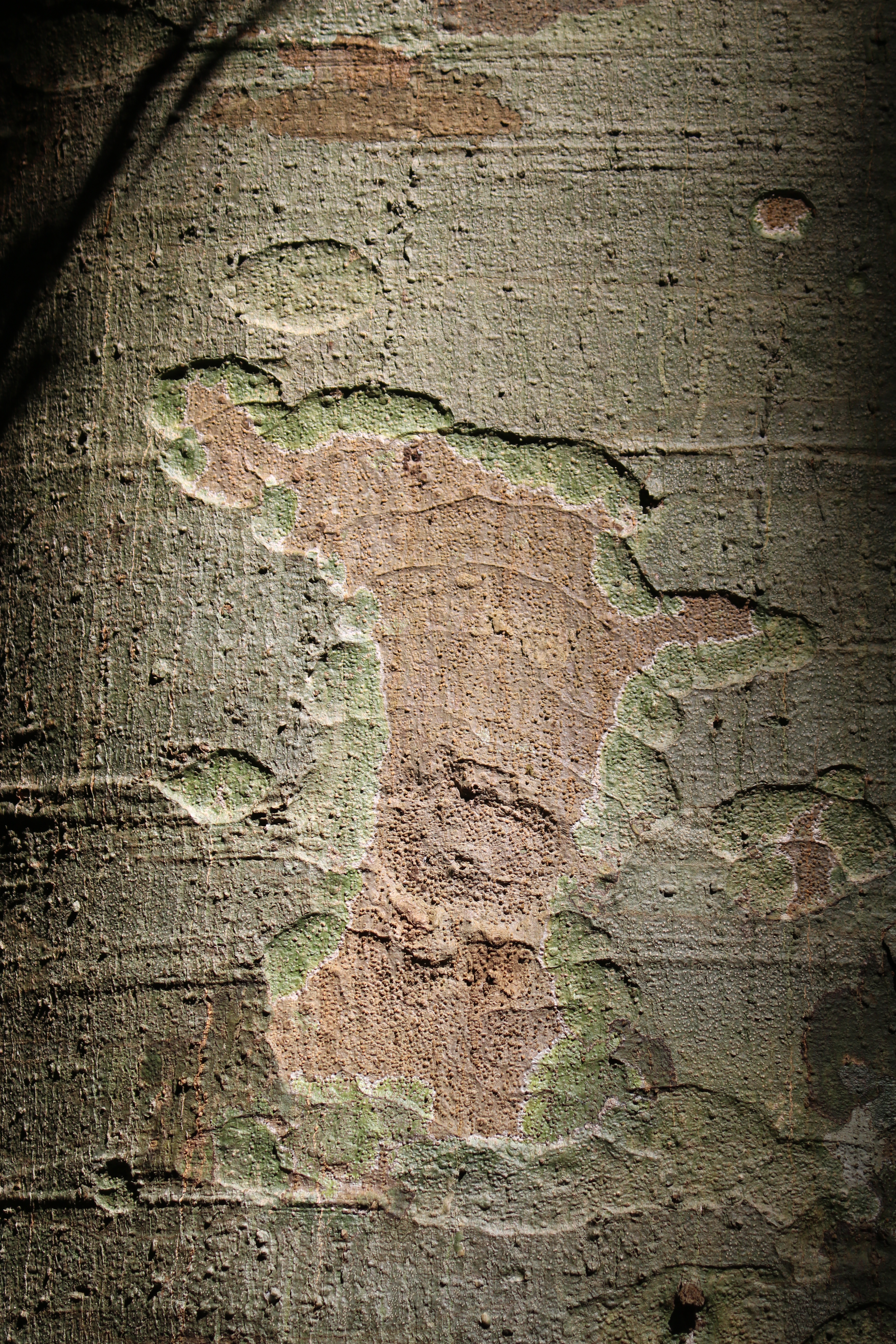
Blotches on bark

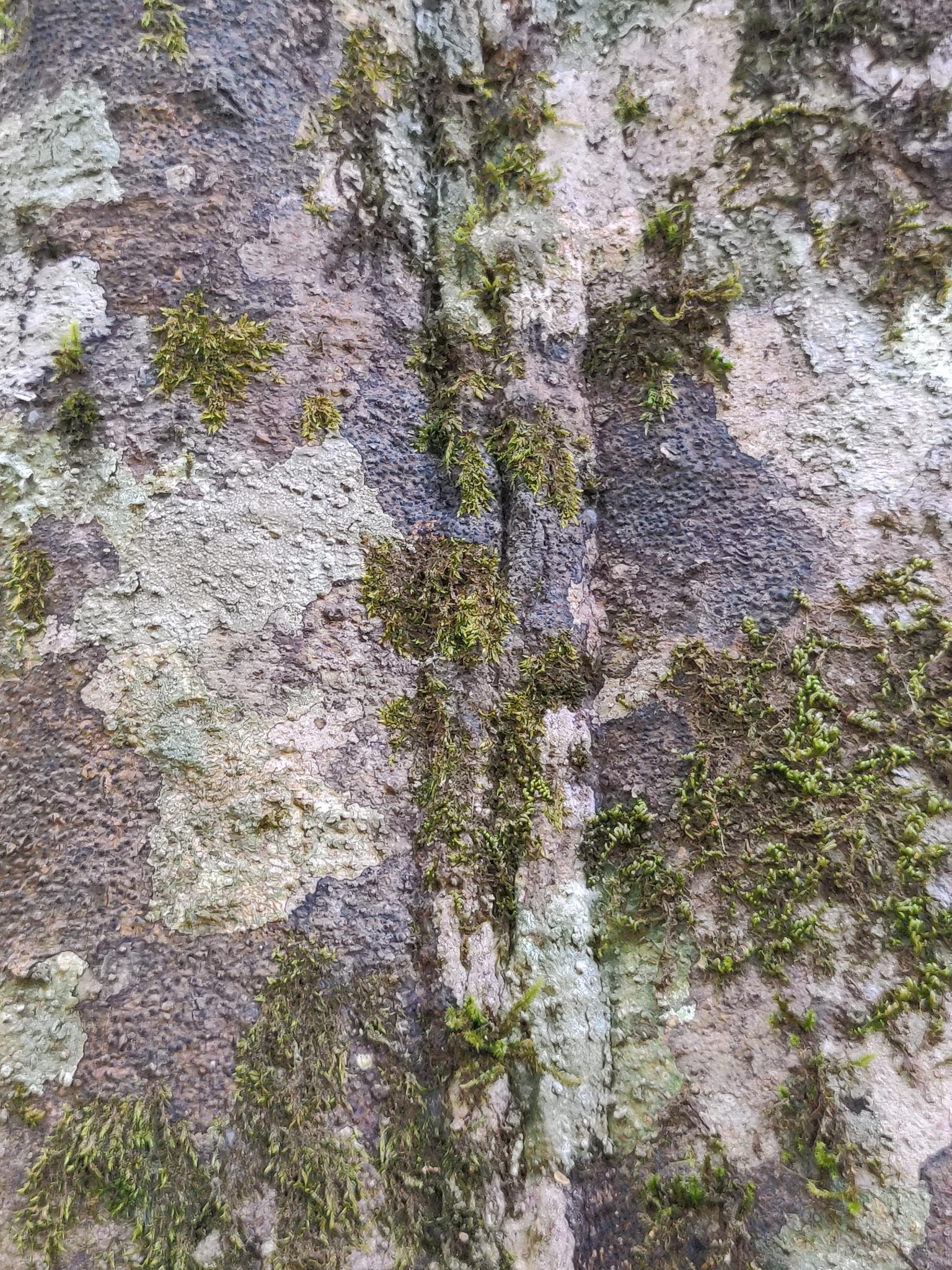
Bark with lichens

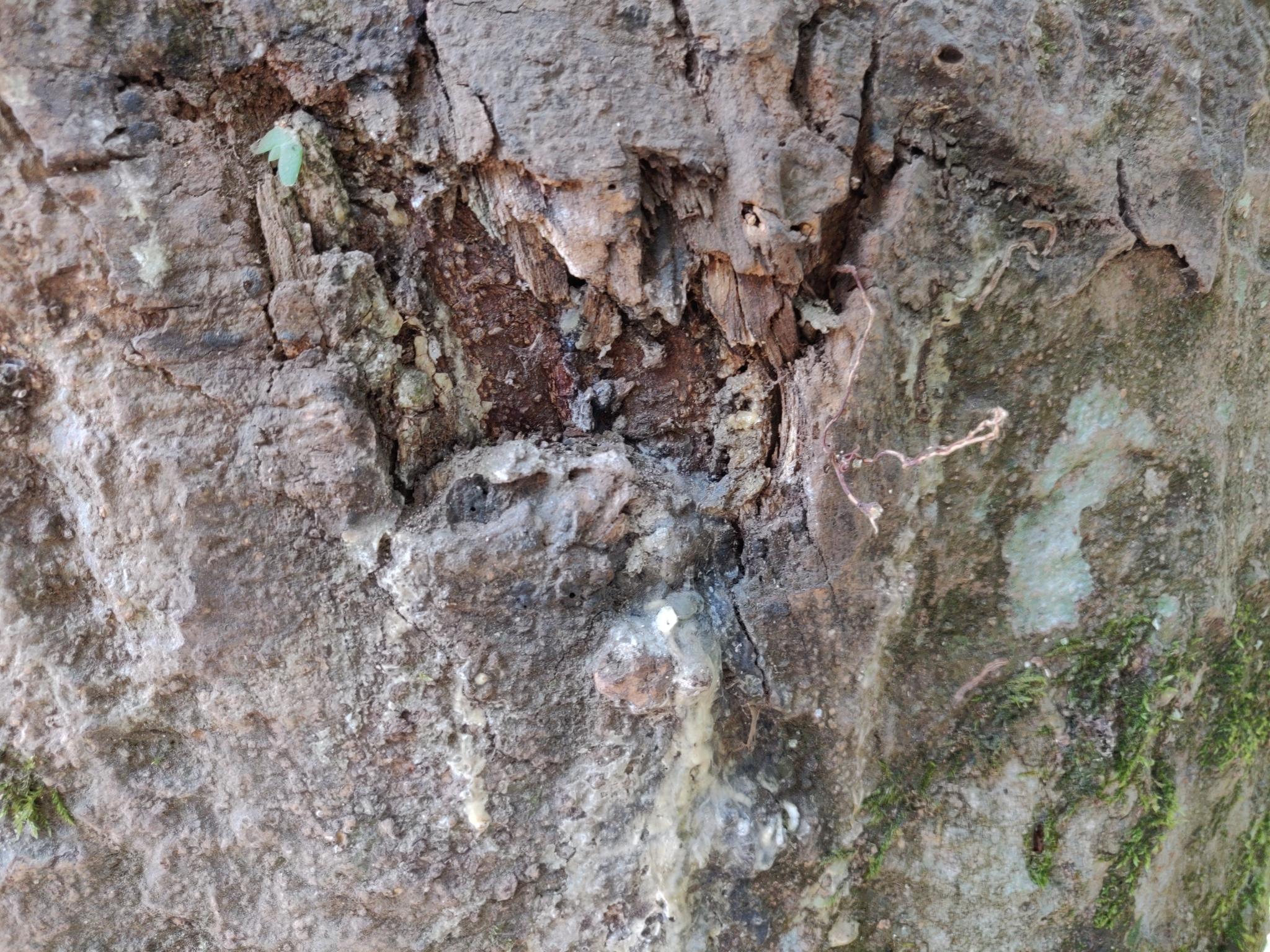
Bark cut, oozing resin

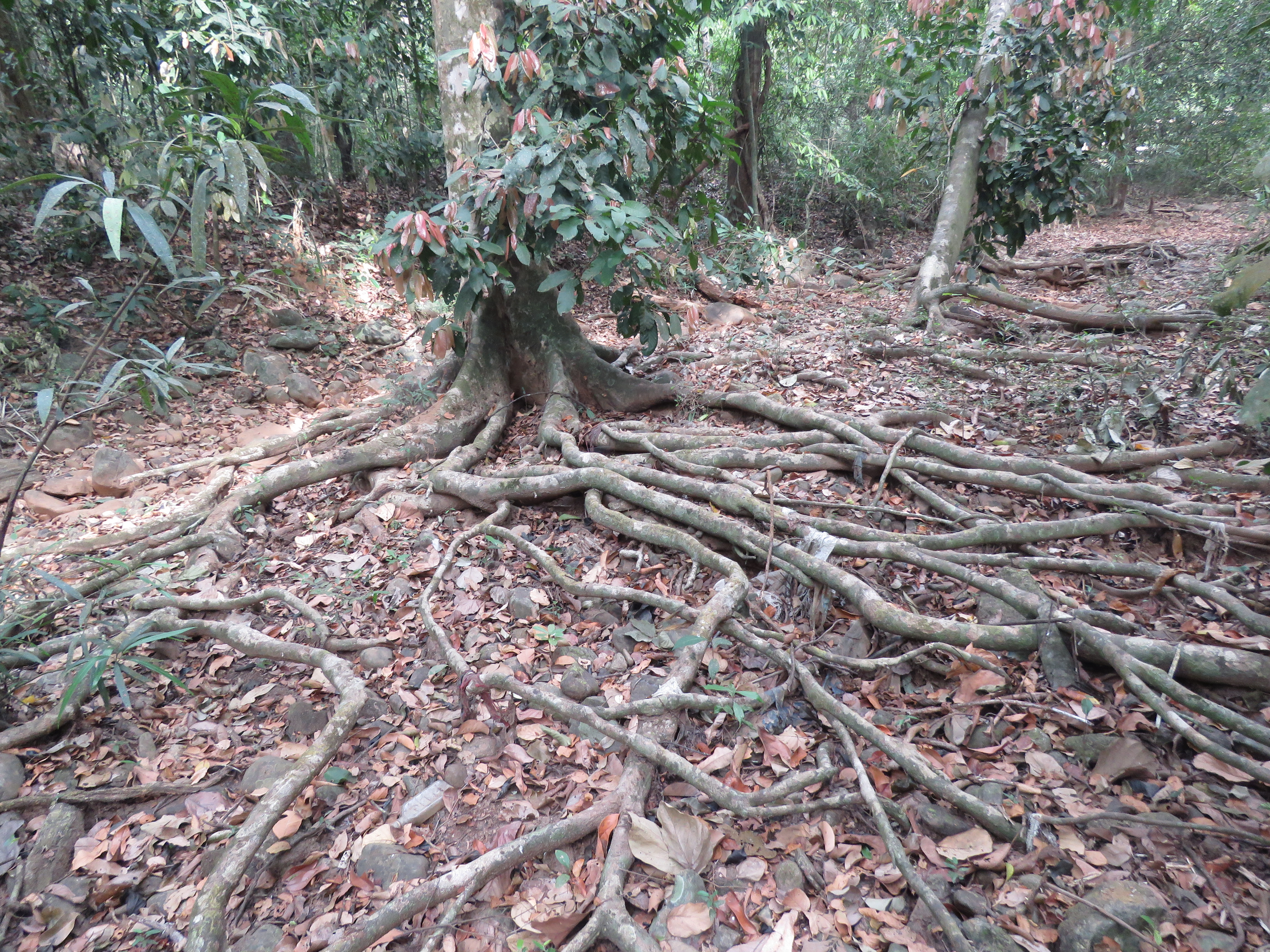
Roots

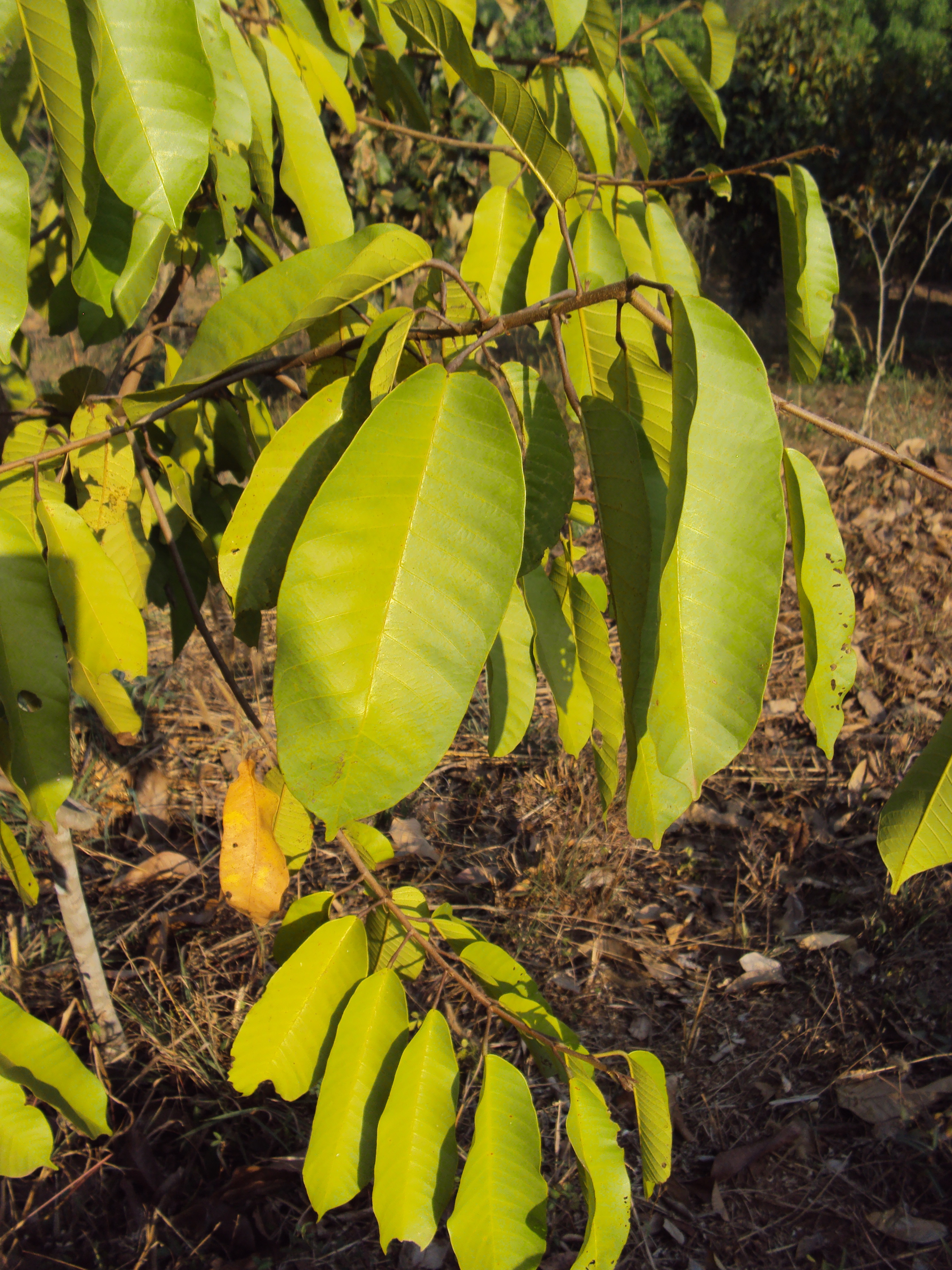
Branchlets

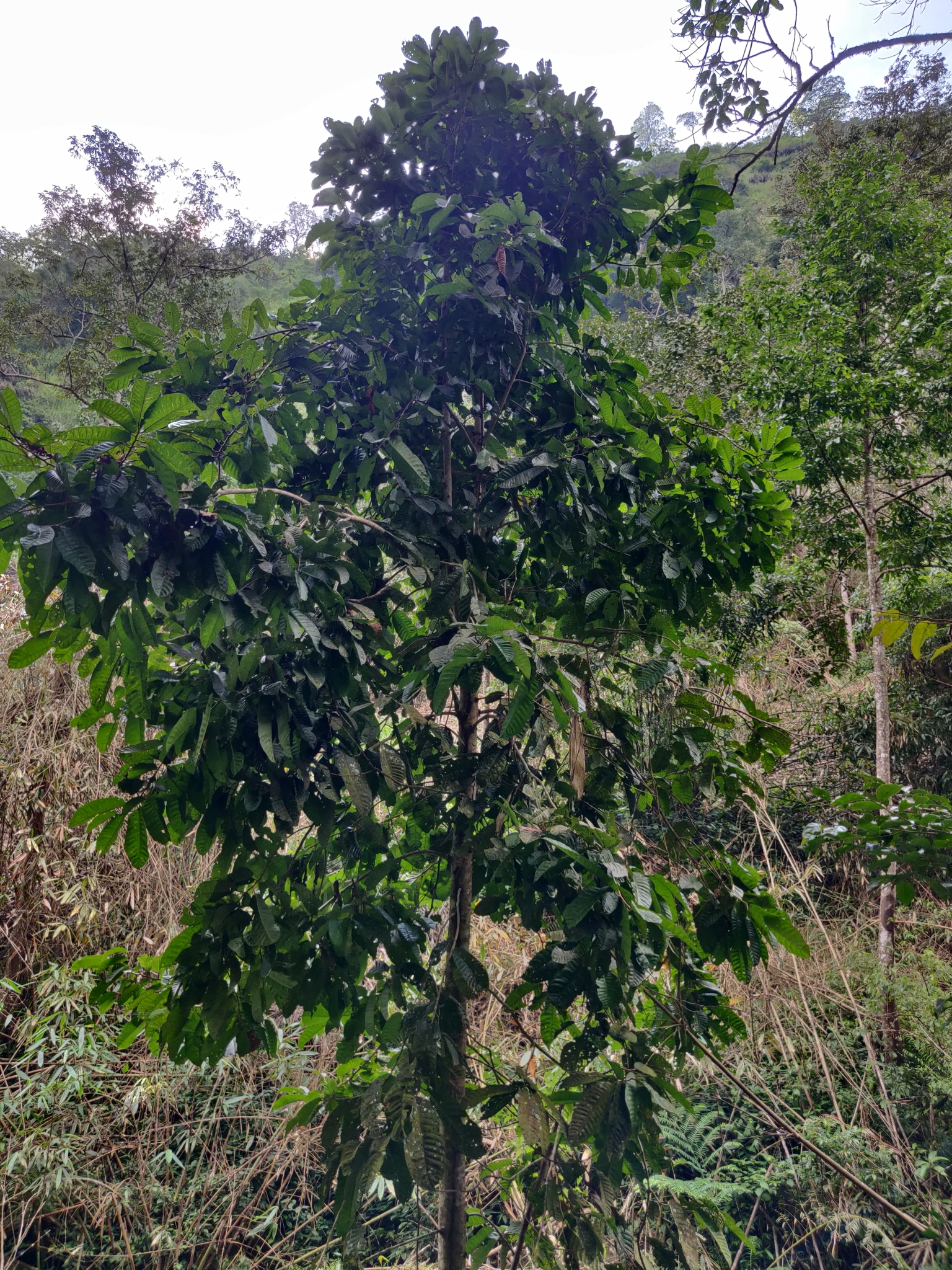
Young sapling

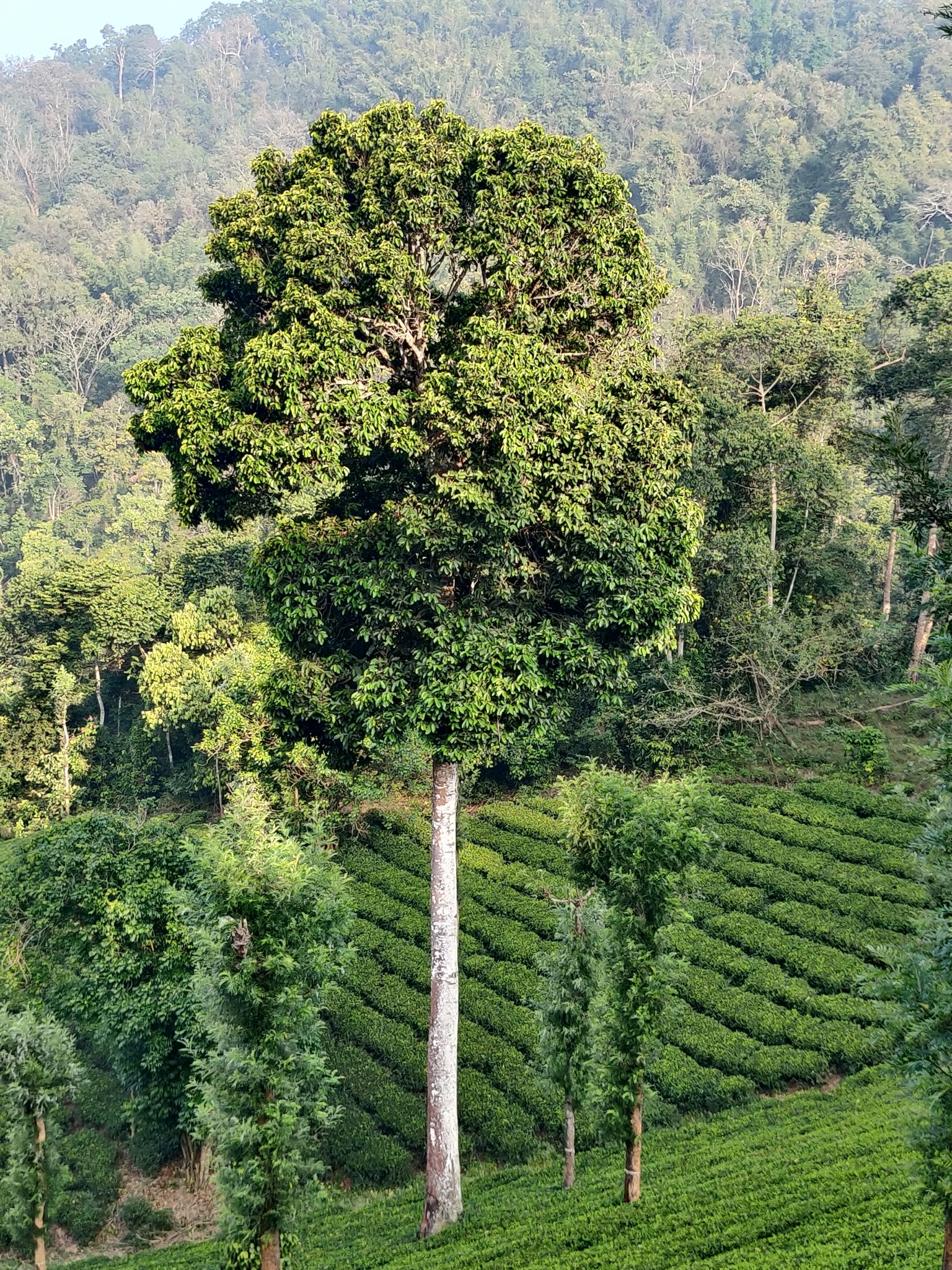
Mature tree in tea estate

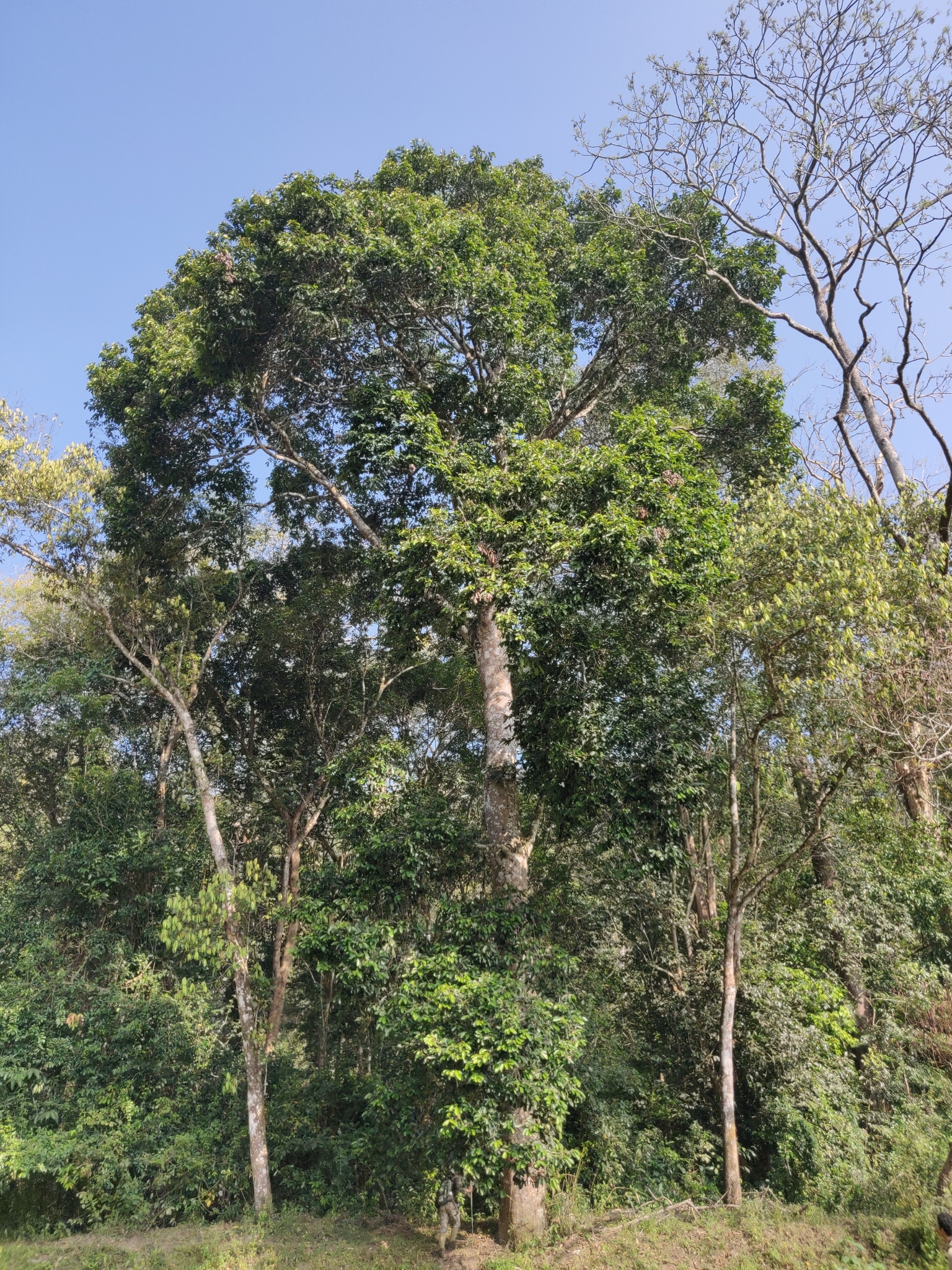
Mature tree showing dome-like canopy

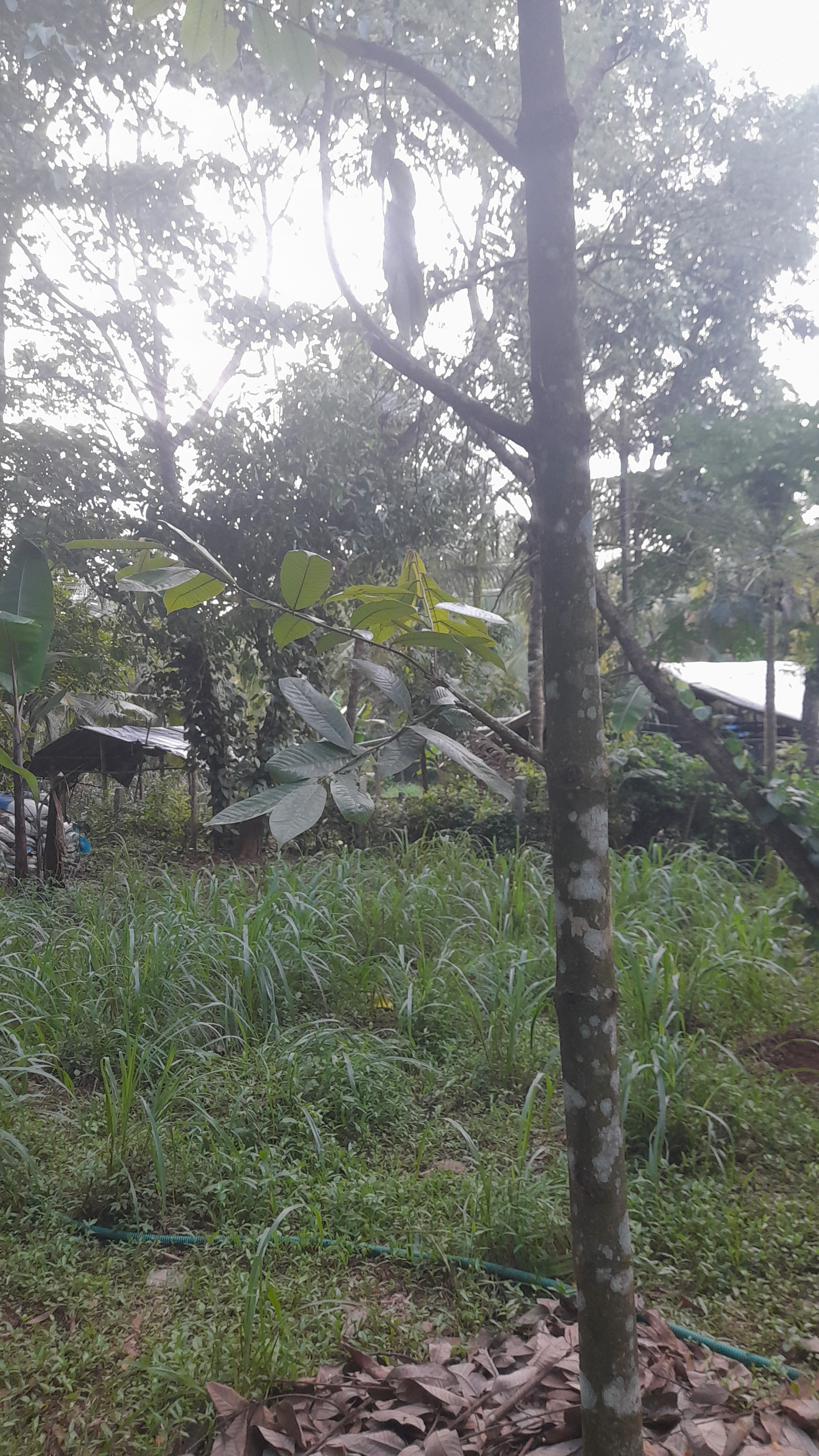
tree

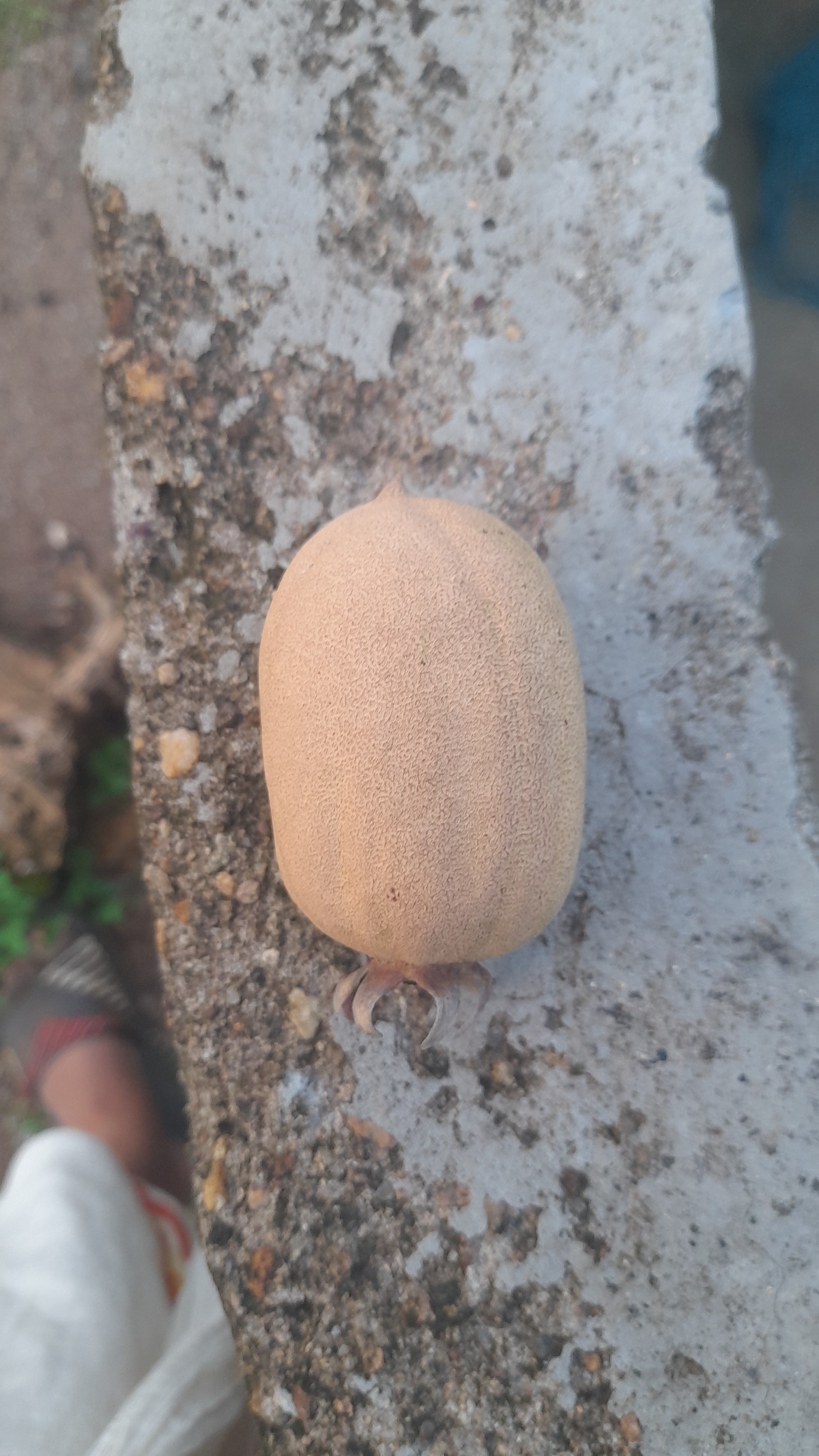
seed

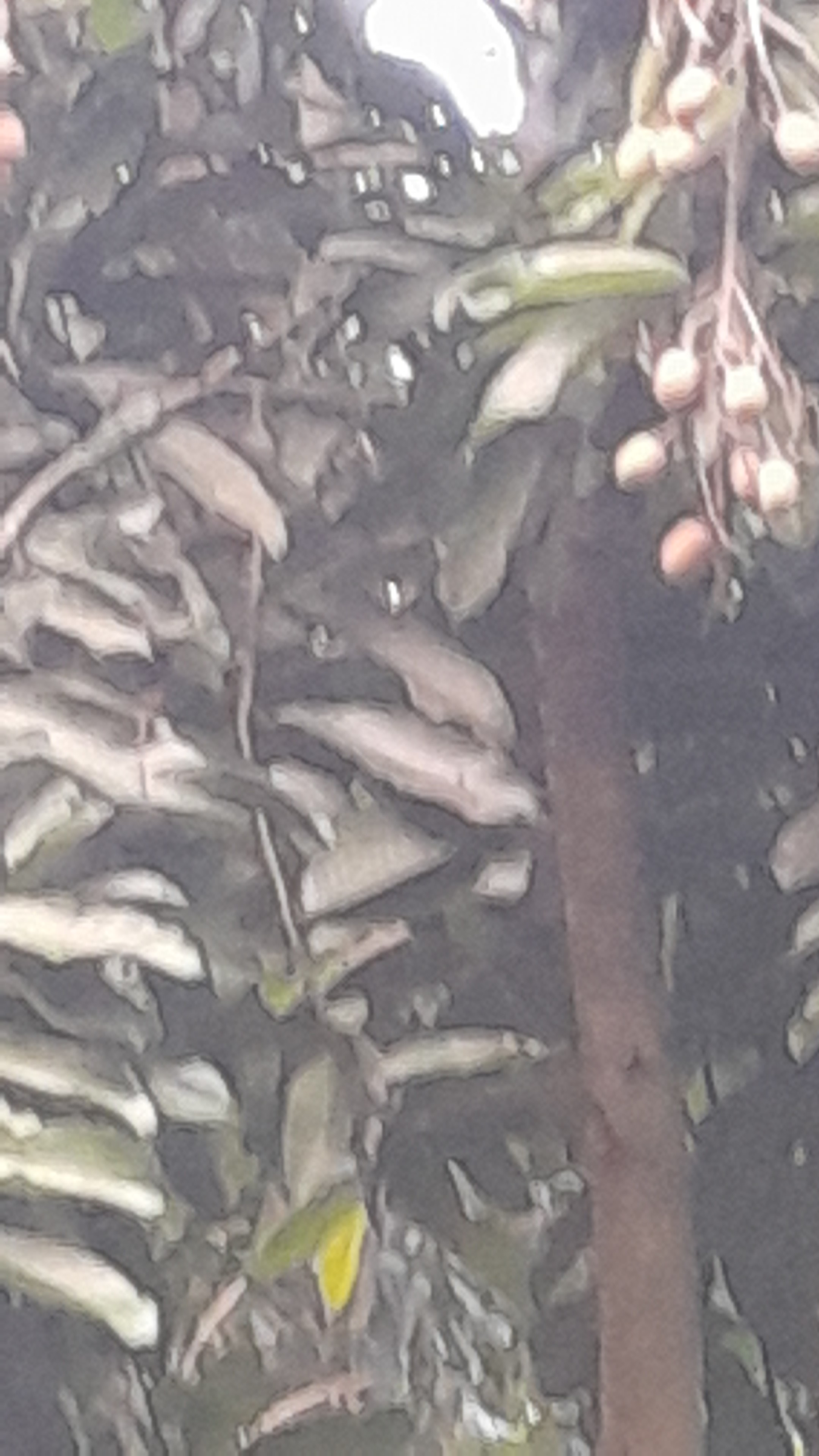
tree with fruits

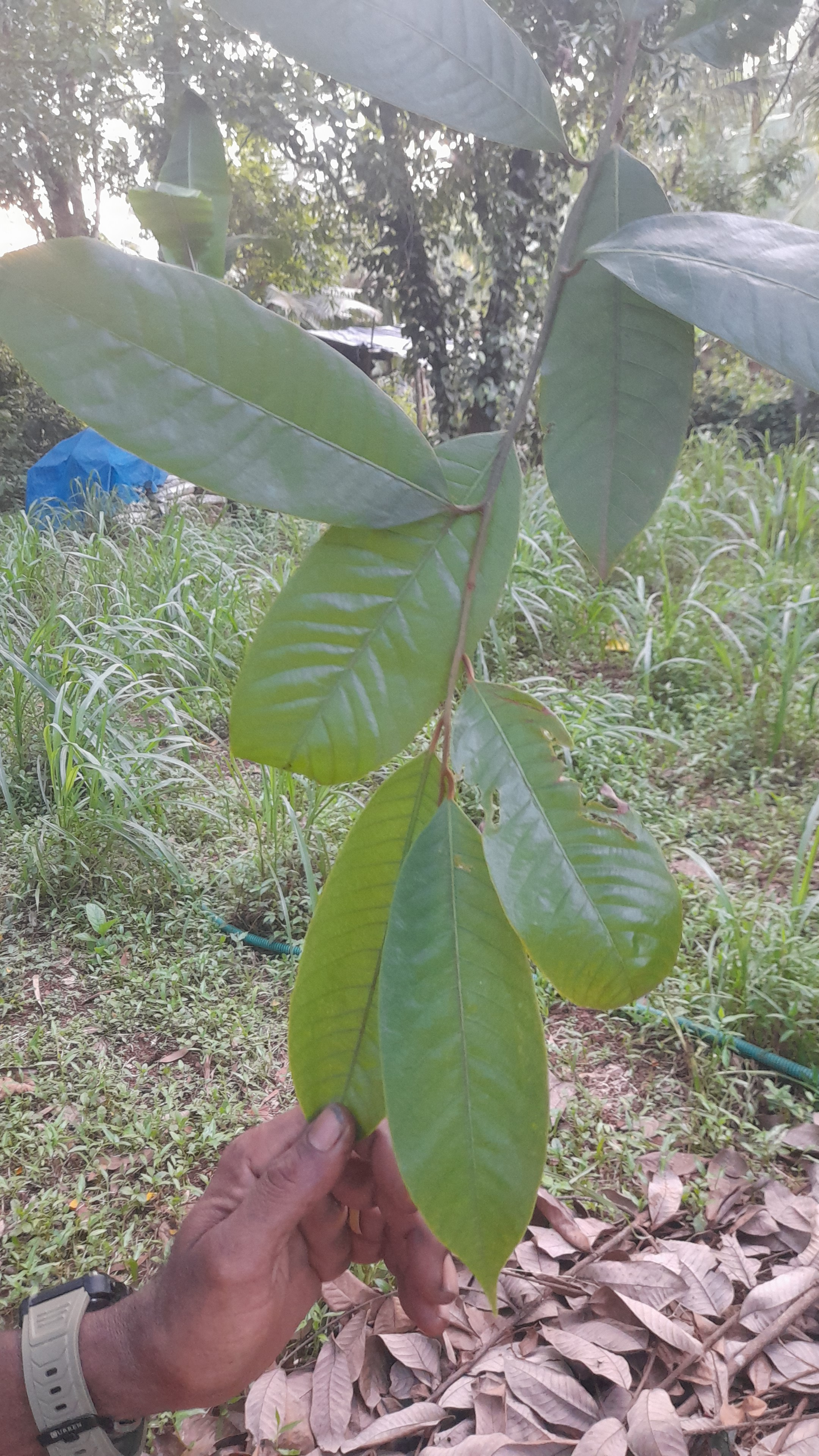
leaf

=== Leaves ===
The leaves, which are simple, alternate, and arranged in a spiral around the twigs, are leathery, about 8-27 x 4.5–10 cm in size, glabrous, elliptic-oblong, with a short pointed tip, rounded base, and entire margin. The young leaf flush is a dark red or maroon, turning to pinkish red and green as the leaf matures. The petioles are 2 to 3.5 cm long, swollen at apex, and nearly glabrous, with narrow lateral stipules that fall off. The venation of the leaves comprises 13 to 20 pairs of secondary nerves, with closely parallel tertiary nerves at right angles to the secondaries.

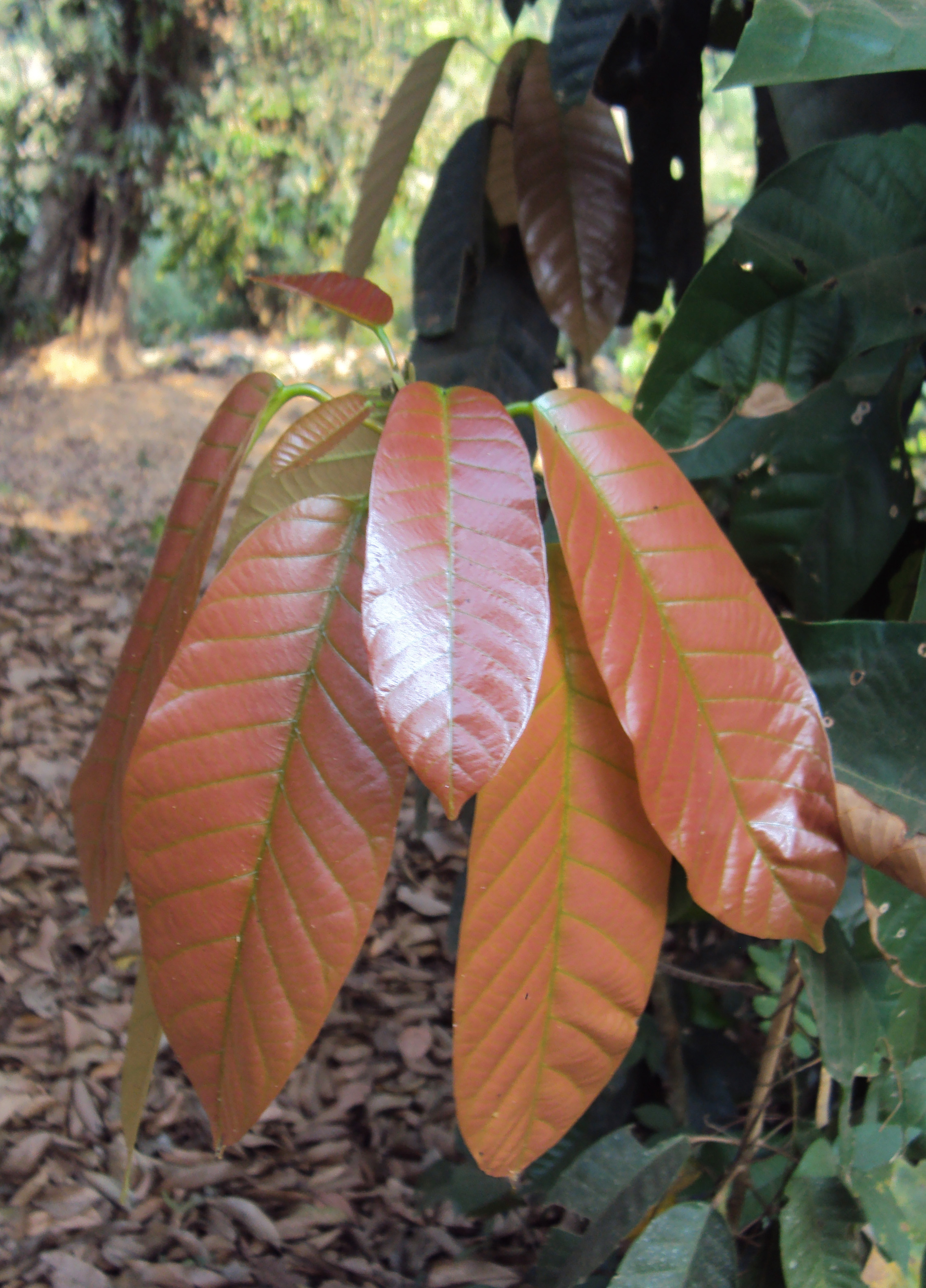
Young leaf flushing red

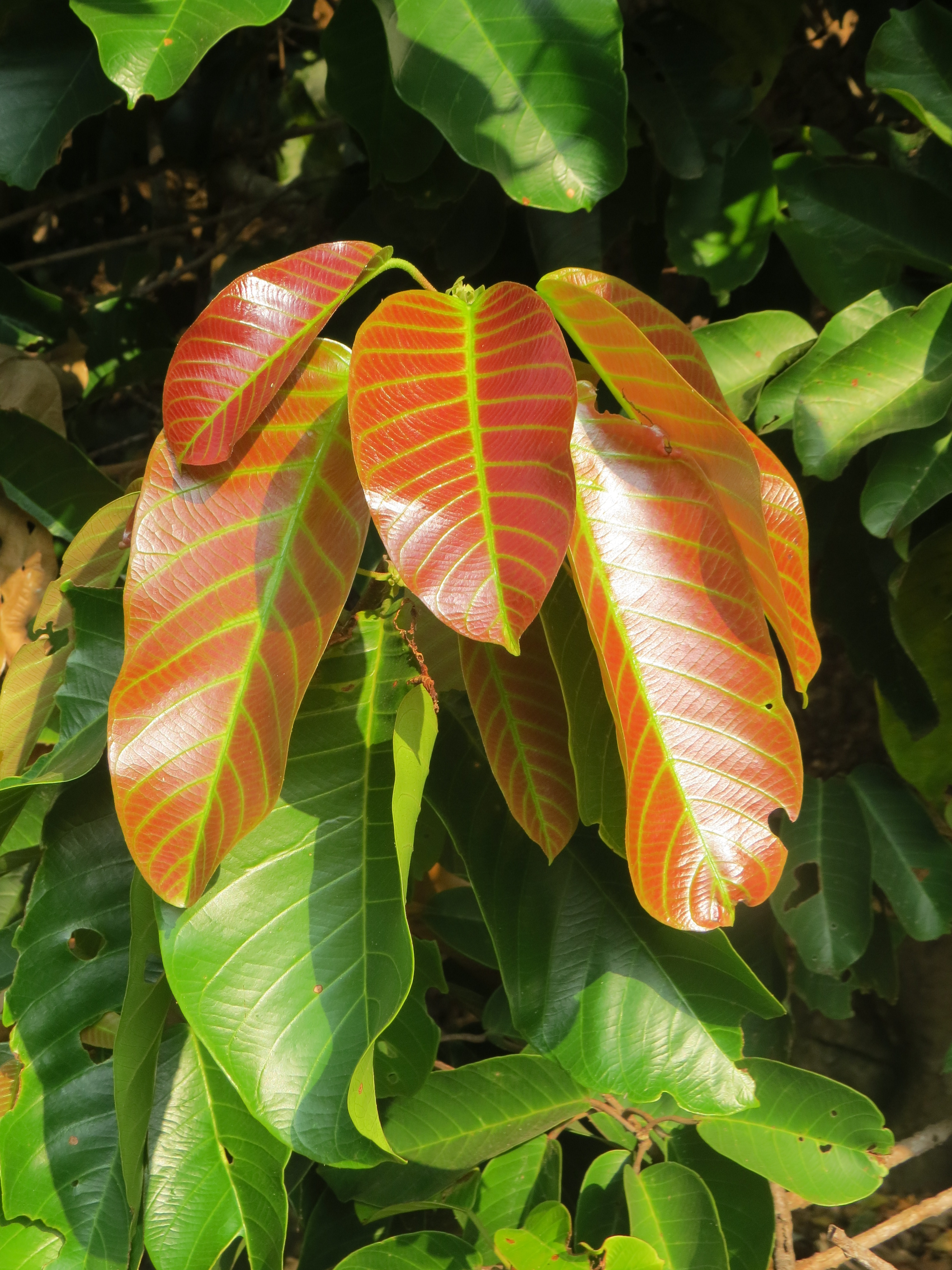
Leaf flush

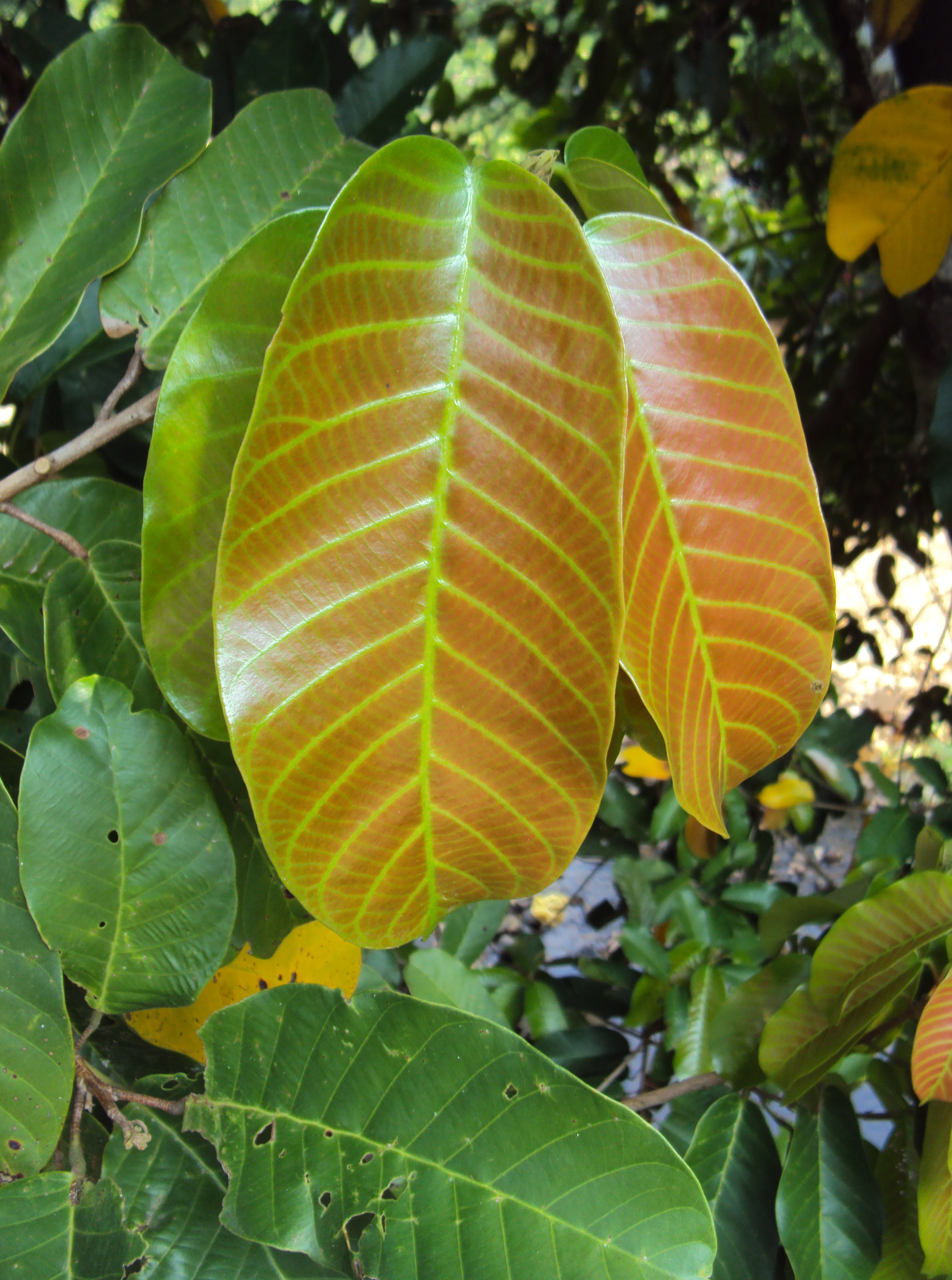
Maturing leaf

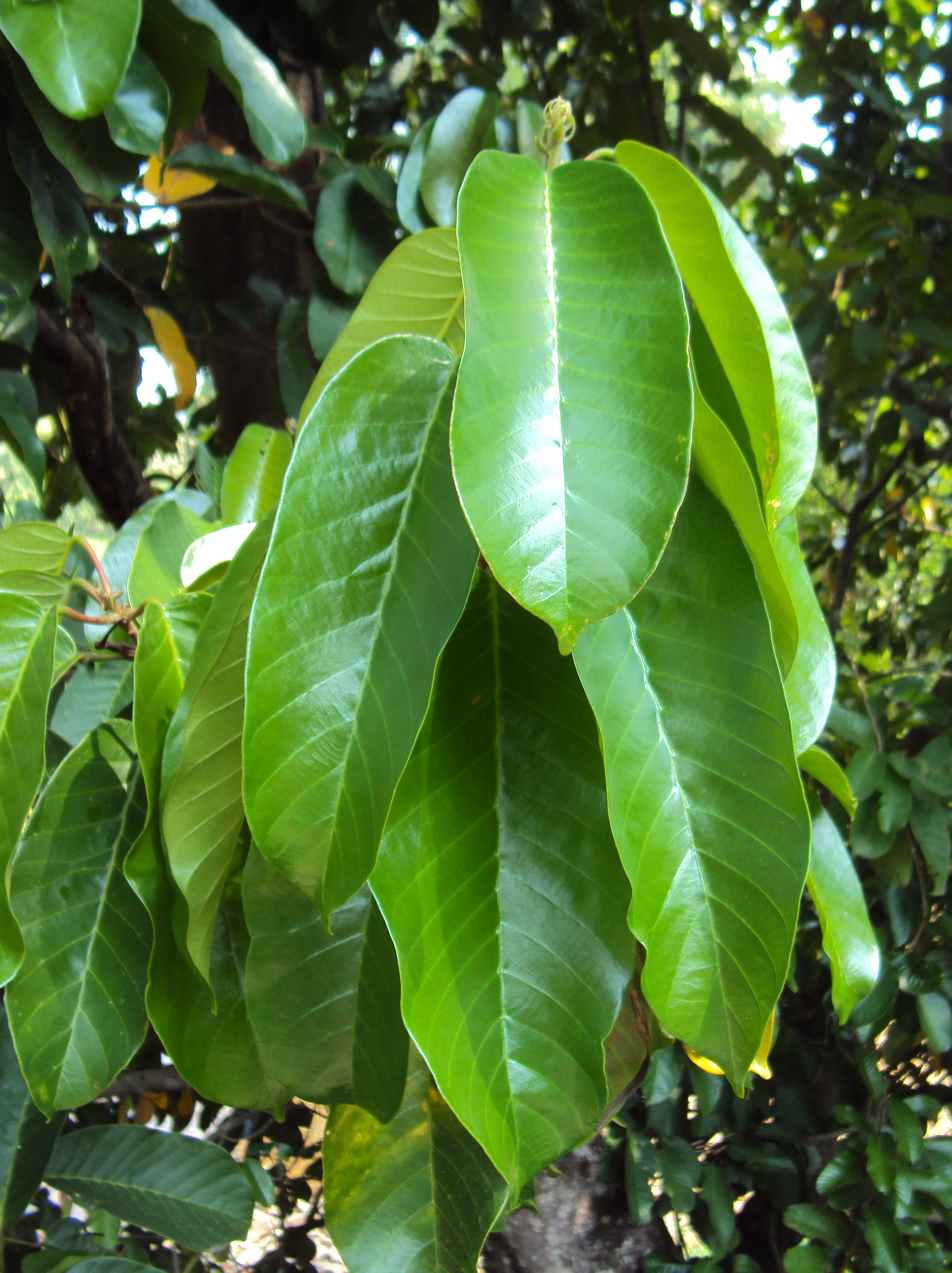
Mature leaf

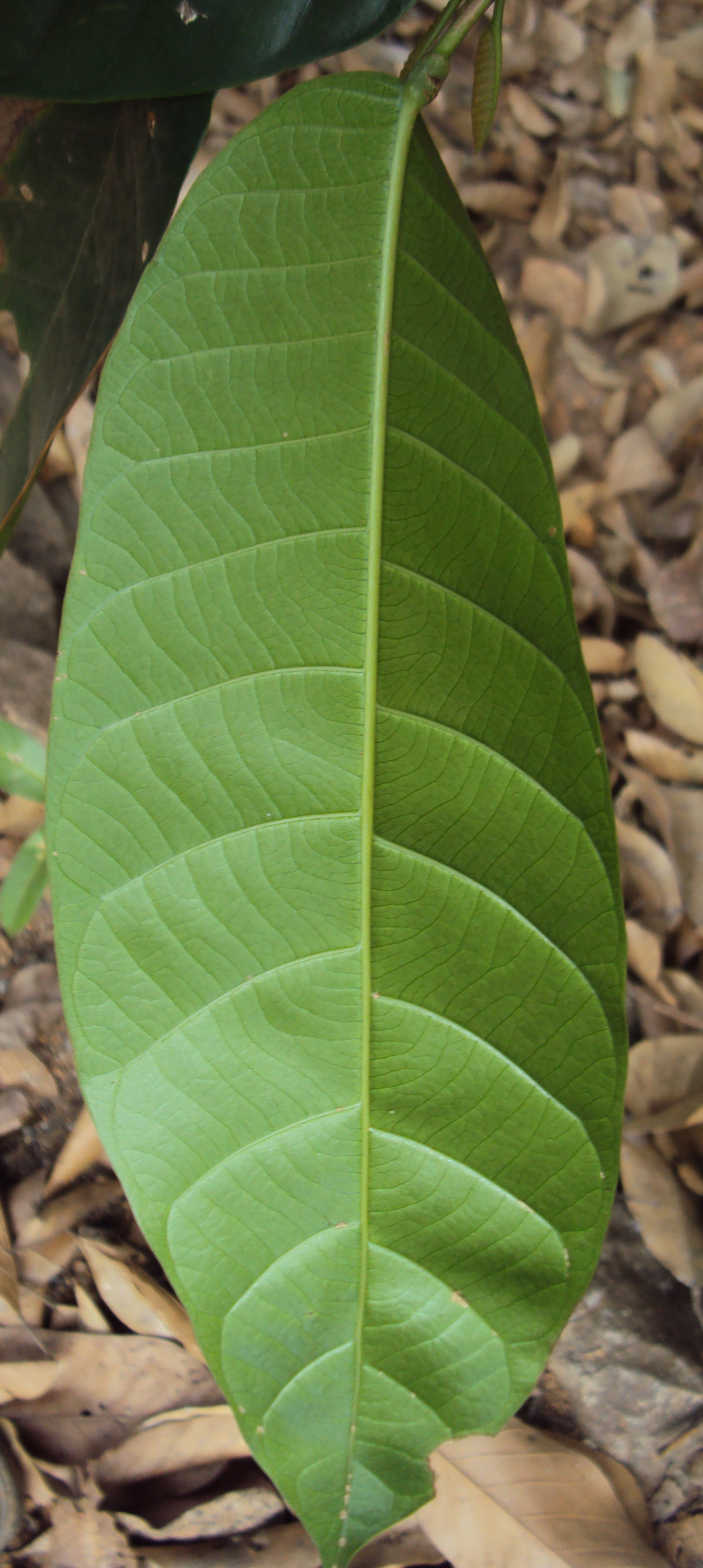
Single leaf, close-up

=== Flower, fruit and seed ===
The inflorescence appears in axillary panicles densely clothed in stellate hairs. The flowers are white, fragrant, about 2 cm across, with 5 petals, about 40-50 stamens and yellow anthers, with a columnar style that protrudes beyond the anthers. The fruit is a 3-valved capsule, brown, and oblong or egg-shaped, about 6.4 x 3.8 cm in size. The base of the fruit has the persistent remains of the calyx with the 5 sepals curved back. The ovary is 3-celled, with 2 ovules in each cell, but the fruit typically produces a single seed with large cotyledons. The average weight of the mature fruit (±SE) is 72.6 (± 4.4) g; the fruit has a thick and hard pericarp and bulky cotyledons weighing about 13.2 (± 1.4) g.

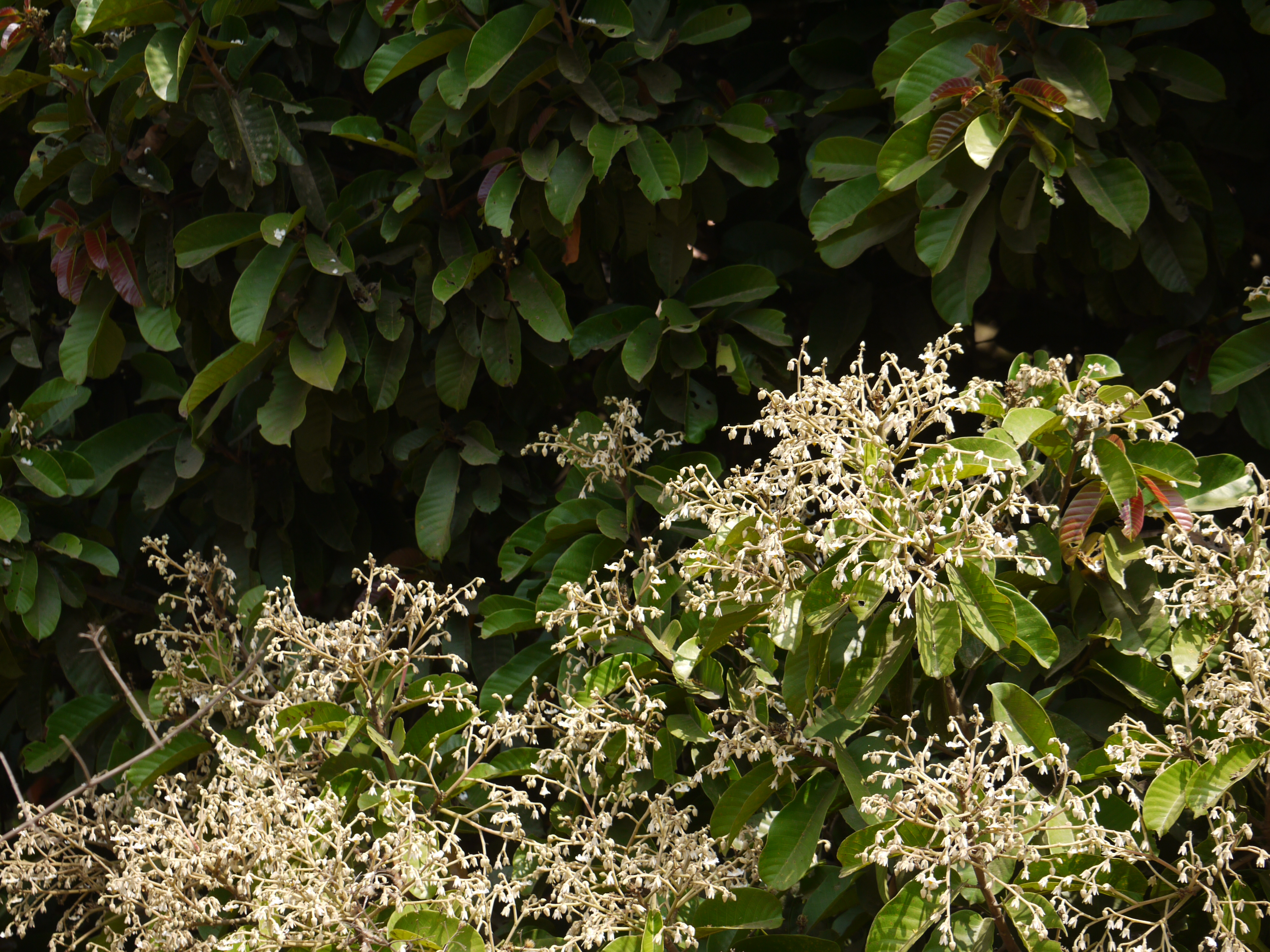
Inflorescence

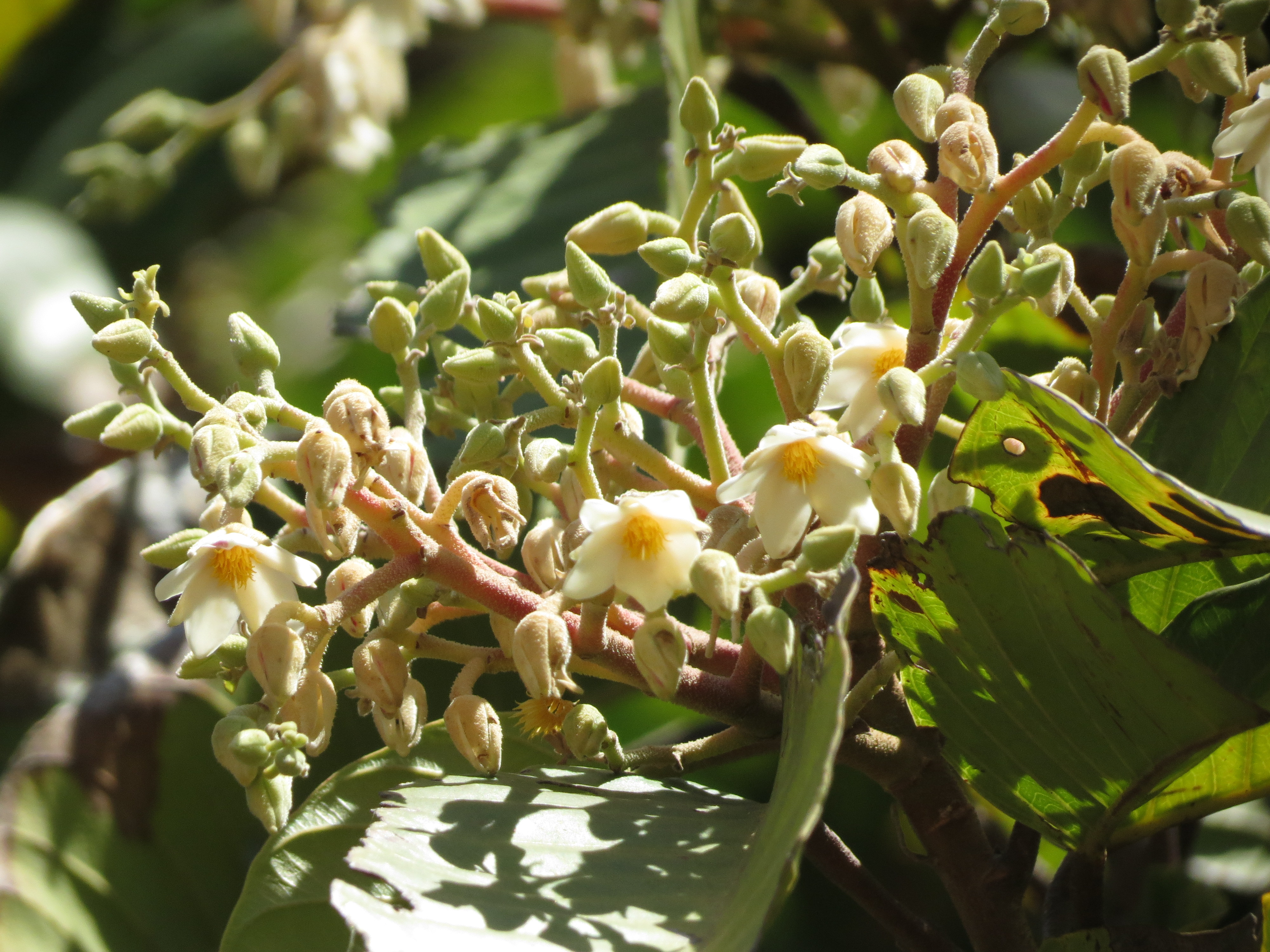
Inflorescence

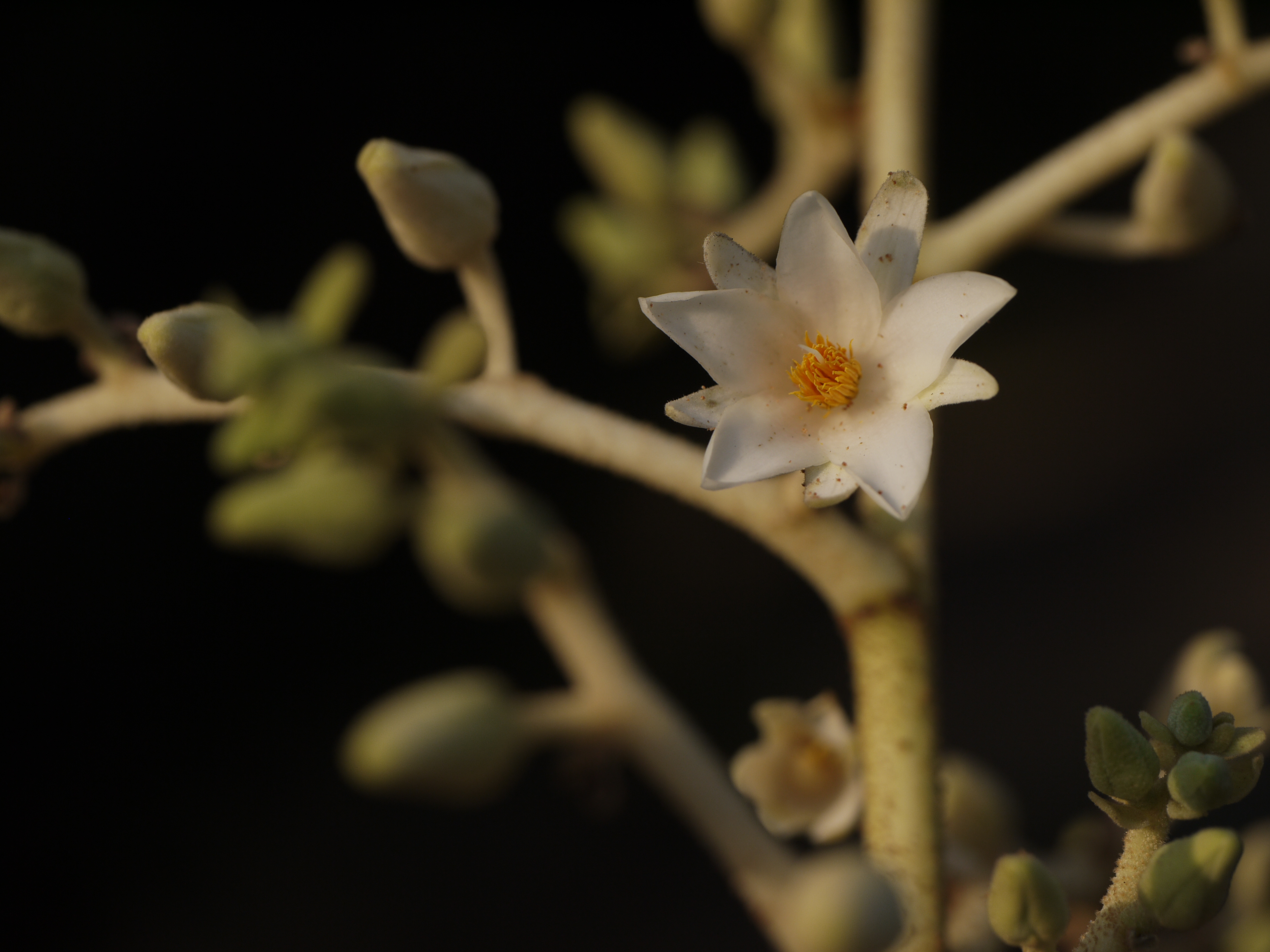
Flower

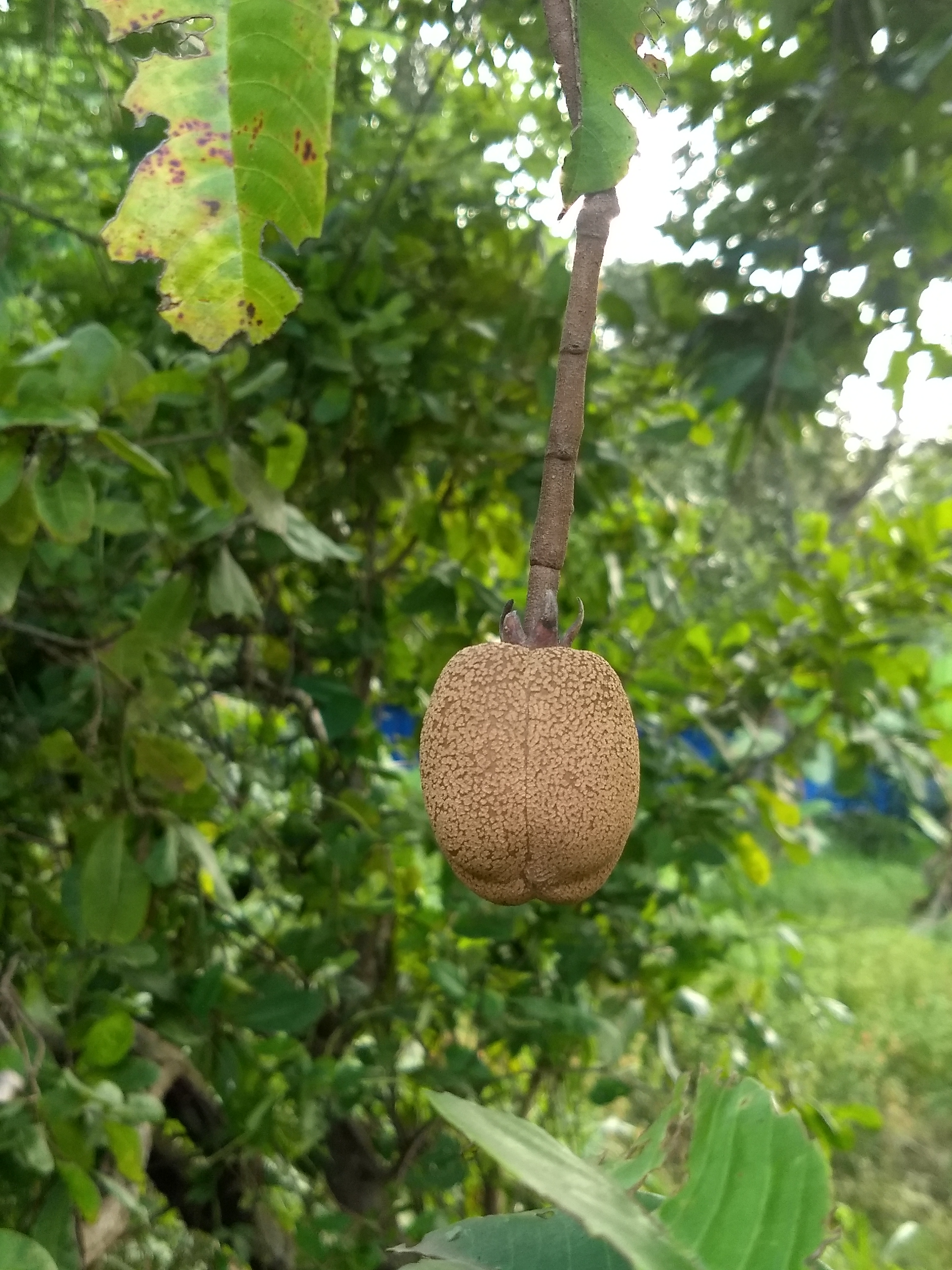
Fruit

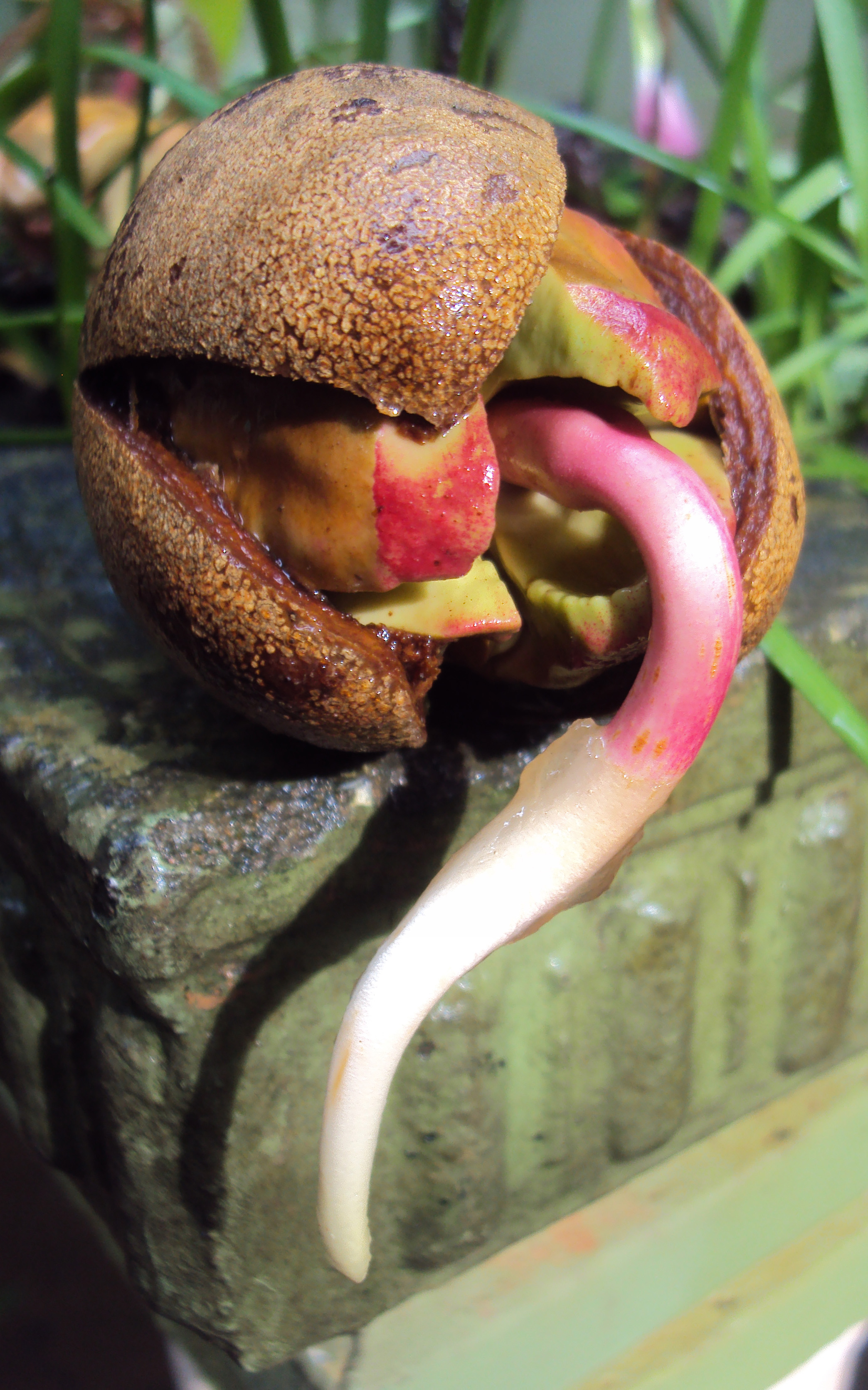
Germinating seed

== Taxonomy ==
Vateria malabarica Blume is a Synonym of Vateria indica L. The genus Vateria has three species with accepted names, of which Vateria indica and Vateria macrocarpa occur in India and Vateria copallifera occurs in Sri Lanka. Vateria indica has smaller leaves (7-20 x 5–9 cm), shorter petiole (25–40 mm), and oblong fruit compared to Vateria macrocarpa that has larger leaves (14-40 x 6–20 cm), longer petiole (25–60 mm), and ovoid or oblong fruit with pointed, often curved tip.

Studies indicate the species has a mitotic chromosome number of 2n=22. Polymorphic microsatellite markers have been identified for Vateria indica and the species has an expected heterozygosity of 0.44 to 0.84.

== Common names ==
The species has a number of common names in local languages.

Tamil: Dhupa maram தூப மரம், Painimaram பைனிமரம், Vellaikundrikam வெள்ளைகுன்றிகம், Vellaidamar வெள்ளை டமார், Vellai kungiliyam வெள்ளை குங்கிலியம், turulakkam துருளக்கம், vellai kunkiliyam வெள்ளைக்குங்கிலியம்

Malayalam: കുന്തിരിക്കപ്പൈന്‍ Kuntirikkappayin, പയിനി Paini, വെള്ളപ്പൈന്‍ Vellappayin, Baine, Kunturukkam, Paenoe, Paine, Paini, Payan, Payani, Payin, Pandam, Pantam, Peini, Perumpayani, Perumpiney, Pine, Piny, Pyney, Telli, Thelli, Vella kunturukkum, Vellapayin, Vellakondricum, Velutta kunturukkam, ബൈനെ, കുന്തുരുക്കും, പൈനോയ്‌, പൈനെ, പൈനി, പയന്‍, പയിനി, പയിന്‍, പഞ്ഞം, പീനി, പെരുംപയിണി, പൈനെയ്‌, തെള്ളി, വെളള കുന്തിരി

Kannada: ಬಿಳಿ ಡಾವರು Bili Daamaru, ಬಿಳಿ ಧೂಪ Bili Dhupa, ಧೂಪದ ಮರ Dhupada Mara, Bilagaggala, Dhupa mara, Gugli, Hugadamara, Rala, Velthapaini

Telugu: తెల్లగుగ్గిలము tellaguggilamu

Marathi: चंद्रुस chandrusa

Odia: ମନ୍ଦଧୂପ mandadhupa, ସନ୍ଦରସ sandarasa

Sanskrit: सर्जकः sarjakah

English: Indian copal tree, Piney varnish tree, White dammar

== Distribution and habitat ==
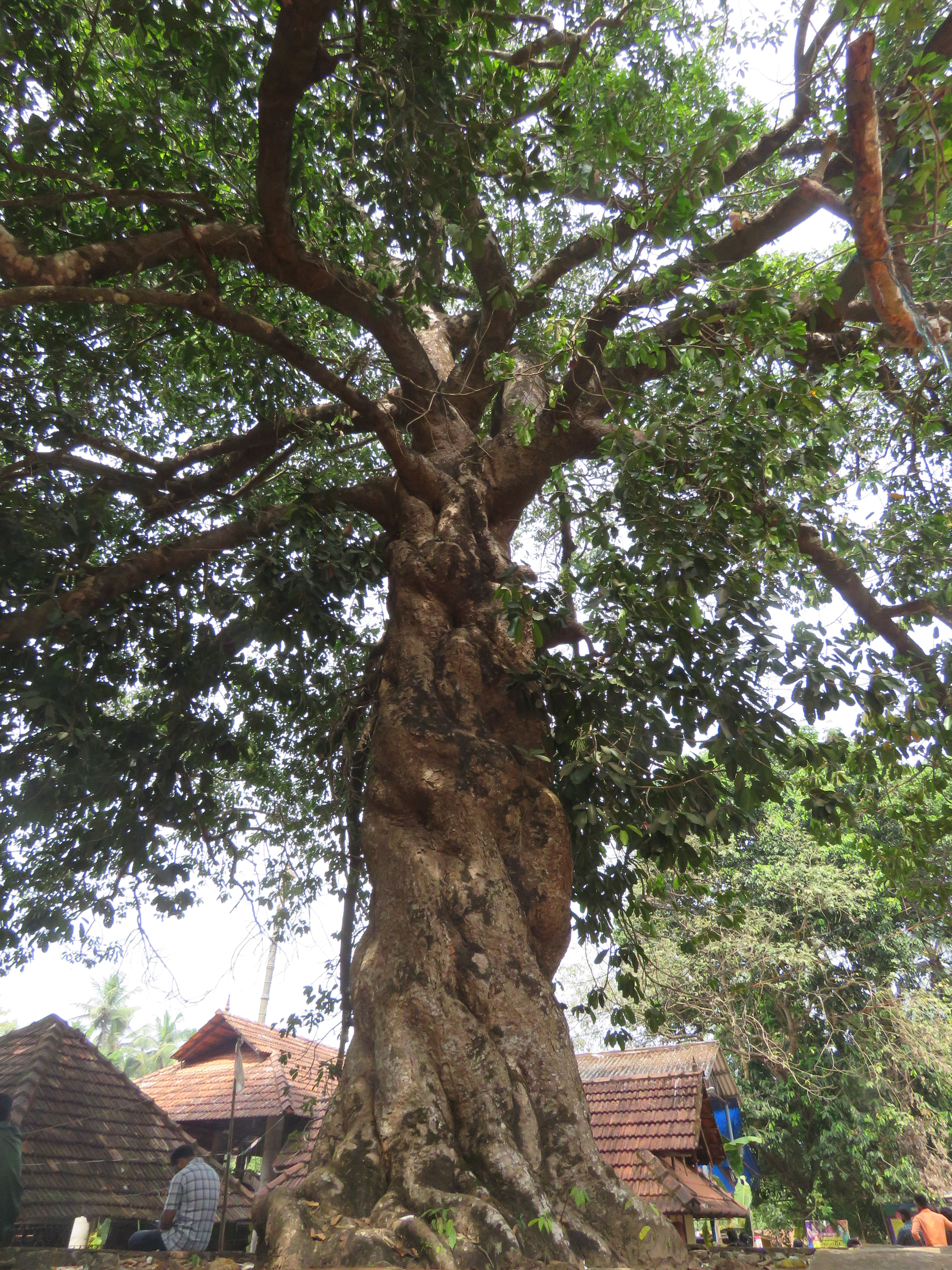
Vateria indica at Lokanarkavu Temple

The species is endemic to the Western Ghats mountain range in India, in the southern and central region, from the Agasthyamalai Hills in the south to southern Maharashtra. It chiefly occurs in the states of Kerala, Tamil Nadu, and Karnataka. The species occurs in evergreen forests from the coastal plains and foothills usually up to an elevation of about 760 m, or to 800 m on the windward side of the Western Ghats in Karnataka. Although it is more common in lower elevations, trees may be found up to an elevation of 1200 m.

Outside forests, the tree is found as avenue trees along roadsides in some areas. In Karnataka, the species does not occur in Uttara Kannada district, but was introduced by the Sonda Kinds about 500 years ago and planted along the roadsides in Sirsi, Siddapur, and Yellapur towns. It was planted extensively as an avenue tree in Dakshina Kannada and the Malabar and Travancore regions of Kerala.

=== Climatic factors ===
Within its distributional range, Vateria indica occurs in areas with a mean annual rainfall of 2000 to 3000 mm and a mean annual temperature slightly over 27 °C (range 16.7 °C to 37.8 °C). The number of rainy days varies from 118 to 130 with a mean annual humidity of 77-79% within the zone of distribution.

=== Geology, soil, and topography ===
Vateria indica occurs in areas where the underlying rock is a gneissic complex, often laminated, which may be covered by laterite 9–10 m deep. The laterite may be in stages of disintegration from hard rock to fine gravel. Typically the trees occur in forests with a thick layer of humus on the surface. The trees are also found in lowland and plateau locations, but mostly occur along well-drained river banks and valleys in humid, moist forest tracts. Valleys with deep sandy soil and high water table support Vateria indica dominated forests at lower elevations. The trees also occur in Myristica swamp forests in Kerala and Karnataka.

== Ecology ==
=== Flowering and pollination ===
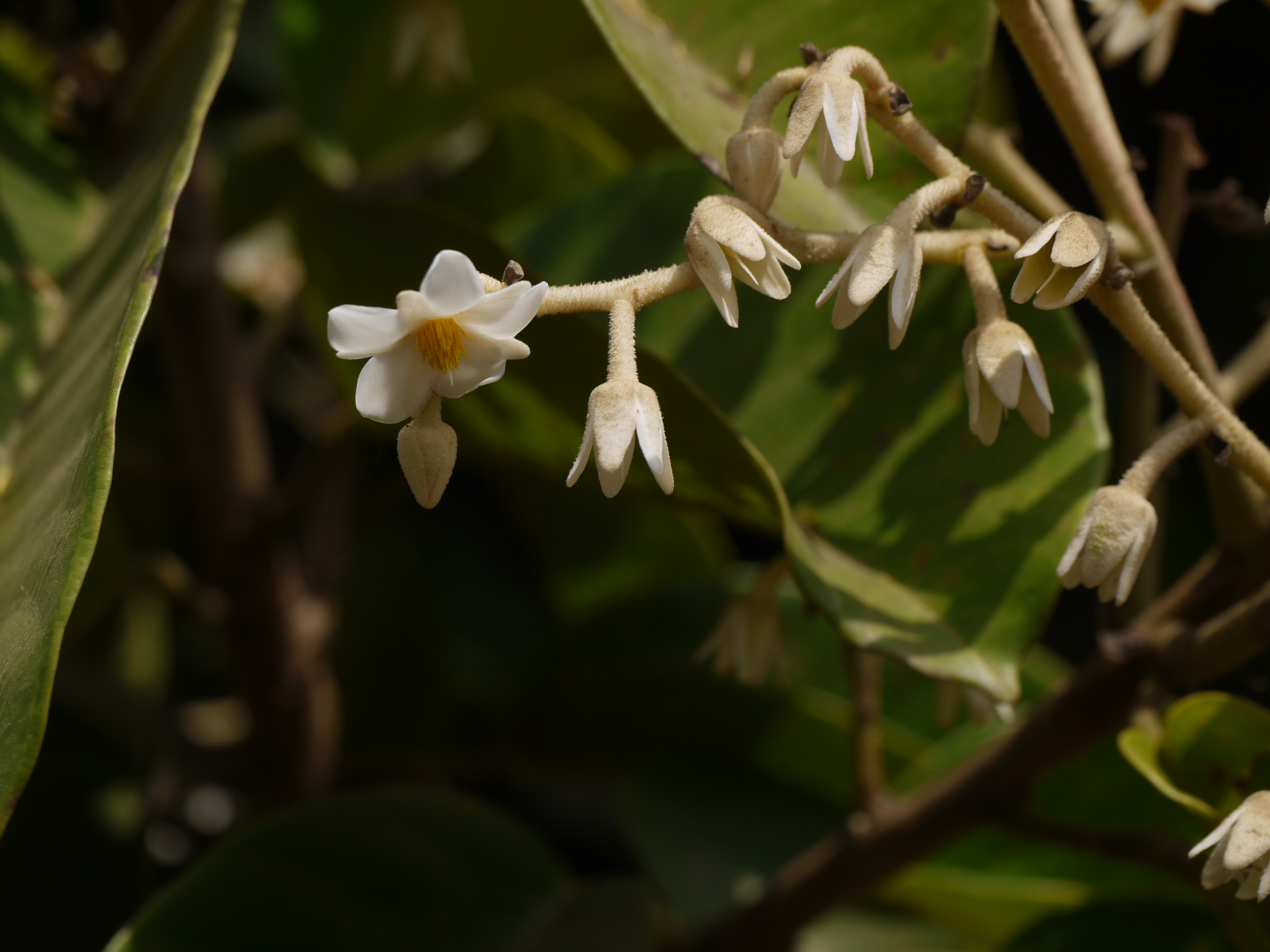
Flowers of Vateria indica

Vateria indica is bee-pollinated. Vateria indica trees in Sringeri in the central Western Ghats flower profusely from late January to early May. The trees flower in alternate years with a mast event occurring every fourth year. The flowers, which open during the day and last only one day, attract generalist nectarivores and pollinators. They are regularly visited by social bees such as Asian honey bee and giant honey bee, and more occasionally by other bees such as Lasioglossum, Ceratina, Tetragonula iridipennis, Xylocopa latipes, Xylocopa rufescens, and Xylocopa verticalis.

=== Fruiting and germination ===
Seeds and seedlings

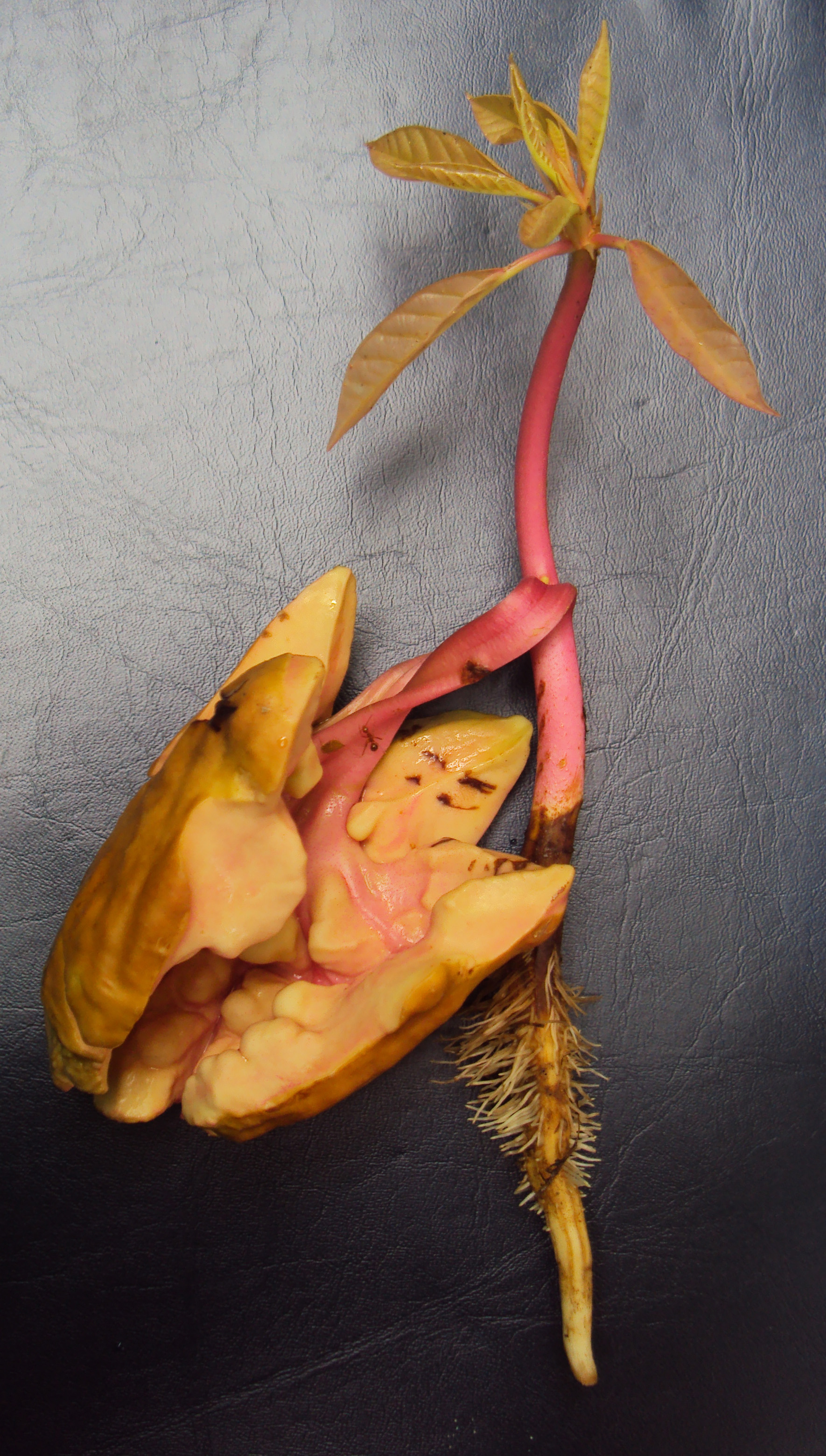
Germinating seed

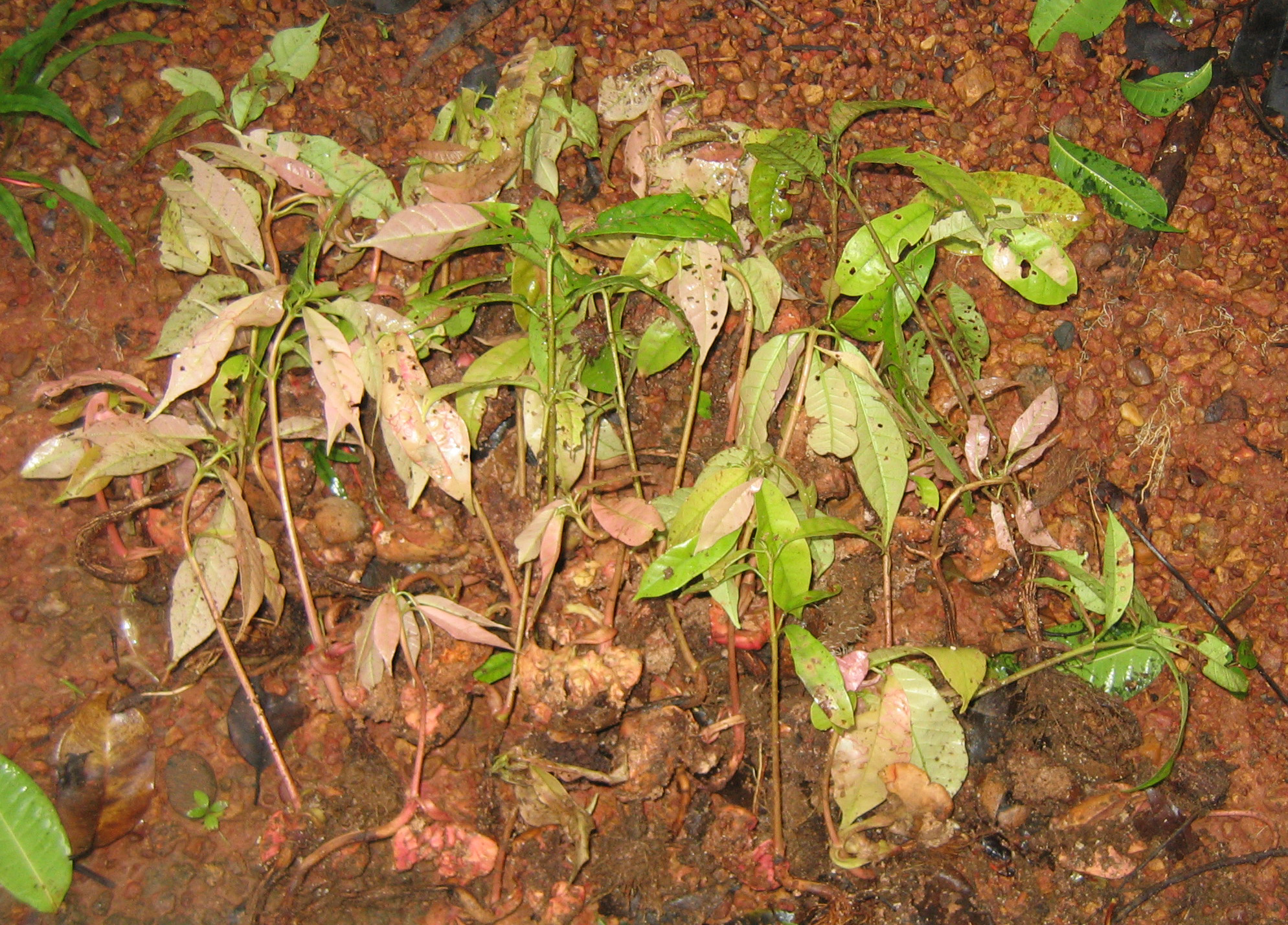
Cluster of seedlings

The trees mainly fruit during the south-west monsoon months between July and September, with fruit fall occurring during periods of downpour towards the end of the monsoon. On the trees, fruits may sometimes show an emerged radicle, indicating vivipary. There is no dormancy as the seeds germinate within 1 to 6 days after they fall, retaining the bulky cotyledons for over one week. A study in Sringeri forests, found that seed germination and seedling growth is affected by seed predators and insect herbivores, particularly the latter. In this area, about 91% fruits were attacked by a curculionid weevil and a scolytid beetle (a borer), with eggs, larvae, pupae, and adults of both predators seen in infected fruits. Nevertheless, seed predation, as determined by damage to the growing plumule was low, seen in only 11% of fruits. The weevil was mainly found in the fibrous pericarp about half the time or in the cotyledons (37%), and less often (13%) in the plumule. The scolytid borer mostly targeted the cotyledon (97%) and minimally affected (3%) the fruit pericarp. While cotyledon attacks did not kill seedlings, plumule-infestation led to mortality of seedlings. Insect herbivores killed around 45% of the seedlings. Two species of sap-sucking ants (Pheidole and Pheidolegeton), a leaf-miner of the Dipteran fly family Tipulidae, and the larvae of a Lymantrid moth were the main seedling herbivores, with herbivory by the latter two taxa (leaf miner and moth) often leading to seedling mortality. No vertebrate seed predators or dispersers have been recorded

=== Plant associations ===
Low-elevation wet forests of the Western Ghats tend to be dominated by dipterocarps, particularly Vateria indica and Dipterocarpus indicus. In the Uppangala forest (300 – 600 m elevation) in Karnataka, Vateria indica is the dominant tree accounting for about 17% of the trees and 29% of the basal area, followed by other species such as Myristica dactyloides, Humboldtia brunonis, and Dipterocarpus indicus.

In Myristica swamp forests in Kerala, they occur with other trees such as Myristica fatua var. magnifica and Syzygium travancoricum, understorey vegetation including Ochlandra bamboos, Pandanus screw pines, and species of aroids, Acanthaceae, and gingers. In Myristica swamps of Karnataka, Vateria indica occurs in forests dominated by trees such as Gymnacranthera farquhariana, Myristica fatua var. magnifica, Mastixia arborea, the dipterocarp Hopea ponga, and the palm Pinanga dicksonii.

=== Fungal associations ===
In the Western Ghats, Vateria indica trees are associated with a number of ectomycorrhizal fungi including Pisolithus indicus and the edible macrofungi Russula adusta and R. atropurpurea. Fungal endophytes also occur in the bark and twigs of Vateria indica. Species such as Coniothyrium sp., along with species of Acremonium, Aspergillus, Colletotrichum, and Penicillium have been reported.

== Uses ==
Uses of Vateria indica find mention in Pharmacographia indica (1890).

Vateria indica wood has been used for making tea-chests, partitions, packing and cordite cases, coffins, boxes, planking, posts, floorings, ceilings, and cabinets, besides bobbins and shuttles in the textile industry, oars for sea-going vessels, and match-splints Large amounts of Vateria indica timber were shipped from the Malabar region to Bombay to be sold as "Malabar White Pine" (Vellapiney), with around 6200 tons of timber used per annum in the late 1960s. The wood, after preservative treatment, was also used for railway sleepers.

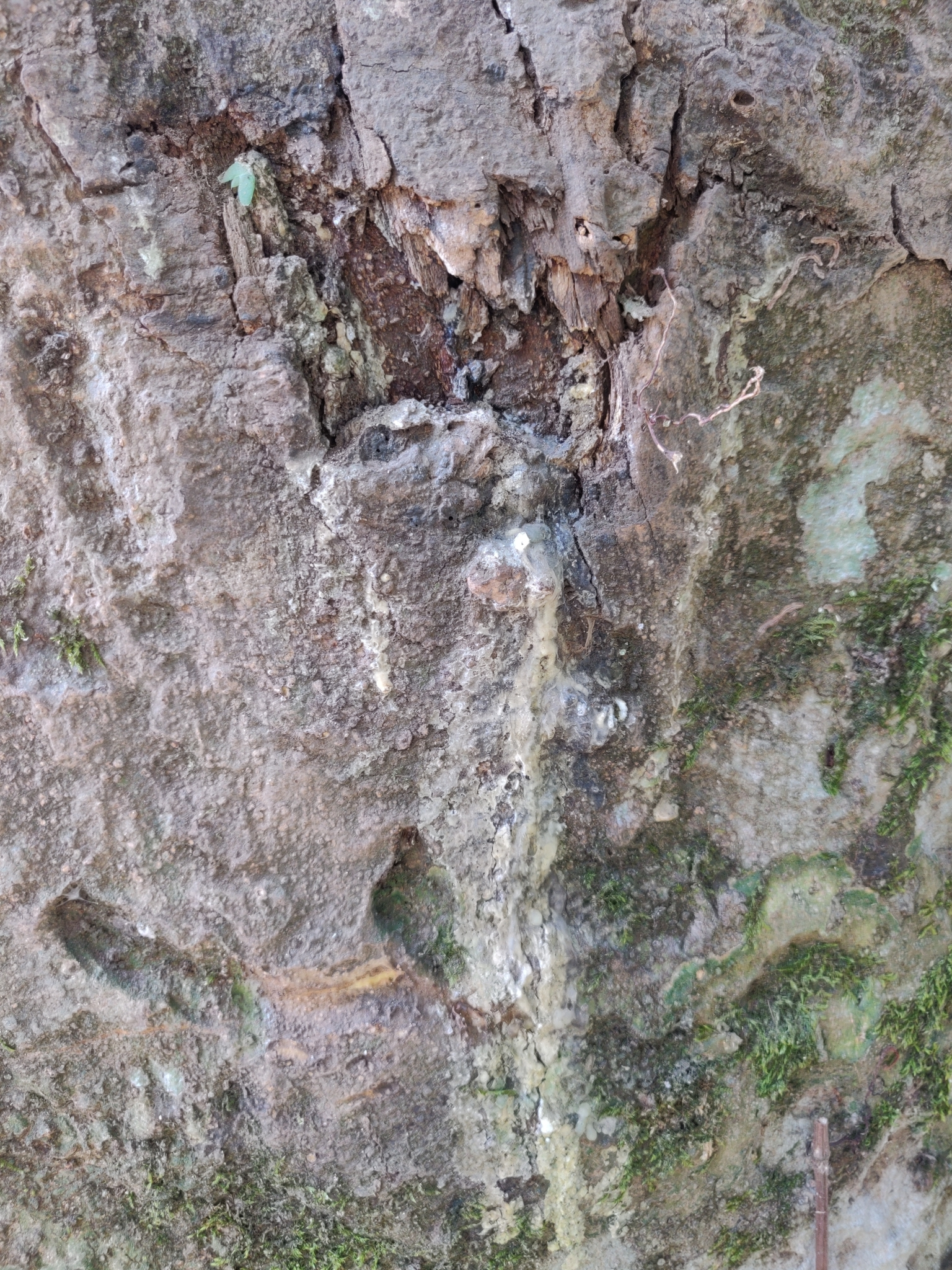
Resin oozing from cut bark

Resin of Vateria indica, extracted by scratching the tree's bark, is called white dammar, also known as "Malabar fallow", "dhupa fat", "Indian Copal", or "piney resin". It is used as incense in India, for incense sticks, and to manufacture candles and soaps. From dried kernels, a fat called "piney tallow" was extracted, which was used to adulterate ghee, making candles and soaps, to treat chronic rheumatism, and for sizing cotton yarn in place of animal tallow. The resin mixed with coconut oil makes an excellent varnish resembling copal. The bark, resin, and leaves are used in Ayurvedic, Siddha, Unani, and folk medicine for the treatment of leprosy, eczema, rheumatism, diarrhoea, and ulcers. Fine shavings of resin are administered internally to check diarrhoea. Vateria indica oil, produced from the seeds, is refined to yield a fat used in confectionery and cosmetics.

=== Experimental assays ===
The bark extract may have potential for treatment of degenerative brain conditions. One study found that young amnesic mice subjected to pre-treatment with ethanol extract of Vateria indica bark gained neuro-protection and enhanced memory. Several stilbenoids (bergenin, hopeaphenol, vaticanol B, vaticanol C, and ε‐viniferin) found in resins (ethanol extract from stem bark of Vateria indica) have been shown to have some in vitro anticancer activity against mouse sarcoma 180 cells by retarding tumor growth when administered in high doses (30 or 100 mg/kg body mass). Experiments on rats also indicate significant reduction of obesity after administration of aqueous extract of stem bark.

== Chemical constituents ==
=== Stem bark ===
From the stem bark of Vateria indica, two novel stilbenoids, vateriaphenols A and B, have been isolated along with ten known stilbenoids and bergenin. The stem bark also contains high phenol and flavonoid content. In one study, the stem bark yielded 670 mg/g and 310 mg/g total phenolic content in ethanolic and aqueous extracts, respectively, while the corresponding total flavonoid content was 74 mg/g and 62 mg/g.

=== Leaves ===
The leaves have yielded two new resveratrol (5E24hydroxyphenylethenylbenzene1,3diol) derivatives, vateriaphenols D and E, along with six known resveratrol oligomers, an isocoumarin bergenin, and a benzophenone. Another study isolated from the leaves a number of compounds: a novel resveratrol dimeric dimer having a C2-symmetric structure (vateriaphenol F), two new O-glucosides of resveratrol oligomers, vateriosides A (resveratrol dimer), vateriosides B (resveratrol tetramer), besides a new natural compound, and 33 known compounds including 26 resveratrol derivatives.

=== Seeds ===
Vateria indica seeds have nearly 19% oil / fat content, with poly-saturated fatty acids like oleic acid (48%) and stearic acid (43%), which has potential for conversion to biodiesel. Optimal oil yield of 22.85% has been noted using the solvent extraction at a temperature of 66.6 °C, extraction time of 4.41 hour, and under a solvent to seed ratio of 1.353 ml/g. Pure, white starch at about 30% yield has been isolated from defatted Vateria indica seed meals.

== Conservation ==
The species was previously listed as Critically Endangered in the IUCN Red List of Threatened Species because of over-exploitation for timber for the plywood industry, habitat loss, and other human activities. A 2020 assessment has placed the species in the Vulnerable category. According to the recent assessment, besides the timber exploitation and extensive habitat loss due to human activities in lowland areas, the species has very restricted seed dispersal, limiting regeneration. Market-driven and intensive harvest of the nuts in recent years is expected to further affect the remaining populations. In Sringeri forests, where subsistence harvest of seeds (for edible oil) has given way to commercial exploitation and trade (for raw materials for oil and paint industry), the abundance of seeds on the forest floor was 96% lower after harvest than before harvest. The quantity of nuts traded in this locality increased from 5 tons in 1999-2000 (at ₹ 0.25/kg) to 820 tons in 2009-2010 (₹ 2.25/kg) and 650 tons in 2011-12 (₹ 2.60/kg), raising concerns on sustainability of harvest and impacts on regeneration of Vateria indica.
