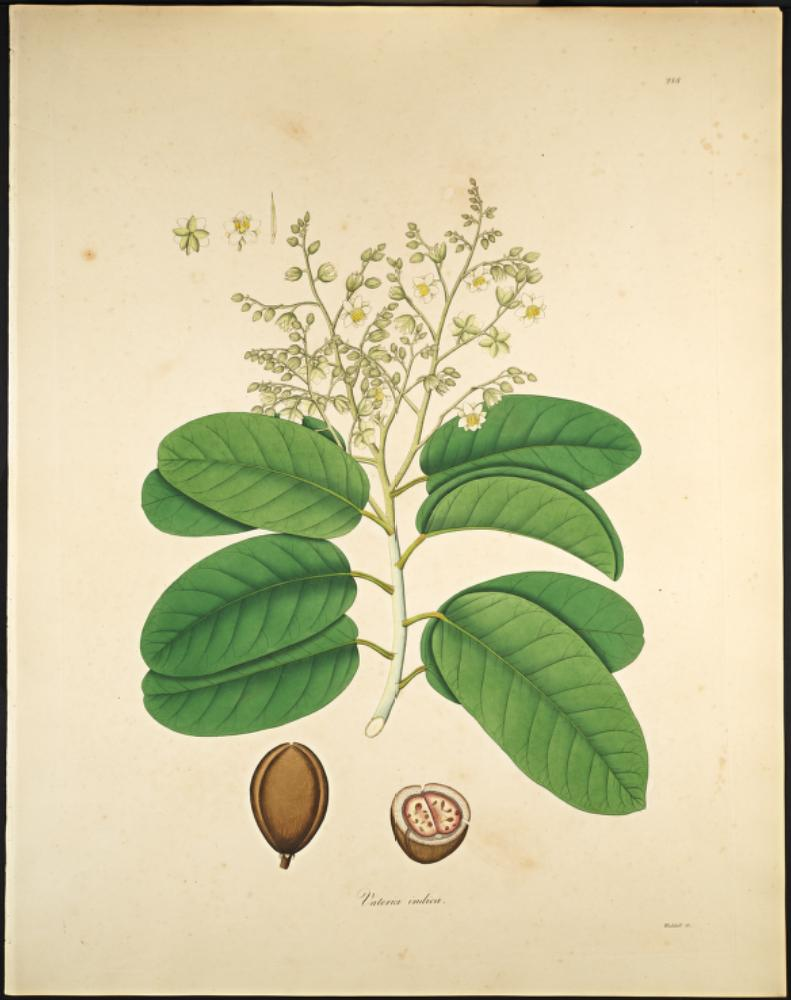
- Vateria indica

Scientific classification
- Kingdom: Plantae
- Clade: Tracheophytes
- Clade: Angiosperms
- Clade: Eudicots
- Clade: Rosids
- Order: Malvales
- Family: Dipterocarpaceae
- Subfamily: Dipterocarpoideae
- Genus: Vateria; L. (1753)

Synonyms
- Dyerella F.Heim (1892); Panoe Adans. (1763), nom. superfl.

= Vateria =

Genus of trees

Vateria is a genus of plants in the family Dipterocarpaceae. It is native to Sri Lanka and India.

== Species ==
Three species are accepted:

- Vateria copallifera (Retz.) Alston
- Vateria indica Linn
- Vateria macrocarpa B.L. Gupta
