= Vateria indica oil =

Oil from the seeds of the Vateria indica plant

Vateria indica oil is extracted from the seeds of the Vateria indica plant, a species in the family Dipterocarpaceae. The Vateria indica plant is indigenous to the Western Ghats, Kerala and Tamil Nadu regions of India. It thrives in the evergreen forests, surviving up to 800 meters above sea level. Oil from the seeds of the plant is extracted through a chemical refining process which makes the plant edible.

== Common names in Indian languages ==
- Sanskrit: Dupa, Kundura, Ajakarna, Sarjaks.
- Hindi: Kharub, Safed Damar, Sundras.

== Kernel ==
Dhupa kernels are approximately 47% of the fruit, with the average kernel weighing 55 grams. The color of the kernel is reddish white or green, and it has a thick brown covering/hull and is hard, brittle, and aromatic. The moisture content in a fresh kernel is about 41-47%; it also contains 19-23% of pale yellow fat/oil having a tallow-like consistency that turns white over time. Kernels are generally dried in sunlight or by steam to enable extraction of the fat/oil, which is generally around 25% of the dried kernel by weight.

== Collection and processing ==
Seeds are collected immediately after the fruit falls to avoid germination in the wet soil or infestation by worms. Seeds are collected by hand and it usually it takes 4–5 weeks for the crop to be collected. The germ is removed by hand and the fruits are decorticated with wooden mallets; the kernels are broken and sterilized in the process. The kernels are dried by agitating them in a layer 4–5 feet deep under the sun in a godown. The kernel is broken up to 6–7 mm size and crushed through an expeller; 8-9% oil is recovered from the seed, then the oil cake is processed by solvent extraction to yield the remaining oil from the oil cake.

== Oil and fat ==
Vateria indica oil is known as piney tallow or dhupa fat. Because Dhupa oil contains more than 55.0% saturated fatty acids, it remains solid at lower temperatures and so is known as fat. The fat contains up to 40-45% stearic acid, 10-13% palmitic acid and 43-48% oleic acid. The linoleic acid content is only 0.5%. Also arachidic acid, a saturated fatty acid with 20 carbons, is present up to 5.0%.

Fatty acid composition

Fatty Acid	Percentage
Myristic acid(C14:0)	0.0-1.0
Palmitic acid(C16:0)	9.7-13.0
Stearic acid(C18:0)	38.0-45.0
Arachidic acid	0.4-4.6
Oleic acid	42.0-48.0
Linoleic acid	0.2-2.3
Linolenic acid	up to 0.5

Dhupa fat is greenish yellow to white, fairly soft with a pleasant odor. It can be bleached by exposure to light.

Specification for dhupa fat

Character	Range
Refractive index at 60^{0}C	1.4577-1.4677
Iodine value	36-51
Saponification value	186-193
Unsaponifiable matter	1.0-2.0
Titer	53^{0}C min

== Uses of oil ==
Refined fat is obtained after chemical conventional refining and is edible. It is used as a component for filling, as a substitute or extender for cocoa butter, after proper processing, and in yarn-sizing and manufacture of candles, soaps and other cosmetics. The fat is also refined for edible use in confectionery and as an adulterant of ghee.

== See also ==
- Vateria indica
- Trees of India
- Incense of India
- Puja (Buddhism)
- Puja (Hinduism)
