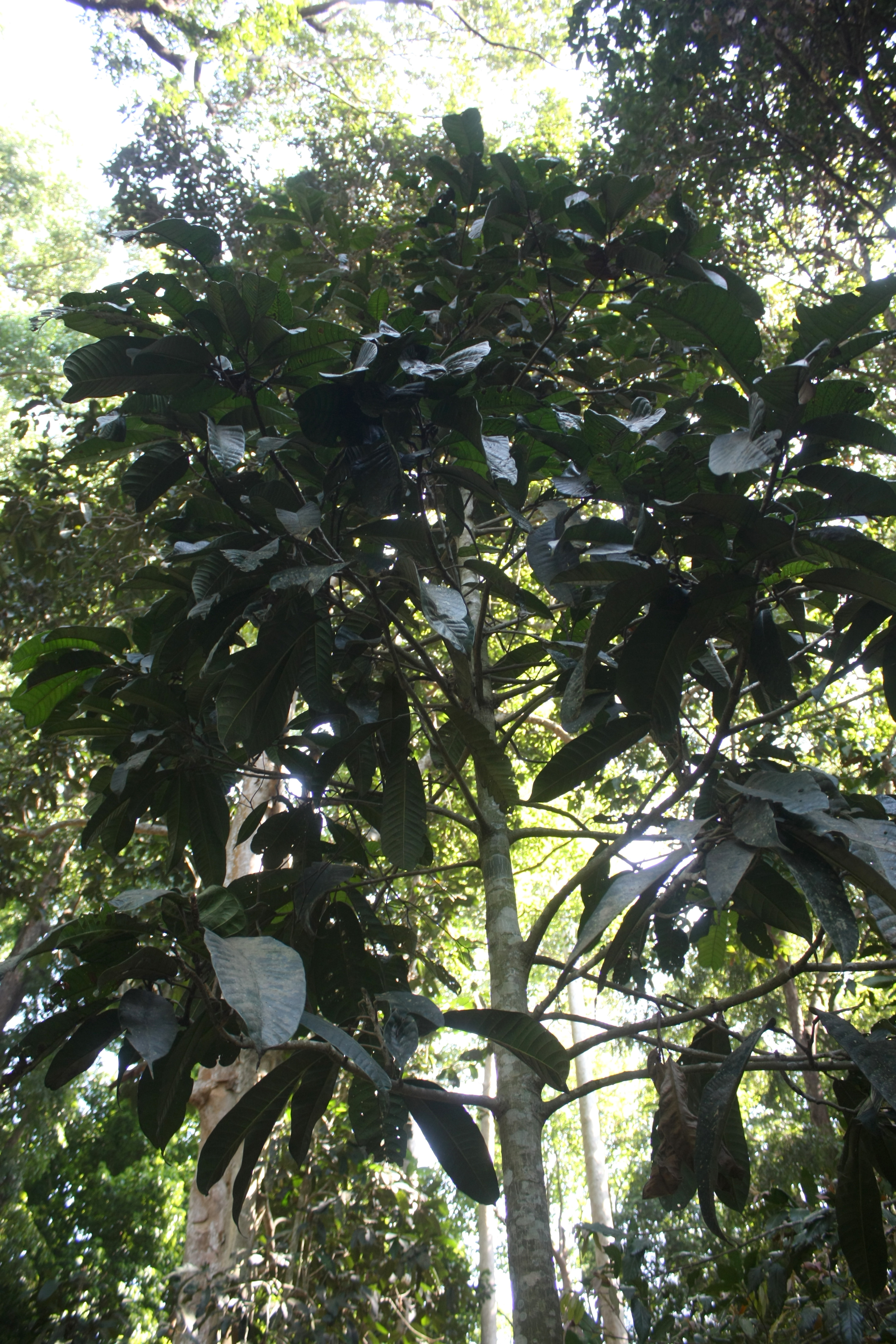

Conservation status
- Near Threatened (IUCN 3.1)

Scientific classification
- Kingdom: Plantae
- Clade: Tracheophytes
- Clade: Angiosperms
- Clade: Eudicots
- Clade: Rosids
- Order: Malvales
- Family: Dipterocarpaceae
- Genus: Vateria
- Species: V. copallifera

Binomial name
- Vateria copallifera (Retz.) Alston

Synonyms
- Elaeocarpus copalliferus Retz.; Hemiphractum oxyandrum Turcz.

= Vateria copallifera =

Species of tree

Vateria copallifera is a species of flowering plant in the family Dipterocarpaceae. It is a tree native to Sri Lanka and Tamil Nadu in southern India. In Sri Lanka it grows in the lowland evergreen rain forests of southwestern Sri Lanka on river banks and along rivulets.

Fruits have a bitter taste. Traditionally people in the surrounding villages of the tree growing areas collect fruits for preparation of various food items including one of famous food called 'Hal Guti'. A preparation made from this tree is used in preserving traditional manuscripts written on palm leaves.

The species was first described as Elaeocarpus copallifer by Anders Jahan Retzius in 1786. In 1931 Arthur Hugh Garfit Alston placed the species in genus Vateria as V. copallifera.

== Culture ==
Known as හල් (hal) in Sinhala.
