= Vateria macrocarpa =

Conservation status
- Critically Endangered (IUCN 3.1)

Scientific classification
- Kingdom: Plantae
- Clade: Tracheophytes
- Clade: Angiosperms
- Clade: Eudicots
- Clade: Rosids
- Order: Malvales
- Family: Dipterocarpaceae
- Genus: Vateria
- Species: V. macrocarpa

Binomial name
- Vateria macrocarpa K.M.Gupta

Species of tree

Vateria macrocarpa is a species of flowering plant in the family Dipterocarpaceae. It is a tree endemic to the Western Ghats of Kerala and Tamil Nadu in southern India. It is a large tree, growing up to 30 metres tall. It is known only from the Attappady Reserved Forest in Kerala and the northern portion of the Bolampatty Reserved Forest Block II in Tamil Nadu, where it grows in submontane evergreen forests and in coffee and cardamom plantations which were formerly part of the evergreen forest from 600 to 1,400 metres elevation.
