= Monotes redheadii =

Conservation status
- Near Threatened (IUCN 3.1)

Scientific classification
- Kingdom: Plantae
- Clade: Tracheophytes
- Clade: Angiosperms
- Clade: Eudicots
- Clade: Rosids
- Order: Malvales
- Family: Dipterocarpaceae
- Genus: Monotes
- Species: M. redheadii

Binomial name
- Monotes redheadii P.A.Duvign.

Species of flowering plant

Monotes redheadii is a species of flowering plant in the family Dipterocarpaceae. It is a tree native to Angola and western Zambia. It is known from two specimens collected in the 1930s, one from near Lusavo Falls in Moxico Province of northeastern Angola and the other from the Matonchi area of Mwinilunga District in northwestern Zambia. It grows in open areas in miombo woodland, often at grassland edges on Kalahari sand, from 1,200 to 1,400 metres elevation. It is typically associated with species of Cryptosepalum, Parinari. and Uapaca.

The species was described by Paul Auguste Duvigneaud in 1959, from specimens collected by Edgar Milne-Redhead in 1938. Duvigneaud thought it may be a naturally-occurring hybrid of M. africanus and M. dasyanthus.
