= Monotes autennei =

Conservation status
- Least Concern (IUCN 3.1)

Scientific classification
- Kingdom: Plantae
- Clade: Tracheophytes
- Clade: Angiosperms
- Clade: Eudicots
- Clade: Rosids
- Order: Malvales
- Family: Dipterocarpaceae
- Genus: Monotes
- Species: M. autennei

Binomial name
- Monotes autennei P.A.Duvign.

Species of flowering plant

Monotes autennei is a species of flowering plant in family Dipterocarpaceae. It is a tree native to the southwestern Democratic Republic of the Congo and western Zambia. It grows up to 17 metres tall. It lives in Miombo woodland, typically mixed high woodland with Marquesia acuminata and M. macroura on grey compact soil, and in fire-induced wooded grassland (chipya) on Kalahari sand, from 1,000 to 1,700 metres elevation.

The species was described by Paul Auguste Duvigneaud in 1958.
