= Monotes hypoleucus =

Conservation status
- Least Concern (IUCN 3.1)

Scientific classification
- Kingdom: Plantae
- Clade: Tracheophytes
- Clade: Angiosperms
- Clade: Eudicots
- Clade: Rosids
- Order: Malvales
- Family: Dipterocarpaceae
- Genus: Monotes
- Species: M. hypoleucus

Binomial name
- Monotes hypoleucus (Welw.) Gilg

Forms and varieties
- Monotes hypoleucus var. angolensis (De Wild.) Meerts; Monotes hypoleucus var. caloneurus (Gilg) Meerts; Monotes hypoleucus f. cordatus (Hutch.) Meerts; Monotes hypoleucus var. discolor (R.E.Fr.) Meerts; Monotes hypoleucus var. hypoleucus; Monotes hypoleucus var. loandensis (Exell) Meerts; Monotes hypoleucus f. oxyphyllinus (P.A.Duvign.) Meerts

Synonyms
- Synonymy: Vatica africana var. hypoleuca Welw. synonyms of var. angolensis: Monotes angolensis De Wild.; Monotes carrissoanus H.H.Bancr.; Monotes hypoleucus f. angolensis Meerts, Rougelot & Sosef; Monotes noldeae H.H.Bancr.; Monotes oblongifolius Hutch. synonyms of var. caloneurus: Monotes caloneurus Gilg; Monotes caloneurus var. dawei (H.H.Bancr.) P.A.Duvign.; Monotes dawei H.H.Bancr.; Monotes elegans Gilg; Monotes schmitzii P.A.Duvign. synonyms of f. cordatus: Monotes caloneurus f. cordatus (Hutch.) P.A.Duvign.; Monotes cordatus Hutch.; Monotes discolor var. cordatus (Hutch.) P.A.Duvign.; Monotes lukuluensis Hutch. synonyms of var. discolor: Monotes discolor R.E.Fr.; Monotes discolor var. lanatus P.A.Duvign.; Monotes hypoleucus f. discolor Meerts, Rougelot & Sosef, nom. illeg. homonym. post. synonyms of var. hypoleucus: Monotes kapiriensis De Wild. synonyms of var. loandensis: Monotes loandensis Exell; Monotes loandensis var. griseotomentosus P.A.Duvign. synonyms of f. oxyphyllinus: Monotes oxyphyllinus P.A.Duvign.

Species of flowering plant

Monotes hypoleucus is a species of flowering plant in the family Dipterocarpaceae. It is a shrub or tree native to south-central Africa, including Angola, the southern Democratic Republic of the Congo, Burundi, Tanzania, Malawi, Zambia, and Zimbabwe. It is variable in form, and as a tree can grow up to 20 metres tall. It grows in semi-evergreen moist miombo woodland and wooded savanna, typically on sandy soils and occasionally on rocky hillsides, from 800 to 1,400 metres elevation. It grows with species of Brachystegia and Berlinia giorgii, Marquesia macroura, and Uapaca nitida.

It was first described as Vatica africana var. hypoleuca by Friedrich Welwitsch in 1869. In 1899 Ernest Friedrich Gilg described it as a full species, Monotes hypoleucus.

Seven forms and varieties are accepted:

- Monotes hypoleucus var. angolensis (De Wild.) Meerts – Angola and DR Congo
- Monotes hypoleucus var. caloneurus (Gilg) Meerts – Angola, Burundi, DR Congo, Tanzania, Zambia, and Zimbabwe
- Monotes hypoleucus f. cordatus (Hutch.) Meerts – Angola, DR Congo, and Zambia
- Monotes hypoleucus var. discolor (R.E.Fr.) Meerts – Angola, DR Congo, Malawi, and Zambia
- Monotes hypoleucus var. hypoleucus – Angola and DR Congo
- Monotes hypoleucus var. loandensis (Exell) Meerts – Angola and DR Congo
- Monotes hypoleucus f. oxyphyllinus (P.A.Duvign.) Meerts – southern and southwestern DR Congo
