= Dry miombo woodlands =

Ecoregion in Africa

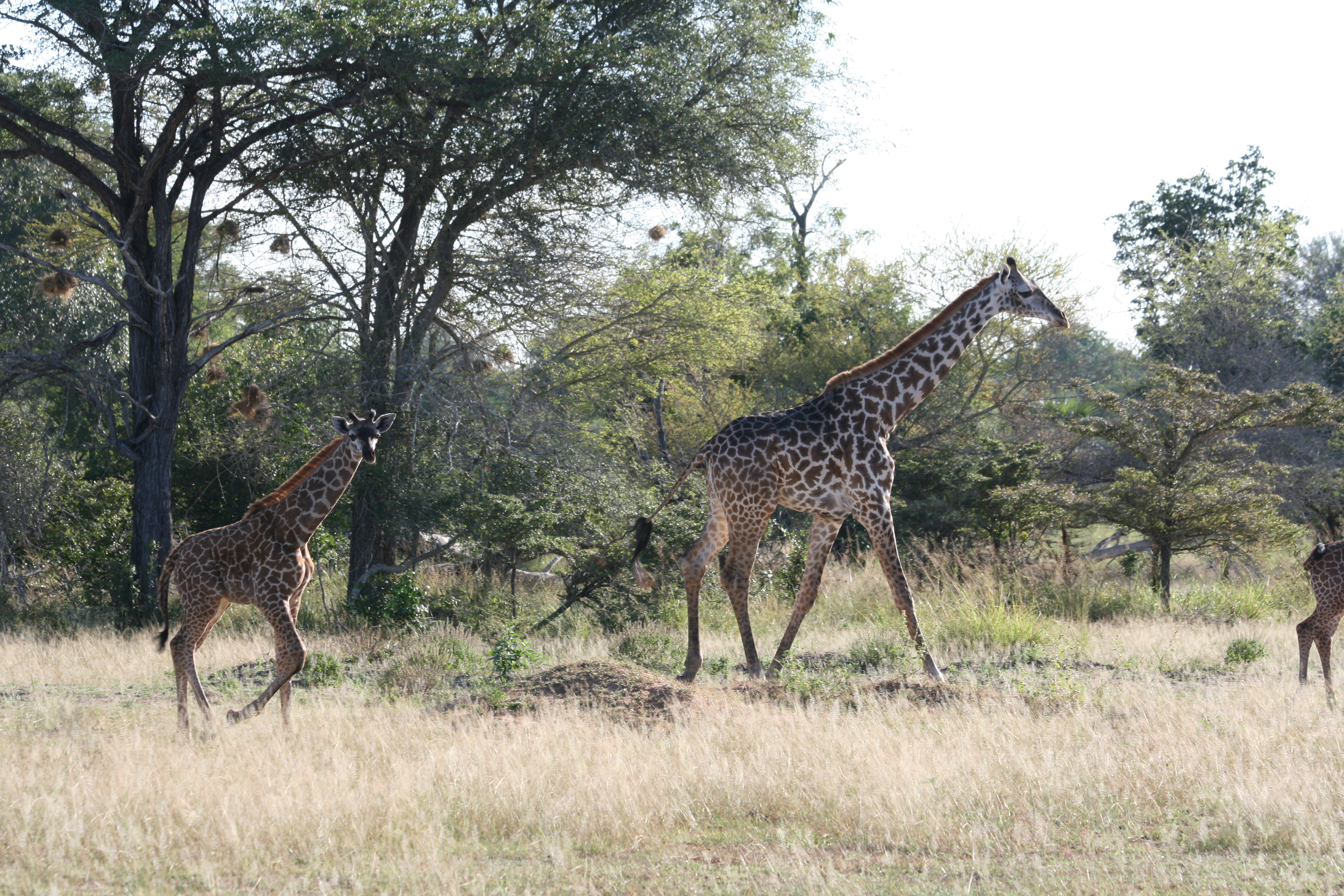
- Giraffes in the Selous Game Reserve, Tanzania

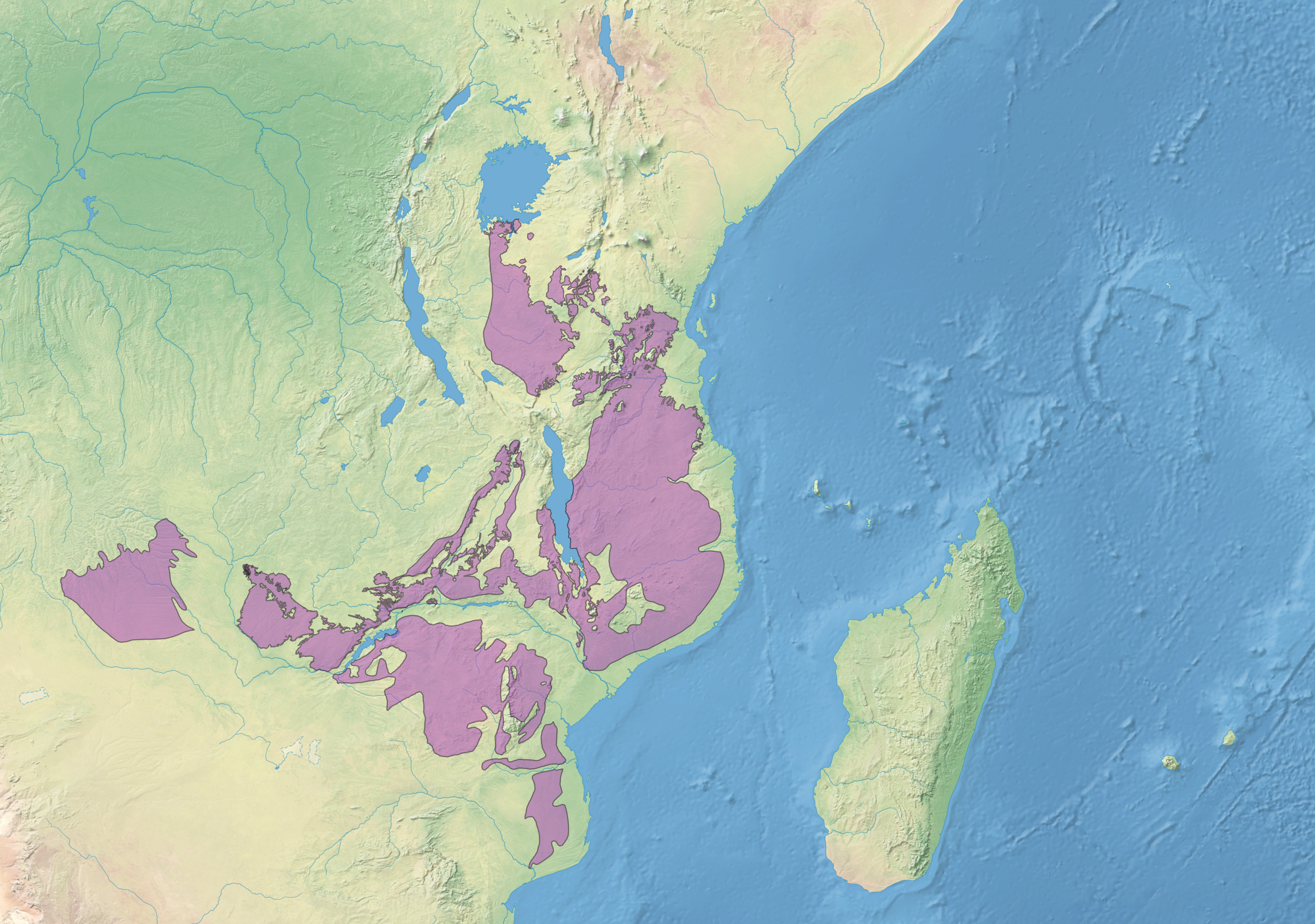
- Map of Dry Miombo Woodlands Ecoregion

Ecology
- Realm: Afrotropical
- Biome: Tropical and subtropical grasslands, savannas, and shrublands
- Borders: List: Angolan wet miombo woodlands; Central Zambezian wet miombo woodlands; East African halophytics; Eastern Arc forests; Itigi–Sumbu thicket; Limpopo lowveld; Maputaland coastal forests and woodlands; Mulanje montane forest–grassland; Northern Swahili coastal forests and woodlands; Nyanga–Chimanimani montane forest–grassland; Southern Acacia–Commiphora bushland; Southern Rift montane forest–grassland; Southern Swahili coastal forests and woodlands; Victoria Basin forest–savanna; Zambezian flooded grasslands; Zambezian coastal flooded savanna; Zambezian evergreen dry forests; Zambezian–Limpopo mixed woodlands; Zambezian mopane woodlands; Zambezian Baikiaea woodlands

Geography
- Area: 1,185,632 km^{2} (457,775 sq mi)
- Countries: List: Angola; Malawi; Mozambique; Tanzania; Zimbabwe; Zambia
- Rivers: Congo, Cuanza, Cunene, Limpopo, Okavango, Pangani, Rufiji, Ruvuma, and Save, and Zambezi

Conservation
- Protected: 291,385 km^{2} (25%)

The dry miombo woodlands is an ecoregion in Africa. It has an area of 1,185,632 square kilometres (457,775 sq mi), covering portions of Tanzania, Mozambique, Malawi, Zambia, Zimbabwe, and Angola.

== Climate ==
The dry miombo woodlands have a seasonal tropical climate. Average annual rainfall ranges from 600 to 1,000 mm. The woodlands have a summer rainy season from November to April, when the Inter-Tropical Convergence Zone (ITCZ) moves over the region and brings moisture-bearing northeasterly winds. The May to October dry season is cooler, dominated by southeasterly trade winds. In central and northern Tanzania, which are closer to the equator, the rainfall pattern is more bimodal, with a long, more intense wet season from March to May and a shorter, less intense wet season from October to December.

== Flora ==
Dry miombo is an open woodland of mostly deciduous trees, typically less than 15 meters tall with 30 to 60% cover. There shrubs and saplings form a discontinuous understory along with scattered understory trees, and grasses, forbs and subshrubs at ground level. Small seasonally-wet grasslands, known as dambos, grow in areas with poor drainage, and riverine forests grow along rivers. Termite mounds and rock outcrops support distinct plant communities.

Species of Brachystegia (miombo) and Julbernardia, mainly Brachystegia spiciformis and Julbernardia globiflora, are the predominant trees in miombo woodland. Other common tree species are Uapaca kirkiana, Brachystegia boehmii, Monotes glaber, Faurea saligna, and Combretum molle. Other associated trees include species of Aganope, Afzelia, Burkea, Erythrophleum, Ficus, Monotes, Pterocarpus, Swartzia, and Uapaca.

== Fauna ==
The dry miombo woodlands are home to large mammals, including African bush elephant (Loxodonta africana), black rhinoceros (Diceros bicornis), African buffalo (Syncerus caffer), plains zebra (Equus quagga), greater kudu (Tragelaphus strepsiceros), common eland (Taurotragus oryx), and Sharpe's grysbok (Raphicerus sharpei), and the carnivores lion (Panthera leo), leopard (Panthera pardus), spotted hyena (Crocuta crocuta), and African wild dog (Lycaon pictus). Many grazing species rely on adjacent ecoregions, whether forests or flooded grasslands, to provide seasonal food, water, and/or shelter during dry season droughts and fires.

The ecoregion is rich in bird species, with few endemic species. Stierling's woodpecker (Dendropicos stierlingi) is a near-endemic species, native to the eastern dry miombo woodlands of southern Tanzania, southwestern Malawi, and northern Mozambique. Other native birds include the corn crake (Crex crex), lesser kestrel (Falco naumanni), and the threatened Cape vulture (Gyps coprotheres).

== Conservation ==
291,385 square kilometres (112,504 sq mi), or 25%, of the dry miombo woodlands is in protected areas. Protected areas include Mavinga National Park in Angola, Niassa Reserve in Mozambique, Nyerere National Park and Selous Game Reserve in Tanzania, and Sioma Ngwezi National Park in Zambia.
