= Monotes engleri =

Conservation status
- Least Concern (IUCN 3.1)

Scientific classification
- Kingdom: Plantae
- Clade: Tracheophytes
- Clade: Angiosperms
- Clade: Eudicots
- Clade: Rosids
- Order: Malvales
- Family: Dipterocarpaceae
- Genus: Monotes
- Species: M. engleri

Binomial name
- Monotes engleri Gilg

Synonyms
- Monotes tomentellus Hutch. & Milne-Redh.

Species of flowering plant

Monotes engleri is a species of flowering plant in the family Dipterocarpaceae. It is a shrub or tree native to Angola, Malawi, Mozambique, Zambia, and Zimbabwe. It grows up to 10 metres tall. It grows in dry and moderate-rainfall miombo woodland from 800 to 1,300 metres elevation.

The species was described by Ernest Friedrich Gilg in 1908.
