= Monotes pearsonii =

Conservation status
- Vulnerable (IUCN 3.1)

Scientific classification
- Kingdom: Plantae
- Clade: Tracheophytes
- Clade: Angiosperms
- Clade: Eudicots
- Clade: Rosids
- Order: Malvales
- Family: Dipterocarpaceae
- Genus: Monotes
- Species: M. pearsonii

Binomial name
- Monotes pearsonii H.H.Bancr.

Species of flowering plant

Monotes pearsonii is a species of flowering plant in the family Dipterocarpaceae. It is a shrub or tree native to south-central Africa, ranging from southern Democratic Republic of the Congo to southern Angola. It is the sole dipterocarp species native to Madagascar. It grows up to 6 metres tall. It grows in miombo woodland, typically on wooded slopes with shallow rocky soils, from 1,520 to 1,785 metres elevation. Associated trees include miombo (mainly genus Brachystegia) and other species of Monotes. Little is known of the species' current population status. The IUCN Red List assesses the species as Vulnerable.

The species was described by Nellie Bancroft in 1936.
