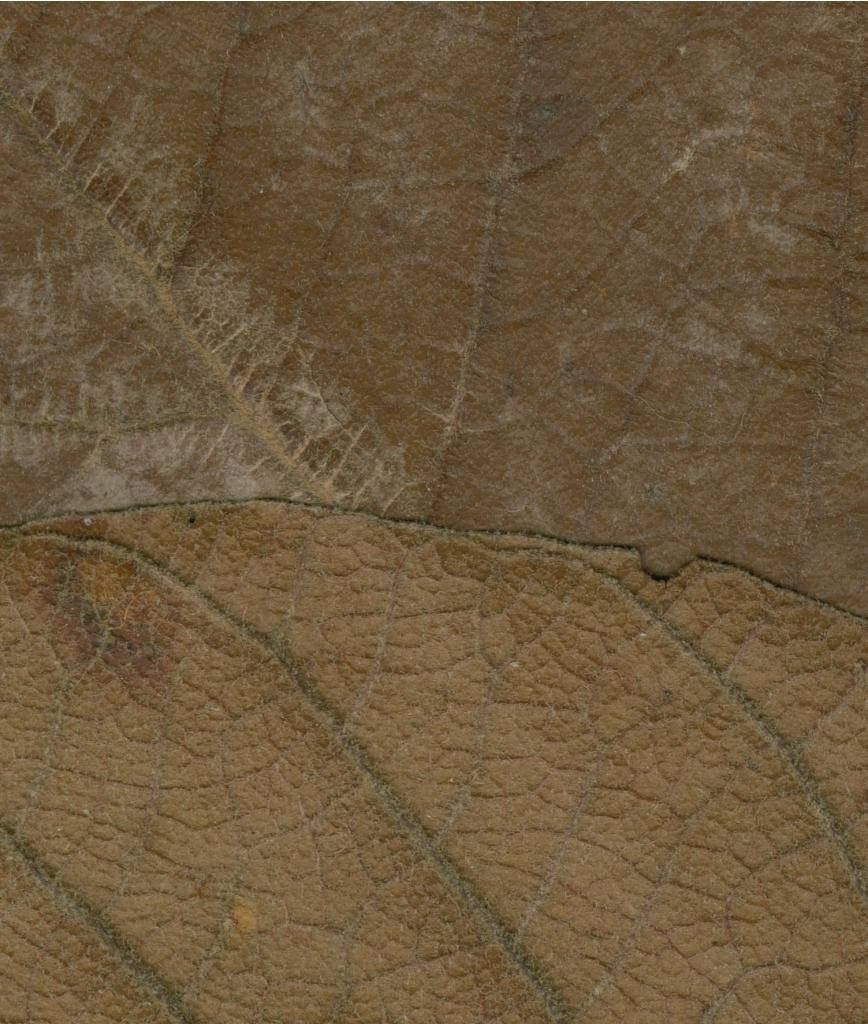
- Leaves

Conservation status
- Least Concern (IUCN 3.1)

Scientific classification
- Kingdom: Plantae
- Clade: Tracheophytes
- Clade: Angiosperms
- Clade: Eudicots
- Clade: Rosids
- Order: Malvales
- Family: Dipterocarpaceae
- Genus: Monotes
- Species: M. adenophyllus

Binomial name
- Monotes adenophyllus Gilg

Subdivisions
- Monotes adenophyllus var. adenophyllus; Monotes adenophyllus f. albidus (P.A.Duvign.) Meerts; Monotes adenophyllus var. homblei (De Wild.) Meerts

Synonyms
- Synonymy: synonyms of var. adenophyllus: Monotes adenophyllus subsp. delevoyi (De Wild.) P.A.Duvign.; Monotes adenophyllus subsp. subfloccosus P.A.Duvign.; Monotes delevoyi De Wild.; Monotes gilgii Engl.; Monotes hutchinsonianus Exell; Monotes magnificus var. glabrescens P.A.Duvign.; Monotes magnificus var. paucipilosus P.A.Duvign.; Monotes pwetoensis Robyns ex H.H.Bancr.; Monotes stevensonii Burtt Davy ex H.H.Bancr.; Monotes verdickii De Wild. synonyms of f. albidus: Monotes magnificus var. albidus P.A.Duvign. synonyms of var. homblei: Monotes adenophyllus subsp. homblei (De Wild.) P.A.Duvign.; Monotes adenophyllus f. homblei Meerts, Rougelot & Sosef; Monotes homblei De Wild.; Monotes magnificus var. homblei (De Wild.) P.A.Duvign.

= Monotes adenophyllus =

Species of flowering plant

Monotes adenophyllus is a species of flowering plant in the family Dipterocarpaceae. It is a shrub or tree native to south-central Africa, where it ranges from western and southwestern Tanzania through northern Zambia and the southern Democratic Republic of the Congo to northern Angola. As a small tree it grows from 4 to 8 (12) metres tall. It grows in miombo woodland and bushy or wooded savanna, often on shallow rocky or lateritic soils, from 840 to 1,500 metres elevation.

Three subdivisions are accepted:

- Monotes adenophyllus var. adenophyllus – western and southwestern Tanzania, northern Zambia, southern Democratic Republic of the Congo, and northern Angola
- Monotes adenophyllus f. albidus (P.A.Duvign.) Meerts – southern Democratic Republic of the Congo
- Monotes adenophyllus var. homblei (De Wild.) Meerts – western Tanzania, northern Zambia, southern Democratic Republic of the Congo, and northern Angola
