= Monotes rufotomentosus =

Conservation status
- Endangered (IUCN 3.1)

Scientific classification
- Kingdom: Plantae
- Clade: Tracheophytes
- Clade: Angiosperms
- Clade: Eudicots
- Clade: Rosids
- Order: Malvales
- Family: Dipterocarpaceae
- Genus: Monotes
- Species: M. rufotomentosus

Binomial name
- Monotes rufotomentosus Gilg

Species of flowering plant

Monotes rufotomentosus is a species of flowering plant in the family Dipterocarpaceae. It is a small tree endemic to central and southwestern Tanzania. It known only from the Udzungwa Mountains in south-central Madagascar, where it grows in montane miombo woodland from 1,680 to 1,700 metres elevation. The species is threatened from habitat loss and degradation from deforestation for charcoal burning. The IUCN Red List assesses the species as Endangered.

The species was described by Ernest Friedrich Gilg in 1899.
