= Monotes magnificus =

Conservation status
- Least Concern (IUCN 3.1)

Scientific classification
- Kingdom: Plantae
- Clade: Tracheophytes
- Clade: Angiosperms
- Clade: Eudicots
- Clade: Rosids
- Order: Malvales
- Family: Dipterocarpaceae
- Genus: Monotes
- Species: M. magnificus

Binomial name
- Monotes magnificus Gilg

Subspecies
- Monotes magnificus var. gigantophyllus (P.A.Duvign.) Meerts; Monotes magnificus var. magnificus

Synonyms
- synonyms of var. gigantophyllus: Monotes gigantophyllus P.A.Duvign.; synonyms of var. magnificus: Monotes magnificus var. eupilosus P.A.Duvign.; Monotes magnificus var. wangenheimianus (Gilg) P.A.Duvign.; Monotes thomasii De Wild.; Monotes wangenheimianus Gilg

Species of flowering plant

Monotes magnificus is a species of flowering plant in the family Dipterocarpaceae. It is a shrub or tree native to the southern Democratic Republic of the Congo, Malawi, western and southwestern Tanzania, and Zambia in south-central Africa. It grows up to 8 metres tall. It grows in miombo woodland, wooded savanna, grassy savanna, steppe-savanna, scrub, and at the edges of mineralized clearings and dambos (shallow wetlands) from 900 to 2,200 metres elevation.

The species was described by Ernest Friedrich Gilg in 1899. Two varieties are accepted:

- Monotes magnificus var. gigantophyllus (P.A.Duvign.) Meerts – It is a tortuose low shrub, up to 3 metres tall. It is endemic to southeastern DR Congo, where grows in open miombo woodland, wooded savanna, grassy savanna, and dambos. It is threatened by habitat loss from agricultural expansion and mining.
- Monotes magnificus var. magnificus – southern DR Congo, Malawi, western and southwestern Tanzania, and Zambia

The IUCN Red List assesses the species as Least Concern. Variety magnificus is also assessed as Least Concern. Variety gigantophyllus is assessed as Vulnerable.
