= Monotes xasenguensis =

Conservation status
- Data Deficient (IUCN 3.1)

Scientific classification
- Kingdom: Plantae
- Clade: Tracheophytes
- Clade: Angiosperms
- Clade: Eudicots
- Clade: Rosids
- Order: Malvales
- Family: Dipterocarpaceae
- Genus: Monotes
- Species: M. xasenguensis

Binomial name
- Monotes xasenguensis H.H.Bancr.

Species of flowering plant

Monotes xasenguensis is a species of flowering plant in the family Dipterocarpaceae. It is a tree native to northeastern Angola. It known from a single collection made in Lunda Sul Province in 1937. It grows in dry miombo woodland from 1,280 to 1,300 metres elevation.

The species was described by Nellie Bancroft in 1939.
