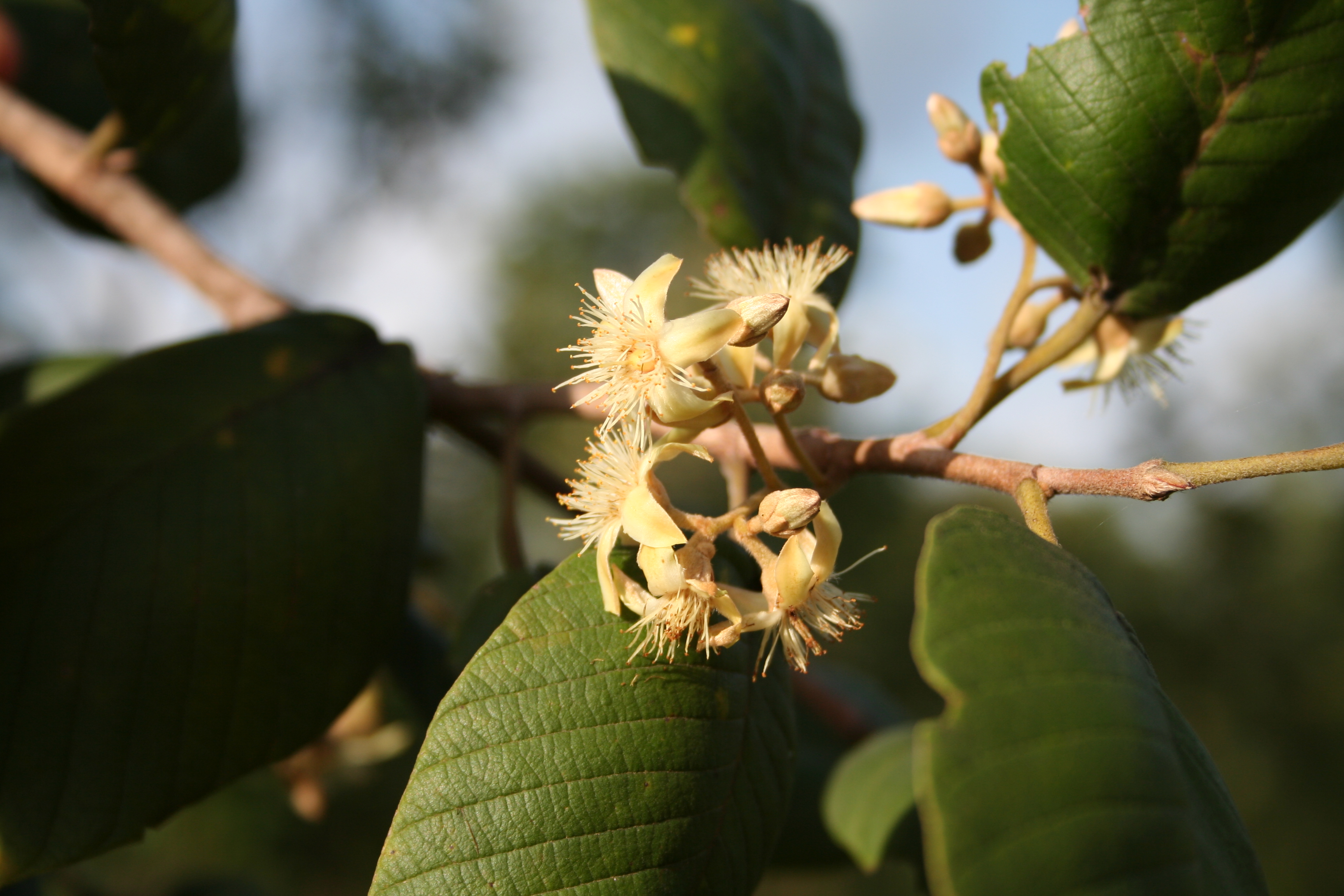

Conservation status
- Least Concern (IUCN 3.1)

Scientific classification
- Kingdom: Plantae
- Clade: Embryophytes
- Clade: Tracheophytes
- Clade: Angiosperms
- Clade: Eudicots
- Clade: Rosids
- Order: Malvales
- Family: Dipterocarpaceae
- Genus: Monotes
- Species: M. kerstingii

Binomial name
- Monotes kerstingii Gilg

Synonyms
- Caraipa africana Oliv.

= Monotes kerstingii =

Species of flowering plant

Monotes kerstingii is a species of flowering plant in the family Dipterocarpaceae. It is a shrub or small tree native to western and central tropical Africa, ranging from Guinea to South Sudan. It grows up to 16 metres tall in open seasonally-dry forest or wooded savanna.
