= Monotes rubriglans =

Conservation status
- Vulnerable (IUCN 3.1)

Scientific classification
- Kingdom: Plantae
- Clade: Tracheophytes
- Clade: Angiosperms
- Clade: Eudicots
- Clade: Rosids
- Order: Malvales
- Family: Dipterocarpaceae
- Genus: Monotes
- Species: M. rubriglans

Binomial name
- Monotes rubriglans H.H.Bancr.

Subspecies and varieties
- Monotes rubriglans var. griseocoriaceus Meerts; Monotes rubriglans subsp. rubriglans; Monotes rubriglans subsp. upembensis Meerts

Synonyms
- synonyms of subsp. upembensis: Monotes rubriglans var. upembensis Meerts, Rougelot & Sosef

Species of flowering plant

Monotes rubriglans is a species of flowering plant in the family Dipterocarpaceae. It is a tree native to central and southern Angola and the southern Democratic Republic of the Congo. It is a small tree up to 7 metres tall. It grows in miombo woodland, wooded savanna, and savanna from 600 to 1,600 metres elevation.

The species was described by Nellie Bancroft in 1937. One variety and two subspecies are accepted.

- Monotes rubriglans var. griseocoriaceus Meerts
- Monotes rubriglans subsp. rubriglans
- Monotes rubriglans subsp. upembensis Meerts
