= Monotes doryphorus =

Conservation status
- Vulnerable (IUCN 3.1)

Scientific classification
- Kingdom: Plantae
- Clade: Tracheophytes
- Clade: Angiosperms
- Clade: Eudicots
- Clade: Rosids
- Order: Malvales
- Family: Dipterocarpaceae
- Genus: Monotes
- Species: M. doryphorus

Binomial name
- Monotes doryphorus P.A.Duvign.

Species of flowering plant

Monotes doryphorus is a species of flowering plant in the family Dipterocarpaceae. It is a tree endemic to the southeastern Democratic Republic of the Congo. It grows up to 12 metres tall. It grows in miombo woodland, wooded savanna, bushy savanna, fire-induced wooded grassland (chypia), and degraded forest from 600 to 1,400 metres elevation. It often grows on rocky slopes of kibarian shale but can grow on various other soil types.

The species was described by Paul Auguste Duvigneaud in 1958.
