= Monotes dasyanthus =

Conservation status
- Least Concern (IUCN 3.1)

Scientific classification
- Kingdom: Plantae
- Clade: Tracheophytes
- Clade: Angiosperms
- Clade: Eudicots
- Clade: Rosids
- Order: Malvales
- Family: Dipterocarpaceae
- Genus: Monotes
- Species: M. dasyanthus

Binomial name
- Monotes dasyanthus Gilg

Subdivisions
- Monotes dasyanthus var. dasyanthus; Monotes dasyanthus var. heterotrichus Meerts; Monotes dasyanthus var. mutetetwa (P.A.Duvign.) Meerts; Monotes dasyanthus f. sericeus (P.A.Duvign.) Meerts

Species of flowering plant

Monotes dasyanthus is a species of flowering plant in the family Dipterocarpaceae. It is a tree native to Angola, the southwestern Democratic Republic of the Congo, and Zambia. It grows from 4 to 10 (–15) metres tall. It grows in a range of dry forest and savanna habitats including mixed dry forests, wooded savanna, transitional savanna at the edges of clearings, miombo woodland, and semi-evergreen mixed forest (mavunda forest).
