= Monotes duvigneaudii =

Conservation status
- Endangered (IUCN 3.1)

Scientific classification
- Kingdom: Plantae
- Clade: Tracheophytes
- Clade: Angiosperms
- Clade: Eudicots
- Clade: Rosids
- Order: Malvales
- Family: Dipterocarpaceae
- Genus: Monotes
- Species: M. duvigneaudii

Binomial name
- Monotes duvigneaudii Meerts

Varieties
- Monotes duvigneaudii var. concolor Meerts; Monotes duvigneaudii var. duvigneaudii

Species of flowering plant

Monotes doryphorus is a species of flowering plant in the family Dipterocarpaceae. It is a tree endemic to the southern Democratic Republic of the Congo. It a small tree up to 5 metres tall. It grows in miombo woodland, shrub savanna, and herbaceous savanna from 900 to 1,400 metres elevation.

The species was described by Pierre Meerts in 2017. Two varieties are accepted:

- Monotes duvigneaudii var. concolor Meerts
- Monotes duvigneaudii var. duvigneaudii

The IUCN Red List assesses the species as Endangered. Varieties concolor and duvigneaudii are separately endorsed as Critically Endangered.
