= Monotes hirtii =

Conservation status
- Endangered (IUCN 3.1)

Scientific classification
- Kingdom: Plantae
- Clade: Tracheophytes
- Clade: Angiosperms
- Clade: Eudicots
- Clade: Rosids
- Order: Malvales
- Family: Dipterocarpaceae
- Genus: Monotes
- Species: M. hirtii

Binomial name
- Monotes hirtii P.A.Duvign.

Species of flowering plant

Monotes hirtii is a species of flowering plant in the family Dipterocarpaceae. It is a small tree endemic to the southern Democratic Republic of the Congo. It grows in open miombo woodland and wooded savanna, mostly on rocky slopes and shallow rocky soil, and rarely on deep sandy soil, from 1,200 to 1,500 metres elevation.

The species was described by Paul Auguste Duvigneaud in 1958.
