= Monotes katangensis =

Conservation status
- Least Concern (IUCN 3.1)

Scientific classification
- Kingdom: Plantae
- Clade: Tracheophytes
- Clade: Angiosperms
- Clade: Eudicots
- Clade: Rosids
- Order: Malvales
- Family: Dipterocarpaceae
- Genus: Monotes
- Species: M. katangensis

Binomial name
- Monotes katangensis (De Wild.) De Wild.

Synonyms
- Vatica africana var. glomerata Oliv.; Vatica katangensis De Wild.; Monotes glandulosissimus Hutch.; Monotes obliquinervis Hutch.

Species of flowering plant

Monotes katangensis is a species of flowering plant in the family Dipterocarpaceae. It is a shrub or tree native to the Democratic Republic of the Congo, Tanzania, Mozambique, and Zambia in south-central Africa. It grows up to 14 metres tall. It grows in miombo woodland, on hillsides and rocky outcrops, from 780 to 1,400 metres elevation.

The species was first described as Vatica katangensis by Émile Auguste Joseph De Wildeman in 1902. In 1913 De Wildeman placed the species in genus Monotes as M. katangensis.
