= Monotes glaber =

Conservation status
- Least Concern (IUCN 3.1)

Scientific classification
- Kingdom: Plantae
- Clade: Tracheophytes
- Clade: Angiosperms
- Clade: Eudicots
- Clade: Rosids
- Order: Malvales
- Family: Dipterocarpaceae
- Genus: Monotes
- Species: M. glaber

Binomial name
- Monotes glaber Sprague

Synonyms
- Vatica africana var. glabra Oliv.

Species of flowering plant

Monotes glaber is a species of flowering plant in the family Dipterocarpaceae. It is a tree native to south-central Africa, ranging from the southern Democratic Republic of the Congo through Angola, Zambia, and Zimbabwe to northern Botswana. It grows from 3 to 10 metres tall. It is widespread in miombo woodland on sandy soil.

The species was described by Thomas Archibald Sprague in 1909.
