= Monotes glandulosus =

Conservation status
- Data Deficient (IUCN 3.1)

Scientific classification
- Kingdom: Plantae
- Clade: Tracheophytes
- Clade: Angiosperms
- Clade: Eudicots
- Clade: Rosids
- Order: Malvales
- Family: Dipterocarpaceae
- Genus: Monotes
- Species: M. glandulosus

Binomial name
- Monotes glandulosus Pierre

Species of flowering plant

Monotes glandulosus is a species of flowering plant in the family Dipterocarpaceae. It is a tree endemic to Angola. It is known from a single record, and little is known about its population or habitat.

The species was described by Jean Baptiste Louis Pierre in 1897.
