= Monotes lutambensis =

Conservation status
- Endangered (IUCN 2.3)

Scientific classification
- Kingdom: Plantae
- Clade: Embryophytes
- Clade: Tracheophytes
- Clade: Angiosperms
- Clade: Eudicots
- Clade: Rosids
- Order: Malvales
- Family: Dipterocarpaceae
- Genus: Monotes
- Species: M. lutambensis

Binomial name
- Monotes lutambensis Verdc.

Species of tree

Monotes lutambensis is a species of flowering plant in the family Dipterocarpaceae. It is a tree endemic to southern Tanzania. It is known only from the Litipo Reserve Forest near Lake Lutamba in Lindi Region.
