= Monotes paivae =

Conservation status
- Endangered (IUCN 3.1)

Scientific classification
- Kingdom: Plantae
- Clade: Tracheophytes
- Clade: Angiosperms
- Clade: Eudicots
- Clade: Rosids
- Order: Malvales
- Family: Dipterocarpaceae
- Genus: Monotes
- Species: M. paivae

Binomial name
- Monotes paivae Catarino & E.S.Martins

Species of flowering plant

Monotes paivae is a species of flowering plant in the family Dipterocarpaceae. It is a tree endemic to Angola. It is a small tree up to 7 metres tall. It known only from the Bié Province in central Angola, where it grows in submontane miombo woodland and open forest from 1,300 to 1,600 elevation. The species has a small range, and it is threatened by habitat loss and degradation from expansion of agriculture, livestock grazing, and settlements. The IUCN Red List assesses the species as Endangered.

The species was described by Luis Catarino and Eurico Sampaio Martins in 2013.
