= Marquesia =

Scientific classification
- Kingdom: Plantae
- Clade: Tracheophytes
- Clade: Angiosperms
- Clade: Eudicots
- Clade: Rosids
- Order: Malvales
- Family: Dipterocarpaceae
- Subfamily: Monotoideae
- Genus: Marquesia; Gilg

Synonyms
- Trillesanthus Pierre; Trillesianthus Pierre ex A.Chev.

Genus of trees

Marquesia is a genus of plant in family Dipterocarpaceae. It is native to Africa and can be found in Angola, Equatorial Guinea, Gabon, Tanzania, Zambia, Zaïre and Zimbabwe.

It contains the following species:

- Marquesia acuminata (Gilg) R.E.Fr
- Marquesia excelsa R.E.Fr.
- Marquesia macroura Gilg

The genus name of Marquesia is in honour of L. Marques, who was a Portuguese plant collector hunting in Angola and Mozambique.

The genus was circumscribed by Ernst Friedrich Gilg in Bot. Jahrb. Syst. vol.40 on page 485 in 1908.
