= Monotes madagascariensis =

Conservation status
- Endangered (IUCN 3.1)

Scientific classification
- Kingdom: Plantae
- Clade: Tracheophytes
- Clade: Angiosperms
- Clade: Eudicots
- Clade: Rosids
- Order: Malvales
- Family: Dipterocarpaceae
- Genus: Monotes
- Species: M. madagascariensis

Binomial name
- Monotes madagascariensis Humbert

Species of flowering plant

Monotes madagascariensis is a species of flowering plant in the family Dipterocarpaceae. It is a tree endemic to Madagascar. It is the sole dipterocarp species native to Madagascar. It is a small tree 3 to 8 metres tall. It known only from the Isalo Massif in south-central Madagascar, where it grows in subhumid forest and dry semi-deciduous forest from 500 to 1500 elevation. The species' habitat is threatened by fires, logging, and urbanization, and its population is declining. The IUCN Red List assesses the species as Endangered.

The species was described by Jean-Henri Humbert in 1944.
