= Marquesia excelsa =

Conservation status
- Least Concern (IUCN 3.1)

Scientific classification
- Kingdom: Plantae
- Clade: Embryophytes
- Clade: Tracheophytes
- Clade: Angiosperms
- Clade: Eudicots
- Clade: Rosids
- Order: Malvales
- Family: Dipterocarpaceae
- Genus: Marquesia
- Species: M. excelsa

Binomial name
- Marquesia excelsa R.E.Fr.

Synonyms
- Trillesanthus excelsus Pierre

Species of flowering plant

Marquesia excelsa is a species of flowering plant in the family Dipterocarpaceae. It is a large tree, up to 50 metres (160 ft) tall, which is native to Gabon and mainland Equatorial Guinea. It grows in lowland rain forests, often in hollows near rivers.

The species was first described by Robert Elias Fries in 1914.
