= Pseuderanthemum dispersum =

Conservation status
- Vulnerable (IUCN 3.1)

Scientific classification
- Kingdom: Plantae
- Clade: Tracheophytes
- Clade: Angiosperms
- Clade: Eudicots
- Clade: Asterids
- Order: Lamiales
- Family: Acanthaceae
- Genus: Pseuderanthemum
- Species: P. dispersum

Binomial name
- Pseuderanthemum dispersum Milne-Redh.

Species of flowering plant

Pseuderanthemum dispersum is a species of plant in the family Acanthaceae. It is found in Cameroon and Nigeria. Its natural habitat is subtropical or tropical moist lowland forests. It is threatened by habitat loss.
