= Marquesia acuminata =

Conservation status
- Least Concern (IUCN 3.1)

Scientific classification
- Kingdom: Plantae
- Clade: Tracheophytes
- Clade: Angiosperms
- Clade: Eudicots
- Clade: Rosids
- Order: Malvales
- Family: Dipterocarpaceae
- Genus: Marquesia
- Species: M. acuminata

Binomial name
- Marquesia acuminata (Gilg) R.E.Fr.

Synonyms
- Marquesia noldeae Mildbr.; Monotes acuminatus Gilg (1896) (basionym); Monotes gilletii De Wild.; Trillesanthus acuminatus (Gilg) Sosef

Species of flowering plant

Marquesia acuminata is a species of flowering plant in the family Dipterocarpaceae. It is a tree native to northern Angola, the southern Democratic Republic of the Congo, and western Zambia.

It is a large buttressed tree which grows 15 to 28 metres tall. It is native to wet miombo (Brachystegia) woodland, mixed gallery forest, and dry evergreen Cryptosepalum forest on loamy Kalahari sands, from 500 to 1,500 metres elevation.

The species was first described as Monotes acuminatus by Ernest Friedrich Gilg in 1896. In 1914 Robert Elias Fries placed the species in genus Marquesia as M. acuminata.
