= Begonia pseudoviola =

Conservation status
- Endangered (IUCN 3.1)

Scientific classification
- Kingdom: Plantae
- Clade: Tracheophytes
- Clade: Angiosperms
- Clade: Eudicots
- Clade: Rosids
- Order: Cucurbitales
- Family: Begoniaceae
- Genus: Begonia
- Species: B. pseudoviola

Binomial name
- Begonia pseudoviola Gilg

Synonyms
- Begonia subtilis Irmsch.

Species of flowering plant

Begonia pseudoviola is a species of flowering plant in the family Begoniaceae. It is found in Cameroon and Nigeria. Its natural habitat is subtropical or tropical moist lowland forests. It is threatened by habitat loss.
