= Monotes africanus =

Conservation status
- Least Concern (IUCN 3.1)

Scientific classification
- Kingdom: Plantae
- Clade: Tracheophytes
- Clade: Angiosperms
- Clade: Eudicots
- Clade: Rosids
- Order: Malvales
- Family: Dipterocarpaceae
- Genus: Monotes
- Species: M. africanus

Binomial name
- Monotes africanus A.DC.

Synonyms
- Monotes africanus var. denudans (Welw.) Hiern; Monotes nyasensis Hutch. ex H.H.Bancr., not validly publ.; Vatica africana (A.DC.) Welw. ex Oliv.; Vatica africana var. denudans Welw.; Vatica africana var. laxa Oliv.

Species of flowering plant

Monotes africanus is a species of flowering plant in the family Dipterocarpaceae. It is a shrub or small tree, up to 8 metres tall, which is native to central and southern tropical Africa. It ranges from Tanzania and Mozambique to Malawi, Zambia, the Democratic Republic of the Congo, and Angola. It grows in miombo woodland and savanna on a variety of soils from 60 to 1,900 metres elevation. It is a common tree in miombo woodland, sometimes dominant and forming pure stands.

Miombo woodlands are threatened by clearance for firewood, charcoal production, and expansion of agriculture. The IUCN Red List assesses the species as Least Concern.

The species was described by Alphonse Pyramus de Candolle in 1868.
