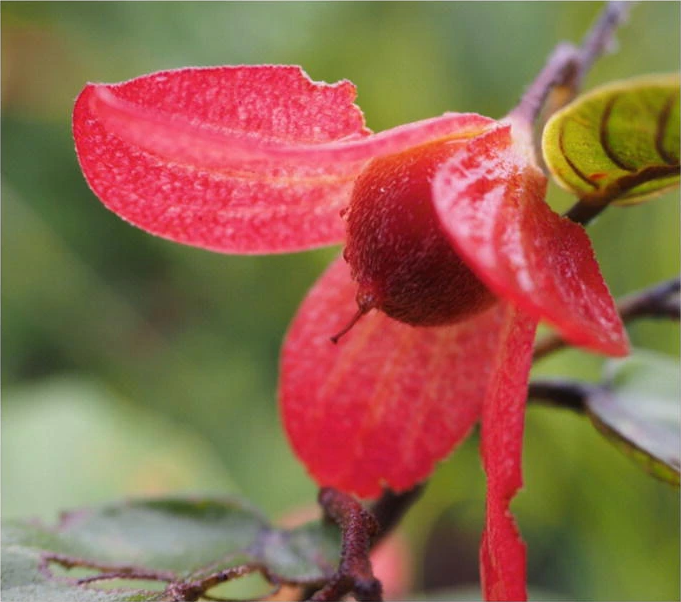

Conservation status
- Least Concern (IUCN 3.1)

Scientific classification
- Kingdom: Plantae
- Clade: Embryophytes
- Clade: Tracheophytes
- Clade: Angiosperms
- Clade: Eudicots
- Clade: Rosids
- Order: Malvales
- Family: Dipterocarpaceae
- Genus: Monotes
- Species: M. gossweileri

Binomial name
- Monotes gossweileri De Wild.

= Monotes gossweileri =

Species of flowering plant

Monotes gossweileri is a species of flowering plant in the family Dipterocarpaceae. It is a subshrub, shrub, or tree up to 4 metres tall which is endemic to Cuando Cubango, Lunda Sul, and Moxico provinces of east-central Angola. It grows in scrub or open woodland on sandy soils in miombo woodland from 1,000 to 1,300 metres elevation, where it can form large patches.

The species was described by Émile Auguste Joseph De Wildeman in 1927.
