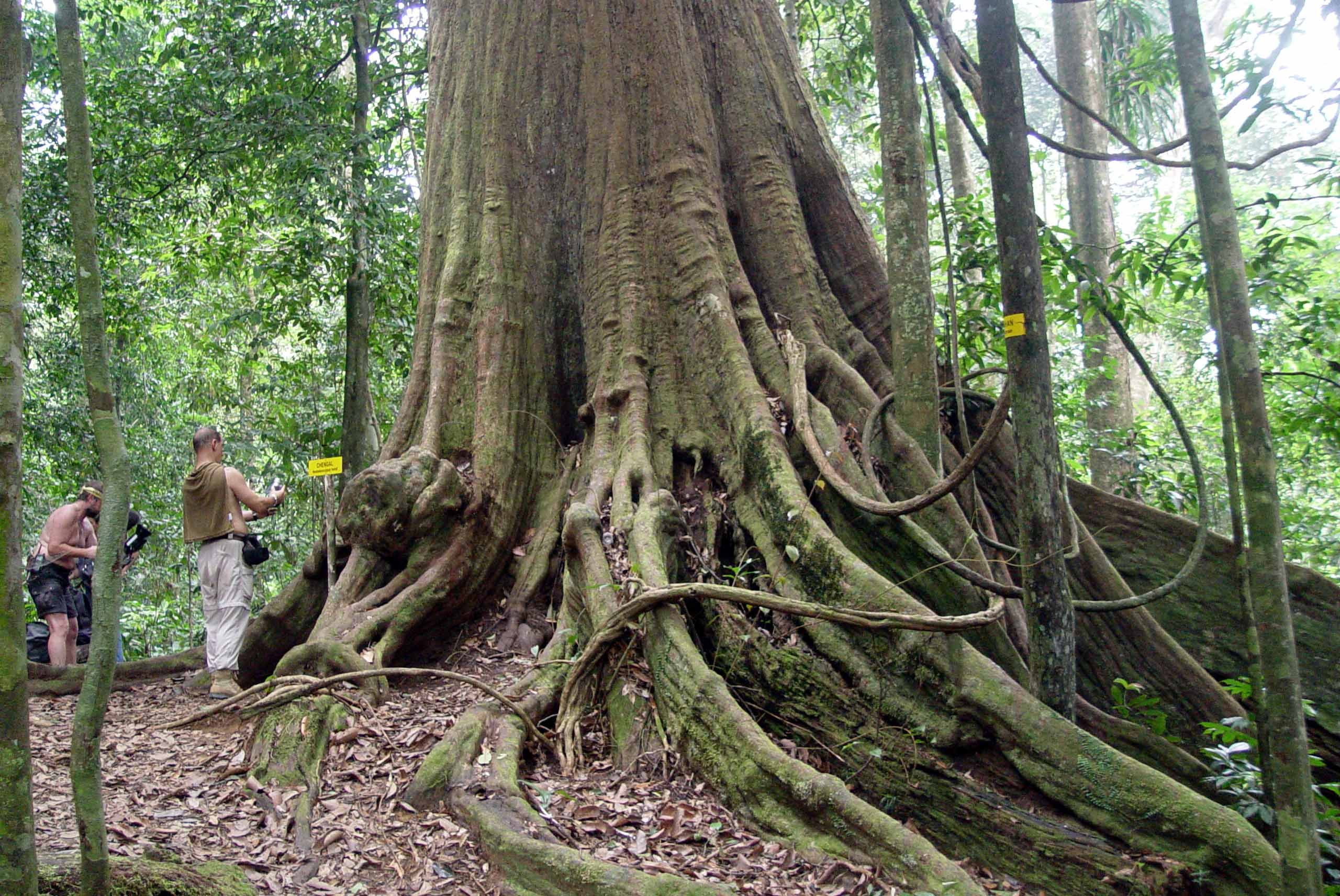

Conservation status
- Endangered (IUCN 3.1)

Scientific classification
- Kingdom: Plantae
- Clade: Embryophytes
- Clade: Tracheophytes
- Clade: Angiosperms
- Clade: Eudicots
- Clade: Rosids
- Order: Malvales
- Family: Dipterocarpaceae
- Tribe: Shoreae
- Genus: Neobalanocarpus; P.S.Ashton
- Species: N. heimii

Binomial name
- Neobalanocarpus heimii (King) P.S.Ashton

Synonyms
- Balanocarpus heimii King; Balanocarpus wrayi King; Pierrea penangiana F.Heim ex Brandis

= Neobalanocarpus =

Genus of tropical trees

Neobalanocarpus is a monotypic genus of plants in the family Dipterocarpaceae. The single species, Neobalanocarpus heimii, is a tropical hardwood tree. Common names for the tree and its wood products include chengal, chan ta khien, chi-ngamat, takian chan, and takian chantamaeo. The tree grows over 60 m (197 ft) tall. Chengal is considered the number one wood (classified as heavy hardwood) of Malaysia and export of logs is prohibited due to its scarcity. The species is listed as endangered on the IUCN Red list.

== Distribution ==
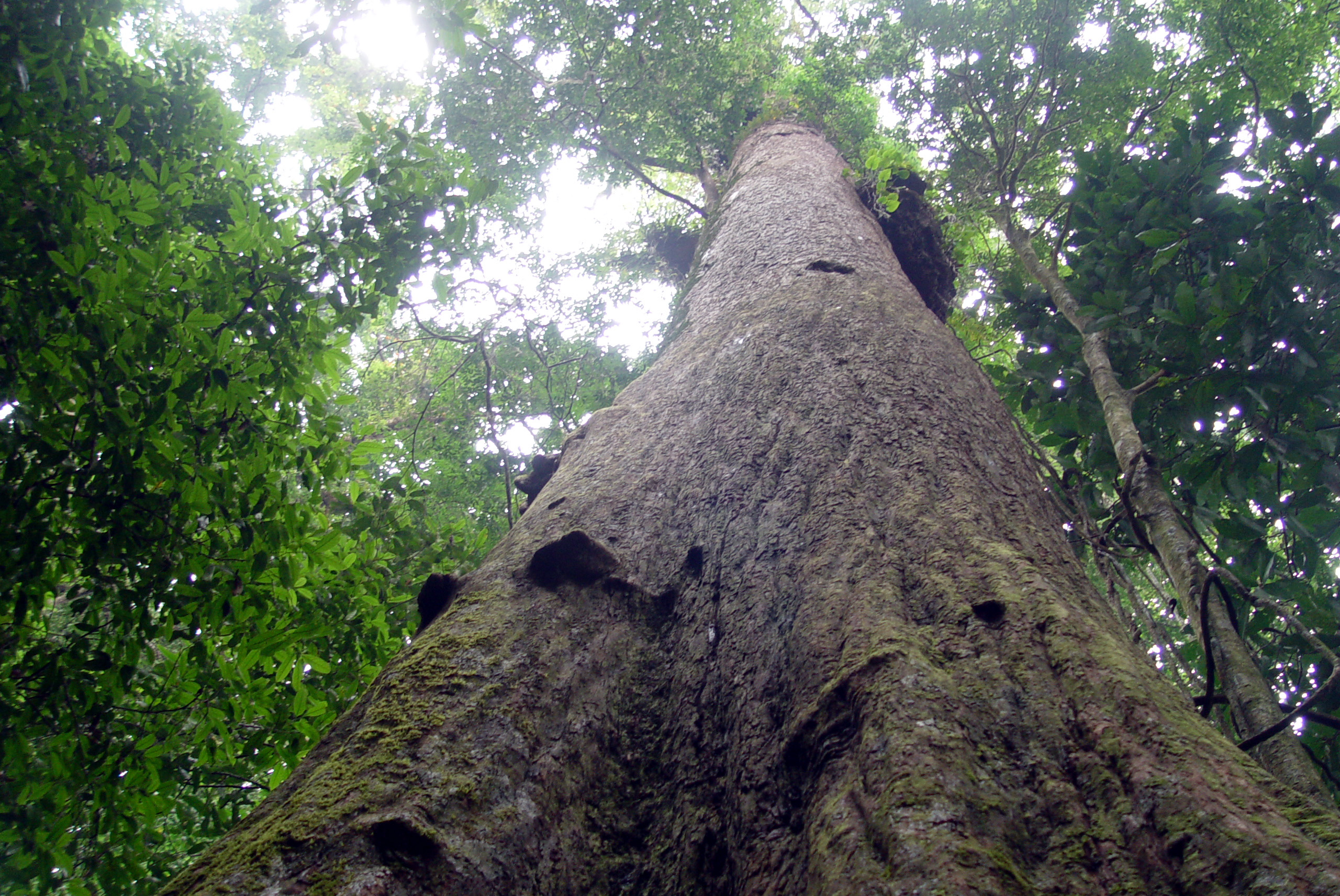
Chengal tree, Peninsular Malaysia, 2005

Neobalanocarpus heimii is endemic to the Malay Peninsula and grows under quite a range of conditions of soils and topography in Peninsular Malaysia (and southern Thailand) from low flat semi-swamp to hills, but appears to thrive best on undulating land with light sandy soils. See Wildlife of Malaysia. It is now extinct in Singapore, and possibly extinct in Thailand.

== Description ==
Neobalanocarpus heimii can grow to be a large tree over 60 metres tall, with a straight, unbranched trunk, averaging 90 cm in diameter, and with obvious supporting buttresses. Its simple, leathery leaves are arranged alternately, and are elliptical to lanceolate, between 7 and 17 cm in length, and 2.5 and 5 cm in width. The largest tree in peninsular Malaysia is a Neobalanocarpus heimii at the Pasir Raja Forest Reserve in Dungan, Malaysia which is 65 metres (213 ft) height and 16.75 m (55.0 ft) girth, with buttresses up to 10.6 m (35 ft) long and 7.6 m (25 ft) high.

It is widespread in mixed dipterocarp forests, growing to altitudes up to 1,000 metres (3,300 ft), preferring soils that are friable and well-drained land.

== Uses ==
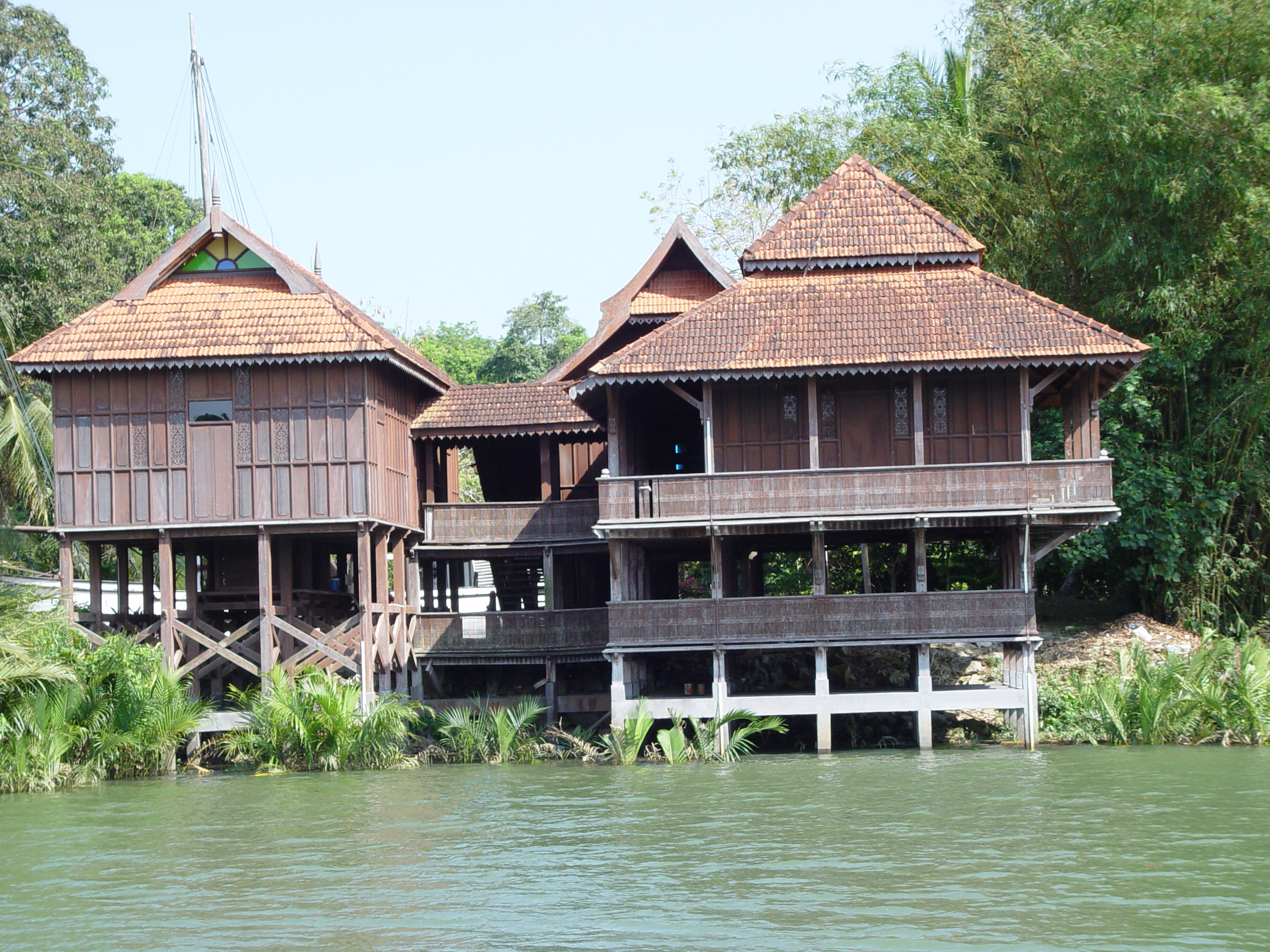
Chengal house in the museum in Kuala Terengganu, 2005

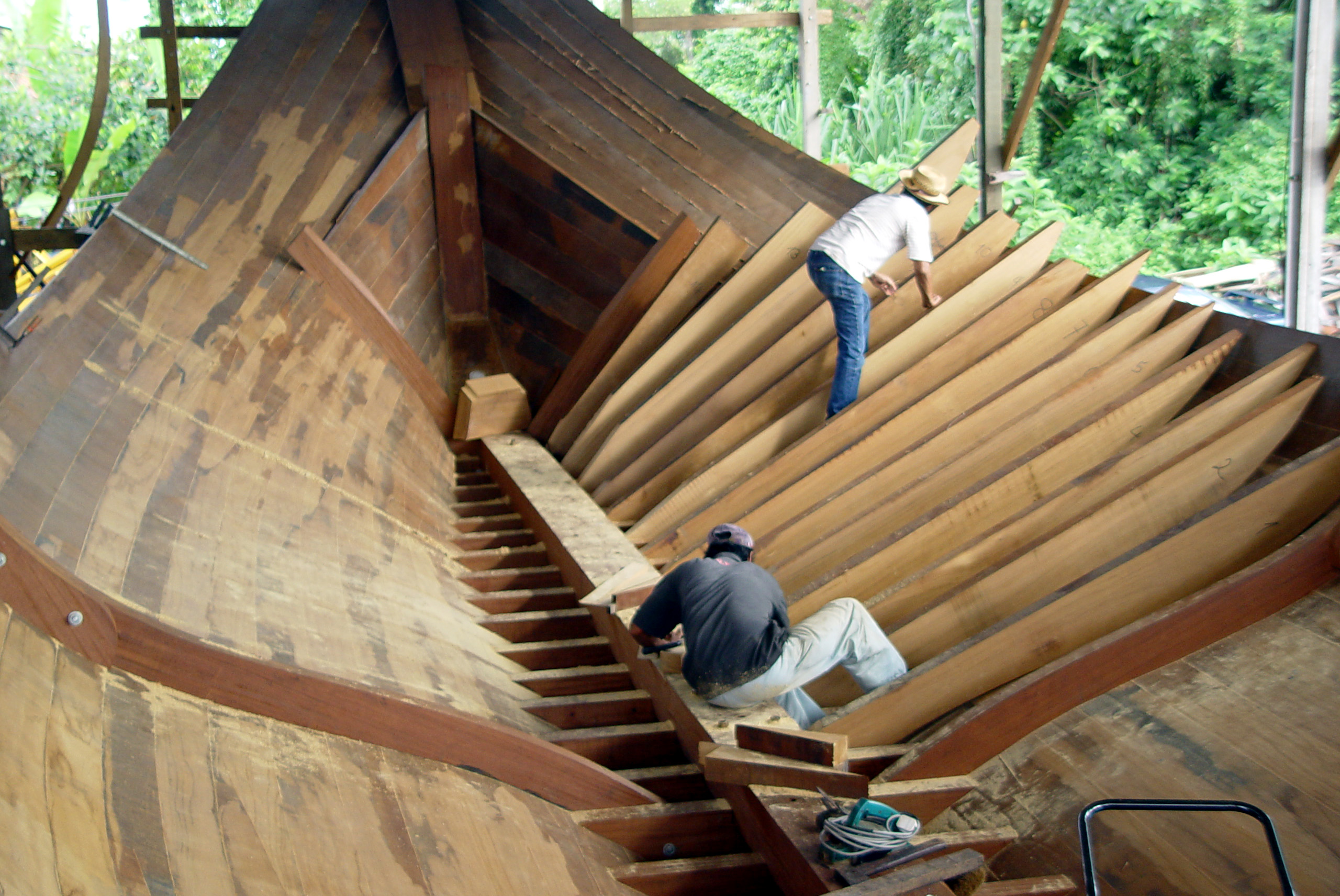
Chengal in traditional Malay boatbuilding on Duyong Island, 2004

Chengal has been used for furniture making, house and boat-building. Despite its extreme strength and hardness, chengal is highly flexible before it is fully cured, making it suitable for plank bending (boat building). It is also highly resistant to rot, fungi and mildew. In addition, chengal has a relatively low shrinkage ratio (only inferior to teak), which makes it excellent for applications where it undergoes periodic changes in moisture. Chengal, like teak, has the unusual properties of being both an excellent structural timber for framing, planking, etc., while at the same time being easily worked and finished to a high degree.

Chengal may be varnished but does not necessarily need a "finish". The wood naturally weathers to a silver-grey colour similar to teak. It can be easily planed, drilled or turned. Nailing is very difficult and the wood often has to be pre-drilled.

=== Durability ===
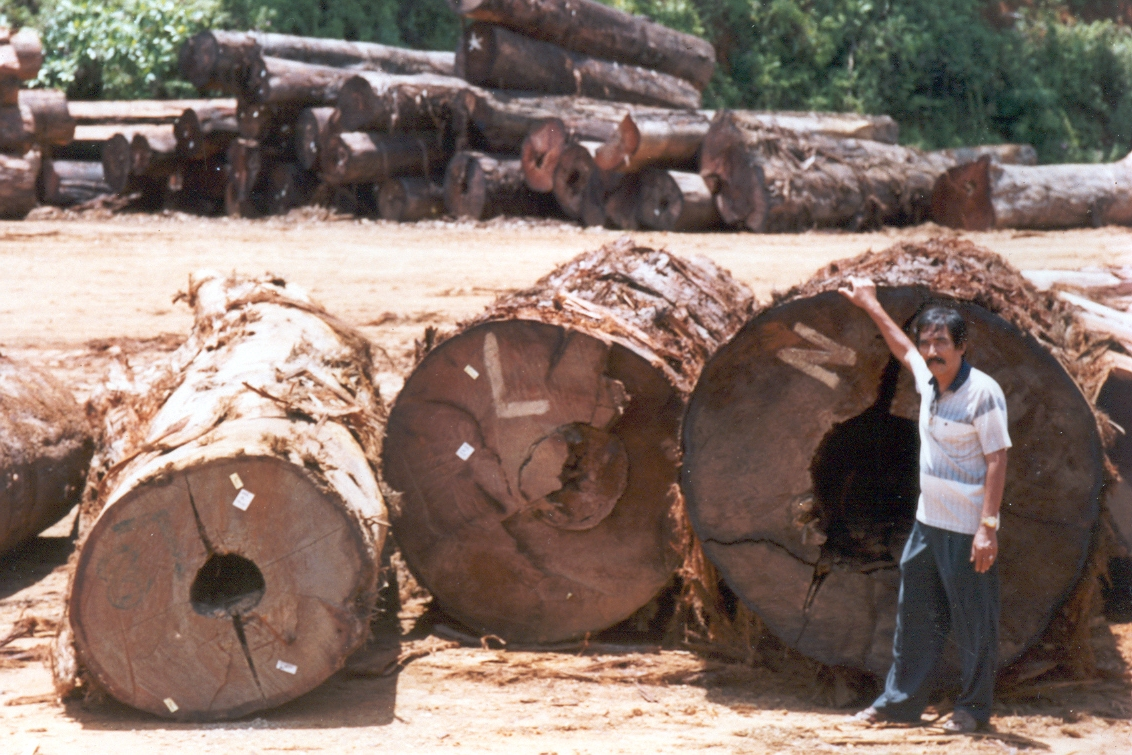
Chengal in a sawmill in Terengganu state, 2003

The timber is classified as naturally durable and is normally very resistant to termite attack and fungal infestation. Under graveyard test conditions, untreated specimens of size 50 mm × 50 mm × 600 mm lasted 9 years. Treated specimen of the same size and test conditions lasted about 19 years. Untreated railway sleepers of size 238 mm × 125 mm × 1,950 mm laid under severe environmental conditions gave an average service life of 19 years. Termites do not attack the sound timber.
