= Association for the Taxonomic Study of the Flora of Tropical Africa =

Learned society

Association pour l’Etude Taxonomique de la Flore d’Afrique Tropicale
- Formation: 1951
- Region served: Tropical Africa
- Website: https://www.aetfat.org/

The Association pour l’Etude Taxonomique de la Flore d’Afrique Tropicale (AETFAT) is a scientific association for the study of the flora of Tropical Africa. Other names for the organization are the Association for the Taxonomic Study of the Flora of Tropical Africa and Verband für die Taxonomische Untersuchung der Flora des Tropischen Afrikas. The association was planned by Edgar Milne-Redhead (Royal Botanic Gardens, Kew), Arthur Wallis Exell (British Museum), and Jean Joseph Gustave Léonard (Meise Botanic Garden) in 1949 and established at the Université libre de Bruxelles in 1951. A meeting, called a congress, is held every three years, the latest one occurring in August 2025 in Accra, Ghana.

Members of AETFAT have compiled a vegetation map of Africa.
