= Uapaca heudelotii =

Scientific classification
- Kingdom: Plantae
- Clade: Tracheophytes
- Clade: Angiosperms
- Clade: Eudicots
- Clade: Rosids
- Order: Malpighiales
- Family: Phyllanthaceae
- Genus: Uapaca
- Species: U. heudelotii

Binomial name
- Uapaca heudelotii Baill.

Evergreen plant from Africa

Uapaca heudelotii, also known as rikio des rivières, is an evergreen plant in the family Phyllanthaceae. It is found in western Tropical Africa (Senegal, the Central African Republic, Angola, and the Democratic Republic of Congo) and is always located in wet places, mostly on river borders as it stabilizes the soil.

== Description ==
Uapaca heudelotii is an evergreen, dioecious tree that usually grows to be 30 m (98 ft) but there is evidence of specimens that have grown to be 40 m (130 ft). Its leaves are arranged spirally and are simple with a pinnate venation. It’s made up of sap-wood that is light-colored, heart-wood that is a reddish-brown color, and the inner bark containing a sticky red sap. Male inflorescence where the male flowers are fixed in one place and the female flowers are pedicelled. The flowers are green and white in color. Uapaca heudelotii contains flowers that are unisexual. The male flowers contain unequal calyx lobes, are stamens free, smooth, and have a rudimentary ovary. The female flowers have superior ovaries, egg-shaped, and are smooth. The ellipsoid to obovoid fruit is 22–30 mm (0.87–1.18 in) long and 18–22 mm (0.71–0.87 in) wide.

== Cultivation and uses ==
It has many uses ranging from construction, medicine, and as a source of nutrients. The fruits are sweet and are commonly consumed by locals. The wood of the plant can be used for flooring, ship building, furniture, vehicle bodies, and interior trim. The bark of Uapaca heudelotii is used in traditional medicine, where the bark is extracted through boiling and used to treat food poisoning, ovarian disorder, toothaches, hemorrhoids, and female sterility. The pulped leaves containing palm oil are used to relieve migraines and rheumatism. The stilt roots of the tree prevent erosion on stream banks and promote the accumulation of stilt.
