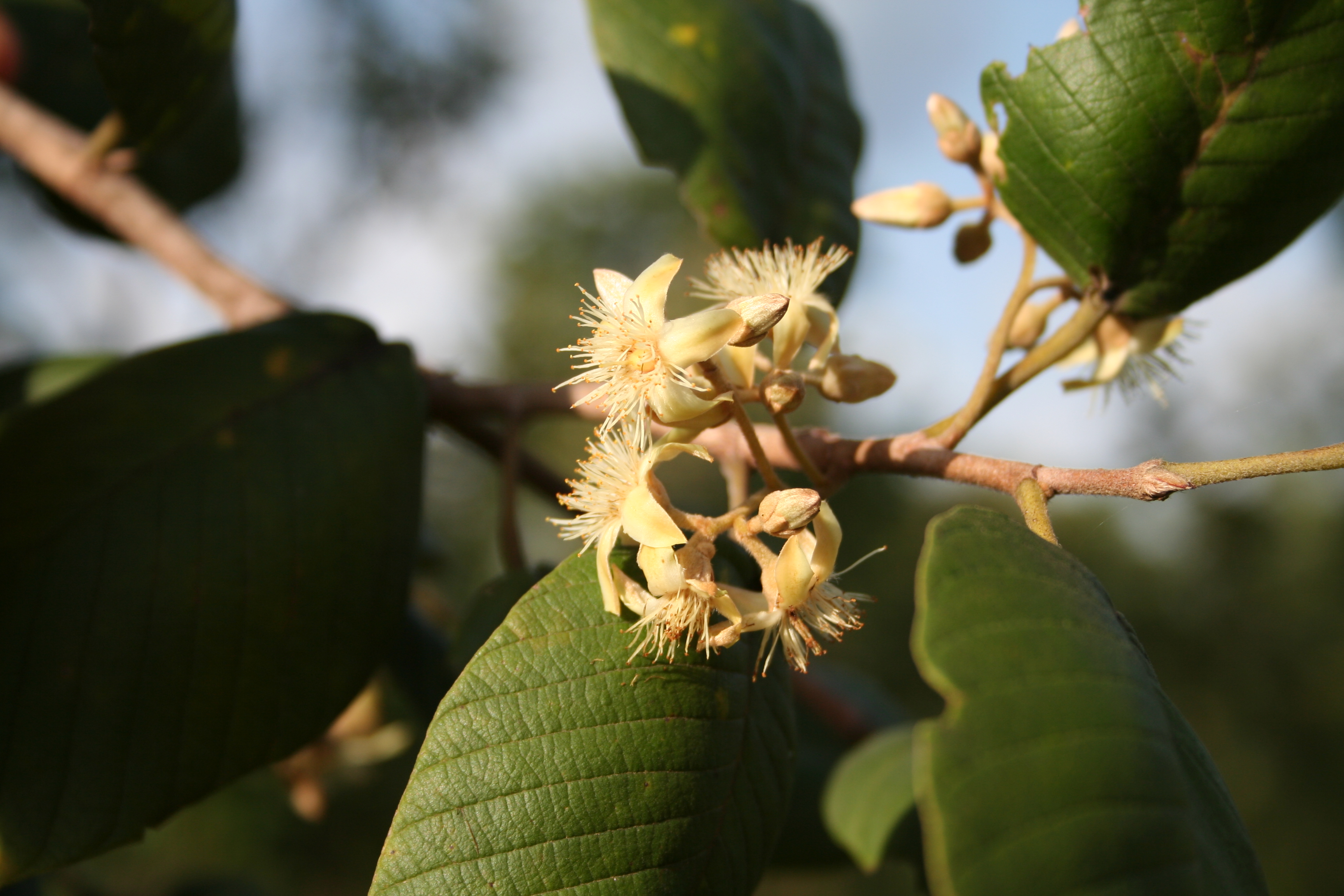
- Monotes kerstingii

Scientific classification
- Kingdom: Plantae
- Clade: Tracheophytes
- Clade: Angiosperms
- Clade: Eudicots
- Clade: Rosids
- Order: Malvales
- Family: Dipterocarpaceae
- Subfamily: Monotoideae; Gilg

Genera
- See text

= Monotoideae =

Subfamily of trees

Monotoideae is a subfamily of the plant family Dipterocarpaceae, with 3 genera and 30 species. It is native to the rainforest habitat of Africa and Madagascar, as well as South America. The geographical discontinuity can be traced back to a date prior to the separation of these land masses and the subsequent migration, evolution and preservation of the species in suitable habitats.

== Genera ==
- Marquesia is native to Africa.
- Monotes has 26 species, distributed across Africa and Madagascar.
- Pseudomonotes is native to the Colombian Amazon and Pacaraima Mountains.
