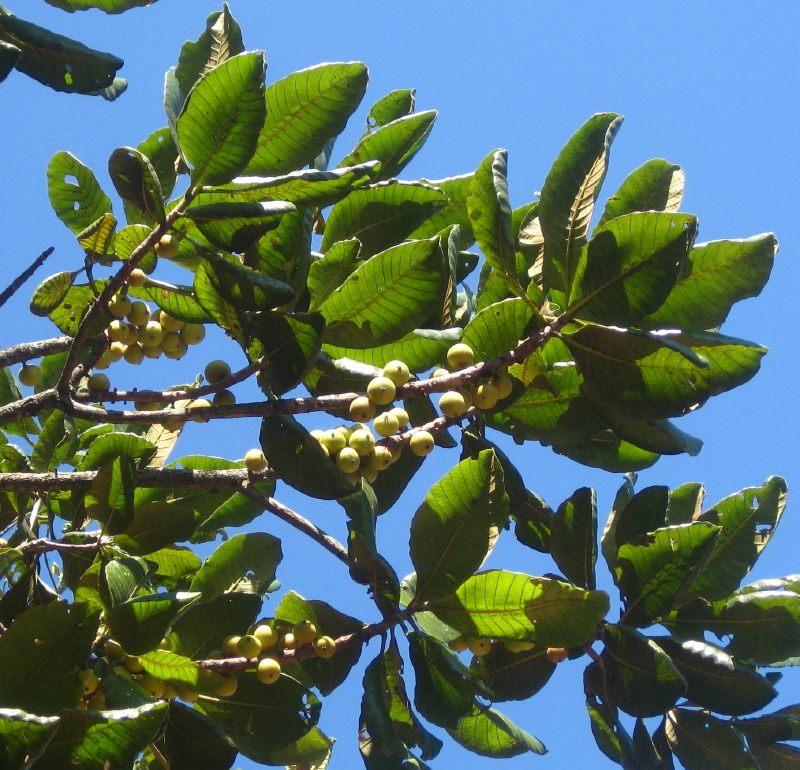

Scientific classification
- Kingdom: Plantae
- Clade: Embryophytes
- Clade: Tracheophytes
- Clade: Spermatophytes
- Clade: Angiosperms
- Clade: Eudicots
- Clade: Rosids
- Order: Malpighiales
- Family: Phyllanthaceae
- Genus: Uapaca
- Species: U. kirkiana

Binomial name
- Uapaca kirkiana Müll. Arg.
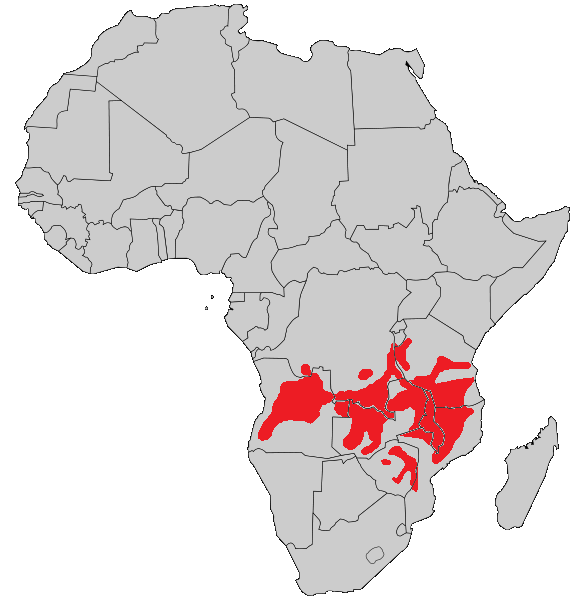
- approximate range

= Uapaca kirkiana =

Species of fruit and plant

Uapaca kirkiana, the sugar plum or mahobohobo, is a species of dioecious plant in the family Phyllanthaceae. It is native to the southern Afrotropics, where it occurs in well-watered miombo woodlands. Within range it is one of the most popular wild fruits. It is rarely cultivated but trees are left when land is being cleared. Still a traditional food plant in Africa, this little-known fruit has the potential to improve nutrition, boost food security, foster rural development and support sustainable land care.

In Shona, the fruit are referred to as mazhanje, and in Chichewa masuku.

== Range ==
It occurs in the miombo woodlands of Angola, the DRCongo, Zambia, southern Burundi, Tanzania, Malawi, central and northern Mozambique, and Zimbabwe.

== Growth ==
It is a dioecious species – the clusters of staminate (or male) and single pistillate (or female) flowers are borne on separate trees. It grows to a height of 5–13 meters, and 15–25 cm in trunk diameter. The dark green, glossy leaves are 12–36 cm long and 8–24 cm wide. It is not prone to attack by pests. It grows in areas with over 600 mm/year of rain, and prefers well drained sand or gravelly soils low in organic matter; its presence is indicative of poor agricultural soils.

== Fruit ==
Female trees fruit after about 9–10 years from seed. The fruit is roughly spherical drupe about 2–4 cm in diameter, green in colour ripening to yellow or brown. When ripe, the 1.5 mm hard shell encloses the yellow flesh which has an appealing sweet taste that has been likened to pear or plum. Fruits usually contain 3 or 4 seeds, though sometimes 5. Fruits weigh between 5 and 50 grams each, with from 0.2 to 30 grams of pulp. The fruit is usually eaten by wild animals such as monkeys.

== Propagation ==
It is usually propagated by seed, which is recalcitrant and germinates readily, reaching 90% after 6 weeks for fresh seed. The tree can also be propagated vegetatively – a success rate of 80% has been achieved with wedge or splice grafts. Air layering is also possible, though these trees have not fared well without a taproot. The tree naturally propagates via underground suckers and forms stands.

== Cultivars ==
Little work has been done developing cultivars, though some named varieties do exist. Since 1996, work on propagating of superior seedlings has been carried out in Malawi, Tanzania, Zambia, Mozambique and Zimbabwe by the Southern Africa Regional Programme.

== Name ==
The species is named in honor of Sir John Kirk, explorer and naturalist (1832 – 1922).
