= Pseudomonotes =

Conservation status
- Least Concern (IUCN 3.1)

Scientific classification
- Kingdom: Plantae
- Clade: Tracheophytes
- Clade: Angiosperms
- Clade: Eudicots
- Clade: Rosids
- Order: Malvales
- Family: Dipterocarpaceae
- Subfamily: Monotoideae
- Genus: Pseudomonotes; A.C.Londoño, E.Alvarez & Forero
- Species: P. tropenbosii

Binomial name
- Pseudomonotes tropenbosii A.C.Londoño, E.Alvarez & Forero

Genus of trees

Pseudomonotes is a monotypic genus of trees in the family Dipterocarpaceae. It contains a single species Pseudomonotes tropenbosii, which is endemic to the Amazon rainforest of southeastern Colombia.
