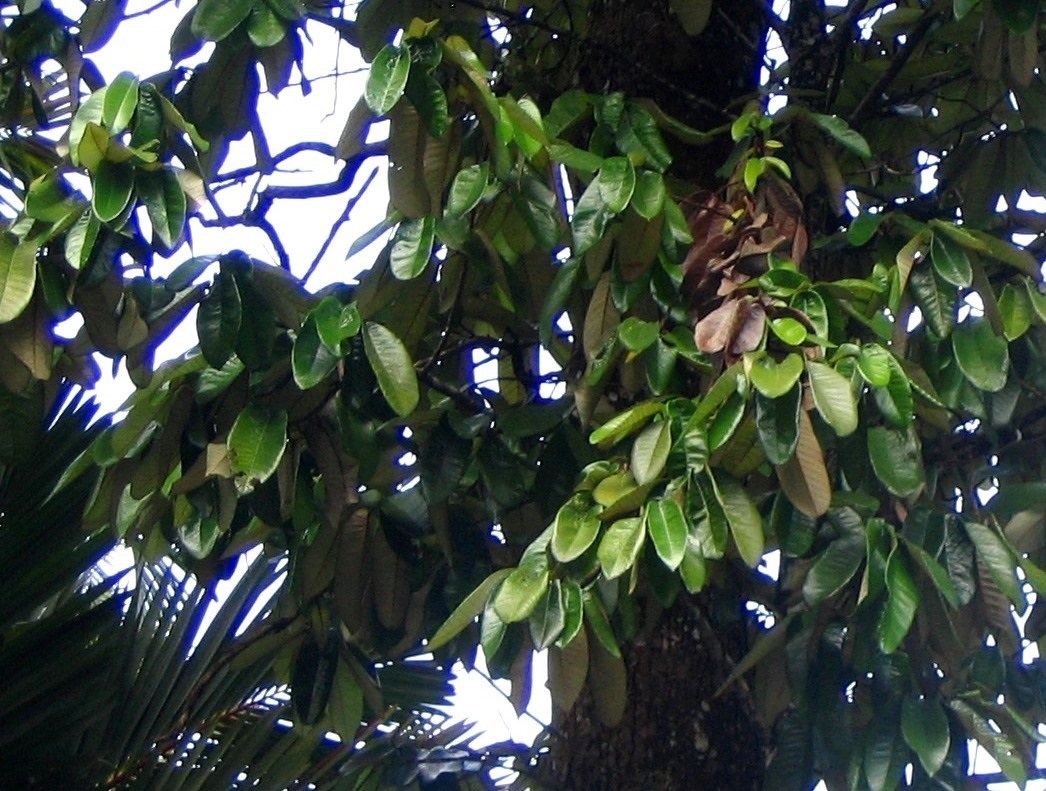

Conservation status
- Vulnerable (IUCN 3.1)

Scientific classification
- Kingdom: Plantae
- Clade: Tracheophytes
- Clade: Angiosperms
- Clade: Eudicots
- Clade: Rosids
- Order: Malvales
- Family: Dipterocarpaceae
- Subfamily: Dipterocarpoideae
- Genus: Upuna; Symington
- Species: U. borneensis

Binomial name
- Upuna borneensis Symington

= Upuna =

Genus of trees

Upuna is a monotypic genus of plants containing the single species Upuna borneensis. The genus name Upana is derived from its Iban name, upan. The species name borneensis refers to its distribution, being found only in Borneo. It is native to lowland mixed dipterocarp forests up to 400 meters elevation. It is a heavy hardwood similar to Vatica. While Upuna borneensis occurs in protected areas, it is threatened by logging, expansion of palm oil plantations and increasing frequency of fires.
