= Marquesia macroura =

Conservation status
- Least Concern (IUCN 3.1)

Scientific classification
- Kingdom: Plantae
- Clade: Tracheophytes
- Clade: Angiosperms
- Clade: Eudicots
- Clade: Rosids
- Order: Malvales
- Family: Dipterocarpaceae
- Genus: Marquesia
- Species: M. macroura

Binomial name
- Marquesia macroura Gilg

Synonyms
- Monotes sapinii De Wild.; Trillesanthus macrourus (Gilg) Sosef

Species of flowering plant

Marquesia macroura is a species of flowering plant in the family Dipterocarpaceae. It is a large tree, growing up to 30 meters tall, which is native to northern Angola, southern Democratic Republic of the Congo, Zambia, and western Tanzania. It flowers from June to October and is insect pollinated. It grows in wet miombo woodland and dry evergreen Cryptosepalum forest on loamy Kalahari sands up to 1,500 metres elevation. The species is common in its habitat and often locally dominant. The population is declining from timber overharvesting and forest clearance.

The species was first described by Ernest Friedrich Gilg in 1908.
