= Neohopea =

Conservation status
- Vulnerable (IUCN 3.1)

Scientific classification
- Kingdom: Plantae
- Clade: Embryophytes
- Clade: Tracheophytes
- Clade: Angiosperms
- Clade: Eudicots
- Clade: Rosids
- Order: Malvales
- Family: Dipterocarpaceae
- Genus: Neohopea (P.S.Ashton) P.S.Ashton (2022)
- Species: N. isoptera

Binomial name
- Neohopea isoptera (P.S.Ashton) P.S.Ashton & J.Heck. (2022)

Synonyms
- Shorea isoptera P.S.Ashton (1962)

Species of tree native to Borneo

Neohopea isoptera is a species of flowering plant in the family Dipterocarpaceae. It is the sole species in the genus Neohopea. It is a tree endemic to Borneo. It is native to lowland mixed dipterocarp forest up to 500 meters elevation, where it is a canopy tree growing up to 60 meters tall.
