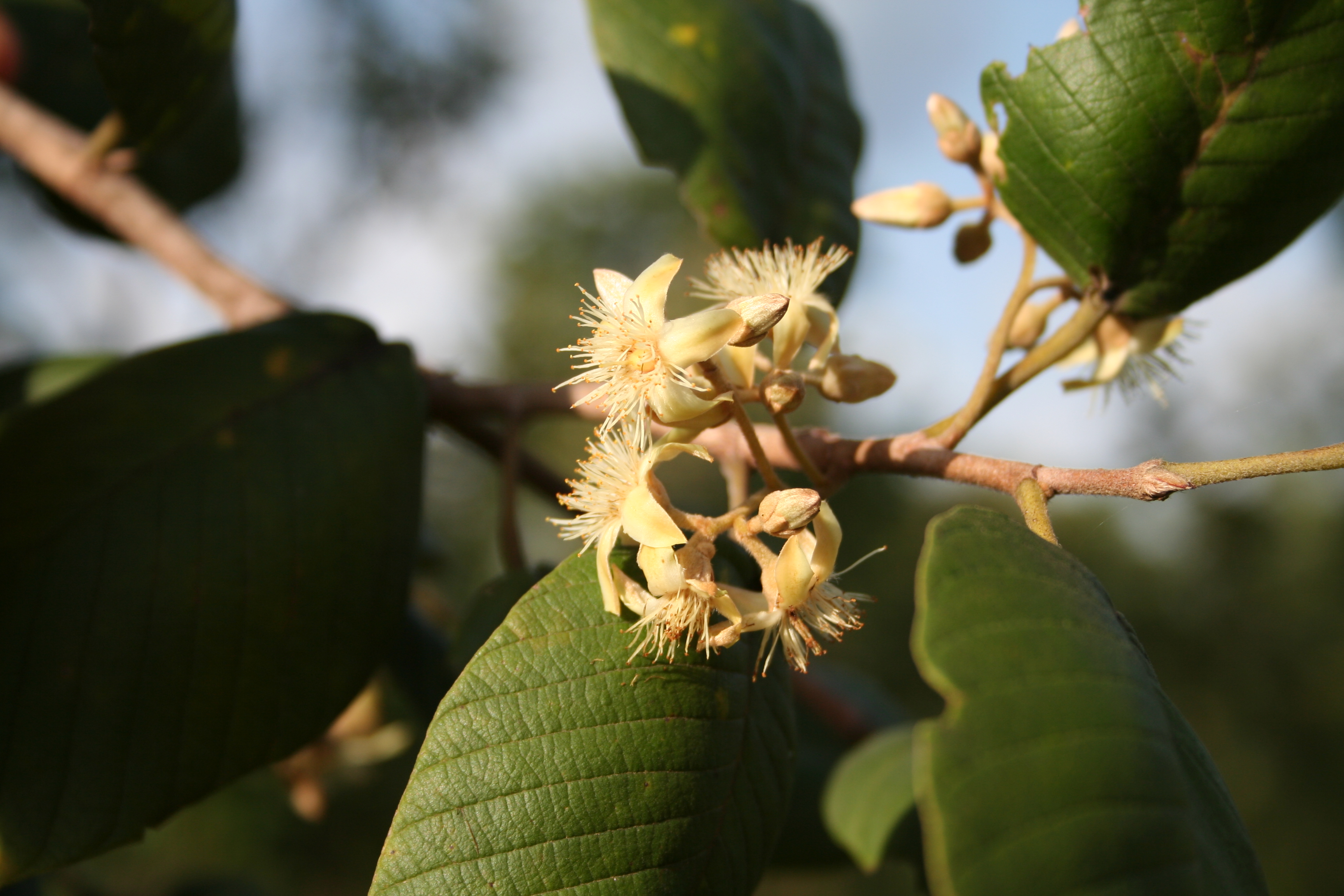
- Monotes kerstingii

Scientific classification
- Kingdom: Plantae
- Clade: Embryophytes
- Clade: Tracheophytes
- Clade: Angiosperms
- Clade: Eudicots
- Clade: Rosids
- Order: Malvales
- Family: Dipterocarpaceae
- Subfamily: Monotoideae
- Genus: Monotes; A.DC. (1868)

Type species
- Monotes africanus A.DC.

= Monotes =

Genus of trees

Monotes is a genus of flowering plants in the family Dipterocarpaceae. Its name, meaning "unity" or "uniqueness" was chosen because it was the only genus of dipterocarp then known to occur in Africa. The Zambezian region is the centre of diversity for the genus.

== Species ==
23 species are accepted.

- Monotes adenophyllus Gilg
- Monotes africanus A.DC.
- Monotes autennei P.A.Duvign.
- Monotes dasyanthus Gilg
- Monotes doryphorus P.A.Duvign.
- Monotes duvigneaudii Meerts
- Monotes engleri Gilg
- Monotes glaber Sprague
- Monotes glandulosus Pierre
- Monotes gossweileri De Wild.
- Monotes hirtii P.A.Duvign.
- Monotes hypoleucus (Welw.) Gilg
- Monotes katangensis (De Wild.) De Wild.
- Monotes kerstingii Gilg
- Monotes lutambensis Verdc.
- Monotes madagascariensis Humbert
- Monotes magnificus Gilg
- Monotes paivae Catarino & E.S.Martins
- Monotes pearsonii H.H.Bancr.
- Monotes redheadii P.A.Duvign.
- Monotes rubriglans H.H.Bancr.
- Monotes rufotomentosus Gilg
- Monotes xasenguensis H.H.Bancr.
