= Edgar Milne-Redhead =

British botanist

Edgar Wolston Bertram Handsley Milne-Redhead MBE (1906-1996) was a British botanist. He was born in Frome, Somerset, UK. Educated at Cheltenham College and Gonville and Caius College, Cambridge, he began work at the Royal Botanic Gardens, Kew in 1928. In 1930, he accepted an offer to work in the Colonial Office in Northern Rhodesia (now Zambia), where he collected plants for herbarium specimens. He was based at Matonchi Farm, west of Mwinilunga, North-Western Province, Zambia, near the borders of Angola and the Democratic Republic of the Congo for 4½ months. He also collected extensively near Kalene Hill. He discovered many new species, and several were named after him, including Amphiasma redheadii Bremek., Commelina milne-redheadii Faden, Digitaria redheadii (C.E.Hubb.) Clayton, Monotes redheadii P.A.Duvign., and Pavetta redheadii Bremek.. In 1933, he married artist and illustrator Olive Shaw, with whom he had one daughter.

In 1949, he and others began the process to establish an “Association pour l’Etude Taxonomique de la Flore d’Afrique Tropicale” (or “Association for the Taxonomic Study of the Flora of Tropical Africa”) (AETFAT). He prepared treatments for the Flora of Tropical East Africa and eventually published 161 new names. Returning to the UK, he was appointed Deputy Keeper of the Herbarium and Library at the Royal Botanic Gardens, Kew, and editor of Kew Bulletin, serving from 1959 until 1971. He became president of the Botanical Society of the British Isles, now the Botanical Society of Britain and Ireland, in 1969. His last campaign at Kew was an effort to set up a Conservation Unit, which occurred in 1972.

He was appointed an MBE in the 1996 Birthday Honours and died later that year in Colchester.
