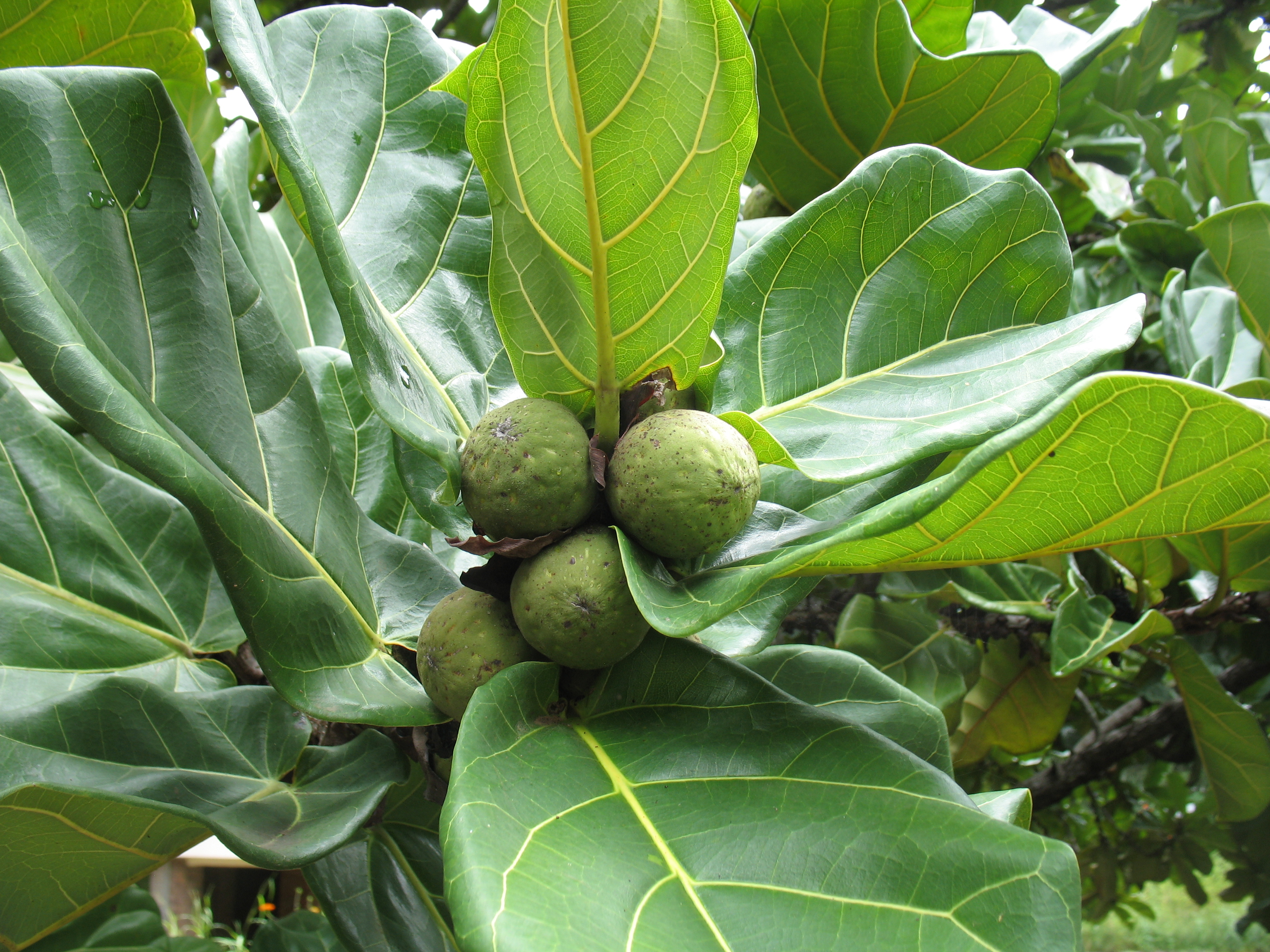
- Uapaca kirkiana

Scientific classification
- Kingdom: Plantae
- Clade: Tracheophytes
- Clade: Angiosperms
- Clade: Eudicots
- Clade: Rosids
- Order: Malpighiales
- Family: Phyllanthaceae
- Subfamily: Antidesmatoideae
- Tribe: Uapaceae
- Genus: Uapaca; Baill.

Type species
- Uapaca thouarsii Baill.

Synonyms
- Canariastrum Engl.; Gymnocarpus Thouars ex Baill.; Aapaca Metzdorff

= Uapaca =

Genus of flowering plants

Uapaca is a genus of plant, in the family Phyllanthaceae first described as a genus in 1858. It is the only genus comprised in the tribe Uapaceae. The genus is native to Africa and Madagascar. Uapaca is dioecious, with male and female flowers on separate plants.

species

1. Uapaca acuminata – Nigeria, C Africa
2. Uapaca ambanjensis – NW Madagascar
3. Uapaca amplifolia – NW Madagascar
4. Uapaca bojeri – Madagascar
5. Uapaca densifolia – Madagascar
6. Uapaca ferruginea – Madagascar
7. Uapaca guineensis – W + C Africa
8. Uapaca heudelotii – W + C Africa
9. Uapaca kirkiana – E + C + S Africa
10. Uapaca lissopyrena – C + S Africa
11. Uapaca littoralis – E Madagascar
12. Uapaca louvelii – E Madagascar
13. Uapaca mole – W + C Africa
14. Uapaca niangadoumae – Gabon
15. Uapaca nitida – E + C + S Africa
16. Uapaca pilosa – E + C Africa
17. Uapaca pynaertii – W + C Africa
18. Uapaca robynsii – Katanga, Zambia, Malawi
19. Uapaca rufopilosa – Democratic Republic of the Congo, Angola, Zambia
20. Uapaca sansibarica – E + C + S Africa
21. Uapaca staudtii – Nigeria, C Africa
22. Uapaca teusczii – Democratic Republic of the Congo, Angola, Zambia
23. Uapaca thouarsii – E Madagascar
24. Uapaca togoensis – W + C Africa
25. Uapaca vanhouttei – Nigeria, C Africa

formerly included

- Uapaca benguelensis – Uapaca kirkiana var. benguelensis
- Uapaca esculenta – Uapaca pynaertii
- Uapaca gossweileri – Uapaca kirkiana var. gossweileri
- Uapaca griffithii – Drypetes riseleyi
- Uapaca katentaniensis – Uapaca teusczii f. pilosa
