= Nellie Bancroft =

British botanist (1887–1950)

Nellie Bancroft FRS FLS
- Born: Helen Holme Bancroft; 30 September 1887; Derby, England
- Died: 2 October 1950 (aged 63)
- Education: University of Cambridge
- Spouse: Charles Eyres Simmons
- Scientific career
- Fields: Botany, palaeobotany
- Workplaces: Bedford College; Westfield College; University of Oxford
- Author abbrev. (botany): H.H.Bancr.

Helen Holme Simmons FRS FLS (née Bancroft; 30 September 1887 – 2 October 1950), commonly known as Nellie Bancroft, was a British botanist and scientific illustrator famous for her work on plant systematics and the anatomy of both living and fossil plants. Bancroft was while working for the Imperial Forestry Institute in France in 1940 captured by the Germans and spent four years in internment before being released and returning home in 1944.

== Biography ==
Helen Holme Bancroft was born in Derby, England on 30 September 1887. She studied at the Derby Girl's Secondary School, and then pursued higher education at the University College Nottingham and then the University College London, earning a Bachelor of Science degree c. 1910. Bancroft was then trained at Newnham College as a research student from 1911 to 1914 and earned a Doctor of Science degree at the University of Cambridge in 1915.

She held a variety of professional positions; she worked as a Demonstrator in botany in 1916 at Bedford College in London, as the acting head of the botany department at Westfield College in London from 1916 to 1918, as Demonstrator in rural economy at the University of Oxford from 1918 to 1927, and then as University Demonstrator at Oxford from 1927 to 1932. From 1932 onwards, Bancroft worked for the Imperial Forestry Institute.

Bancroft also frequently contributed to agricultural and botanical journals. She used the author abbreviation H.H.Bancr., the simpler Bancr. already having been used by Edward Nathaniel Bancroft (1772–1842). Among her work was notable papers on the anatomy of fossil plants from India and the systematics of extant cycads. She named numerous new species and genera of plants, such as the Triassic genus Rhexoxylon and several species of Monotes. Bancroft also helped illustrate the works of others, for instance illustrating Sir William Somerville's How a Tree Grows (1927). When she was not working, Bancroft enjoyed reading, traveling and photography.

Bancroft married Charles Eyres Simmons on 20 March 1939. Though she took his last name, becoming Helen Holme Simmons, she continued to be known as Helen Bancroft professionally.

In 1940, Bancroft travelled to France as a research worker. While conducting research in France, she was based in Barneville-Carteret in Normandy. Bancroft was captured by the Germans in 1940 and placed in an internment camp. By April 1942 she was interned alongside her husband at the Grand Hotel in Vittel, France. In that month, an announcement was published in Nature prompting Bancroft's scientific friends to send her letters "during her isolation from scientific life".

Bancroft was freed from internment in 1944. She lived for only six further years after regaining her freedom, dying on 2 October 1950.

== Honours and memberships ==
- Linnean Society, Fellow (1910)
- Royal Society, Fellow (1936)
- General Committee of the British Association for the Advancement of Science, member (1933)
- International Association of Wood Anatomists, member

The Late Jurassic conifer Bancroftiastrobus, described in 2013, was named in Bancroft's honour.

The standard author abbreviation H.H.Bancr. is used to indicate this person as the author when citing a botanical name.
