= Ernest Friedrich Gilg =

German botanist

Ernest (or Ernst) Friedrich Gilg (12 January 1867 in Baden-Württemberg, Germany – 11 October 1933 in Berlin) was a German botanist.

== Life ==
Gilg was curator of the Botanical Museum in Berlin. With fellow botanist Adolf Engler, he co-authored and published a syllabus on botanical families, Syllabus der Pflanzenfamilien (8th edition 1919). He also made contributions to Engler's "Das Pflanzenreich", (e.g. the section on the family Monimiaceae). The Poaceae grass genus, Gilgiochloa, was posthumously named after him. His spouse, Charlotte Gilg-Benedict (1872–1936), was co-author in some of his publications, and has the author abbreviation Gilg-Ben.

== Work ==
- Pharmazeutische Warenkunde, published 1911
- Grundzüge der Botanik für Pharmazeuten, published 1921
- Lehrbuch der Pharmakognosie, Digital edition published 1905; 2nd edition published 1910; 3rd edition published 1922

Over the course of his life, Gilg was binomial author or co-author of many species of plants. He named 42 species, subspecies, and sub-families of various grasses.
