= Miombo =

Central African biome

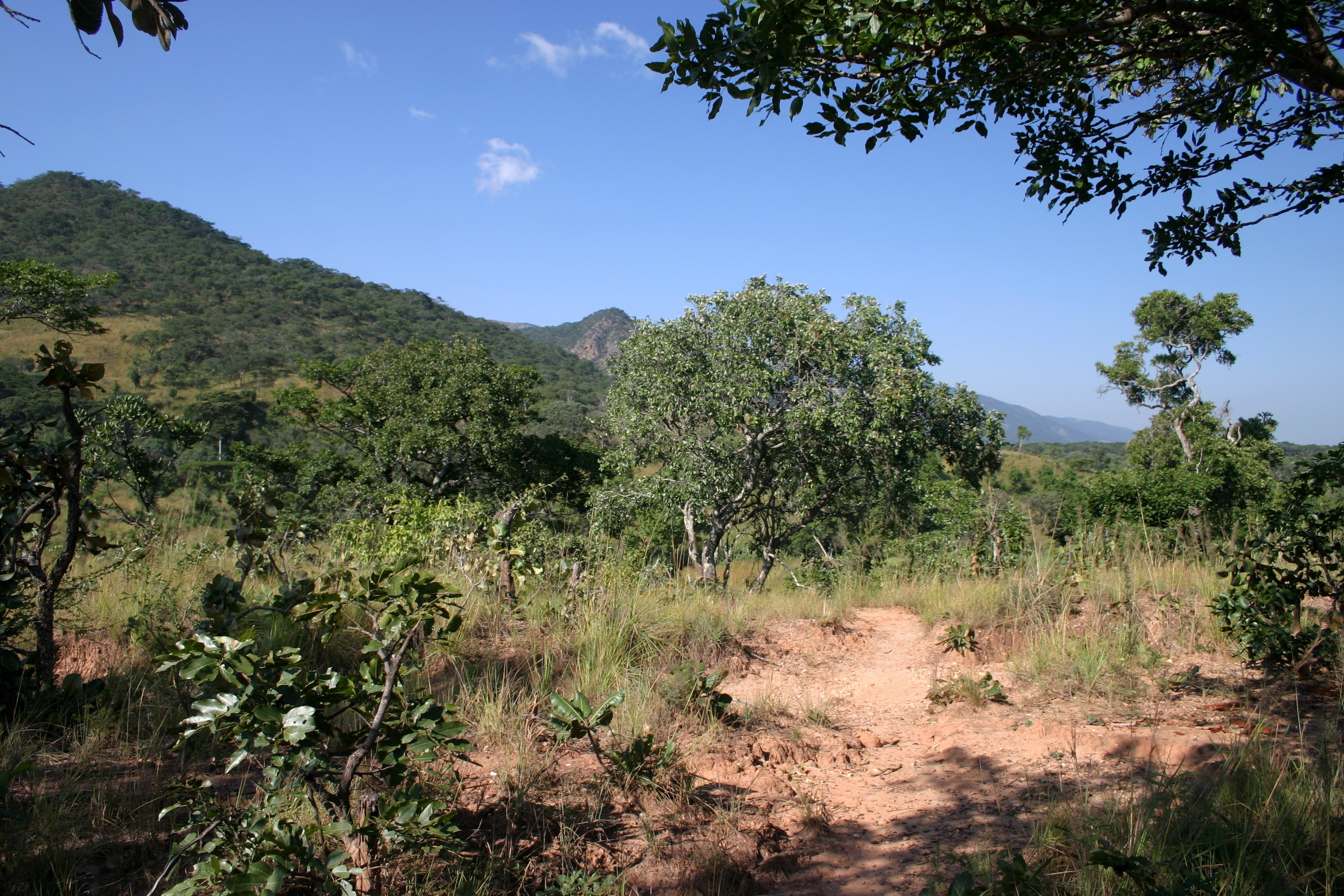
Miombo forest on the Nyika Plateau, Malawi

Miombo woodland is a tropical and subtropical grasslands, savannas, and shrublands biome (in the World Wide Fund for Nature scheme) located in central and southern tropical Africa. It includes three woodland savanna ecoregions characterized by the dominant presence of Brachystegia, Julbernardia and Isoberlinia genera of trees and has a range of climates ranging from humid to semi-arid, and tropical to subtropical or even temperate. The trees characteristically shed their leaves for a short period in the dry season to reduce water loss and produce a flush of new leaves just before the onset of the wet season with rich gold and red colours masking the underlying chlorophyll, reminiscent of autumn colours in the temperate zone.

== Description ==
Miombo woodlands extend across south-central Africa, running from Angola in the west to Tanzania in the east, including parts of Democratic Republic of the Congo, Malawi, Mozambique, Zambia, and Zimbabwe. They are bounded on the north by the humid Congolian rainforests, on the northeast by Acacia–Commiphora bushland, and on the south by semi-arid woodlands, grasslands, and savannas.

The woodland gets its name from miombo (plural, singular muombo), the Bemba word for Brachystegia species. Other Bantu languages of the region, such as Swahili and Shona, have related if not identical words, such as Swahili miyombo (singular myombo). These woodlands are dominated by trees of subfamily Detarioideae, particularly miombo (Brachystegia), Julbernardia and Isoberlinia, which are rarely found outside miombo woodlands.

Miombo woodlands can be classified as dry or wet based on the per annum amount and distribution of rainfall. Dry woodlands occur in those areas receiving less than 1000 mm annual rainfall, mostly in Zimbabwe, central Tanzania, eastern and southern Mozambique, Malawi, and southern Zambia. Wet woodlands are those receiving more than 1000 mm annual rainfall, mainly located in northern Zambia, eastern Angola, central Malawi, and western Tanzania. Wet miombo generally has a taller canopy (15 metres or more), more tree cover (60% or more ground cover), and greater species diversity than dry miombo.

== Ecoregions ==
Three ecoregions are currently recognized.

- Angolan wet miombo woodlands – Angola
- Central Zambezian wet miombo woodlands – Angola, Burundi, Democratic Republic of the Congo, Malawi, Tanzania, and Zambia
- Dry miombo woodlands – southeastern Angola, Malawi, Mozambique, central and southern Tanzania, Zambia and Zimbabwe. The dry miombo woodlands ecoregion includes the Eastern miombo woodlands and Southern miombo woodlands ecoregions previously delineated by the World Wide Fund for Nature.

== Flora and fauna ==
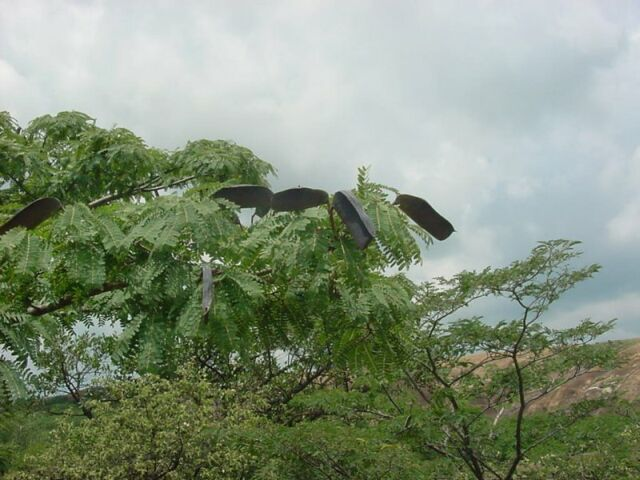
Foliage and pods of the mountain mfuti, Brachystegia glaucescens

Despite the relatively nutrient-poor soil, long dry season, and low rainfall in some areas, the woodland is home to many species, including several endemic bird species. The predominant tree is miombo (Brachystegia spp.). It provides food and cover for mammals such as the African elephant (Loxodonta africana), African wild dog (Lycaon pictus), sable antelope (Hippotragus niger) and Lichtenstein's hartebeest (Sigmoceros lichtensteinii).

== People ==
The miombo woodlands are important to the livelihoods of many rural people who depend on the resources available from the woodland. The wide variety of species provides non-timber products such as fruits, honey, mushrooms, fodder for livestock and fuelwood to various different largely Bantu peoples such as the Bemba people, Lozi people, Yao people, Luvale people, Shona people, and Luba people.
