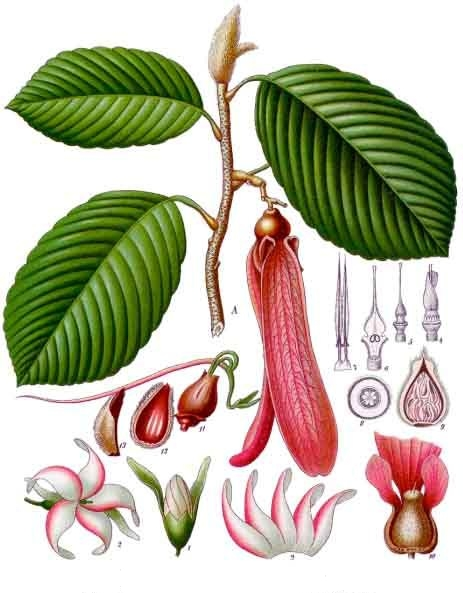
- Dipterocarpus retusus

Scientific classification
- Kingdom: Plantae
- Clade: Tracheophytes
- Clade: Angiosperms
- Clade: Eudicots
- Clade: Rosids
- Order: Malvales
- Family: Dipterocarpaceae; Blume

Genera
- Anisoptera Korth; Anthoshorea Pierre; Cotylelobium Pierre; Dipterocarpus C.F.Gaertn.; Doona Thwaites; Dryobalanops C.F.Gaertn.; Hopea Roxb.; Marquesia Gilg; Monotes A.DC.; Neobalanocarpus P.S.Ashton; Neohopea (P.S.Ashton) P.S.Ashton; Parashorea Kurz; Pentacme A.DC.; Pseudomonotes A.C.Londoño, E.Alvarez & Forero; Richetia F.Heim; Rubroshorea (Meijer) P.S.Ashton & J.Heck.; Shorea Roxb. ex C.F.Gaertn.; Stemonoporus Thwaites; Upuna Symington; Vateria L.; Vateriopsis F.Heim; Vatica L.

= Dipterocarpaceae =

Dipterocarpaceae Temporal range: Maastrichtian - recent

Family of flowering plants

Dipterocarpaceae is a family of flowering plants with 22 genera and about 695 known species of mainly lowland tropical forest trees. Their distribution is pantropical, from northern South America to Africa, the Seychelles, India, Indochina, Indonesia, Malaysia and Philippines. The greatest diversity of Dipterocarpaceae occurs in Borneo.

The largest genera are Shorea (196 species), Hopea (104 species), Dipterocarpus (70 species), and Vatica (65 species). Many are large forest-emergent species, typically reaching heights of 40–70 m, some even over 80 m (in the genera Dryobalanops, Hopea and Shorea), with the tallest known living specimen (Shorea faguetiana) 93.0 m tall. Named Menara, 'tower' in Malay, this specimen is a yellow meranti tree. It grows in the Danum Valley in Sabah.

The species of this family are of major importance in the timber trade. Some species are now endangered as a result of overcutting, extensive illegal logging, and habitat conversion. They provide valuable woods, aromatic essential oils, balsam, and resins, and are a source for plywood.

== Taxonomy ==
The family name comes from the type genus Dipterocarpus, which is derived from Greek words δι di "two", πτερόν pteron "wing", and καρπός karpós "fruit". The words combined refer to the two-winged fruit available from trees of that genus; other related genera with winged fruits of more than two are included in the family as well.

== Classification ==
The dipterocarp family is generally divided into two subfamilies:

Phylogeny of the Dipterocarpaceae

- Dipterocarpaceae
  - Dipterocarpoideae
    - Dipterocarpeae
      - Anisoptera
      - Cotylelobium
      - Dipterocarpus
      - Stemonoporus
      - Upuna
      - Vateria
      - Vateriopsis
      - Vatica
    - Shoreae
      - Anthoshorea
      - Doona
      - Dryobalanops
      - Hopea
      - Neobalanocarpus
      - Neohopea
      - Parashorea
      - Pentacme
      - Richetia
      - Rubroshorea
      - Shorea
  - Monotoideae
    - - Marquesia
      - Monotes
      - Pseudomonotes

- Dipterocarpoideae: the largest of the subfamilies, it contains 13 genera and about 475 species. Distribution includes the Seychelles, Sri Lanka, India, Southeast Asia to New Guinea, and a large distribution in Borneo, where they form the dominant species in the lowland forests. North Borneo (Brunei, Sabah, and Sarawak) is the richest area in the world for dipterocarp species. The Dipterocarpoideae can be divided morphologically into two groups, and the tribe names Shoreae and Dipterocarpeae are sometimes used, but genetic evidence so far does not support this division:
  - Valvate - Dipterocarpeae group (Anisoptera, Cotylelobium, Dipterocarpus, Stemonoporus, Upuna, Vateria, Vateriopsis, Vatica). The genera of this group have valvate sepals in fruit, solitary vessels, scattered resin canals, and basic chromosome number x = 11.
  - Imbricate - Shoreae group (Anthoshorea, Doona, Dryobalanops, Hopea, Neobalanocarpus, Neohopea, Parashorea, Pentacme, Richetia, Rubroshorea, and Shorea). The genera of this group have imbricate sepals in fruit, grouped vessels, resin canals in tangential bands, and basic chromosome number x = 7. The genera in the tribe have been substantially reorganized based on recent molecular data.
- Monotoideae: three genera, 30 species. Marquesia is native to Africa. Monotes has 26 species, distributed across Africa and Madagascar. Pseudomonotes is native to the Colombian Amazon.

A recent genetic study found that the Asian dipterocarps share a common ancestor with the Sarcolaenaceae, a tree family endemic to Madagascar. This suggests that ancestor of the dipterocarps originated in the southern supercontinent of Gondwana, and that the common ancestor of the Asian dipterocarps and the Sarcolaenaceae was found in the India-Madagascar-Seychelles land mass millions of years ago, and were carried northward by India, which later collided with Asia and allowed the dipterocarps to spread across Southeast Asia and Malaysia. Although associated with Southeast Asia in contemporary times, recent studies using fossil pollen and molecular data suggest an African origin in the mid-cretaceous. Prior to this research, the first dipterocarp pollen was found in Myanmar (which at that time was part of the Indian Plate) and it dates from the upper Oligocene. The sample appears to slowly increase in terms of diversity and abundance across the region into the mid-Miocene. Chemical traces of dipterocarp resins have been found dating back to the Eocene of India. The oldest fossils of the family are from the latest Cretaceous (Maastrichtian) aged Intertrappean Beds of India, assignable to the extant genus Dipterocarpus.

Subfamily Pakaraimoideae containing the sole genus Pakaraimaea, formerly placed here and native to the Guaianan highlands of South America, is now found to be more closely related the Cistaceae and is placed there in the APG IV (2016).

== Fossilized arthropods ==
Some 52-million-year-old amber found in the Gujarat province, India, containing a large amount of fossilized arthropods, was identified as sap from the family Dipterocarpaceae.

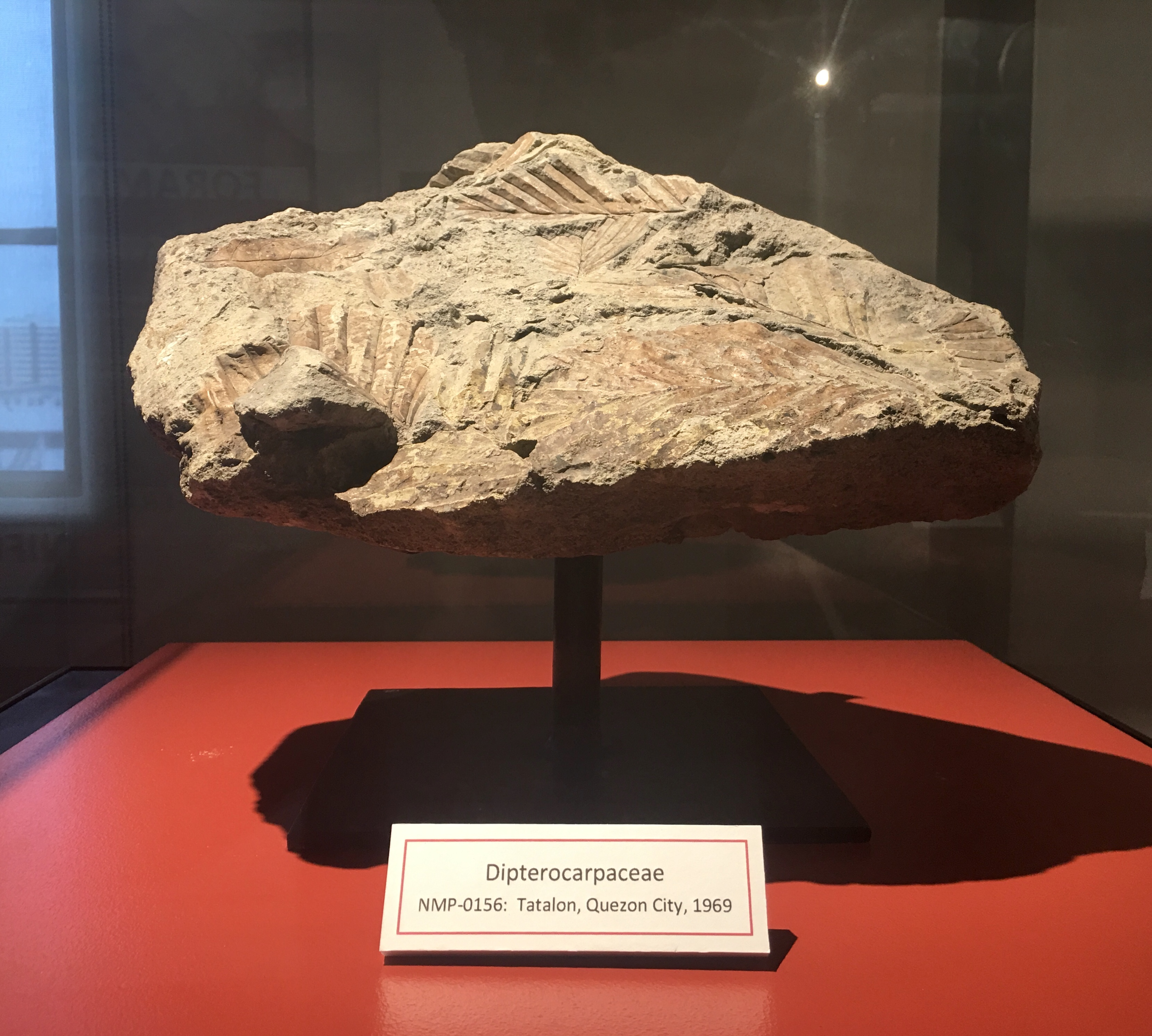
Dipterocarpaceae fossil displayed at Philippine National Museum

== Ecology ==
Dipterocarpaceae species can be either evergreen or deciduous. Species occurring in Thailand grow from sea level to about 1300 m elevation. Environments in which the species of the family occur in Thailand include lowland dipterocarp forest 0–350 m, riparian fringe, limestone hills, and coastal hills.

The dipterocarps have dominated the Borneo lowland rain forests for millions of years.

== Conservation and climate change ==
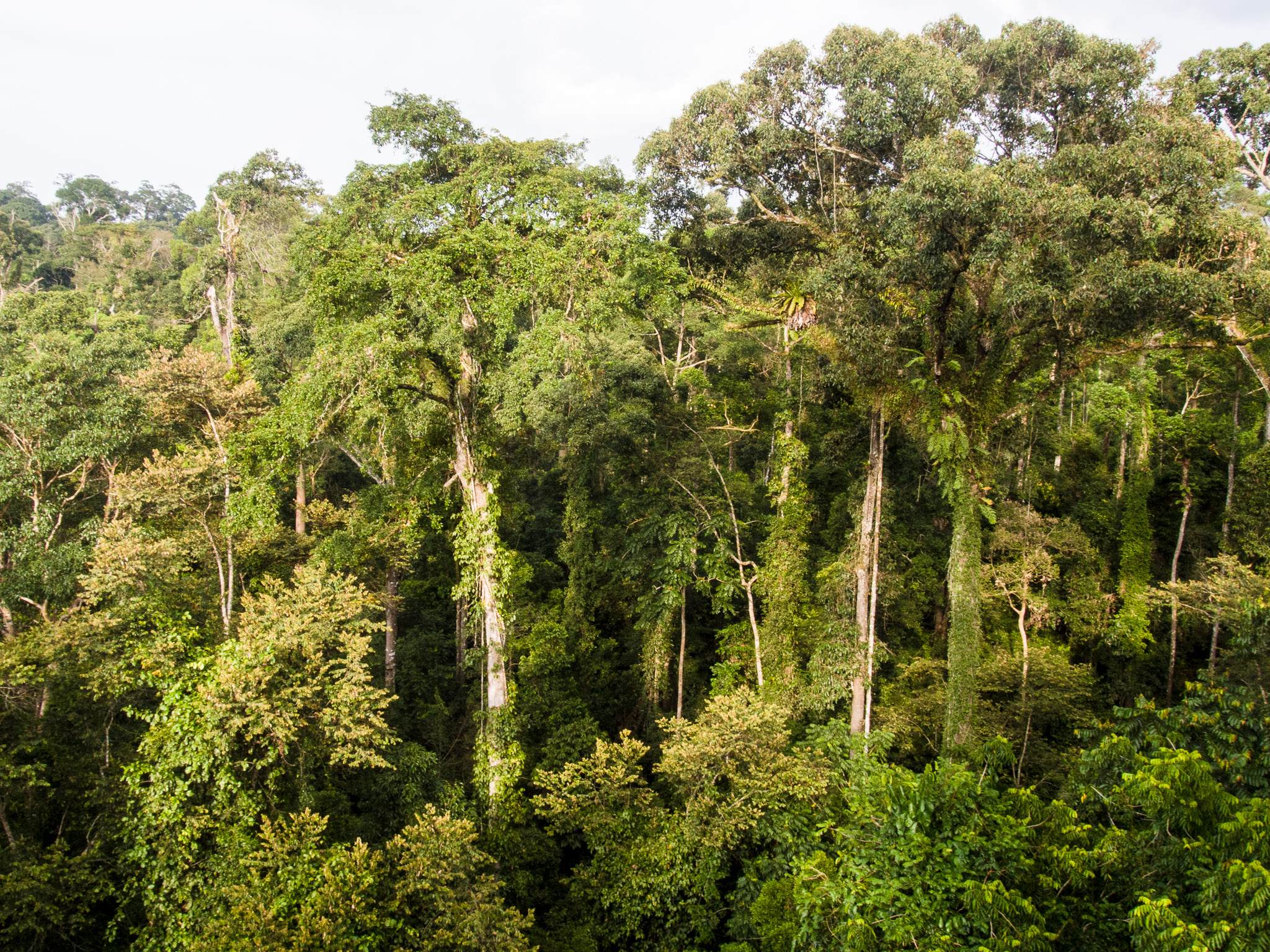
Primary lowland dipterocarp forest at Danum Valley, Sabah, Malaysia

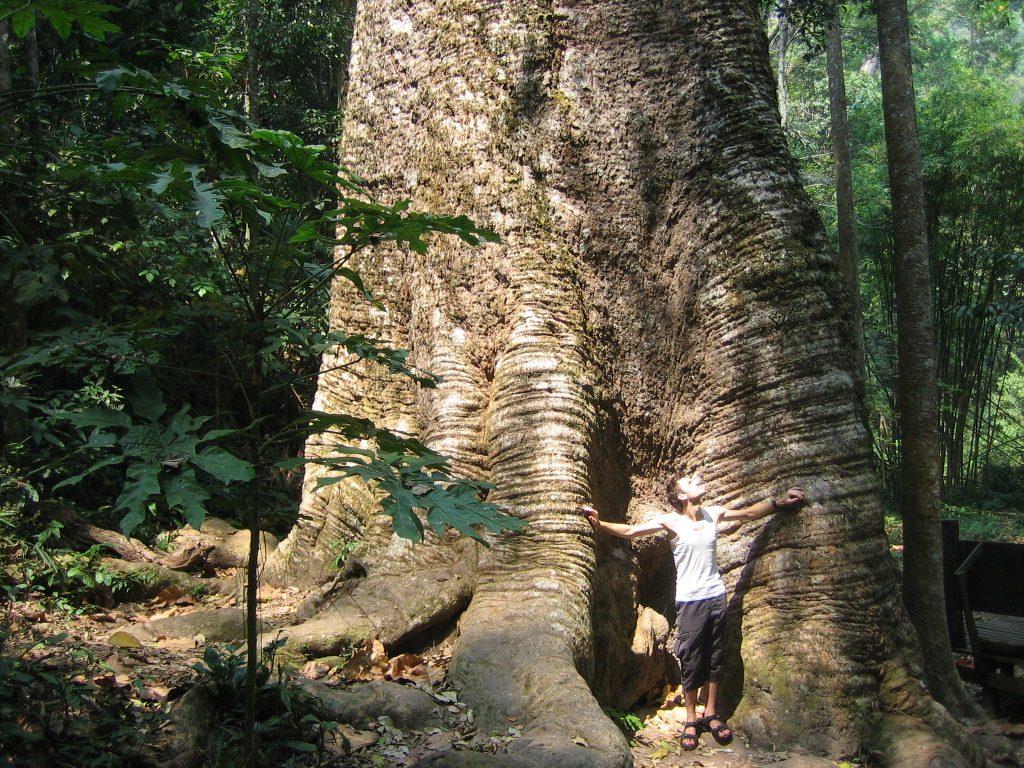
Anisoptera costata at Taksin Maharat National Park, Thailand

As the dominant tree in Southeast Asia, the Dipterocarp family has seen extensive study relating to its conservation status. They are a keystone species of the native forests of this region, and are essential to their function and structure.

One study by Pang et al. examined the impacts of climate change and land cover on the distribution of this important tree family in the Philippines. They used species distribution models (SDMs) for 19 species that were projected onto both current and future climate scenarios, with current land cover incorporated as well. They found that the current land cover alone reduced the species distributions by 67%, and 37% in protected areas. On the other hand, climate change reduced species distributions by 16-27% in both protected and unprotected areas. There was also an upward shift in elevation of species distribution as a result of climate change, as habitats changed. They concluded that there was a need to improve protected area planning as refuges for critical species, with SDMs proving to be a useful tool for providing projections that can then be incorporated into this planning process.

Another paper by Shishir et al. also investigated the potential effects of climate change on a threatened Dipterocarp tree in Purbachal, Bangladesh. Using a model that incorporated nine different environmental variables such as climate, geography, and soil conditions, they looked at two climate scenarios. They found that precipitation and soil nitrogen were the largest determinants of distribution, and that suitable habitat for this species will decline by 21-28% relative to the present land area as a result of climate change.

In Borneo, nearly all species of the Dipterocarp family are imperiled.

== See also ==
- Dipterocarp timber classification
