= List of rivers of Namibia =

This is a list of streams and rivers in Namibia, arranged geographically by drainage basin.

== Flowing into the Atlantic Ocean ==
- Hoanib River
  - Aap River
  - Ganamub River
  - Mudorib River
  - Ombonde River
    - Honib River
    - Otjovasandu River
  - Otjitaimo River
  - Tsuchub River
- Hoarusib River
- Huab River
  - Aba Huab River
  - Klein Omaruru River
  - Klip River
  - Ongwati River
    - Kakatswa River
  - Sout River
- Khumib River
- Koigab River
  - Gui-Tsawisib River
  - Springbok River
- Kuiseb River
  - Chausib River
  - Gaub River
    - Ubib River
  - Goagos River
  - Gomab River
  - Koam River
  - Nausgomab River
  - Ojab River
- Kunene River
- Messum River
- Omaruru River
  - Goab River
  - Leeu River
  - Okandjou River
  - Otjimakuru River
  - Spitzkop River
- Orange River
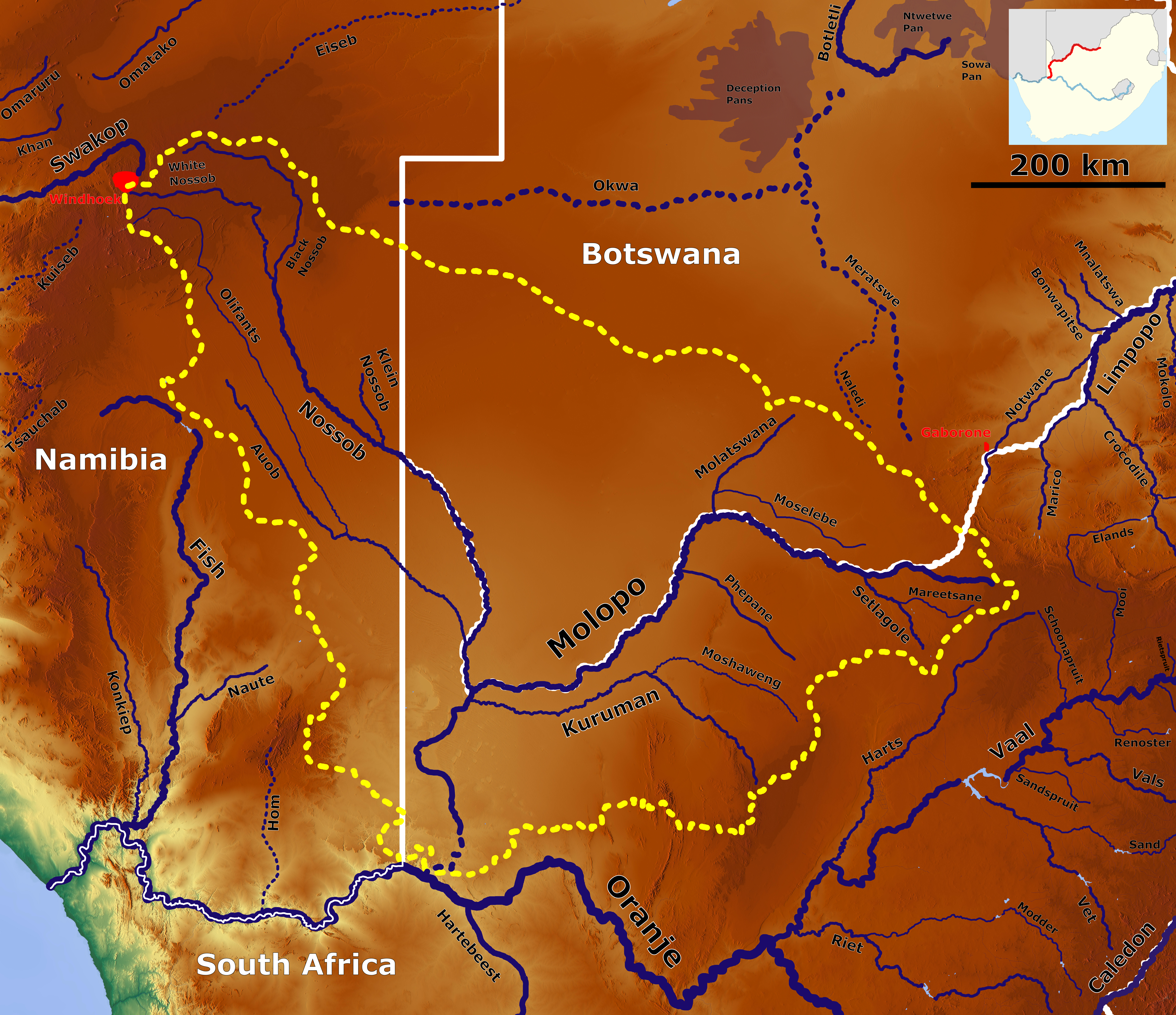
  Location of the lower Orange river (bottom) and some of its tributaries
  - Fish River
  - Konkiep River
  - Löwen River
  - Molopo River (South Africa, Botswana)
    - Nossob River
      - Auob River
        - Oanob River
        - Olifants River
        - Skaap River
      - Black Nossob River
      - Klein Nossob River
      - White Nossob River
- Orawab River
- Swakop River
  - Gami Kaub River
  - Kaan River
  - Khan River
    - Etiro River
    - Slang River
  - Omusema River
  - Otjiseva River
  - Sney River
  - Tsaobis River
- Ugab River
  - Erundu River
  - Goantagab River
  - Okomize River
  - Ozongombo River
  - Uis River
- Uniab River
  - Aub River
    - Barab River
  - Kaikams River
  - Kawakab River
  - Urenindes River
  - Obob River

== Flowing into the Indian Ocean ==
- Zambezi
  - Kwando River (or Linyanti River or Chobe River)

== Flowing into endorheic basins ==
=== Arasab Pan ===
- Arasab River

=== Etosha Pan ===
- Akazulu River
- Cuvelai River
- Ekuma River
- Etosha River
- Nipele River
- Okatana River
- Omuramba Ovambo
- Omuthiya River
- Oshigambo River

=== Koichab Pan ===
- Koichab River

=== Okau Swamp ===
- Munutum River

=== Okavango Delta ===
- Eiseb River
- Epukiro River
- Daneib River
- Khaudom River
- Nhoma River
- Okavango River
  - Mpungu River
  - Omatako Omuramba
- Otjozondjou River

=== Sossusvlei ===
- Tsauchab
  - Zebra River

=== Tsondabvlei ===
- Tsondab River
  - Diep River
  - Koireb River
  - Noab River

=== Unnamed Pans ===
- Duwisib River

== Evaporating in the desert ==
=== Kalahari ===
- Chapman's River
- Rietfontein River

=== Namib ===
- Kaukausib
- Hunkab River
- Nadas River
- Ondusengo River
- Sechomib River
- Tumas River
- Uguchab River

== Alphabetic list ==
Akazulu River ∘ Arasab River ∘ Auob River

Chapman's River ∘ Cuvelai River

Daneib River ∘ Duwisib River

Eiseb River ∘ Ekuma River ∘ Etosha River ∘ Epukiro River

Fish River

Guruchab

Hoanib River ∘ Hoarisib River ∘ Huab River ∘ Hunkab River

Kaukausib River ∘ Khan River ∘ Khaudom River ∘ Khumib River ∘ Koigab River ∘ Koichab River ∘ Konkiep River ∘ Kuiseb River ∘ Kunene River ∘ Kwando River

Messum River ∘ Mpungu River ∘ Munutum River

Nadas River ∘ Nhoma River ∘ Nipele River ∘ Nossob River

Oanob River ∘ Olifants River ∘ Okatana River ∘ Okavango River ∘ Omaruru River ∘ Omatako Omuramba ∘ Ombuka ∘ Omuramba Ovambo ∘ Omuthiya River ∘ Ondusengo River ∘ Orange River ∘ Orawab River ∘ Oshigambo River ∘ Otjozondjou River

Rietfontein River

Sechomib River ∘ Skaap River ∘ Swakop River

Tsauchab River ∘ Tsondab River ∘ Tumas River

Ugab River ∘ Uguchab River ∘ Uniab River

Zambezi
