= Kaokoland =

Bantustan in South West Africa (1980–1989)

Coordinates: 18°S 13°E

- 1980–1989
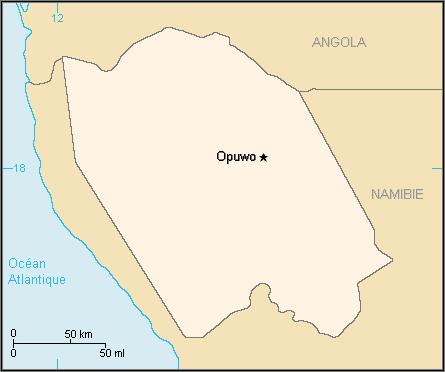
- Map of the Bantustan
- Status: Bantustan de facto administered by Hereroland
- Capital: Opuwo
- History
  - Established: 1980
  - Re-integrated into Namibia: May 1989
- Currency: South African rand
Preceded by	Succeeded by
South West Africa	Namibia

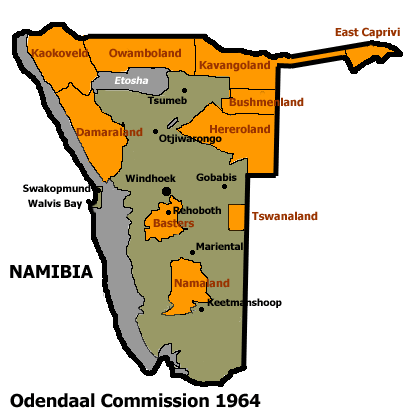
Allocation of land to Bantustans according to the Odendaal Plan. Kaokoland is in the north-west.

Kaokoland was an administrative unit and a Bantustan in northern South West Africa (now Namibia). Established in 1980 during the apartheid era, it was intended to be a self-governing homeland for the Ovahimba, but an actual government was never established, and the territory was administered by the leaders of Hereroland. Like other homelands in South West Africa, the Kaokoland Bantustan was abolished in May 1989, at the beginning of Namibia’s transition to independence.

"Kaokoland" remains as an informal name for the geographic area, while the political unit of administration since 1990 has been Kunene Region. The area is in the Kaokoveld ecoregion. The area is one of the wildest and least populated areas in Namibia, with a population density of one person every 2 km^{2} (1/4 of the national average). The most represented ethnic group is the Himba people, who account for about 5,000 of the overall 16,000 inhabitants of Kaokoland. The main settlement in Kaokoland was the city of Opuwo.

== Geography ==
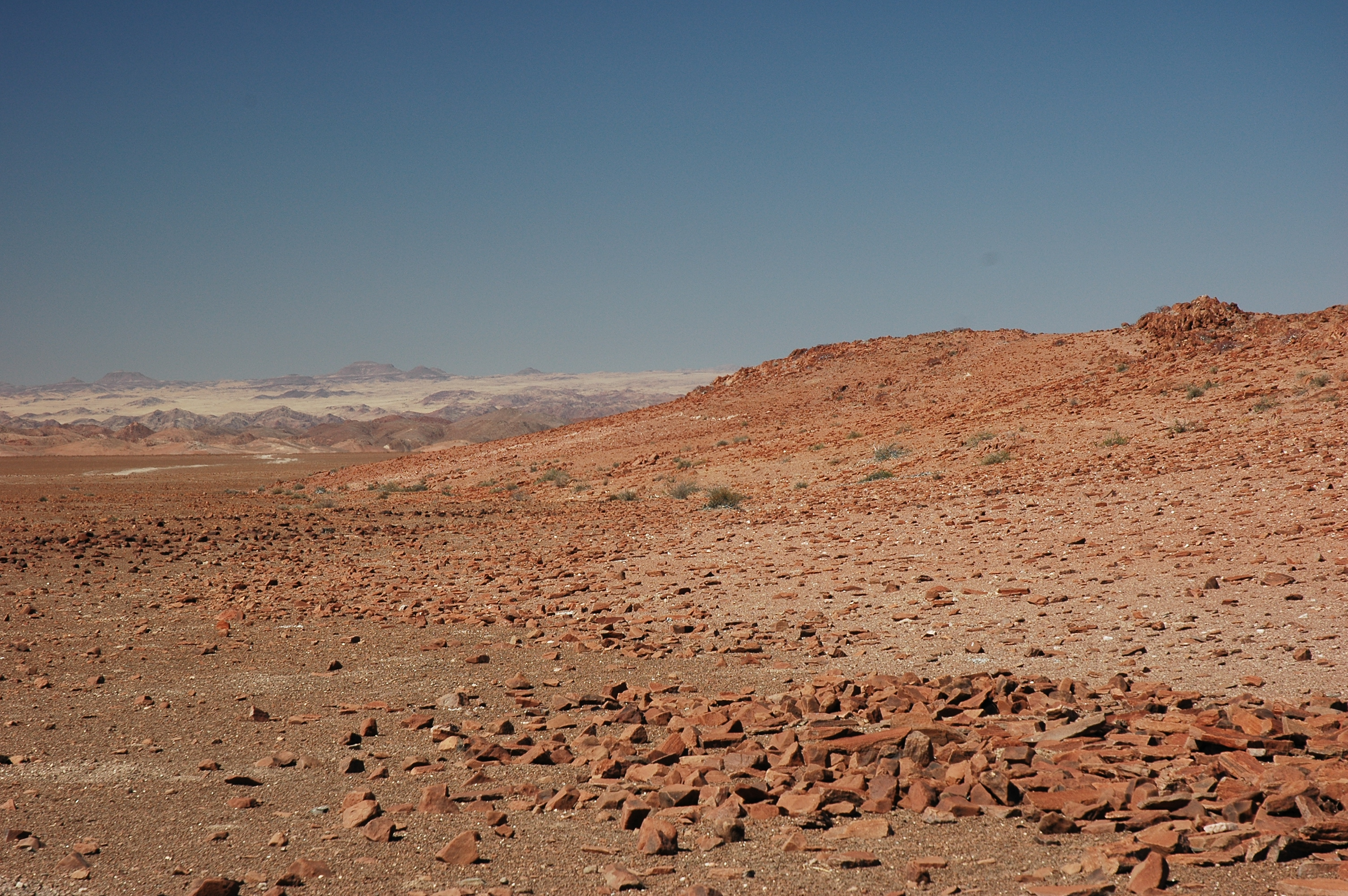
Rocky desert in Kaokoland

The Kaokoland area extends south-north from the Hoanib river to the Kunene river (that also marks the border between Namibia and Angola). It is largely mountainous, with the northern Baynes Mountains reaching their maximum elevation at 2039 m. Other notable mountain ranges of Kaokoland include the Otjihipa Mountains (to the north) and the Hartmann Mountains (to the east). The land is generally dry and rocky, especially to the south, where it borders on the Namib Desert; nevertheless, it has several rivers as well as falls. The most notable falls in Kaokoland are the Ruacana Falls (120 m high, 700 m wide) and the Epupa Falls, both formed by the Kunene river. The northern part of Kaokoland is greener, with vegetation thriving valleys such as the Marienfluss and Hartmann Valley.

== History ==
Before colonialism, Kaokoland was mostly inhabited by the Ovambo, Nama and Herero people. In the second half of the 19th century, a group of Herero crossed the Kunene River, migrating north to what is now Angola, joining with the Bushmen in Southern Angola; the modern day Himba people originated from this Angolan Herero group. In 1884, Kaokoland became part of German South West Africa and the Namibian Herero people changed much of their habits and costumes as a consequence of German rule. After World War I, South Africa received the mandate from the League of Nations to administer the territory of Namibia, which became, for all practical purposes, a province of South Africa. South Africa also applied to Namibia the principles of apartheid, including the creation of distinct Bantustans (homelands) for different African ethnic groups. Kaokoland was thus established as a Bantustan for the Himba people, who in the 1920s had come back from Angola into Namibia. Despite its scarce population, Kaokoland was greatly affected by the struggle for independence of Namibia and most specifically by the so-called "bush war" that was fought across the border with Angola (i.e., in Kaokoland).

== The Himba people ==
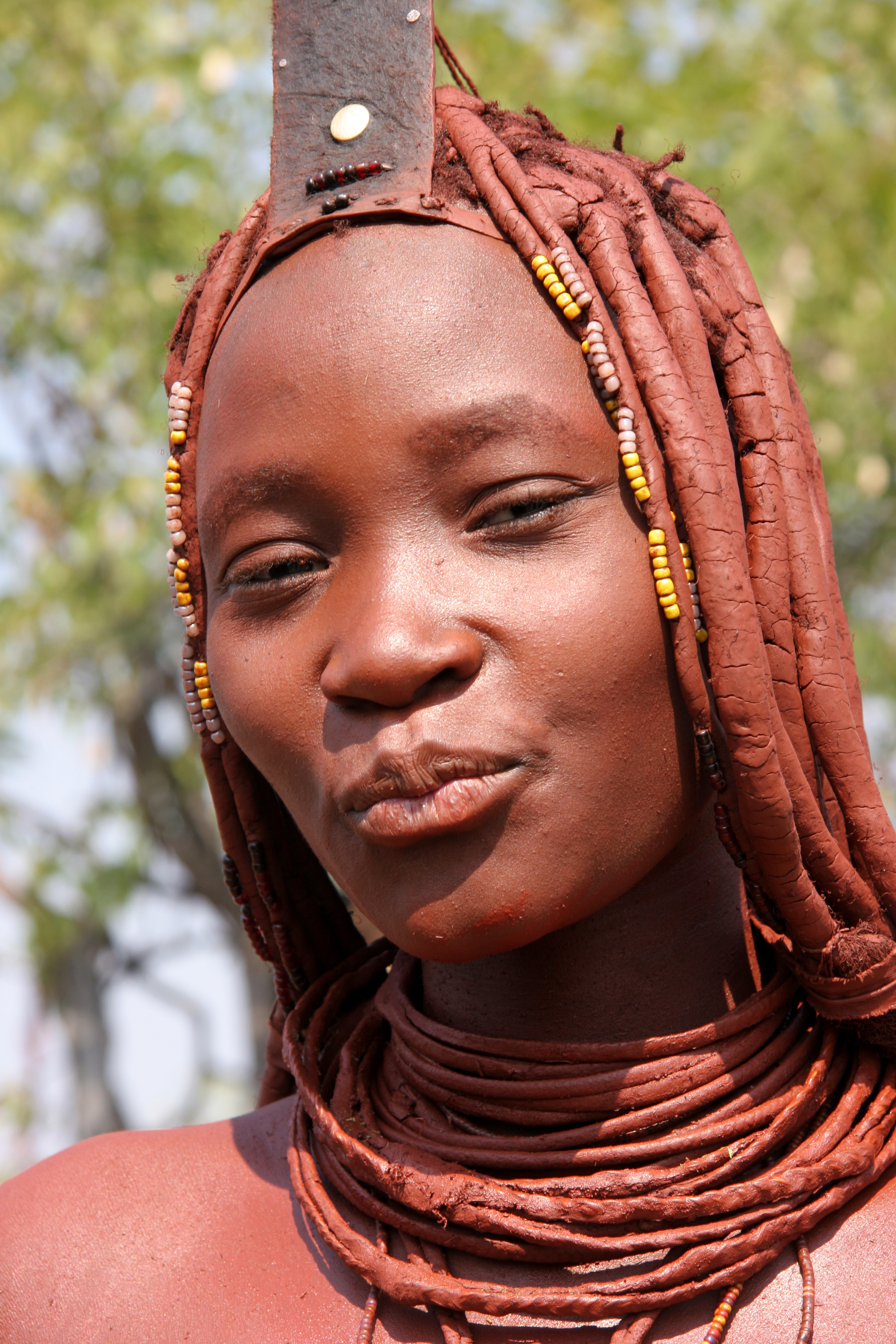
Himba woman

The Himba people are the descendants of a Herero group that got isolated from the others in the 19th century. While the Herero people later experienced German rule and drastically changed their lifestyle as well as their costumes, the Himba retained much of their traditional, nomadic and pastoral habits. In recent times, contacts between Himbas and Western tourists are becoming more and more common, especially in the most easily accessible regions of Kaokoland (e.g., the surroundings of Opuwo). While this has partially affected the Himba culture, Himbas have essentially remained faithful to their tradition.

== Fauna ==
Fauna in Kaokoland suffered from a severe crippling between 1977 and 1982, as well as from poaching throughout the 1970s, but has been recovering afterwards. It includes several desert-dwelling species, most notably a population of desert elephants that are sometimes classified as a distinct subspecies of African elephants because of their shorter legs and specific, desert-adapted behaviour (the only other place in Africa where elephants have adapted to a desert environment being Mali, on the border of the Sahara desert). Its longer legs, bigger feet, and incredible ability to withstand periods of drought all gave valid reasons to think so. Today, however, it is not considered a different species, rather regarded as only 'desert adapted.' The herds in this area remain separate from other elephant herds in Namibia and only appear to have longer legs and bigger feet, because they eat less than elephants living in more food abundant areas such as Etosha National Park, the Caprivi, and the Chobe region in Botswana.

The desert elephant populate a three-thousand square kilometre range and regularly travel up to two hundred kilometres in search of water. They only drink every three or four days, compared to elephants in Etosha drinking 100 to 200 L of water a day. They also seem to be more environmentally conscious than other elephants: unlike other elephants, the desert-adapted elephant rarely knock over trees, break branches, or tear away bark.

They are commonly roaming the dry riverbeds of the westward flowing Huab, Hoanib, Hoarusib and Khumib rivers. It is along these riverbeds that the animals find the occasional spring-fed waterhole and most of their nutrient-rich foods: mopane bark, tamarisk, reeds, the pods, bark and leaves of the ana tree. On a typical day, desert elephants travel up to sixty kilometres over rocky, difficult terrain between feeding areas and waterholes. When water is truly scarce, as in times of drought, they dig holes, commonly known as gorras, in the dry riverbeds. Water seeps up from below the surface creating a much needed water source for themselves, and for other animals in the area; unlike other elephants, which drink daily, desert elephants have been known to survive without water for up to four days.

Black rhinos were extinguished in the area in 1983, but they have been reintroduced. Other species found in Kaokoland include oryxes, kudus, springboks, ostriches, giraffes and mountain zebras.

== Tourism and transportation ==
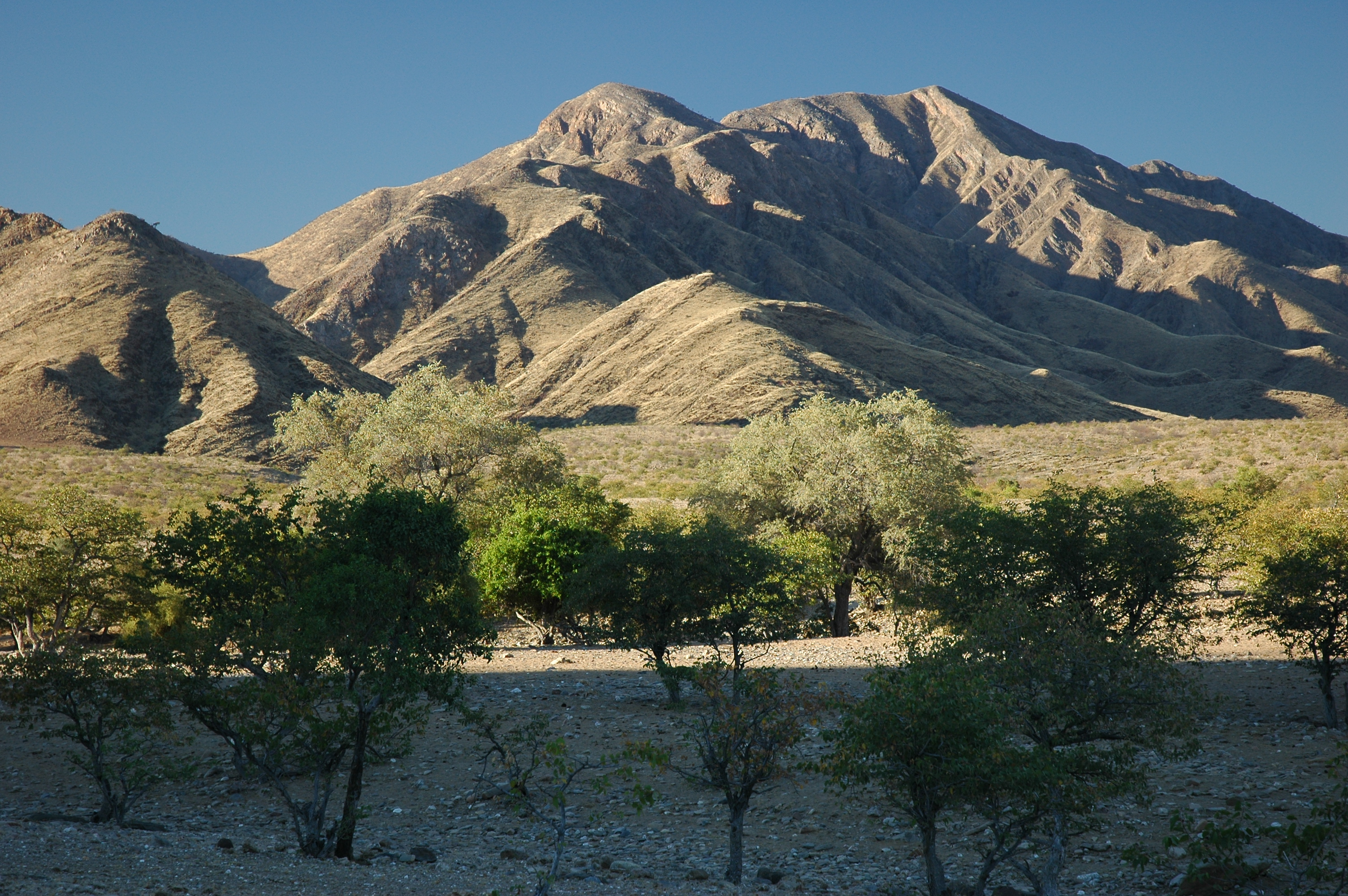
Mountains in Kaokoland

After the end of the bush war, Kaokoland has become a common tourist destination in Namibia, due to its proximity to the Etosha National Park (to the south), the unspoiled nature (with several spots suitable for activities such as rafting and trekking), and the opportunity to visit traditional Himba villages. Notable landmarks in the area include the Epupa Falls, Sesfontein, Himba villages, and the Ondurusa Rapids.

Kaokoland is one of the wildest regions of Southern Africa, with very few roads and structures. The only road that is accessible to non-4WD vehicles is the one connecting Sesfontein and Opuwo. Many roads in Kaokoland are in very bad condition and may be challenging for 4WDs, especially during the rainy season. Most services, such as shops, a hospital and a fuel station, are only found in Opuwo.
