= Kaokoveld =

Desert ecoregion in Angola and Namibia

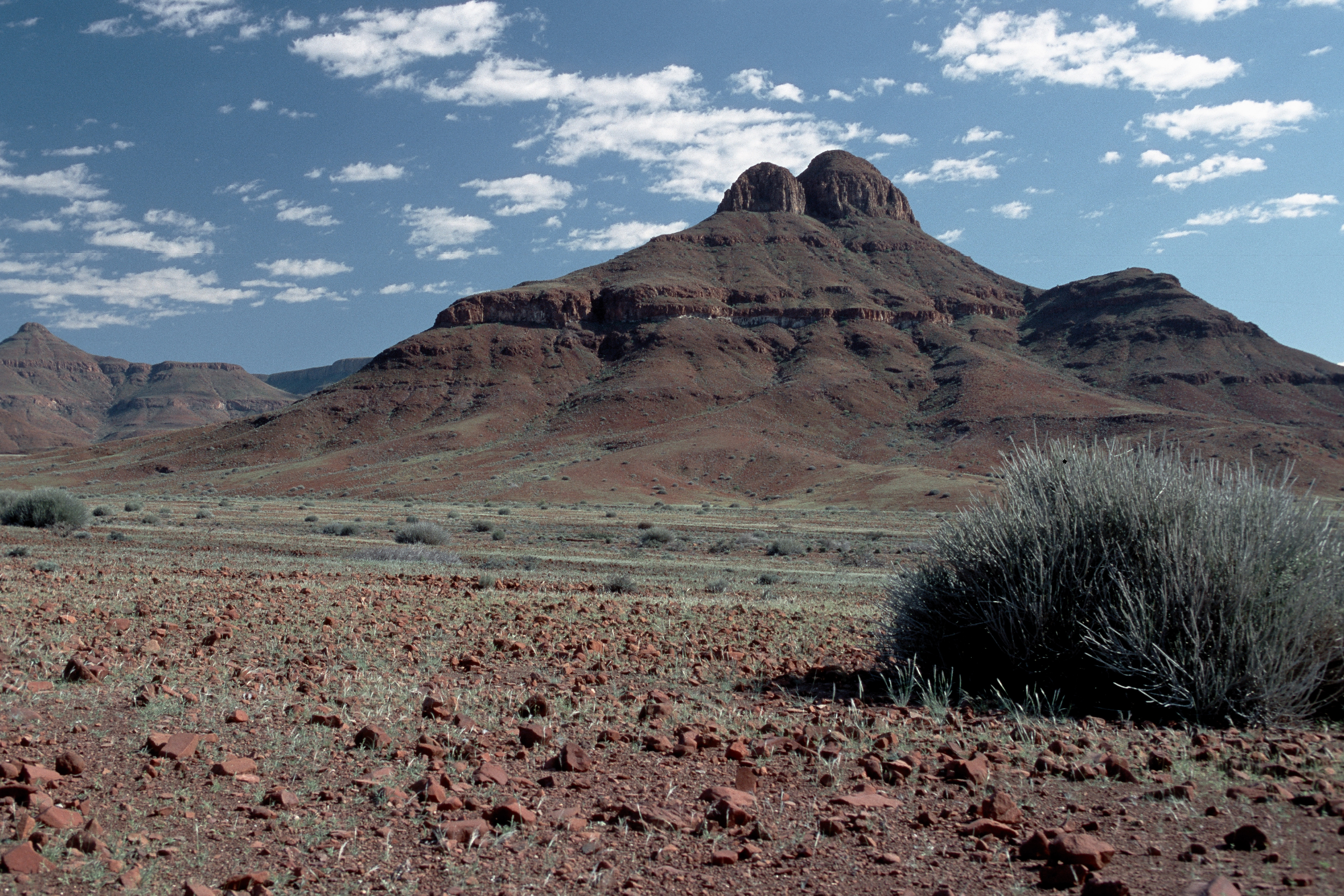
- Landscape north of Orupembe, Namibia

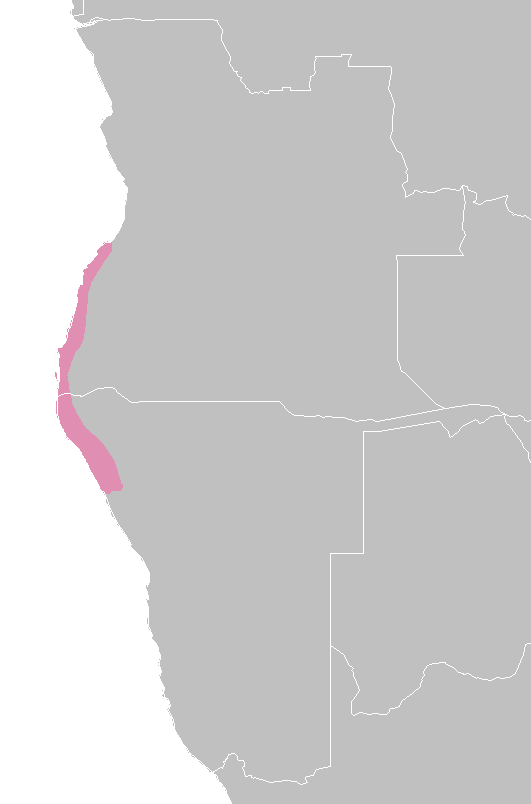
- Location of the Kaokoveld

Ecology
- Realm: Afrotropical
- Biome: deserts and xeric shrublands
- Borders: Angolan miombo woodlands; Namib desert; Namibian savanna woodlands

Geography
- Area: 45,600 km^{2} (17,600 mi^{2})
- Countries: Angola; Namibia

Conservation
- Conservation status: Critical/endangered

The Kaokoveld Desert is a coastal desert of northern Namibia and southern Angola.

== Setting ==
The Kaokoveld Desert occupies a coastal strip covering 45,700 square kilometers (17,600 sq mi), from 13° to 21°S and is bounded by the Atlantic Ocean to the west, the Namibian savanna woodlands to the east, and the Namib Desert to the south. It includes the Moçâmedes Desert of southern Angola. The Kaokoveld is a harsh desert of drifting sand dunes and rocky mountains. It receives most of its rainfall during summer, which distinguishes it from the adjacent Namib Desert to the south, which receives most of its rain during winter. The Kunene River is the only permanent watercourse but many dry riverbeds (including the Hoanib, Hoarusib and Khumib Rivers) carry moisture through the desert and are home to animals including elephants, black rhinos, and giraffe. Other than those the area is ancient desert sand, moistened by occasional coastal fog.

== Flora ==
The Kaokoveld is home to the Welwitschia mirabilis, a plant that has no close living relatives.

== Fauna ==
The Kaokoveld is home to a number of endemic reptiles while large mammals including desert elephants (Loxodonta africana), black rhinos (Diceros bicornis) and giraffes (Giraffa camelopardalis) visit the riverbeds. There is a great deal of birdlife including the endemic Cinderella waxbill (Glaucestrilda thomensis) on the Kunene River.

== Threats and preservation ==
The Skeleton Coast National Park runs for 500 km along the coast of Namibia and is the main protected area in the region, along with other smaller conservancies inland. Much of the area was formerly protected under Game Reserve 2, which was reduced in size to become Etosha National Park in 1967, with a subsequent increase in poaching and more recently uncontrolled off-road driving. There is an area of sand dunes in Iona National Park in Angola.
