= Eiseb River =

Ephemeral river in the Kalahari Desert

The Eiseb River, also known as the Eiseb Omuramba, is an ephemeral river or omuramba in the Kalahari Desert of eastern Namibia and north-western Botswana. It forms part of the Eiseb-Epukiro drainage system and drains eastwards towards the Okavango Delta.

The river is one of several fossil or intermittent river courses in the northern Kalahari. Like other omiramba, it carries surface water only after rainfall events, while its riverbed and associated alluvial deposits are important for groundwater, grazing, settlement and local water use in an otherwise semi-arid environment.

== Geography ==
The Eiseb River is located in the Kalahari sandveld of eastern Namibia and western Botswana. It is associated with the Omaheke Region of Namibia and flows eastwards into the wider Okavango drainage area. In Namibia's national river listings, the Eiseb is grouped among rivers and omiramba draining towards the Okavango Delta.

The river belongs to the Eiseb-Epukiro river basin, a basin that lies between Eiseb and Epukiro. The basin borders Botswana to the east, reaches southwards towards Gobabis, and covers parts of the Omaheke and Otjozondjupa regions of Namibia.

The nearby settlement of Eiseb, also known as Eiseb Block, is named after the river. The settlement lies in the Otjombinde Constituency of the Omaheke Region.

== Omuramba character ==
The Eiseb is an omuramba, a term used in Namibia and Botswana for ancient or fossil riverbeds in the Kalahari. Omiramba are usually dry for much of the year but may hold surface water after heavy rain. They are often more fertile than surrounding Kalahari sand plains because their channels contain finer alluvial sediments.

Omiramba in north-eastern Namibia and north-western Botswana mostly begin in central parts of Namibia and run towards central Botswana. Many are believed to have been more active under wetter climatic conditions in the past, but in the present climate they flow only intermittently and for limited distances after rainfall.

In the northern Kalahari woodlands, fossil river courses such as the Eiseb, Epukiro, Omatako, Khaudom, Nhoma, Mpungu and Otjozondjou are among the main alluvial features interrupting the sandy landscape. These river courses and associated pans commonly contain fine-grained alluvial silts or clays and have historically provided water for people, livestock and wildlife, either as surface water after rain or through shallow wells.

== Eiseb-Epukiro basin ==
The Eiseb-Epukiro basin is one of Namibia's water basins. It has a reported surface area of 10,665 km^{2} and an estimated annual water yield of about 20 million m^{3}, mainly from groundwater.

The basin is important because surface water is irregular, making groundwater the main water resource for settlements, livestock and other local uses. This pattern is typical of many Kalahari omiramba, where drainage lines may be dry at the surface but remain important as recharge zones, shallow-well locations or groundwater-bearing alluvial systems.

The Eiseb-Epukiro basin is also mentioned in broader water-resource studies of the Cubango-Okavango region. A synthesis report for the Cubango-Okavango River Basin Water Audit identified irrigation areas east and north-east of the Omatako Dam and further east near Otjinene in the Eiseb-Epukiro national water basin.

== Geology and groundwater ==
The lower Eiseb area is associated with the Eiseb Graben, a tectonic structure in eastern Namibia. Geological work in the Gam area identified north-east-trending faults south of the Eiseb Omuramba that coincide with displaced dune crests and influence present-day drainage patterns.

Simmonds and Smalley reported that these structures are interpreted as recent faults forming a south-western extension of the Okavango Delta graben structure. In Namibia, this structure has been referred to as the Eiseb Graben. Drilling in the centre of the Eiseb Graben near the Botswana border confirmed Kalahari sediments more than 250 metres thick.

The Eiseb Graben is significant for groundwater because saturated lower Kalahari sediments can provide abstractable groundwater in parts of the graben. Studies in north-eastern Namibia have shown that groundwater exploration in thick Kalahari sediments can be difficult, and that drilling methods affect the detection and development of low-yield water-bearing layers.

== Ecology and land use ==
The Eiseb River lies within the broader Kalahari environment, where surface water is scarce and seasonal. The alluvial sediments of omiramba provide relatively fertile zones compared with surrounding deep sands. These areas are used by people and livestock and may support vegetation and grazing during periods when the surrounding sandveld is less productive.

In the Northern Kalahari Woodlands of Namibia, agricultural activity and livestock keeping are important land uses. Drinking water is commonly pumped from aquifers and used for domestic purposes, crops, livestock and wildlife. The Eiseb and related omiramba therefore form part of the local water-resource base for rural settlements and pastoral livelihoods in eastern Namibia.

== Water management ==
Water management in the Eiseb-Epukiro basin is shaped by the basin's aridity, intermittent surface flow and dependence on groundwater. Namibia's integrated water resources planning treats the Eiseb-Epukiro as a distinct basin for water-resource management purposes.

Recent Namibian agricultural and water-resource planning documents identify several basins, including the Eiseb-Epukiro, as being under pressure or vulnerable to water-resource constraints. These concerns are linked to the wider need for integrated water-resource management, sustainable groundwater abstraction and climate-resilient land and water planning in Namibia's dryland regions.

== Relationship with the Okavango system ==
The Eiseb is part of the group of intermittent streams and fossil drainage lines associated with the Okavango Delta and the Kalahari Basin. The Okavango Delta is an endorheic wetland system in northern Botswana, where water entering the delta is lost mainly through evapotranspiration and infiltration rather than flowing to the sea.

Unlike the perennial Cubango-Okavango River, the Eiseb contributes to the system as an intermittent Kalahari drainage line. It is therefore better understood as a seasonal or fossil river course within the wider Okavango-Kalahari drainage environment rather than as a continuously flowing tributary.

== See also ==
- Omuramba
- Kalahari Desert
- Kalahari Basin
- Okavango Delta
- List of rivers of Namibia
- List of rivers of Botswana
- Water supply and sanitation in Namibia
