= Ekuma River =

River in Namibia

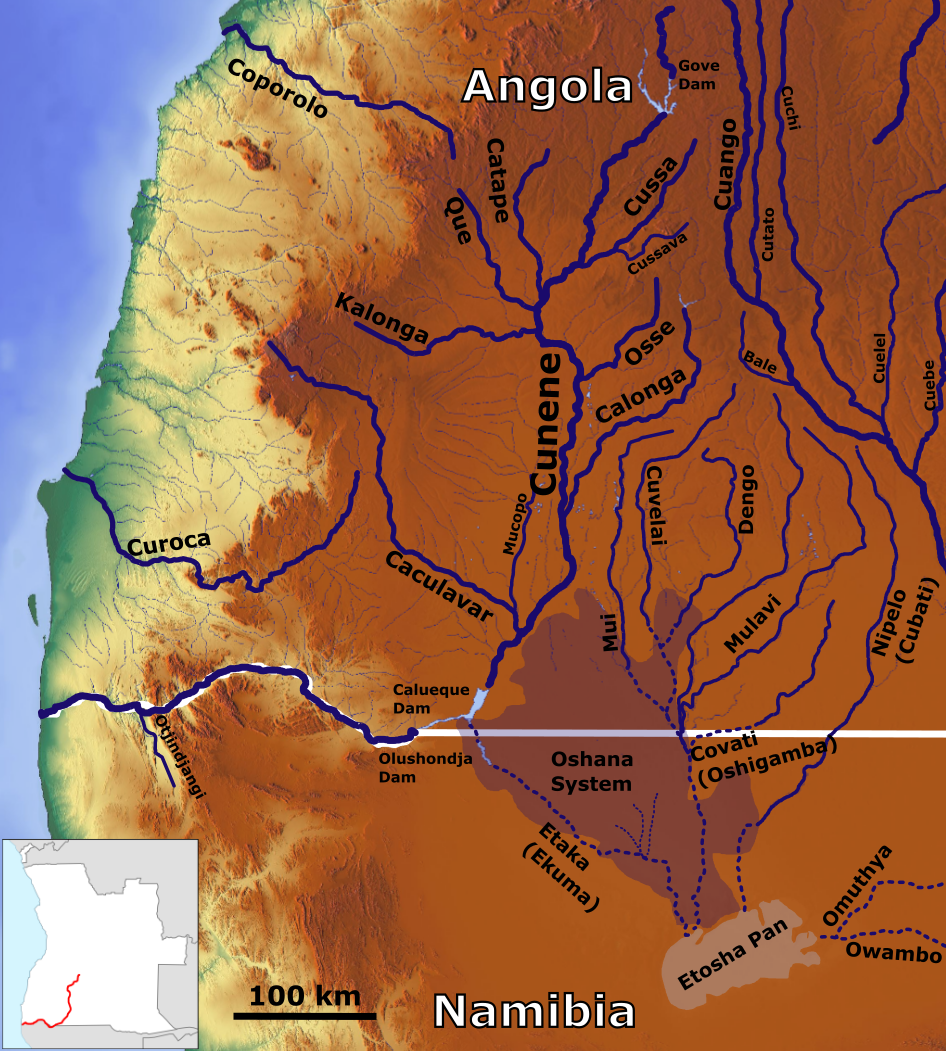
The Kunene River with its Tributaries, the Etosha Pan and the Oshana system with the Ekuma (center down)

The Ekuma River is one of three rivers that supply most of water to the pan in the Etosha National Park in Namibia, the other two being the Oshigambo River and the Omurambo Ovambo River. The Ekumo is an ephemeral river that occasionally flows, or forms pools, during the rainy season. It originates from the southern shores of Lake Oponono and is 250 kilometres (160 mi) long.
