= Omuramba Ovambo =

Dry river bed in Namibia

Coordinates: 18°44′20″S 17°01′38″E

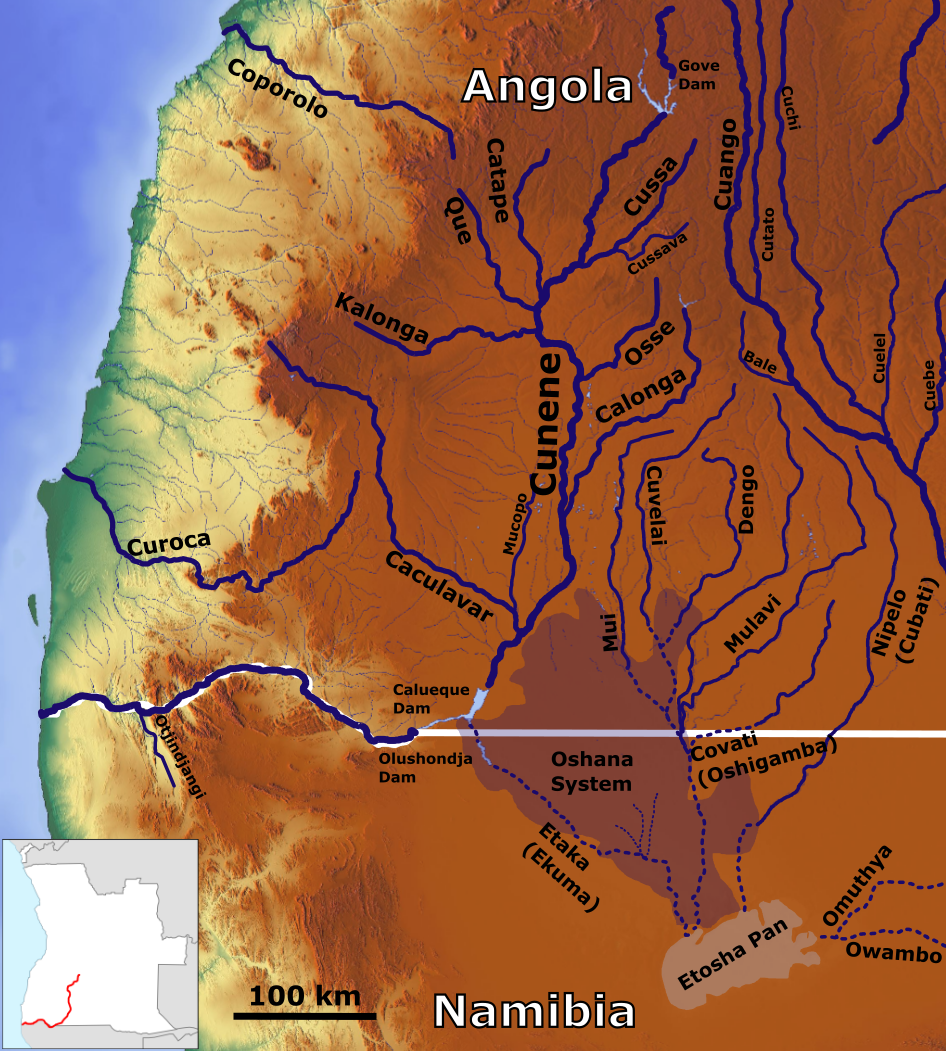
The Kunene River with its Tributaries, the Etosha Pan, the Oshana system and the Ovambo (Bottom right)

The Omuramba Ovambo is an omuramba (dry river bed) in Namibia. It originates about five kilometers from Tsintsabis and flows into Etosha Pan. Its catchment area is 15,784 square kilometres (6,094 sq mi). This river only flows when there is heavy rainfall. The river has almost no organic life in it due to its fluctuating water levels. The river banks are filled with rows of Camelthorn and Acacia trees which provide shade to the surrounding animals and San people who live in the area.

== San people ==
The main towns in which the San live in Namibia are Tsintsabis and Tsumkwe near the sand valley "Boesmanland". Near the river is a large village with a community of San which mostly depend on the river's resources. These people have very little money, and unfortunately are very secluded from the rest of society so they must buy most things at a very high price due to travel costs. Fortunately, once or twice every year during heavy rainfall the bushmen have the chance to gather water (as Tsintsabis is a very dry and hot place) and also catch fish, although preservation can sometimes be an issue. The most abundant fish is the Barbel due to its ability to burrow under muddy ground to keep itself safe from the harsh air and sun when the river is not flowing.

== Tourism ==
The Omuramba Ovambo has become a tourist attraction, where many people go for a relaxing day trip. One can barbecue on the banks of the Omaramba, and due to the lack of crocodiles, it is a safe place to swim.

== See also ==
- List of rivers of Namibia
