= Desert elephant =

African bush elephants in deserts of Africa

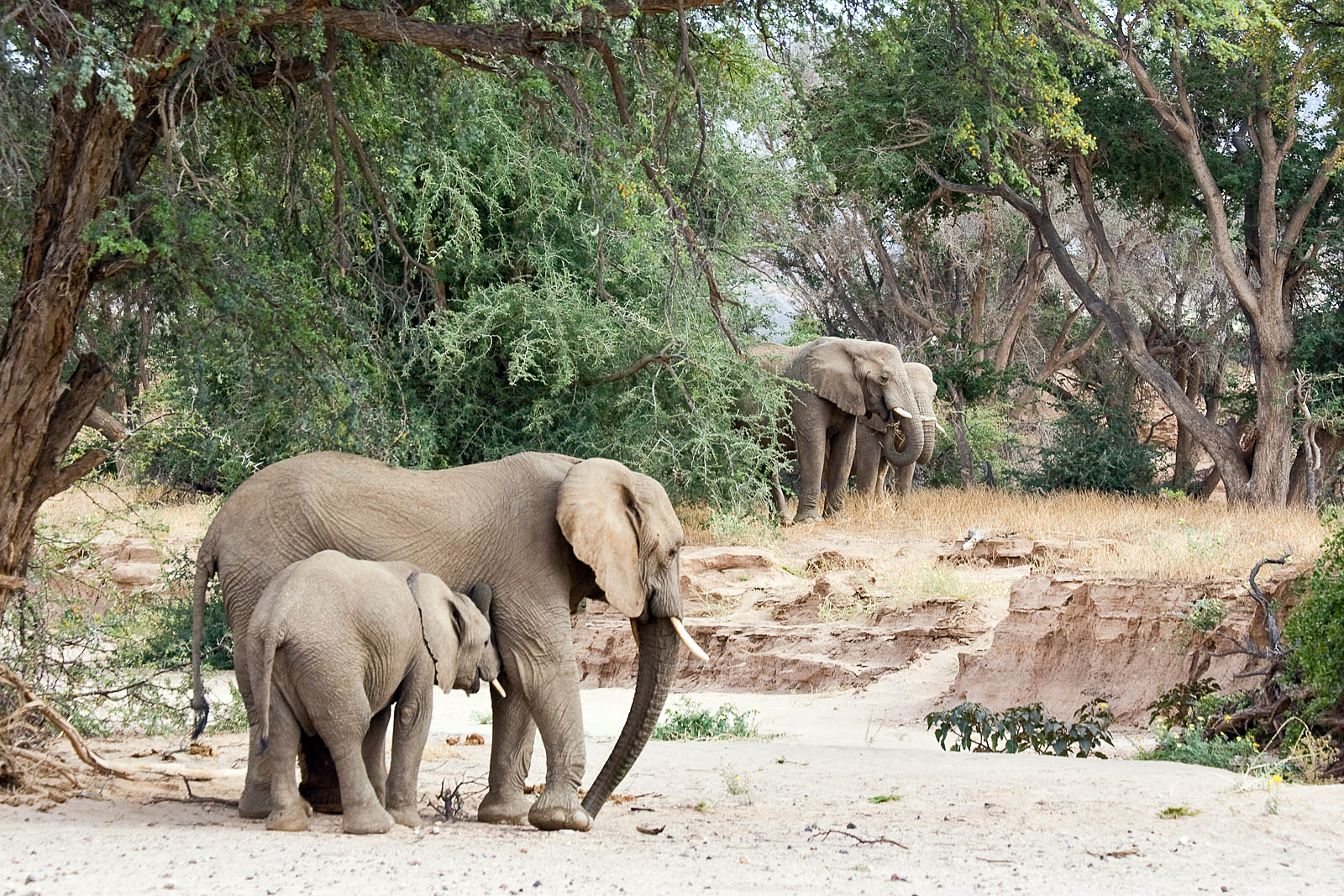
Desert elephants at the dried-up Huab River in Namibia

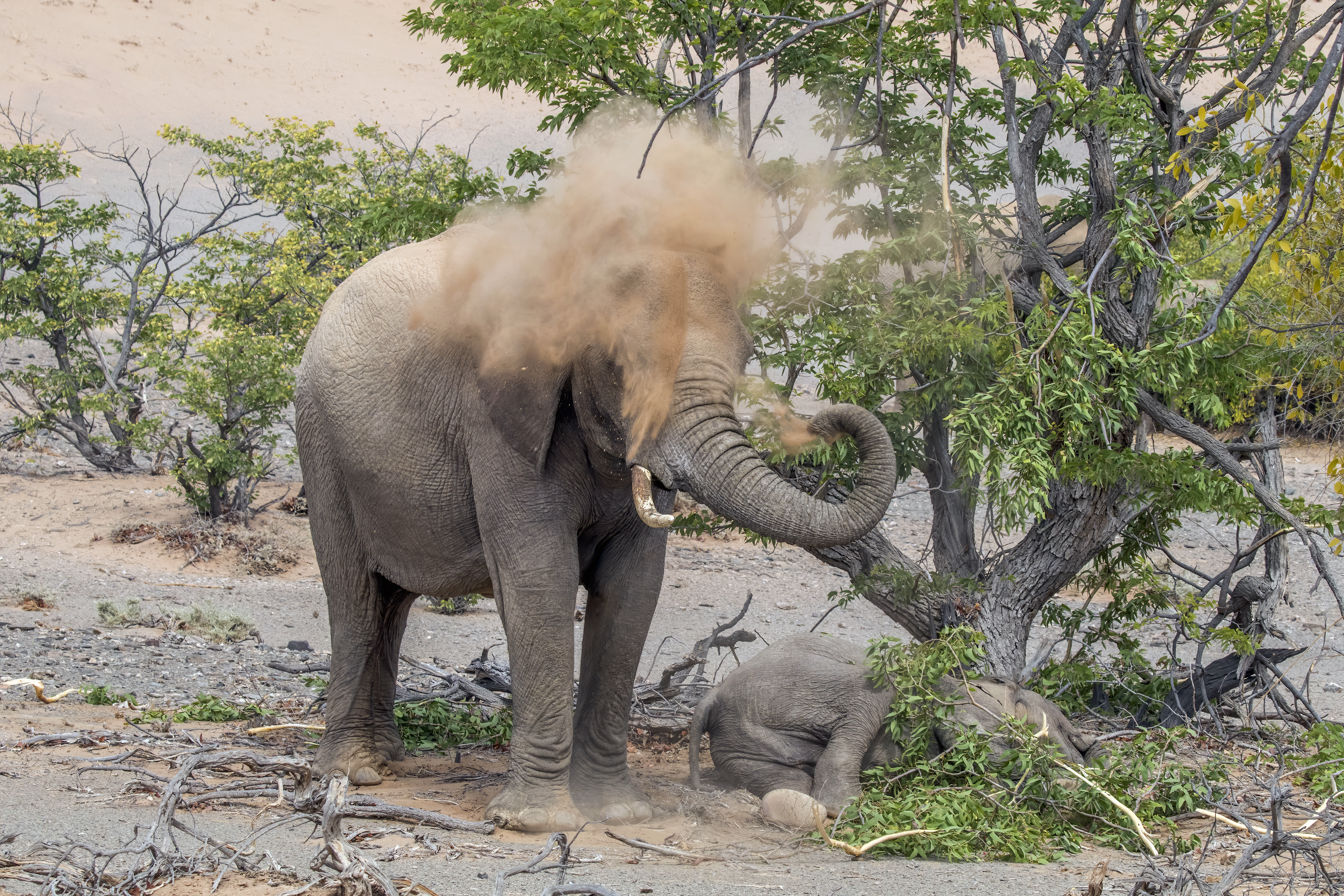
Female spraying sand to keep cool while standing guard over her calf, Damaraland, Namibia

Desert elephants or desert-adapted elephants are a population of African bush elephants (Loxodonta africana), but they were once believed to be a subspecies. These elephants reside in the Namib and Sahara deserts. They are currently only found in Namibia.

Elephants have traditionally lived in desert areas. In the early 20th century, there were approximately 3,000 elephants in the Kunene Region. By the 1980s the population had greatly diminished. Conservation measures have been put in place since then, and by 2013 the number of elephants had increased to about 600. In 1995–1996 there was an abundance of rainfall in Namibia, which revived the desert environment. Elephants then expanded southwards to the Ugab River.

During the war for independence the desert elephants migrated north for safety, but they returned to the Ugab River in the mid-1990s. By that time many indigenous people had moved into the area following Namibia's independence. Many of these new residents had no experience living with wild elephants.

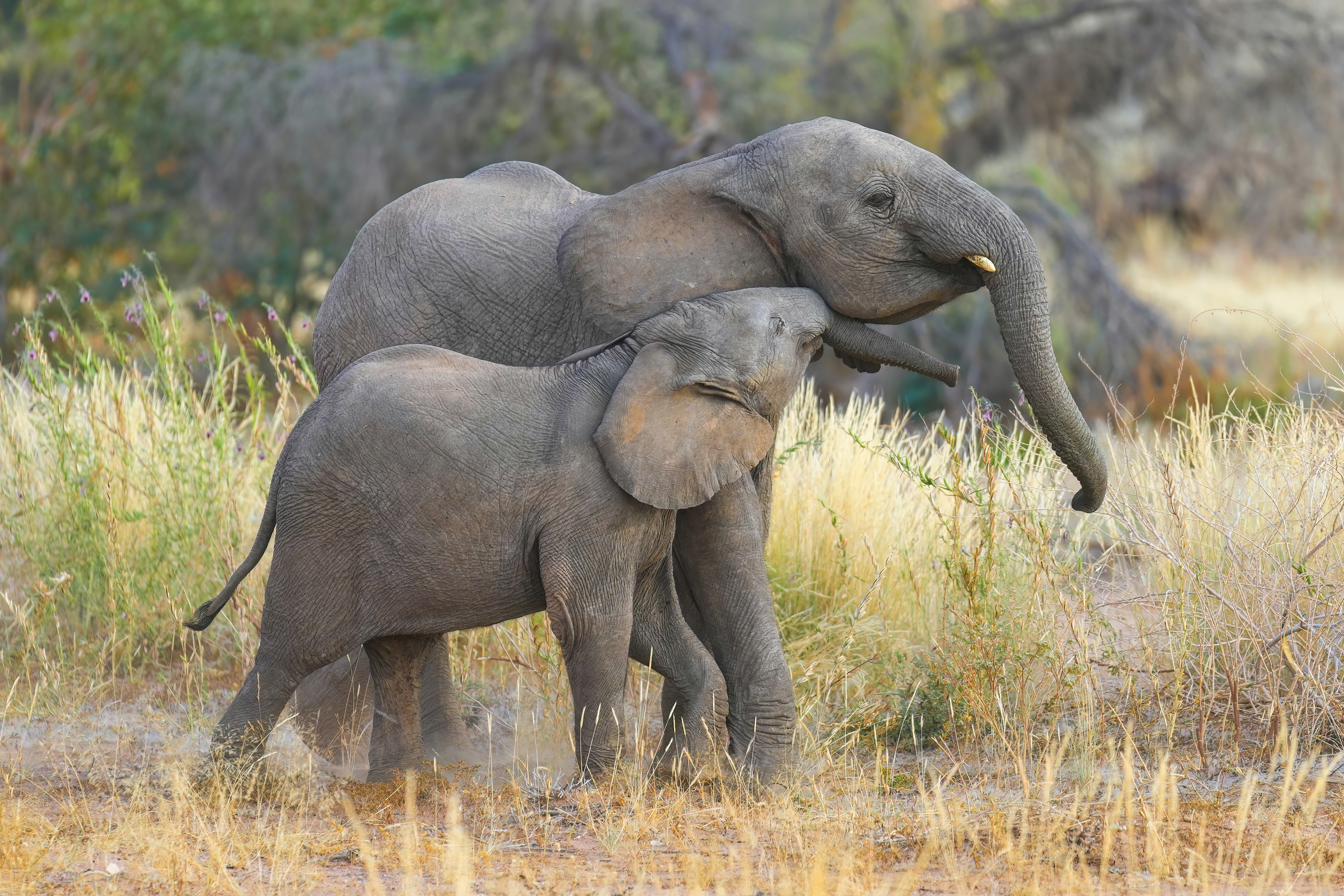
Desert-adapted baby elephants cuddling in Damaraland, Namibia

In the Hoanib River area, male elephants have tusks and a third of the female elephants are without tusks. Adult bull desert elephants usually roam over large areas alone. One was recorded travelling between the Skeleton Coast National Park and the Etosha National Park within the span of a few months. Other bulls have occasionally moved into that area from better-watered regions.

At certain times during the year they move inland along narrow traditional paths to mountain areas in search of myrrh bushes (Commiphora spp.) which seem to be a favorite source of food for them.

Desert elephants live in small family groups that usually consist of a female elephant and her offspring or two sisters and their dependent young. These groups tend to stay near ephemeral rivers where there are more resources. Some groups reside in the Hoarusib River valley. A single group will stay permanently near the Hoanib River, while other groups move between the two rivers. They usually make the trek (43 miles (69 km)) in a single night, which is when the temperature lowers.

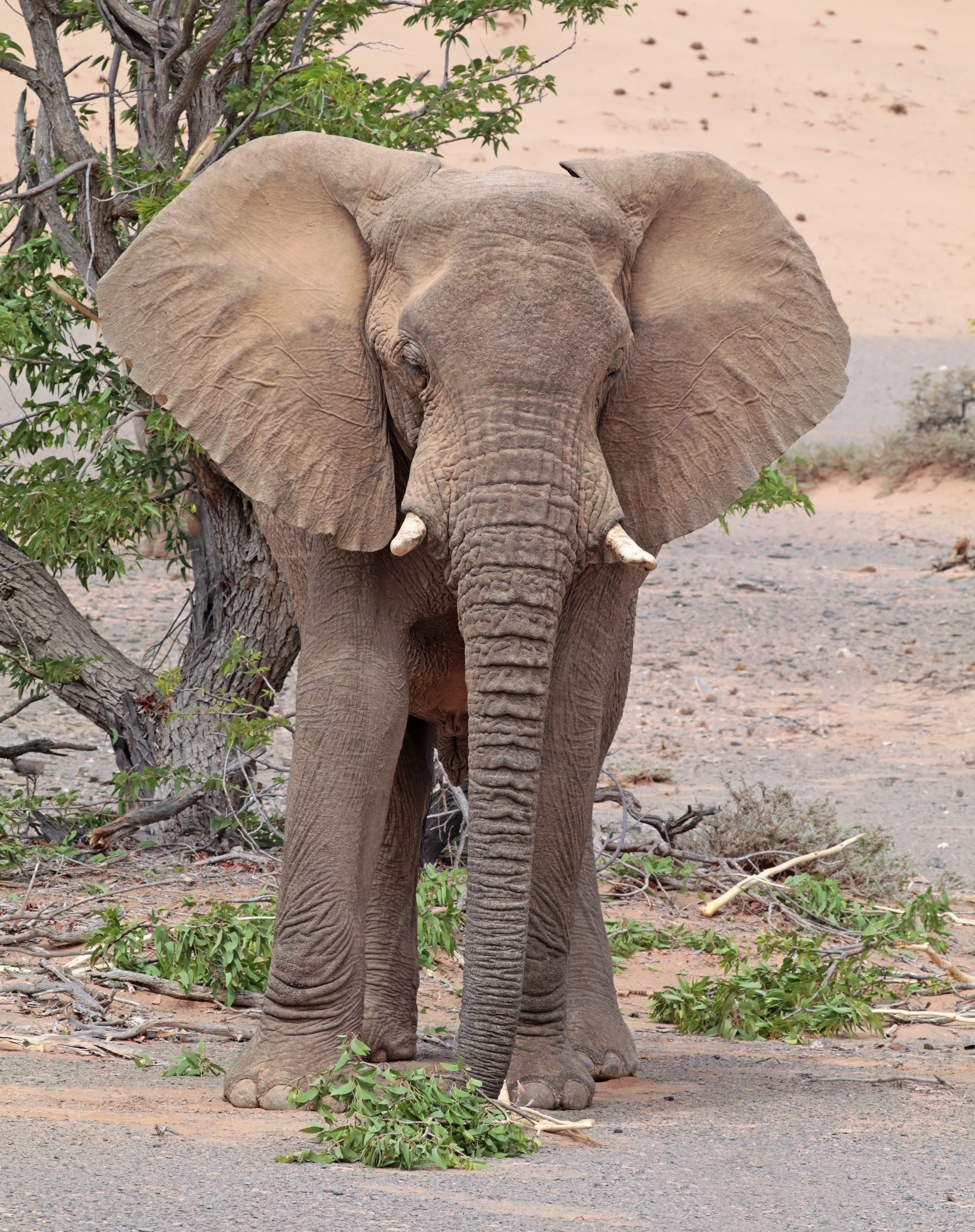
Male

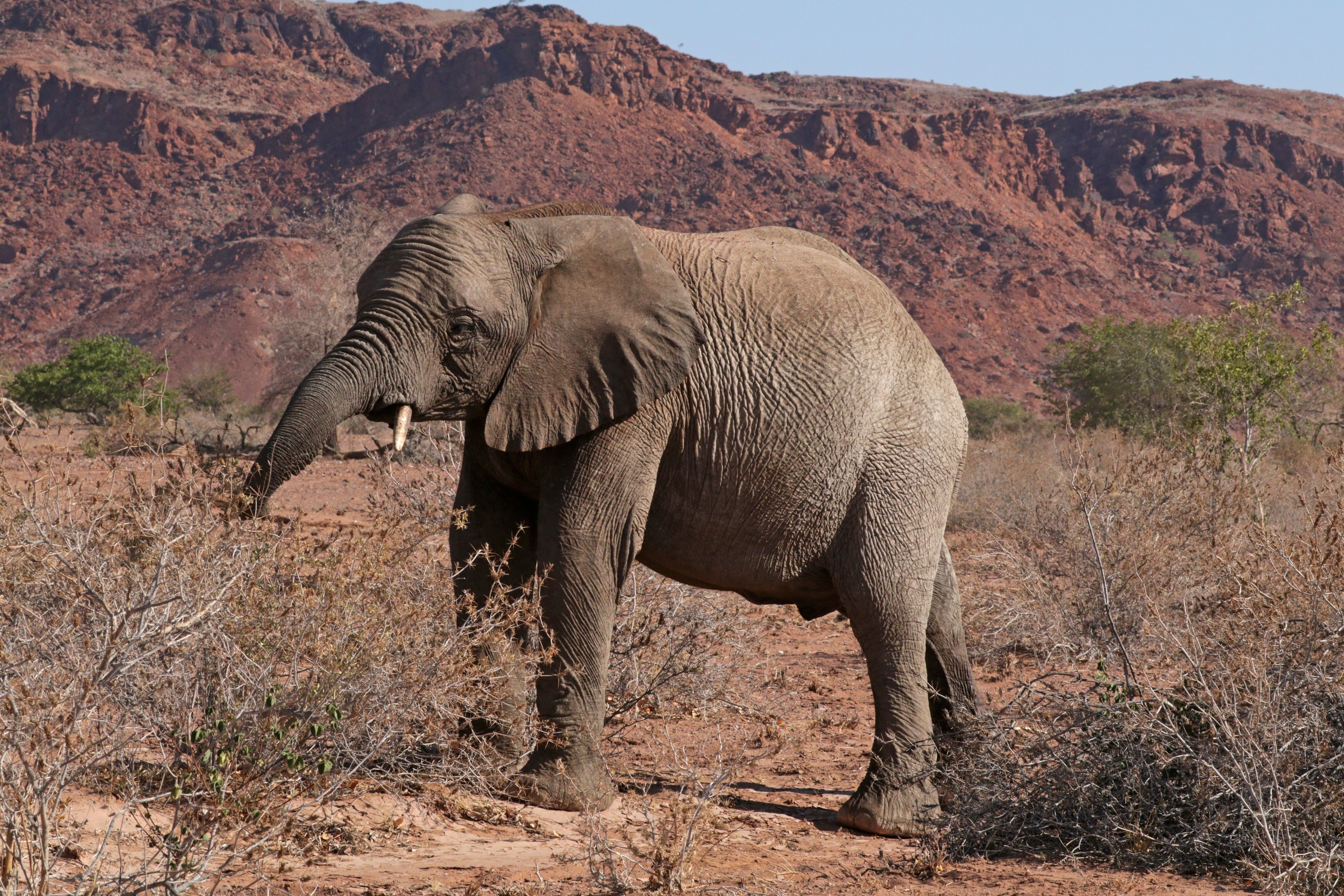
Young female

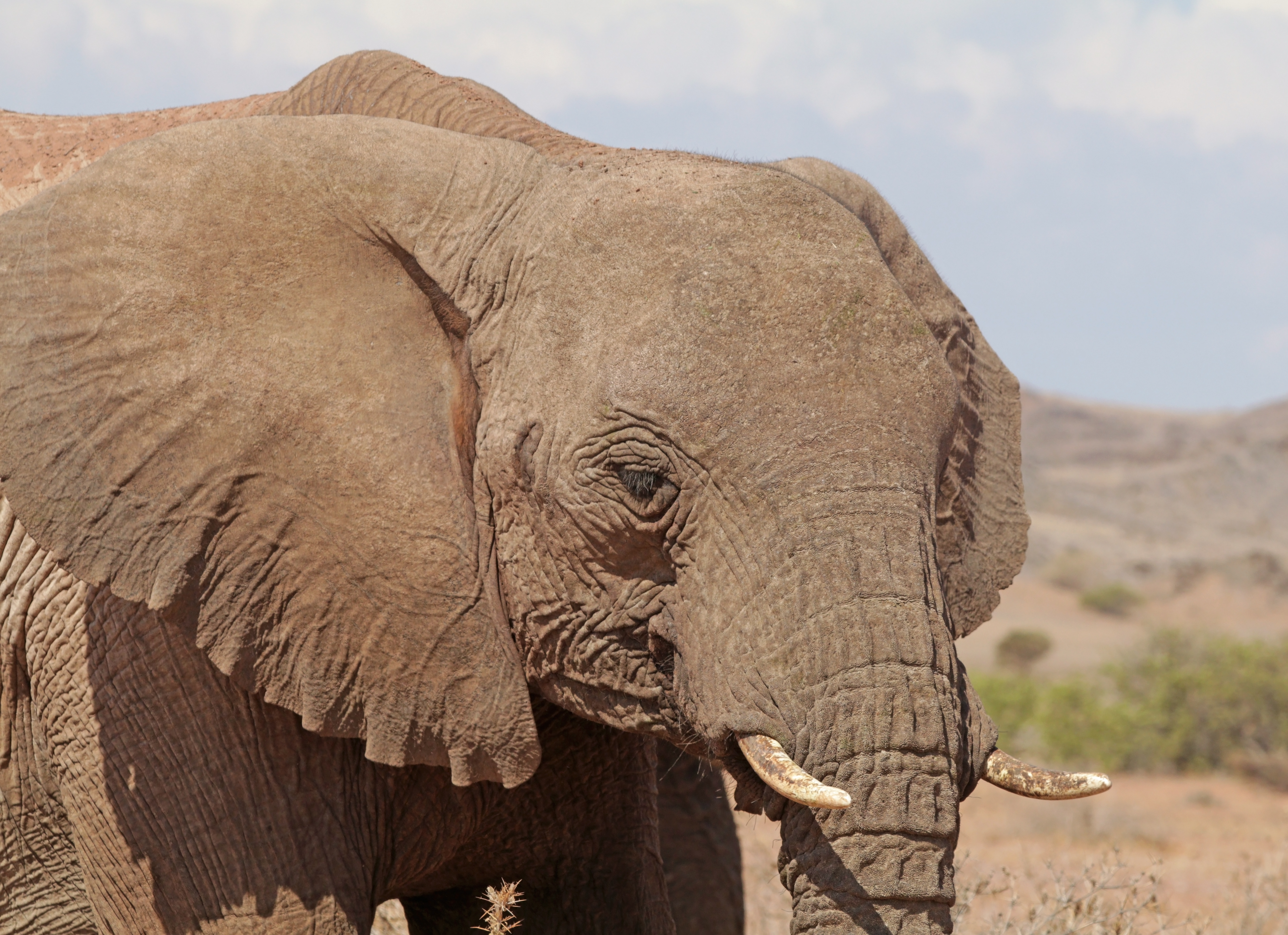
Female head

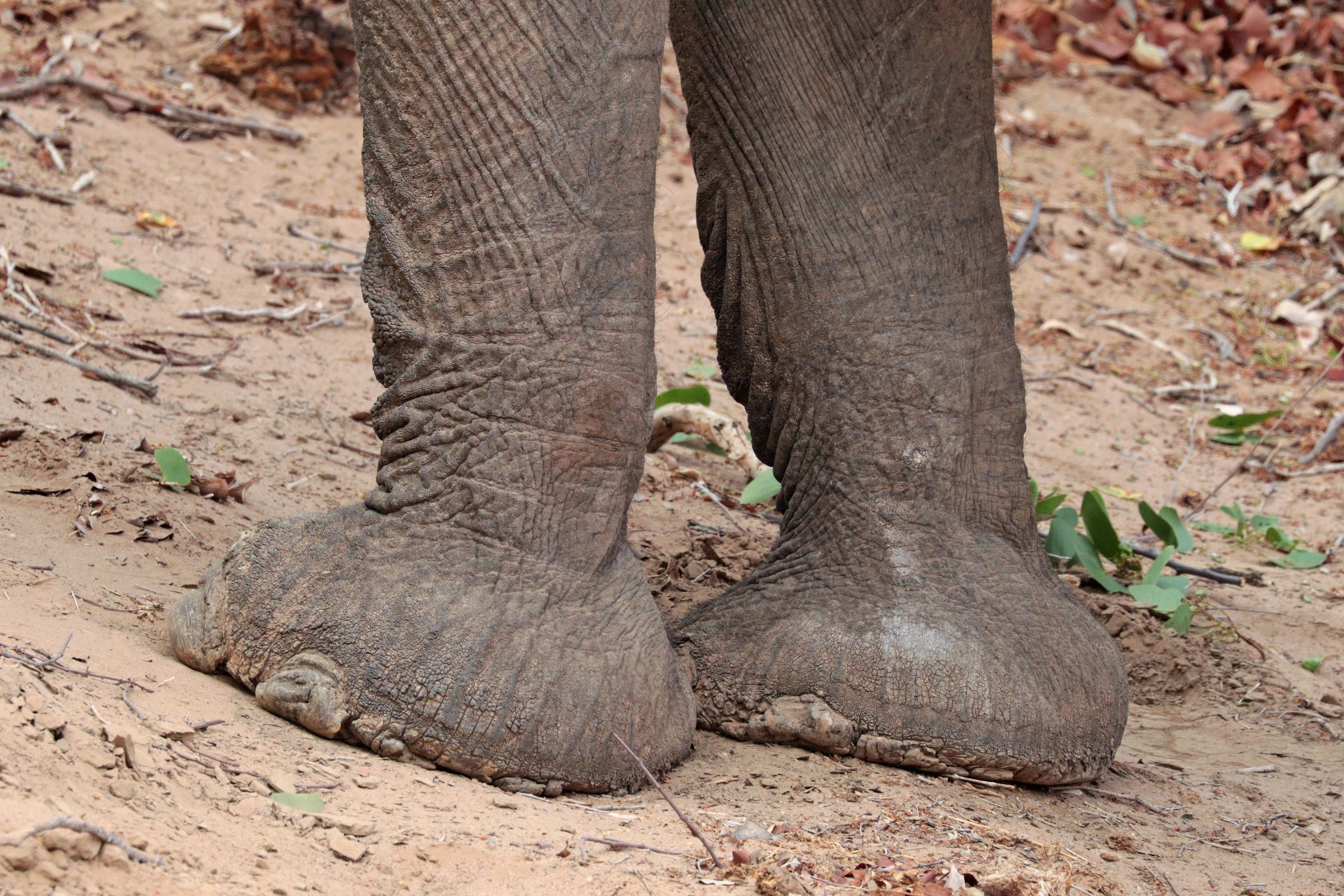
Feet

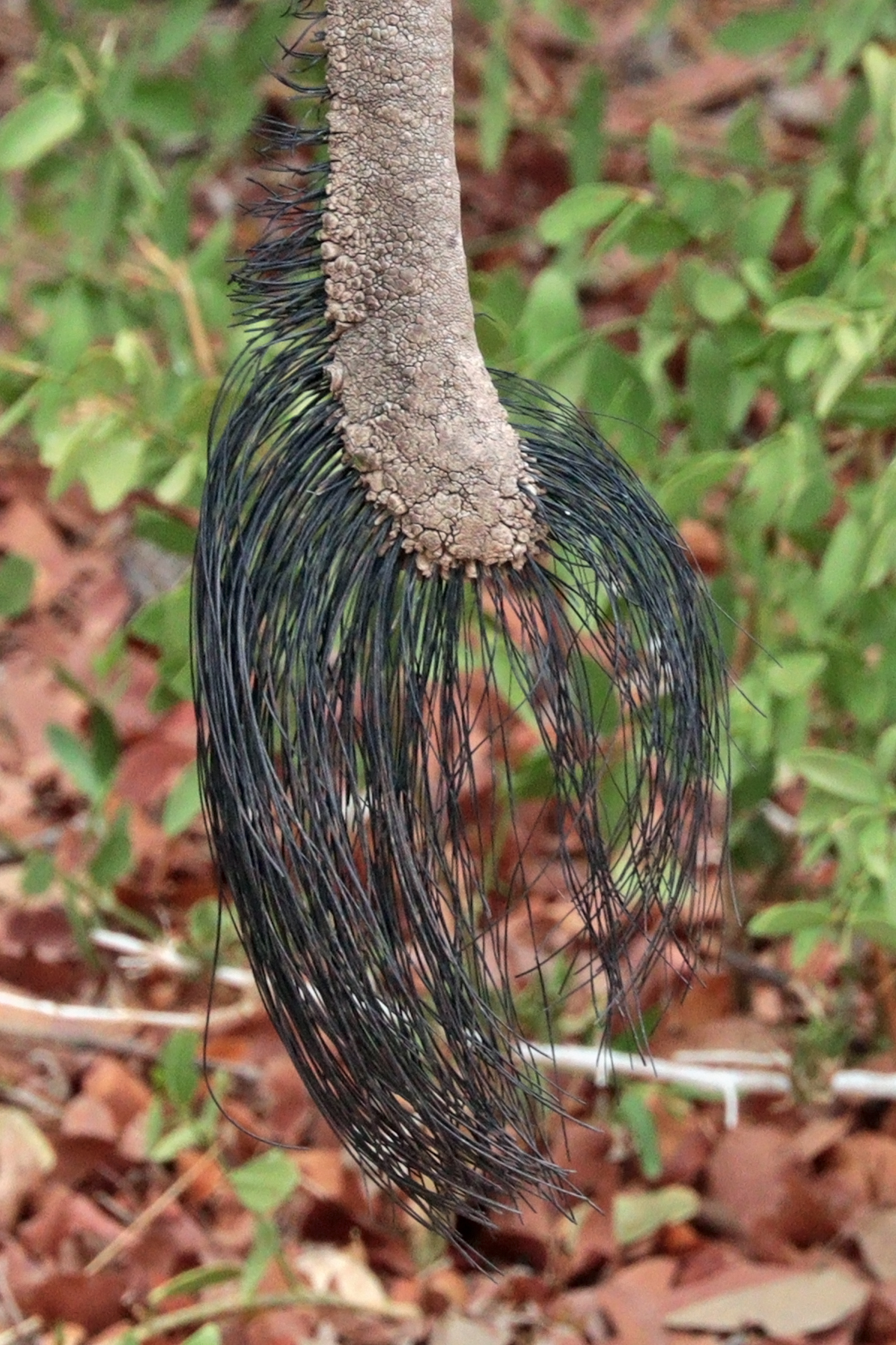
Tail

== Mali ==
Rock art found in the Sahara shows that the elephant population was widespread across much of North Africa during Neolithic times. In Mali, desert elephants are now restricted to the Gourma area, a remote region in Mali that is south of a loop made by the River Niger near Timbuktu.

These elephants are the remaining members of groups that used to inhabit large areas of the Sahel, before they were eliminated by poachers. The Malian elephant population, about 400, makes a 300-mile (480 km) migratory journey each year, walking up to 35 miles (56 km) a day. The elephants follow an anti-clockwise route that takes them past temporary and permanent water holes. They remain in the northern parts of their range until the rainy season, which is in June. They then migrate southwards, moving briefly into northern Burkina Faso before moving northwards again. Desert elephants are elusive and tend to seclude themselves among Acacia trees during the day, emerging to drink and feed at night.

The WILD Foundation and Save the Elephants are conservation charities that have been working with the Malian government to protect the elephants. Some animals were given GPS collars to track their movements and identify the corridors they traverse to complete their journey. This data is used so that their routes can be avoided when new human settlements are established.

The nomadic Touareg people who live in this region with their herds have been tolerant of the elephants. They are philosophical, stating that the elephants eat the topmost foliage of a tree, the camels browse the sides and the goats browse near the base. They know when the elephants will pass through their villages, visiting the ponds they also use for watering their herds. Now the people are living more settled lives, building huts, tending gardens, planting orchards and growing fodder grass at the edges of ponds. This created more competition between the elephants and the humans. A local initiative was set up in 1997, "Les Amis des Éléphants", which aims to inform villagers of when the elephants are expected to arrive in their area. It also encourages them to act as guides and generate income from eco-tourism.

During a prolonged drought in 1983, the Malian government brought in water for the elephants. Rainfall declined again in 2008 and the following year the adult elephants had to dig to access water deep below the surface, but the younger elephants could not reach the water with their trunks and started dying. The weakened state of the animals made it difficult for the charities to help them.

== Behavior ==
Desert elephants have developed adaptations for desert life. They have broader feet, longer legs and smaller bodies compared to other African bush elephants. Having bigger feet is useful because they may walk up to 70 kilometers at night to find water points. They are herbivorous, and their diet varies with the change of the seasons. In the wet season they prefer buds and fresh green leaves, but in the dry season they survive on drought-tolerant plants such as camel thorn (Vachellia erioloba), myrrh bushes, the mopane or turpentine tree (Colophospermum mopane), and the leaves and seedpods of the ana tree (Faidherbia albida). Adult bull elephants can eat about 250 kilograms (550 lb) of fodder a day and drink about 160 litres (35 imp gal; 42 US gal) of water, but they can go without water for up to three days at a time. They use water, mud or dust for bathing or coating their skin.

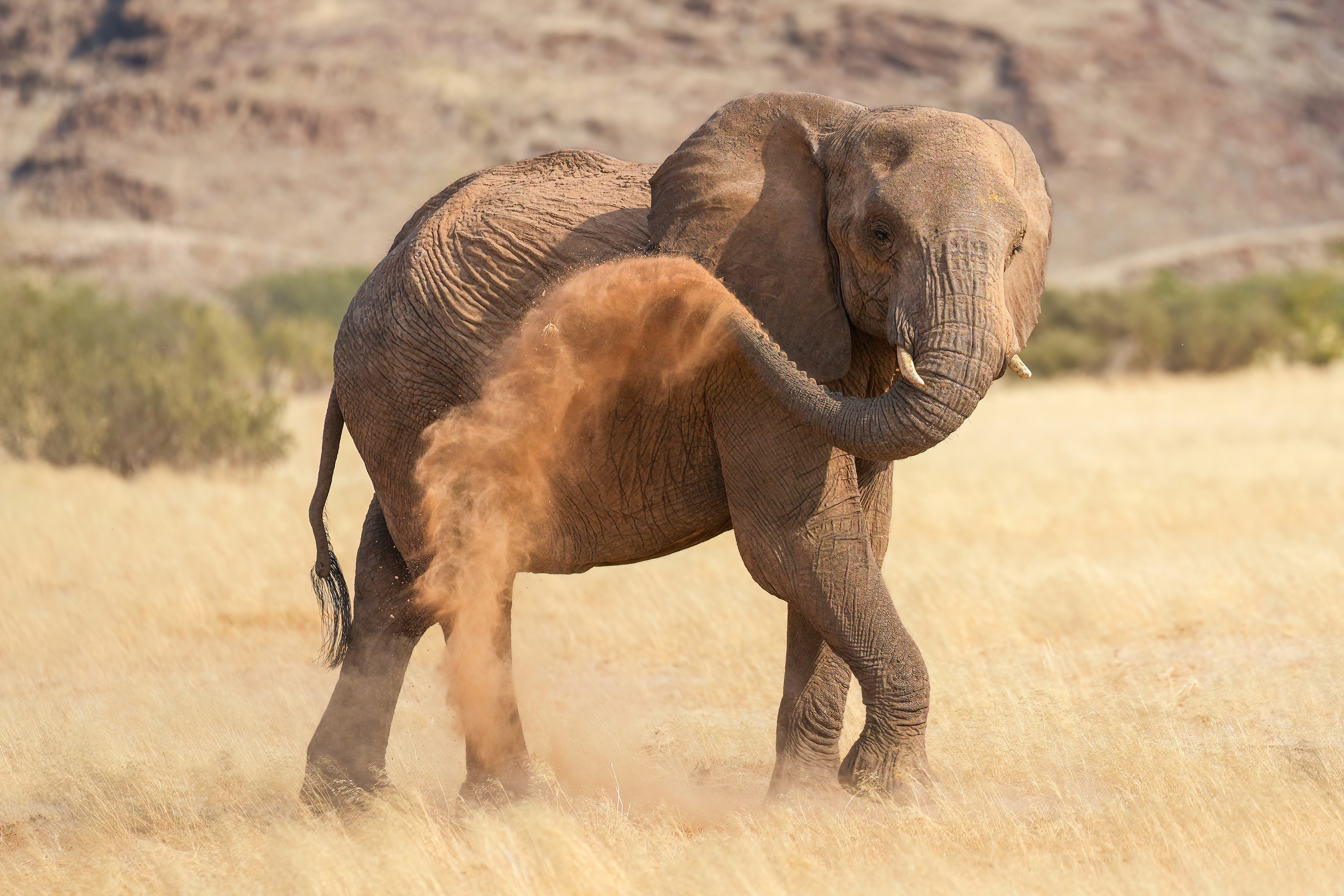

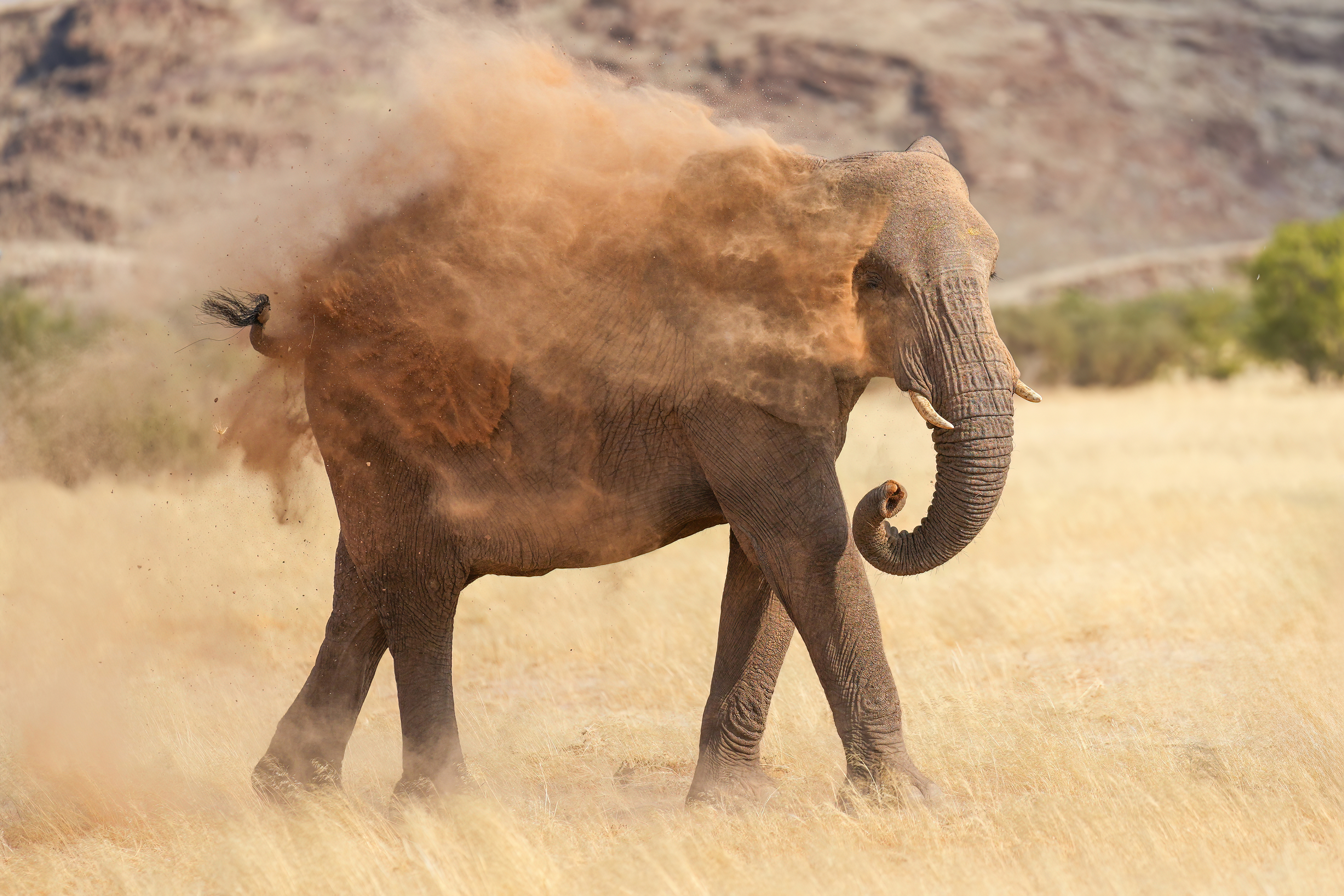
Dust bathing

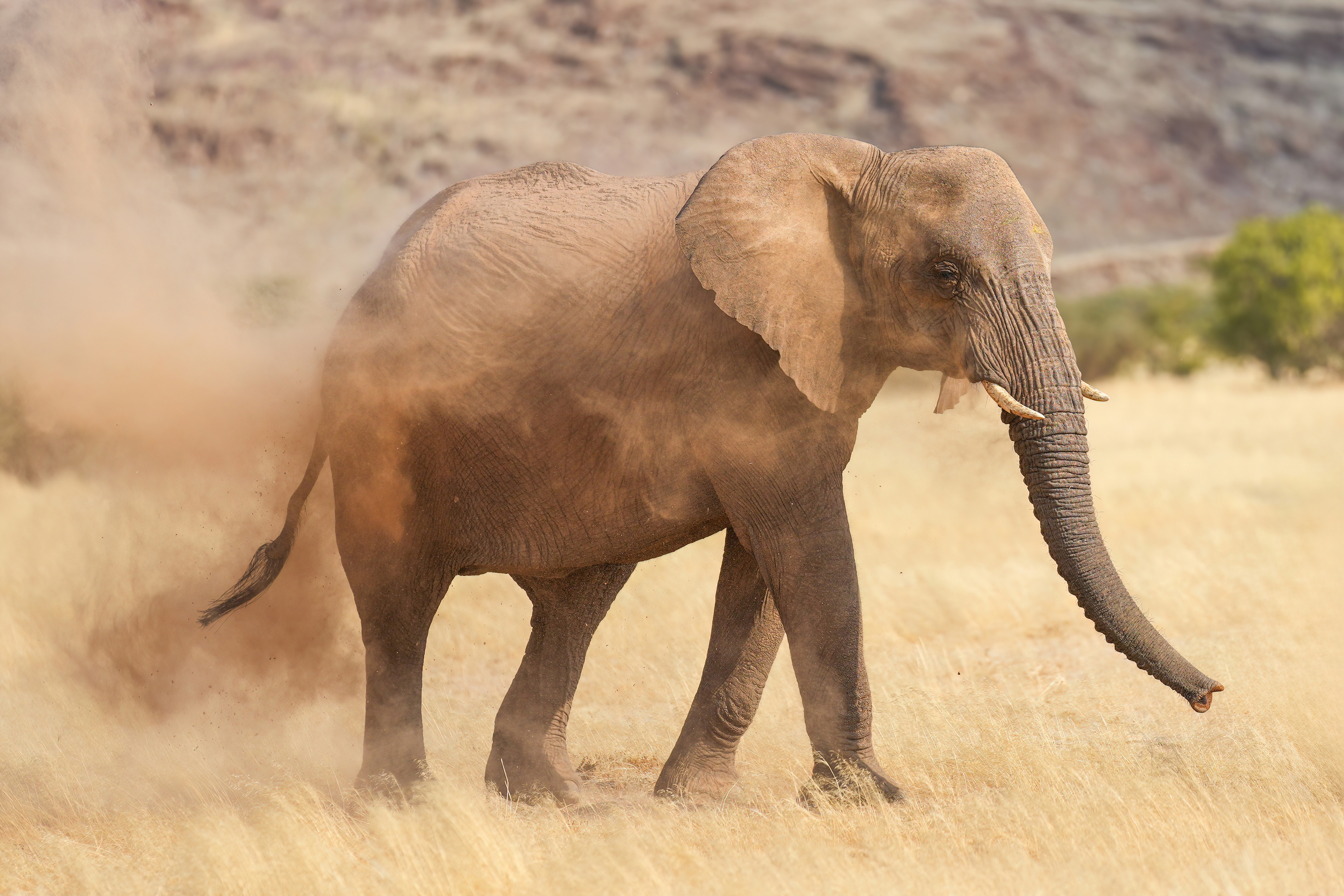
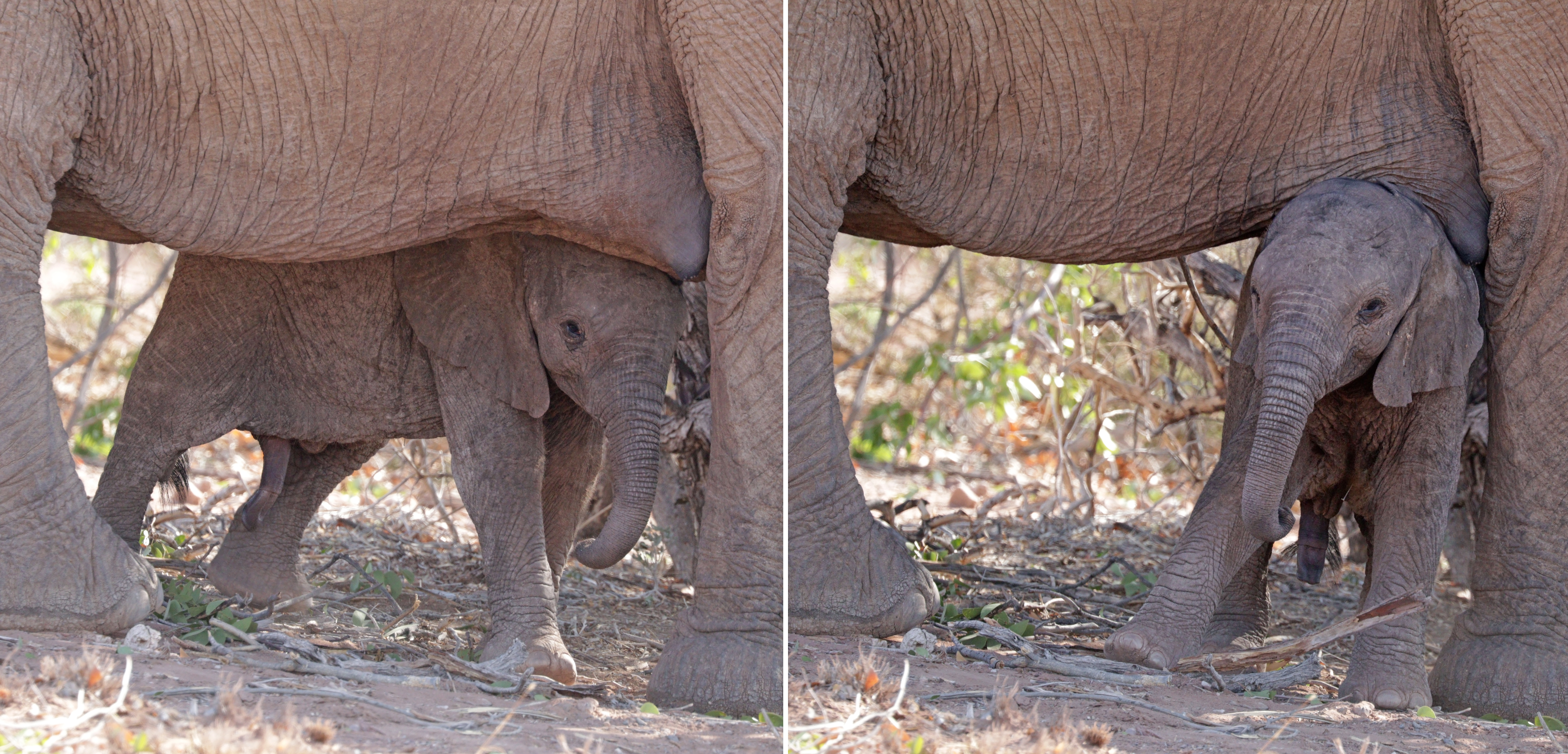
Baby male

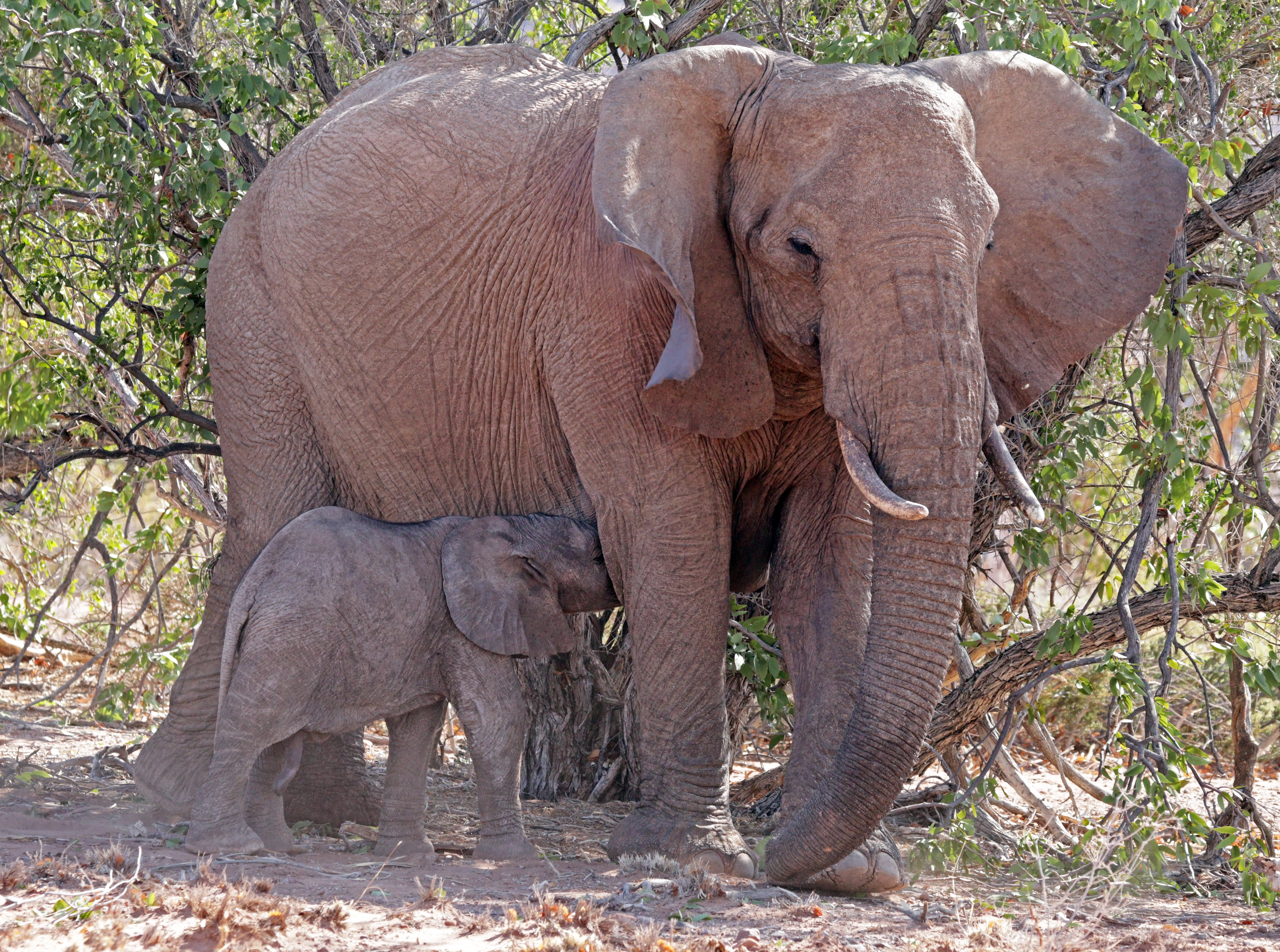
Baby male suckling

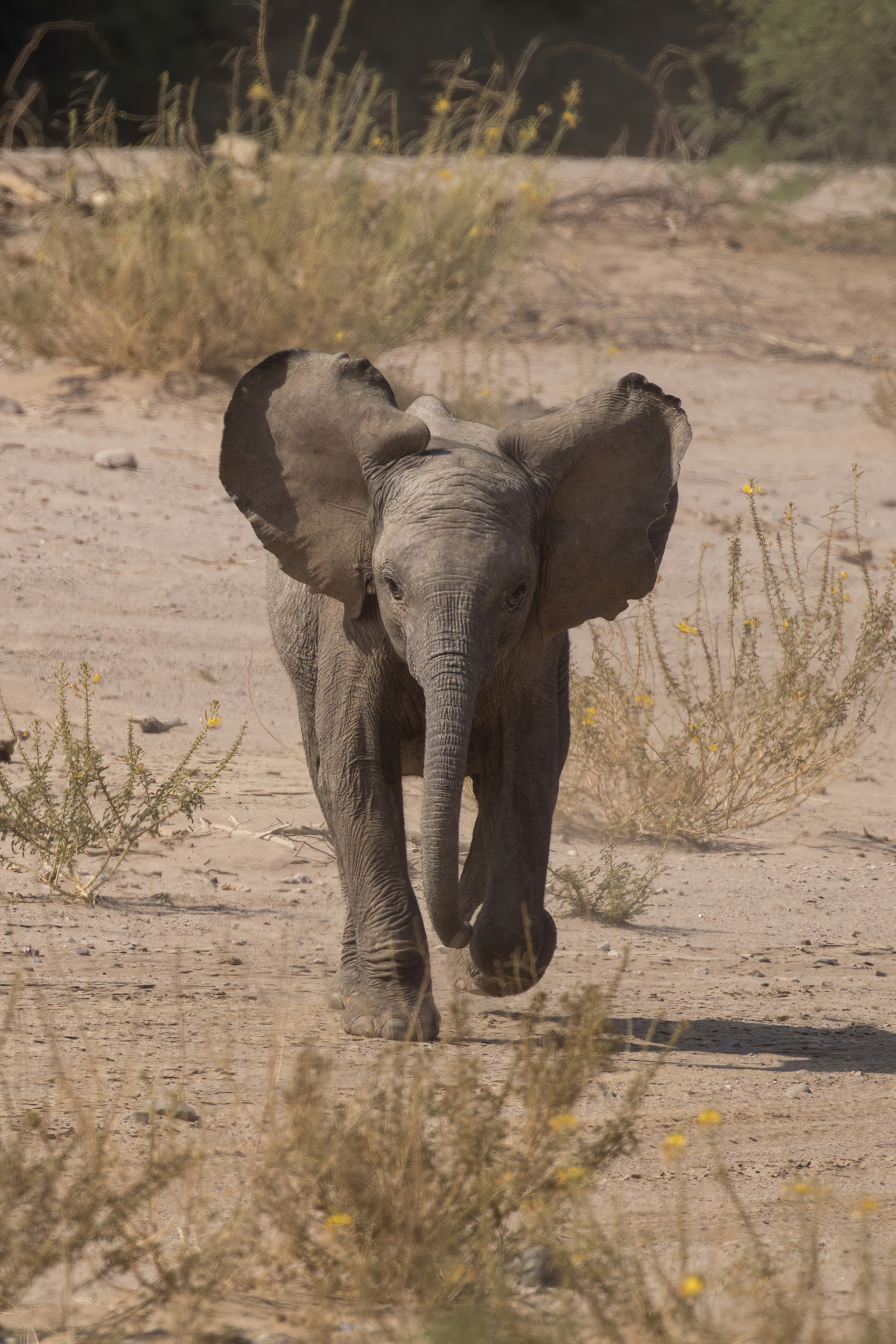
Juvenile (3 years) charging

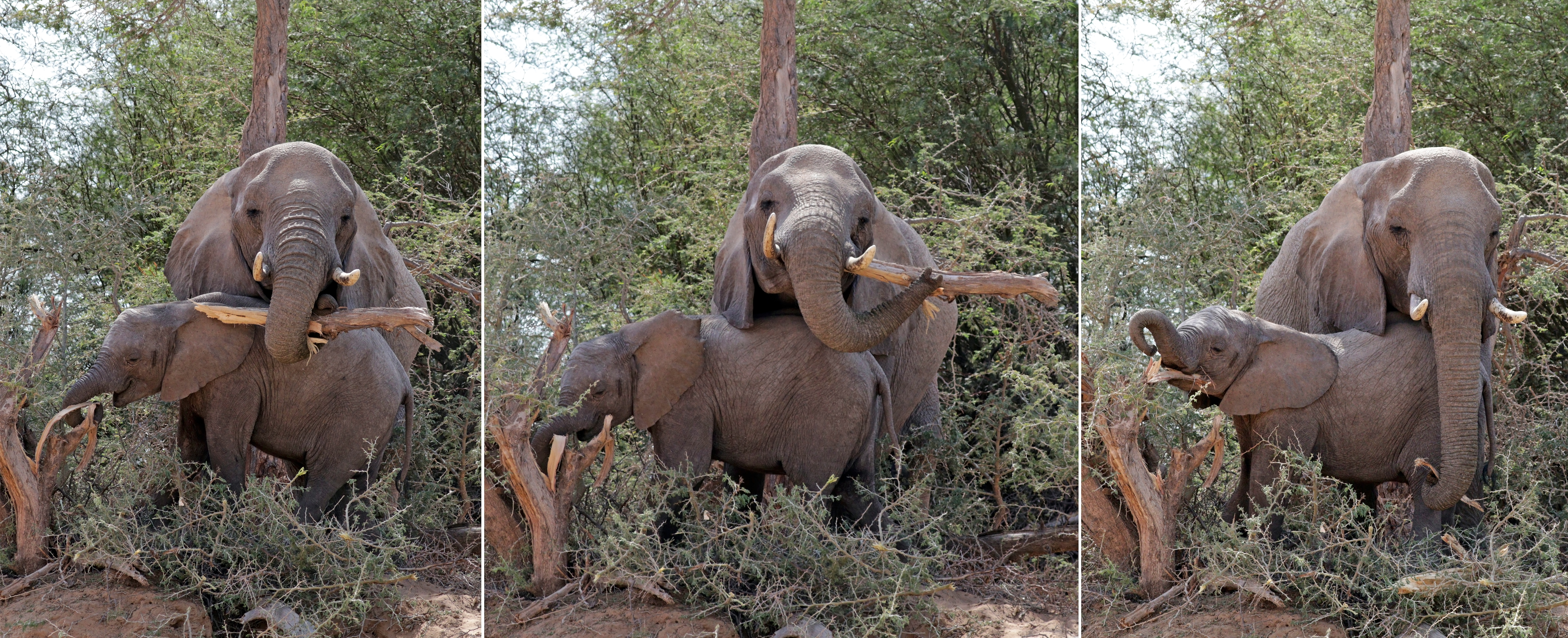
Female and juvenile feeding on bark
