= Eiseb =

- Settlement
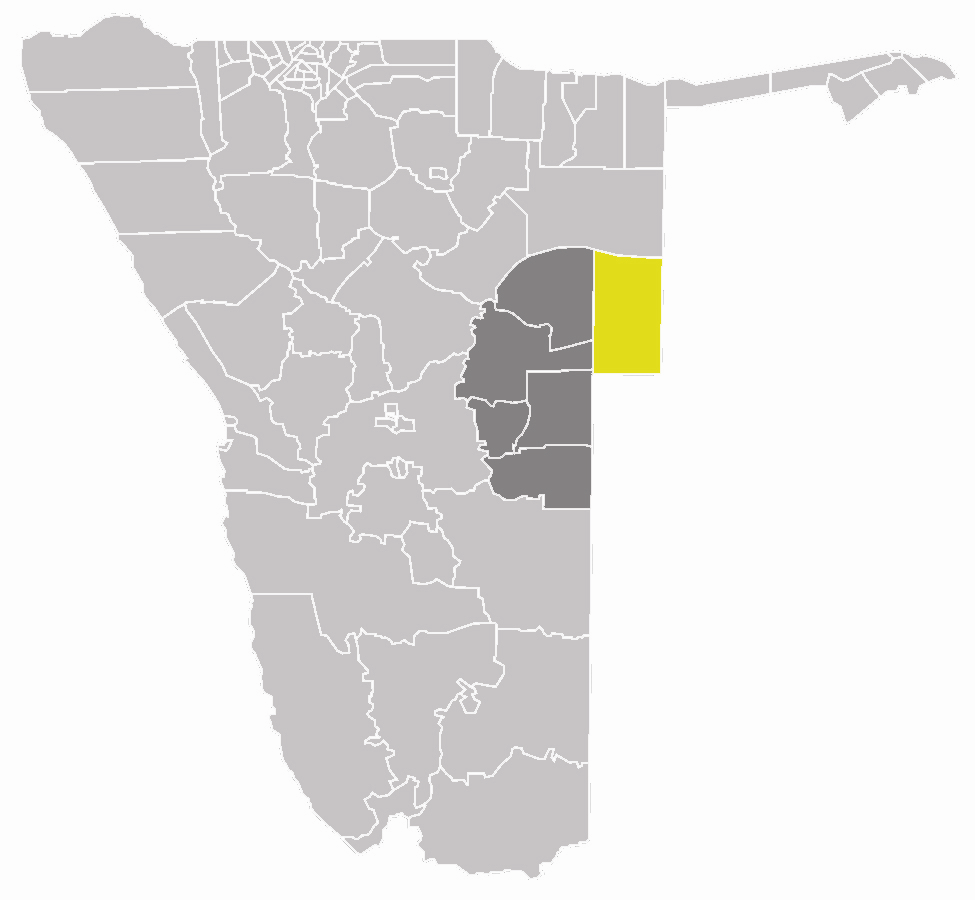
- Otjombinde Constituency (yellow) in the Omaheke Region (dark grey)
- Country: Namibia
- Region: Omaheke Region
- Constituency: Otjombinde Constituency

Population (2011)
  - Total: 2,102
- Time zone: UTC+2 (SAST)

Eiseb, also Eiseb Block, is a settlement in the Omaheke Region of Namibia. It is named after the Eiseb River, an ephemeral river (omuramba) in the Kalahari Desert. Eiseb is situated on the District road D1635 c. 350 kilometres (220 mi) northeast of Tallismanus and belongs to the Otjombinde electoral constituency.

The settlement has been established in 1992 as a place where returning Ovambanderu and Ovaherero refugees from Botswana could settle. From 1994 onwards, Ovambanderu and Ovaherero from other reserved areas, such as Epukiro, Otjinene and Otjombinde moved in and make up the majority of the inhabitants today, making a living from subsistence farming.

== Eiseb-Epukiro River Basin ==
The area between Eiseb and Epukiro is one of eleven water basins in Namibia. It has a total surface area of 10,665 square kilometres (4,118 sq mi) and borders Botswana in the east, reaches southwards until Gobabis, and covers parts of the Omaheke and Otjozondjupa Regions. The total annual water yield of the basin is 20 million cubic metres (710×10^{6} cu ft), mainly ground water.
