= Koigab River =

Coordinates: 20°29′29″S 13°16′09″E

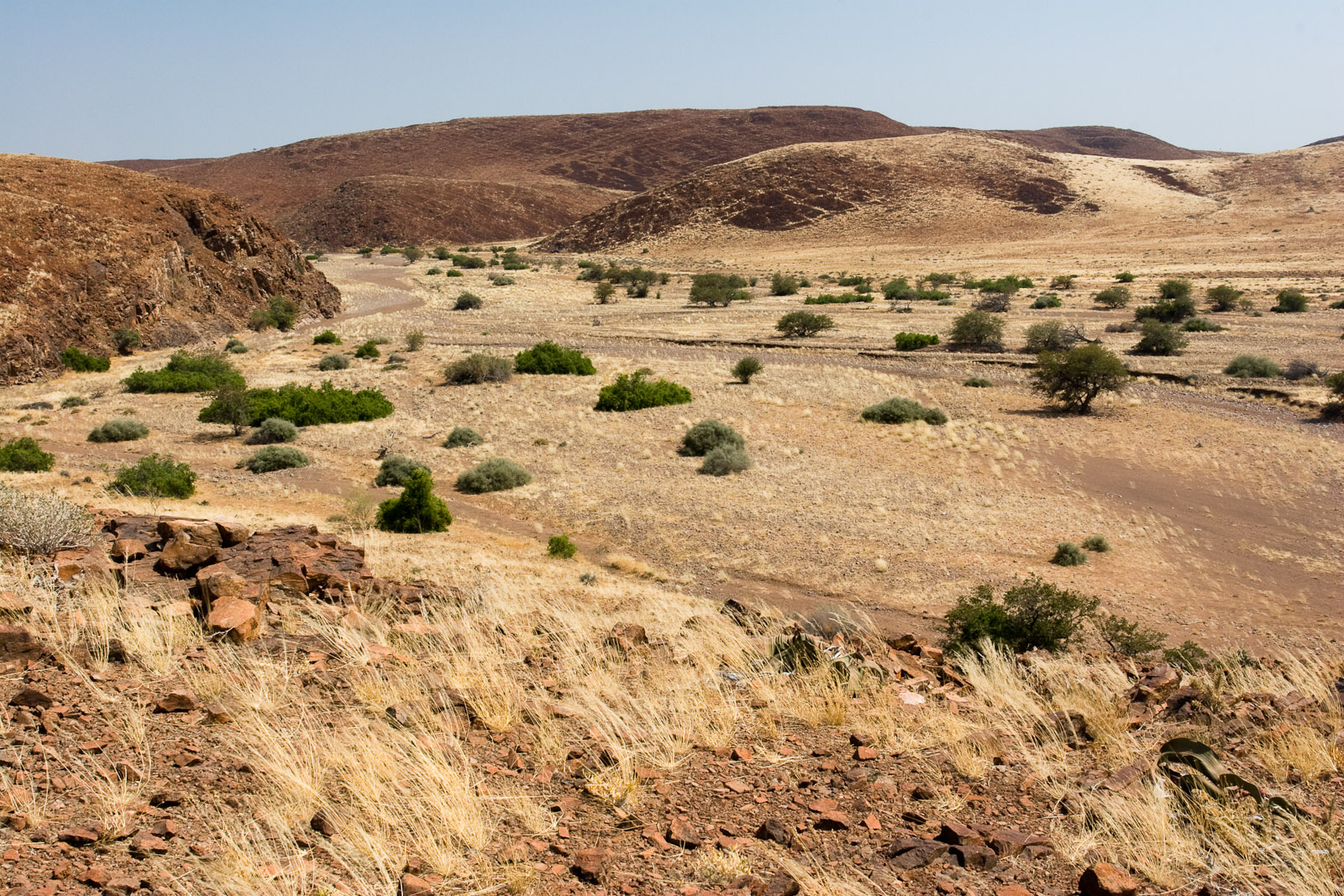

Physical characteristics
- Source: Grootberg Mountains near Bergsig
  - location: Kunene Region
- Mouth: Atlantic Ocean
  - elevation: 0 m (0 ft)
- Length: c.130 km (81 mi)
- Basin size: 2,400 km^{2} (930 sq mi)

Basin features
- Tributaries
  - left: Springbok River
  - right: Gui-Tsawisib River

The Koigab River is an ephemeral river on Namibia's Skeleton Coast. Its source is in the Grootberg Mountains near Bergsig, where its two inflows, the Gui-Tsawisib and the Springbok are located. Koigab's catchment area (including its tributaries) is estimated to be between 2,320 km^{2} (900 sq mi) and 2,400 km^{2} (930 sq mi).
