= Kaukausib =

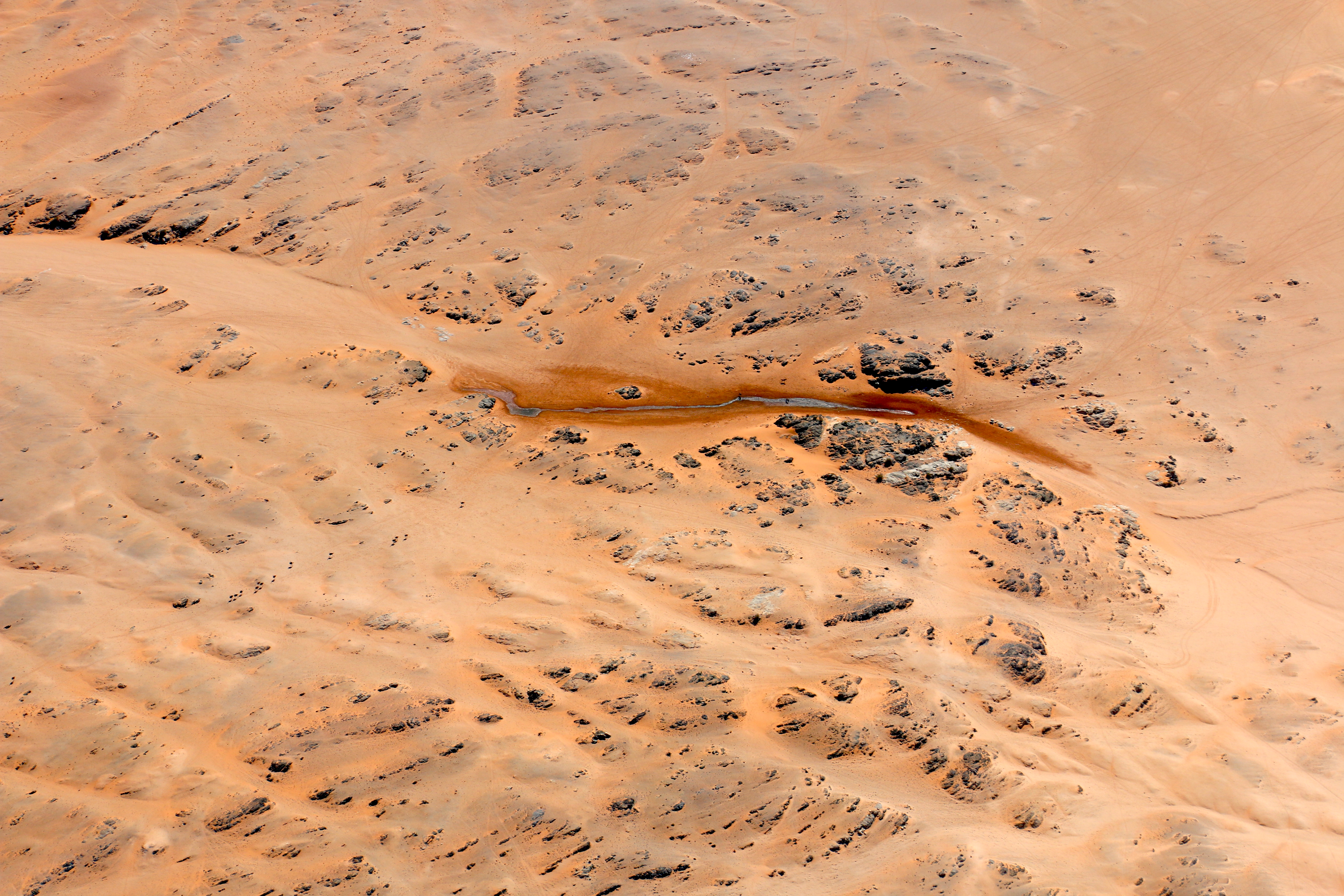
- Aerial view of Kaukausib source (2016)

Location
- Country: Namibia
- Region: Karas

Physical characteristics
- Source
  - location: Kaukausus source
  - coordinates: 26°59′15″S 15°38′58″E

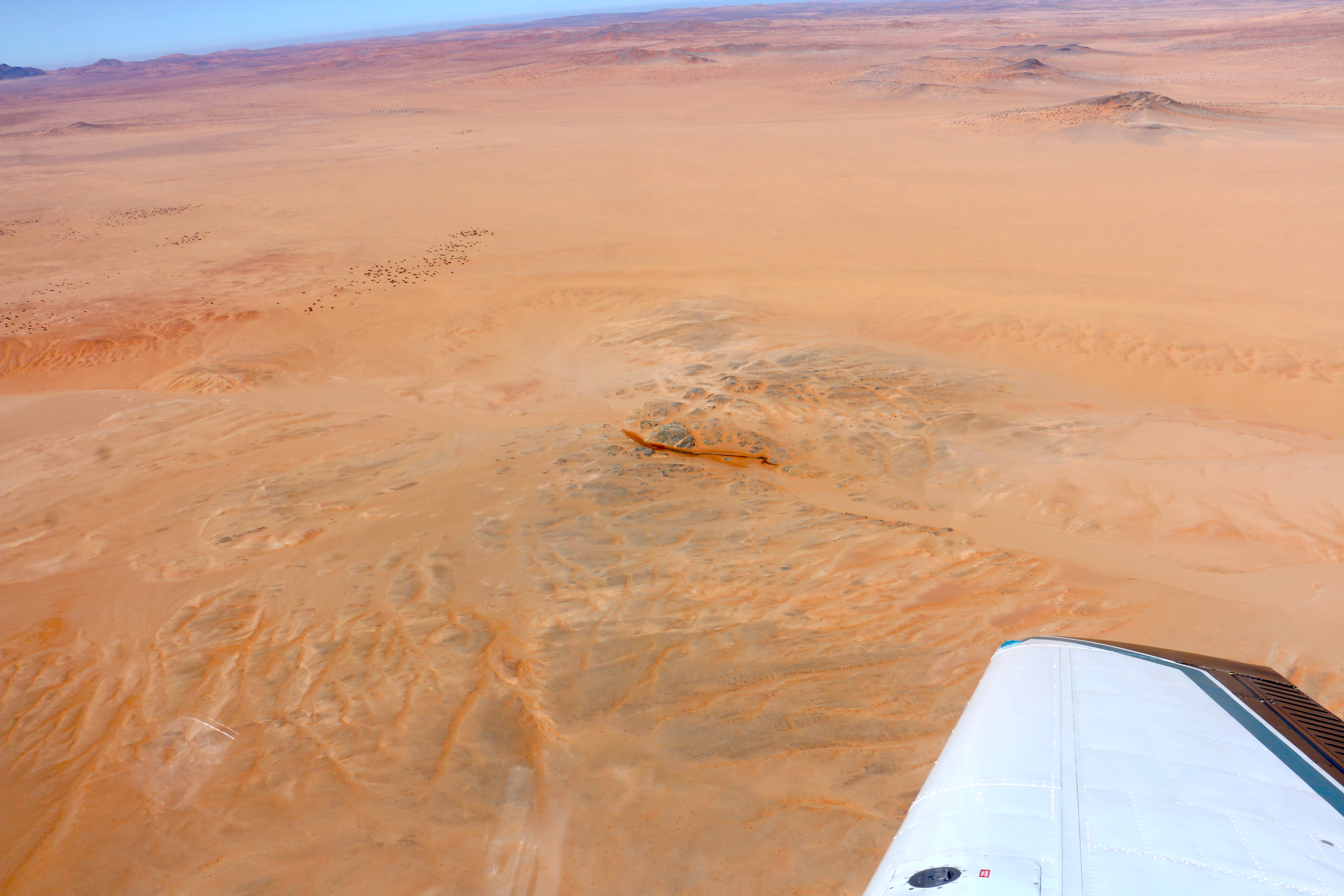
Aerial view over Kaukausib spring in the Diamond Restricted Area

Kaukausib-River in German called Kaukausib-Mulde is a rivier (dry river) within the Diamond Restricted Area also called Sperrgebiet in the south of Namibia. The Kaukausib-Rivier extends through the Namib from south to north-north-west. It ends in the Namib Desert without reaching the Atlantic, or any other river. At the upper end of the Kaukausib Rivier there is a spring, which carries water throughout the whole year and is a drinking trough for various animals, especially for Oryx and Ostrich. The Kaukausib-spring is located 62 km southeast of Lüderitz and 40 km east of the Atlantic coast on 375 m above sea level (1235 ft).

In early days, on the march from Lüderitzbucht to Aus oxen were watered at the Kaukausib-well. The Germans write:

... und bald darauf war die Wasserstelle Kaukausib erfüllt von Lärm und Staub, von Gestampf und Ochsengebrüll.

— Meno Holst, Lüderitz erkämpft Südwest S.118 (1941)

In English it means:

... and soon the watering place Kaukausib was filled with noise and dust, with stamping and oxen bellowing.

— Meno Holst, Lüderitz erkämpft Südwest Page:118 (1941)

The book Diamonds in the Desert describes, how August Stauch established a company in the beginning of the 20th century called Kaukausibtal Diamantengesellschaft.

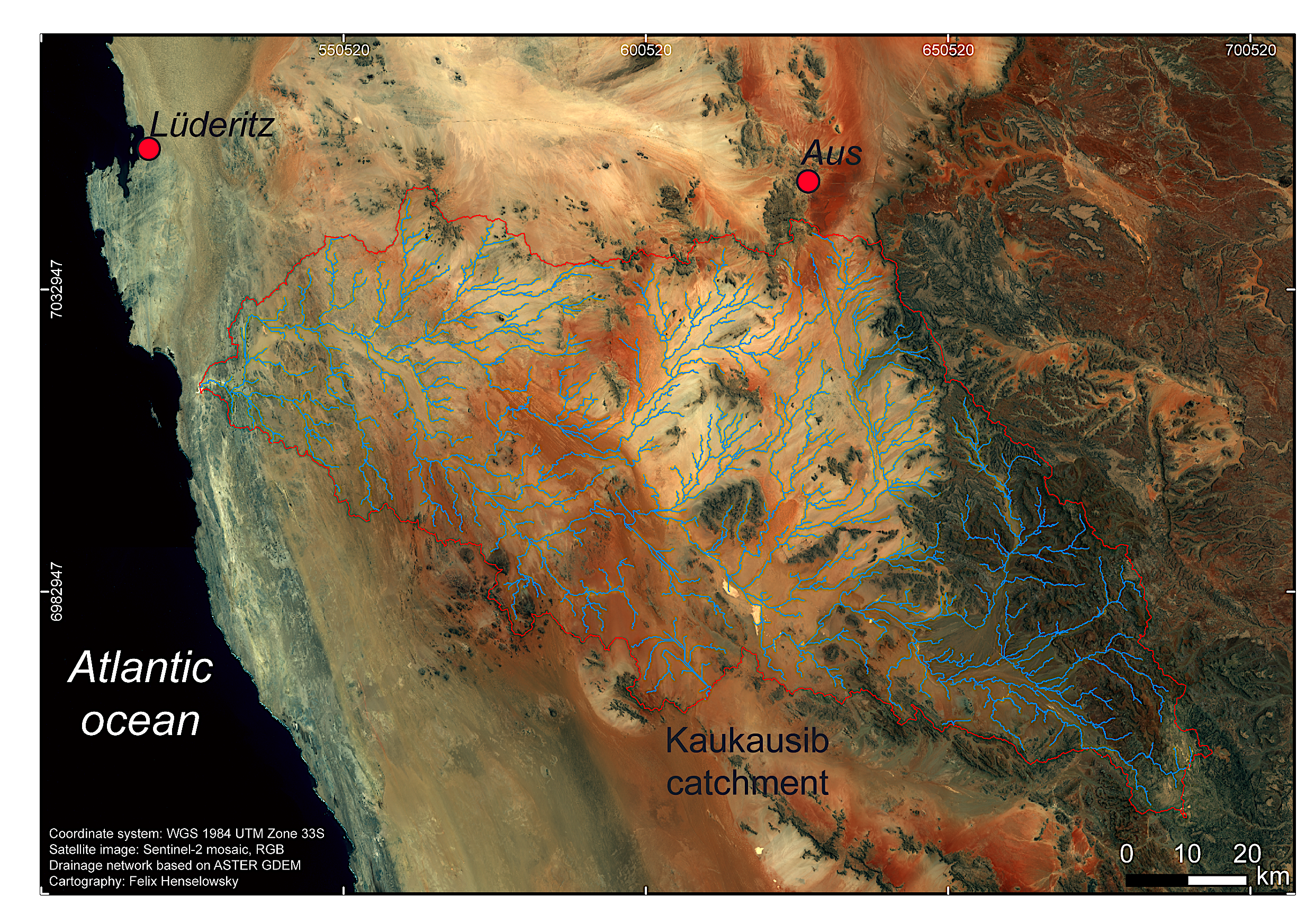
Kaukausib catchment

== Pictures ==
Pictures of Kaukausib
