= Tsondab River =

River in central Namibia

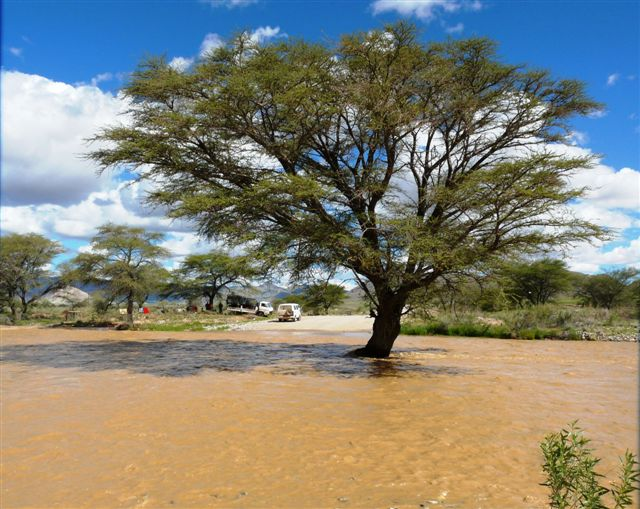

Physical characteristics
- Source: Remhoogte Mountains
  - location: Hardap Region
- Mouth: Tsondabvlei
  - location: Hardap Region
  - coordinates: 23°55′13″S 15°22′11″E
- Length: c.150 km (93 mi)
- Basin size: 3,500 km^{2} (1,400 sq mi)

Basin features
- Tributaries
  - left: Diep River
  - right: Noab River, Koireb River

The Tsondab River is an ephemeral river in the Hardap Region of central Namibia. Its source is in the Remhoogte Mountains. From there it flows westwards through the Namib-Naukluft National Park before evaporating at Tsondabvlei. Inflows of the Tsondab are Diep, Noab and Koireb. Tsondab's catchment area (including its tributaries) is 3,500 km^{2} (1,400 sq mi).
