= Hoanib =

Ephemeral seasonal river in Namibia

Coordinates: 19°23′S 13°06′E

Hoanib River
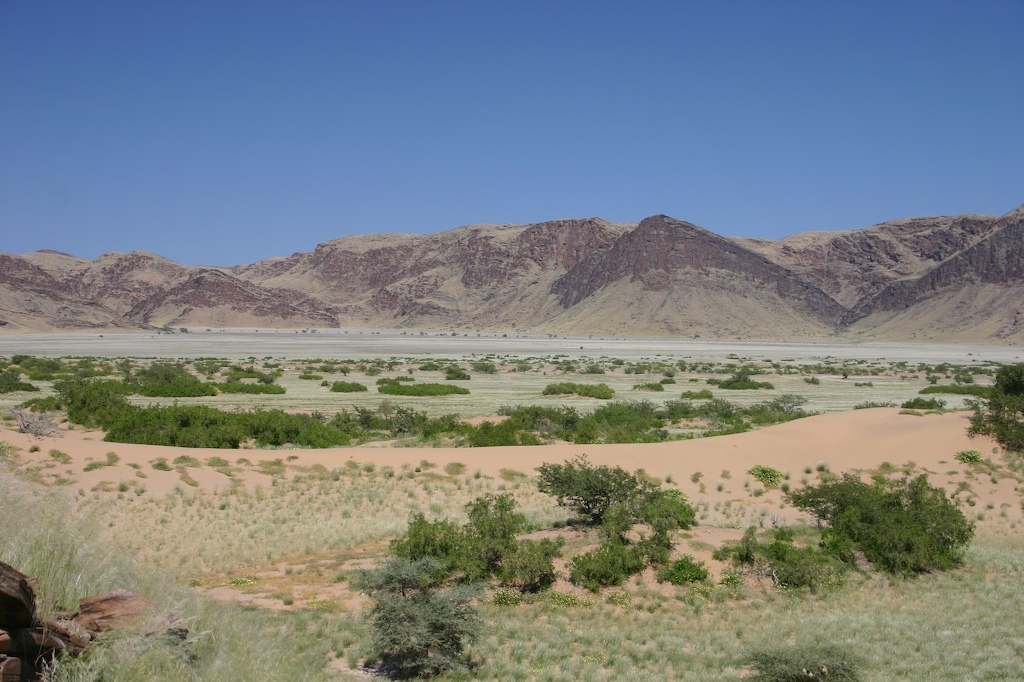
- Hoanib floodplain

Physical characteristics
- Source
  - location: Kunene Region
- Mouth: Atlantic Ocean
  - elevation: 0 m (0 ft)
- Length: c.270 km (170 mi)
- Basin size: c.17,200 km^{2} (6,600 sq mi)

Basin features
- Tributaries
  - left: Ombonde River, Mudorib River
  - right: Aap River, Otjitaimo River, Ganamub River, Tsuchub River

The Hoanib is one of the 12 ephemeral seasonal rivers in the west of Namibia, where it used to be the border between northern Damaraland and Kaokoland. Its length is 27 kilometres (17 mi). With the low population density in the area, the oasis character of the river valley and the relatively high wildlife population of the Hoanib, like in the case of the Hoarusib, its valley is one of the last true wilderness areas in Namibia. One of the last settlements of desert elephants, it is characterised by strong wind and water eroded, weathered stone deposits (up to 10 m height). Inflows of Hoanib are Aap River, Otjitaimo River, Ombonde, Ganamub, Mudorib and Tsuxub.

== Hydrology ==
The Hoanib's catchment area (including its tributaries) is estimated to be between 15,760 km^{2} (6,080 sq mi) and 17,200 km^{2} (6,600 sq mi). It extends from the west coast to Ojiovasando and the Black Peaks of the interior. It also includes the resource-rich region Sesfontein, Warmquelle and the Khowarib Gorge. The highest point of the watershed is at 1,800 metres (5,900 ft). The rainfall in the catchment area is sporadic and varies from zero in the west to 325 millimetres (12.8 in) per year in the northeast. The proportion of area with less than 100 millimetres (3.9 in) per year is 71 percent. In only 12 percent of the catchment area is the annual rainfall over 300 millimetres (12 in) per year. The Hoanib flows only every few years from heavy rainfall in the hinterland of the catchment area, but then the flood wave can be several meters high and may last for several days. Not always, but more often in recent years, the water reaches the mouth in the Atlantic. A large part of the water seeps into and contributes to a large dense subsurface aquifer from the exits at various points in the river bed, so that even in dry years there is groundwater. Surrounding groundwater forms efflorescence used by many antelope as salt licks. During dry periods the Hoanib desert elephant dig deep holes to reach the near-surface groundwater.

== Flora and vegetation ==
The vegetation of the catchment comprises mainly Mopane savanna (87%) and the northern Namib, at 13%. Some larger collections of Ana trees (Faidherbia albida), Leadwood (Combretum imberbe), Mopane (Colophospermum mopane), Camel Thorn (Acacia erioloba), Salvadora and Euclea are found in the gallery forests. Often several meters high, sour grasses and reeds grow in the wetlands.

With its gallery forests and the larger wetlands in the Khowarib gorge, in a flood area east of Sesfontein and the lower reaches and mouth area, the Hoanib is a linear oasis in the otherwise arid surroundings, providing livelihood for a rich wildlife. In addition to larger populations of many species of antelope found in the lower reaches of the Hoanib, are also a large number of desert elephants (about 35 individuals), rhinos, giraffes, as well as several lion prides, and smaller predators.

== Use and settlement ==
91% of the catchment area is on Communal Land in tribal government; 3% is on privately owned land over 12 farms and 6% is in the range of the Skeleton Coast National Park. The population is estimated at around 9200. Settlement centers are Sesfontein and Warmquelle and Otjivasando. The land use is predominantly pastoral. Individual and adventure tourism is becoming important there. West of Sesfontein, the Hoanib Valley belongs to the concession area of Desert Adventure Safaris. The increasing tourism, but also the grazing pressure of the local population and the greed of mining pose a growing threat to this unique ecosystem.

== Notes ==
- Klaus Hüser, Helga Besler, Wolf Dieter Blümel, Klaus Heine, Hartmut Leser, Uwe Rust: Namibia – Eine Landschaftskunde in Bildern. Klaus Hess, Göttingen/Windhoek 2001, ISBN 978-3-933117-14-4
- Julian Thomas Fennessy: The ecology of desert-dwelling giraffe (Giraffa camelopardalis angolensis) in northwestern Namibia. Diss., Sydney 2004
