= Omuramba =

Ancient river-beds found in the Kalahari Desert

Coordinates: 18.87°S 21.64°E

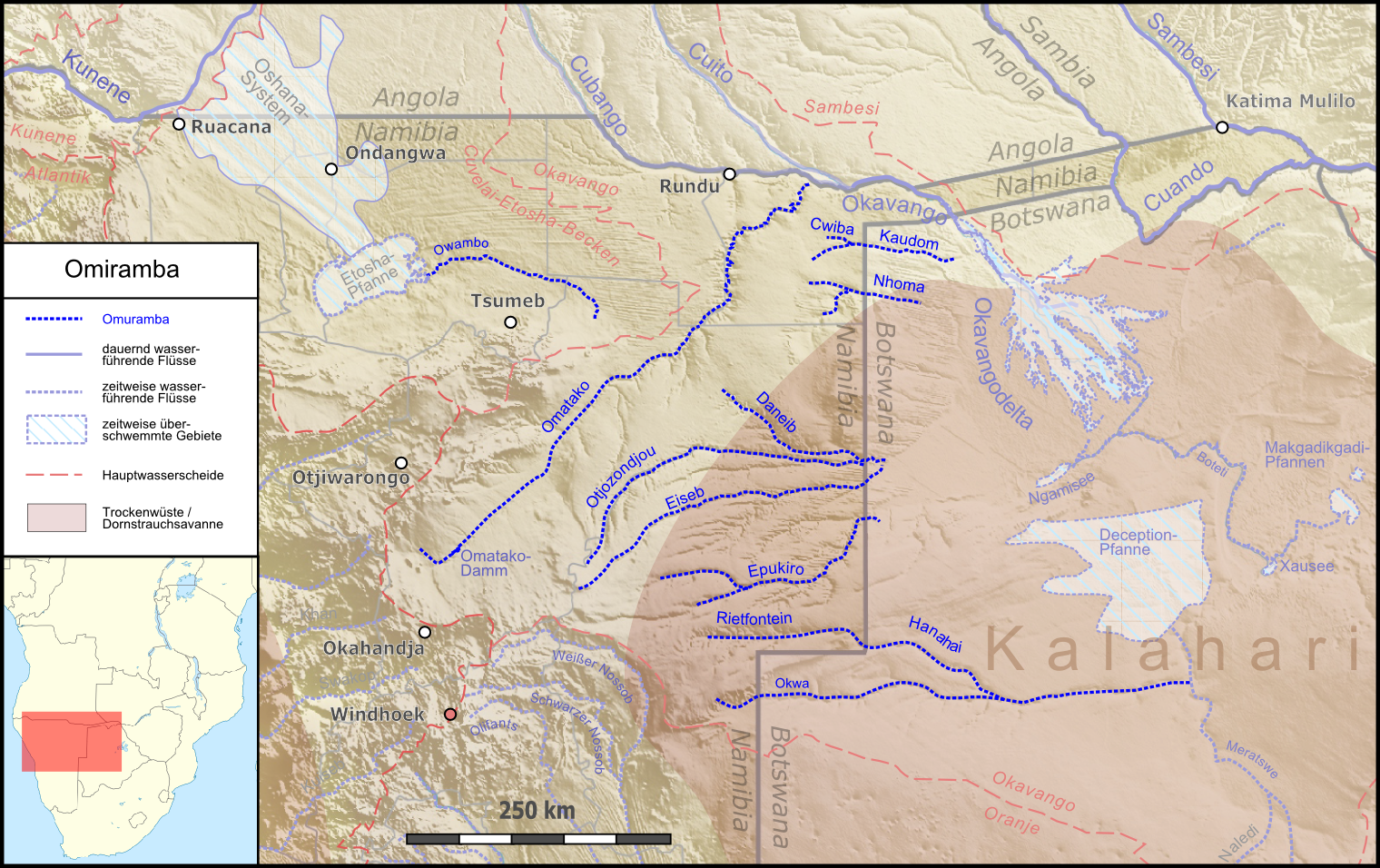
Location of omiramba in the border area of Namibia and Botswana.

Omuramba (plural: Omiramba) is the term for ancient river-beds found in the Kalahari Desert of Africa, notably in the North Eastern part of Namibia and North Western part of Botswana. The word is taken from the Herero language. An omuramba provides occasional standing pools of water and more fertility than in the surrounding sand plains. Some specific omiramba are named: Eiseb, Rietfontein, Epukiro, Omatako. They mostly start in the central parts of Namibia and run into the central parts of Botswana.

== Description ==
The depth and width of the beds varies, with some being 3 to 4 km wide. Omiramba that were perennial rivers about 16,000 years ago now flow only for short distances, and only after heavy rains.

== History ==
Omiramba have historically been sites for battles which were fought along their winding courses, notably the Herero-German war in 1904, which ended in a terrible genocide that killed nearly 70 percent of the Herero population and saw many others flee down the courses of omiramba, which were then in the dry season and inhospitable. The omiramba were also home to the San people in pre-colonial times.

== Threats ==
Today, the omiramba are one of many natural water resources being used for agriculture and drinking water by not only the historical nomadic population, but a new and growing sedentary population practicing permanent agriculture. Studies have highlighted concerns about the possible unsustainable use of water in the region.
