= Huab River =

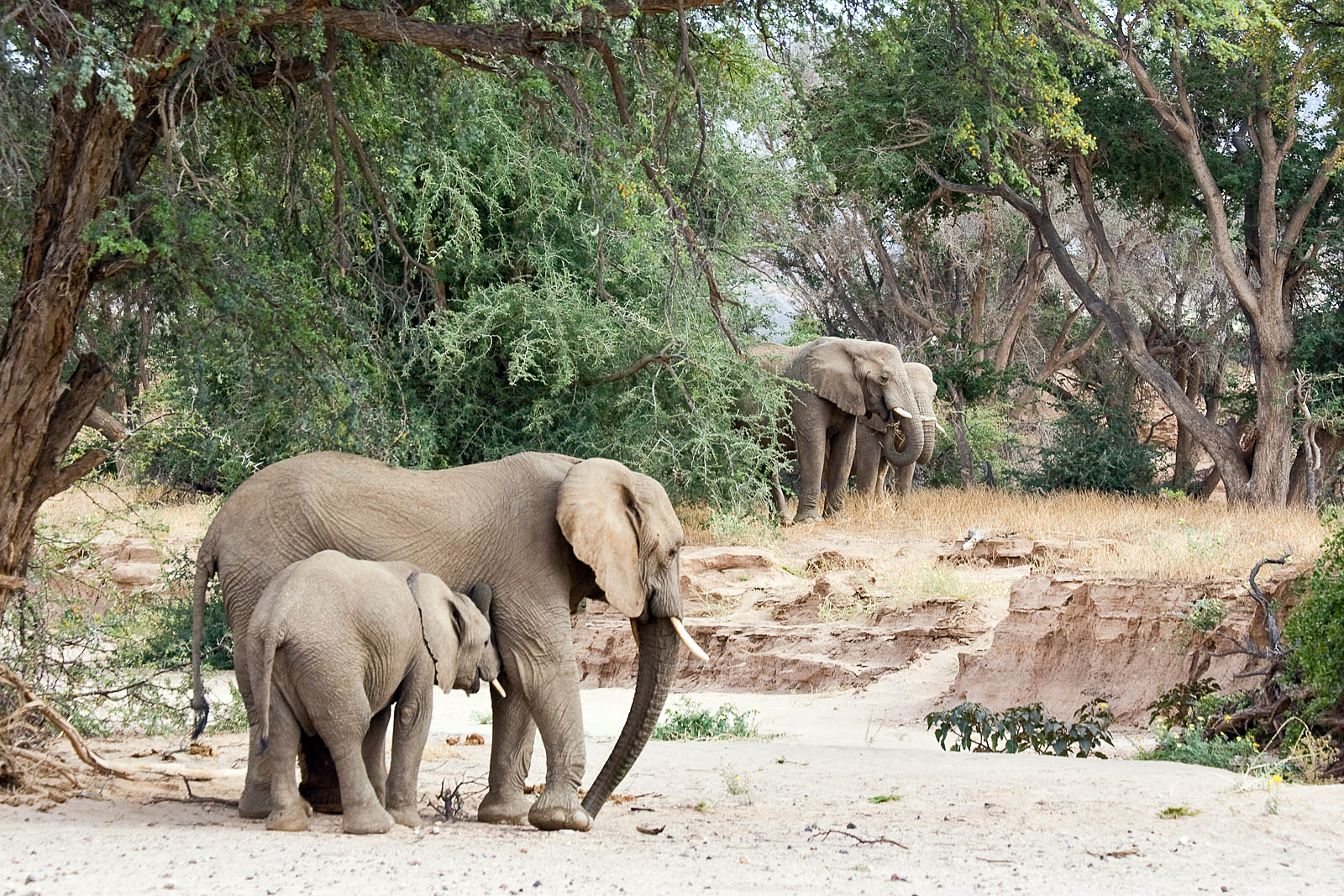

Physical characteristics
- Source: southeast of Kamanjab
  - location: Kunene Region
- Mouth: Atlantic Ocean
  - coordinates: 20°55′04″S 13°27′24″E
  - elevation: 0 m (0 ft)
- Length: c.300 km (190 mi)
- Basin size: 14,800 km^{2} (5,700 sq mi)

Basin features
- Tributaries
  - left: Klein Omaruru River, Sout River, Aba Huab River
  - right: Ongwati River, Klip River

The Huab River is an ephemeral river in the Kunene Region of north-western Namibia. Its source is southeast of Kamanjab, from where it flows westwards through Mopane savanna until it reaches the Skeleton Coast and the Atlantic Ocean. Inflows of the Huab are Klein-Omaruru, Sout, Aba-Huab, Ongwati and Klip. Huab's catchment area (including its tributaries) is estimated to be between 14,800 km^{2} (5,700 sq mi) and 16,465 km^{2} (6,357 sq mi), and includes the town of Khorixas as well as the settlements Kamanjab, Fransfontein, and Anker. The Twyfelfontein World Heritage Site is located on the banks of the Aba Huab.

The Huab is well known for its Desert elephant population which endangers farming activities but is also a potential tourist attraction.
