= Oshigambo River =

River in Namibia

Coordinates: 17.7833°S 16.0667°E

The Oshigambo River is an ephemeral river in central northern Namibia, flowing into Etosha Pan. It almost never carries surface water but flowed and broke its banks in 2006, flooding Oshigambo, a village it cuts through. Students at the Oshigambo High School were affected by the 2011 flood. The bridge connecting the female hostel to the school was under water due to the heavy rains. The flooding claimed several lives during the past few years.
