= Khumib River =

Coordinates: 22°42′S 14°54′E

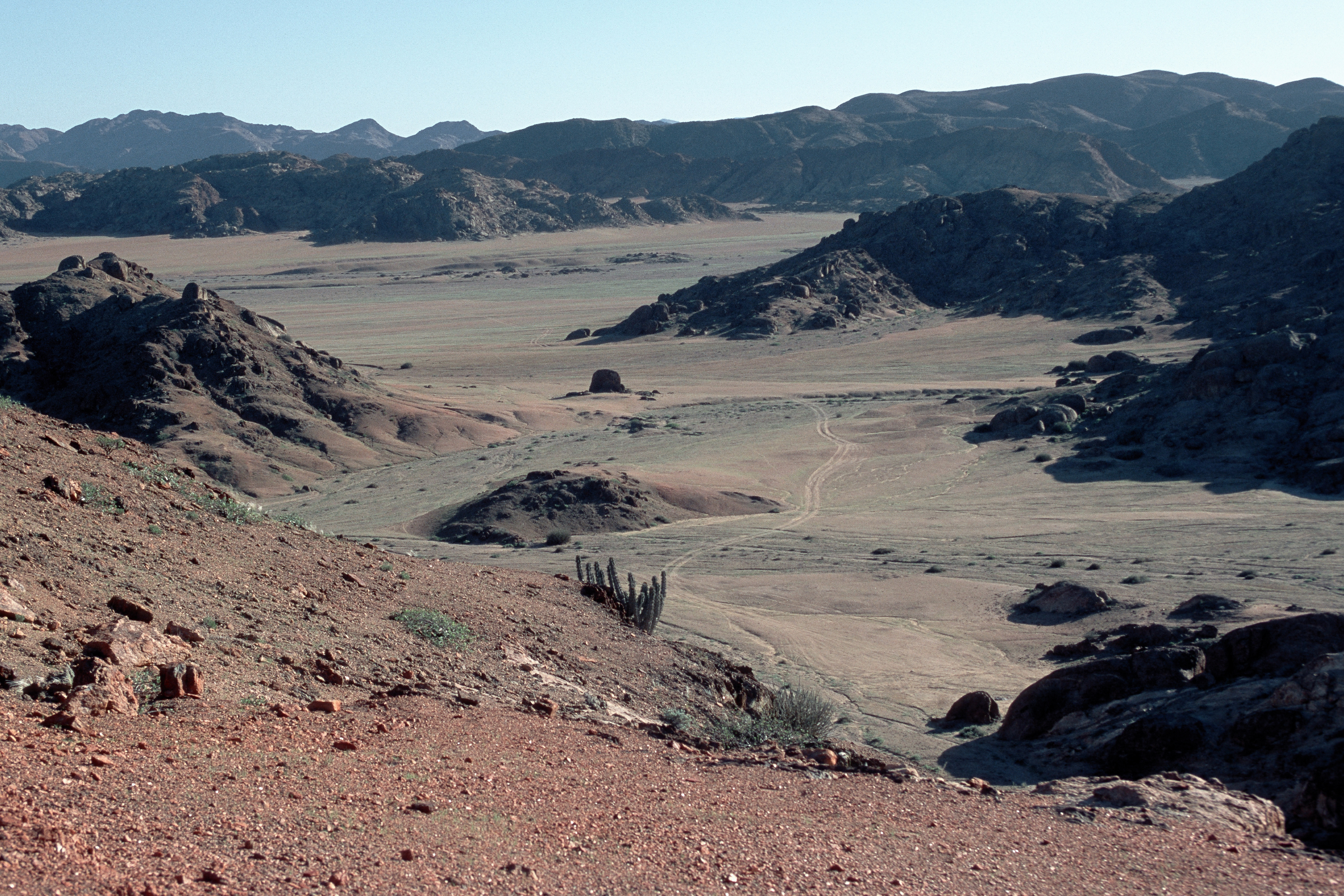

Physical characteristics
- Source: near Orupembe
  - location: Kunene Region
  - elevation: 1,542 m (5,059 ft)
- Mouth: Atlantic Ocean
  - elevation: 0 m (0 ft)
- Length: c.80 km (50 mi)
- Basin size: c.2,300 km^{2} (890 sq mi)

The river Khumib is an ephemeral river crossing the Kunene Region of north-western Namibia. It occasionally carries surface water during the rainy seasons in November and February/March. Its catchment area is estimated between 2,200 km^{2} (850 sq mi) and 2,300 km^{2} (890 sq mi).

The Khumib has its origin near the settlement of Orupembe in the remote north-west of Kunene. From there the river course passes westwards to the Skeleton Coast and drains into the Namib Desert. It only occasionally discharges into the Atlantic Ocean.
