= Hoarusib River =

Physical characteristics
- Source: near Opuwo
  - location: Kunene Region
- Mouth: Atlantic Ocean
  - coordinates: 18.9744112°S 12.5604578°E
  - elevation: 0 m (0 ft)
- Length: c.300 km (190 mi)
- Basin size: 15,237 km^{2} (5,883 sq mi)

The Hoarusib River is an ephemeral river in the Kunene Region of north-western Namibia. Its source is near the regional capital Opuwo, and the river flows through the Tonnesen and Giraffe Mountains into the Atlantic Ocean. The Hoarusib occasionally carries surface water during the rainy season from November to February/March. The catchment area of the Hoarusib is 15,237 km^{2} (5,883 sq mi).

The name Hoarusib is thought to have originated from the geology of this stretch as the Nama word "!naruseb" means "water which twists and turns through a narrow gorge." It is known for its steep canyon walls of black and red volcanic rock, and the strange makalani palms which grows from the pips washed down from upstream. Also found near the banks are "clay castle" formations created by the gradual deposition and erosion of clay.
