= Battle of Calueque =

1988 battle of the South African Border War in south-west Angola

- Part of the Angolan Civil War and the South African Border War
- Battle of Calueque (Angola)
Date	16 May 1988 – 27 June 1988 (1 month, 1 week and 4 days)
Location	South-west Angola
Result	Inconclusive; Tripartite Accord talks continue

Belligerents
South Africa: South African Defence Force; South West African Territorial Force (SWATF)	Cuba; MPLA (FAPLA); SWAPO (PLAN)

Commanders and leaders
(South Africa) Magnus Malan (South Africa) Jan Geldenhuys (South Africa) Migo Delport (South Africa) Jan Hougaard (South Africa) Johannes Nortman (South Africa) Chris Serfontein	(Cuba) Arnaldo Ochoa (Cuba) Leopoldo Cintra Frías; António França; Unknown

Strength
South Africa: 1 500 combat troops 11 Olifant tanks 30 Ratel infantry fighting vehicles 1 Valkiri MRLs battery 1 G5 battery 1 G2 battery	Cuba: 11 000 personnel 32 T-55 tanks SWAPO: 2 000 guerillas

Casualties and losses
South Africa: 12 dead 2 wounded 2 Ratels lost 5 armoured vehicles lost	Cuba: South African claim: 300+ dead 3 tanks lost 3 BTR-60s lost 1 MiG-23 destroyed 3 SA-6 launchers destroyed Cuban Claim: 10 dead 1 tank damaged SWAPO: Unknown

The Battle of Calueque was a series of clashes between the South African Defence Force (SADF) and joint Cuban/ SWAPO/ FAPLA forces in south-west Angola during the South African Border War. The battle was significant in that it marked the largest direct clash between South African and Cuban forces during the conflict.

Between 16 May 1988 and 23 June 1988, there were an escalating series of skirmishes between South African and Cuban troops that resulted in both sides suffering minor losses. These skirmishes were followed by a more expansive clash between 24 June 1988 and 27 June 1988 in which a larger conventional engagement took place.

== Background ==
Between the end of the First World War and 1990, the territory of South-West Africa (today Namibia) was governed by South Africa under a League of Nations mandate. South-West Africa was effectively ruled from Pretoria as an extension of South Africa and, as such, was subject to many of the controversial racial laws adopted by the Apartheid regime. In 1962, the UN General Assembly adopted the position that South Africa's mandate over South-West Africa should be terminated and that the territory should be granted independence. South Africa effectively ignored this ruling and armed resistance to South African forces, spearheaded predominantly by the South West Africa Peoples Organisation (SWAPO), soon developed.

Between 1966 and 1989, South African forces waged a counter-insurgency campaign against SWAPO insurgents. This campaign was primarily conducted in the northern regions of the South-West Africa and neighboring Angola. After the collapse of Portuguese rule in Angola and the subsequent South African intervention in the Angolan Civil War, Cuban troops were deployed into Angola to support the communist regime of the MPLA and its armed forces FAPLA.

In the aftermath of Operation Savannah, SWAPO, which was ideologically aligned with the MPLA, made use of rear-area facilities in Angola as a means to expand their campaign against South African forces in South-West Africa. By the late-1970s, many SWAPO insurgents had been integrated into the FAPLA command structured and the two organizations often fielded intermingled formations.

Between 1978-1983, South African forces launched a number of military incursions into Angola. The nature of these raids gradually evolved from exclusively targeting SWAPO to striking directly at FAPLA bases and infrastructure. Additionally, continued South African support for UNITA (the MPLAs rival in the Angolan Civil War) drew the SADF into frequent confrontations with FAPLA and its supporting Cuban contingent.

The South African government reasoned that by supporting UNITA, they could deny a large segment of southern Angola to SWAPO forces and thus reduce the number of South African personnel who were needed to secure the lengthy South-West African border.

In 1987, FAPLA launched an offensive against UNITA forces in south-east Angola. The South African government committed troops to Angola to assist UNITA and the resulting conflict developed into the Battle of Cuito Cuanavale. During Operation Modular, the SADF inflicted a series of setbacks on FAPLA and effectively halted the offensive against UNITA. Fearful that the MPLAs entire position in southern Angola could collapse without support, Cuban premier Fidel Castro massively expanded the number of Cuban troops deployed to Angola between late-1987 & early-1988.

== Cuban deployment and South African withdrawal ==
After the conclusion of Operation Packer in April-1988, the SADF began a phased withdrawal of its conventional forces from south-east Angola. To prevent FAPLA from resuming its advance against UNITA, a small SADF force remained in the vicinity of Cuito Cuanavale and continued to harass the FAPLA forces stationed in the town.

As the number of South African personnel in Angola decreased, the number of Cuban troops increased. By April-1988, Cuban forces in Angola were reported to number upwards of 40 000 personnel.

While the Tripartite negotiations continued, Cuban, FAPLA and SWAPO units under General Cintras Frías advanced from Lubango in the direction of the South-West African border. The Cuban advanced coincided with an increase in PLAN activities across the border. The Cuban advance was supported by MiG-23 and MiG-21 fighter aircraft. During the period of April-1988 & May-1988, South African forces detected noted a number of border violations by high-flying Cuban aircraft.

Beginning in April-1988, Cuban/ FAPLA forces began to clash with SADF patrols which were engaged in follow-up operations against SWAPO insurgents. In two separate incidents, on 18 April-1988 and 4 May-1988 respectively, lightly armed SWATF patrols clashed with Cuban forces. During these engagements, at least three SWATF/ SADF personnel were killed.

By the beginning of May-1988, an estimated 11 000 Cuban troops, along with some 2 000 SWAPO guerillas, were operating in south-west Angola. A substantial portion of these forces, which included tanks, artillery and anti-aircraft missiles, were concentrated in the towns of Techipa and Xangogo.

South African command, including General Geldenhuys, viewed the Cuban buildup with increasing concern. General Geldenhuys hypothesized that the build-up was undertaken, in part, to strengthen the Cuban negotiating position at the ongoing Tripartite negotiations.

The South Africans feared that, beyond posturing, the Cuban force might attempt to strike at the Calueque dam. Occupied by South African troops since 1975, the Calueque installation supplied both water and electricity to large portions of northern South-West Africa/ Namibia. It was theorized by South African command that, in light of the heavy casualties suffered by FAPLA/ Cuban forces at Cuito Cuanavale, Cuban troops might attempt an assault against Calueque in an attempt restore Cuban prestige.

== Initial Skirmishes ==
The initial South African battleplan called for a strike against Techipa by elements of 32 Battalion. However, Commandant Jan Hougaard was concerned by reports of tanks and other armoured elements operating in the area. Instead of a frontal assault, two 32 Battlaion reconnaissance teams were deployed on 17 May-1988 to assess the strength of Cuban forces based at Techipa. The reconnaissance teams confirmed the presence of a large number of armoured vehicles and tanks at Techipa before they withdrew without incident.

On 8 June-1988, the South Africans deployed three companies of 32 Battalion, some 500 men in total, across the Kunene river. Though highly effective in a counter-insurgency role, the soldiers of 32 Battalion were not equipped to fight a conventional engagement against an armoured formation such as that which the Cubans had assembled at Techipa. Commandant Hougaard warned General Geldenhuys that, at best, the 32 Battalion troops might be able to slow any potential Cuban advance towards Calueque and the South-West Africa border. Subsequently, a combat team from 61 Mech was deployed south of Calueque but was ordered not to cross the Kunene river. The South African forces gradually expanded their patrols north of Calueque throughout the early-to-mid portion of June-1988.

During this period, a patrol from 32 Battalion's E Company was deployed in ambush positions south of Techipa when contact was made with a force of Cuban/ FAPLA infantry. The South Africans claimed to have inflicted at least five casualties on the Cuban forces before being forced to withdraw by a pursuing force of Cuban tanks. In the process of their withdrawal, the South African troops abandoned three Unimog trucks. Despite the pursuit, the South African forces regrouped at Calueque two days later having suffered no casualties.

In the aftermath of this skirmish, another platoon from 32 Battalion was deployed to monitor a Cuban outpost some twelve kilometers outside Techipa. After the patrol confirmed the presence of Cuban forces at the outpost, the SAAF dispatched a Bosbok reconnaissance aircraft to survey the output in preparation for a night-strike by Impala strike aircraft. An SA-6 surface-to-air missile was fired at the Bosbok and the pilot was forced to take evasive action. The airstrike was postponed to the following day but was ultimately cancelled when, during the course of the next morning, both the Bosbok and two Impala strike-jets were targeted by Cuban SAMs and forced to withdraw.

The presence of SA-6 missiles, and the inability of the SAAF to neutralize these systems from the air, convinced South African command to deploy the 61 Mech battle-group across the Kunene river. A logistical challenge facing the South Africans was that the road atop the Calueque dam had not been completed and could not support the heavy equipment, including the tanks and artillery, fielded by 61 Mech. Subsequently, South African engineers covertly worked to construct earth ramps which could support the South African armour.

By the evening of 22 June-1988, the entire South African ground force, including a G5 artillery battery, had, using the improvised crossing at Calueque, deployed north of the Kunene river. Simultaneously, 32 Battalion reconnaissance elements noted that a large Cuban column was moving southwards from Techipa.

== Battle ==
The South Africans interpreted the Cuban's southward deployment as an attempt to occupy Calueque and possibly even launch a cross-border incursion. As such, the overall South African ground commander, Colonel Migo Delport of 32 Battalion, deployed his forces with the intent of covering the Calueque installations.

=== 24 June ===
A combined FAPLA/ Cuban force moved out of Xangogo with the intent of reoccupying the Angolan town of Cuamato. These units made contact with a South African force, composed of elements from 201 Battalion and 8 SAI, deployed to screen the northern approach to Cuamato. A clash erupted in which the South Africans withdrew after losing two Buffel armoured personnel carriers. Despite the South African withdrawal, the FAPLA/ Cuban force did not continue on to Cuamato.

South African forward observers noted Cuban artillery bombardments which were designed to mask the southward movements of Cuban armour.

=== 25 June ===
After being reorganised, 201 Battalion was redeployed north of Cuamato to guard against any subsequent attempts by FAPLA to reoccupy the town.

Cuban scouting parties were reported within fifteen kilometers of the Kunene river.

=== 26 June ===
Cuban forces resumed their southward movement from Techipa towards Calueque. South African forces, including Ratel IFVs and Olifant tanks were deployed on both sides of the road between Techipa and Calueque. At 17:00, South African and Cuban forces exchanged artillery fire.

At 20:00, South African forces simulated an air attack against Techipa by tying strips of chaff to meteorological balloons. The balloons were then released just north of Calueque. Cuban air defense reacted by firing several SA-6 missiles at what they assumed to be another attempted strike by Impala strike aircraft. These missile launches enabled South African artillery observers to locate Cuban positions.

Beginning at 20:00, and continuing for several hours thereafter, South African G5 howitzers began shelling the Cuban positions. The response by Cuban artillery was minimal and inaccurate. The South African barrage reportedly eliminated three SA-6 launcher sites and degraded Cuban fire control and HQ elements to the extent that Cuban artillery played no further roll in the clash.

=== 27 June ===
Between 05:00 and 08:00, South African forces advanced to within eighteen kilometers of Techipa. At 08:00, South African Ratel IFVs made contact with a force of Cuban infantry supported by tanks and other armoured vehicles. A Ratel-90 was hit by anti-tank fire and a South African platoon commander was killed. A second Ratel-90 was immobilized after being shot in the gearbox.

As the contact developed, the South Africans attempted to maneuver their Ratel-ZT3s, which were equipped with anti-tank missiles, to engage the Cuban T-54 tanks. However, the conditions were unfavourable to the Ratel-ZT3s and the supporting elements of Ratel-90s were forced to engaged the more heavily armoured T-54s. The Ratel-90s reportedly destroyed several Cuban vehicles, including a T-54, before attempting to break contact.

As the Ratels withdrew, South African Olifant tanks arrived at the scene of the contact. The Olifants claimed to have destroyed an additional T-54, a BTR-60, and several supporting vehicles before the Cuban force withdrew. By 10:00, the contact was broken as both the South African and Cuban forces moved out of range.

Between 10:40 and 12:55, smaller skirmishes continued between elements of 32 Battalion and a Cuban column which was attempting a flanking maneuver. During this period, the South Africans withdrew the bulk of their forces southwards across the Kunene river, this withdrawal was supported by artillery fire.

At 13:55, a force of eight Cuban MiG-23s were sighted by a patrol of 102 Battalion moving in the direction in Calueque. The MiG-23s executed a ground attack against Calueque. The dam, and the improvised bridge which had been constructed by the South Africans, were struck several times by parachute-retarded bombs. Another bomb exploded near a parked Buffel killing eleven South African personnel from 8 SAI. In response, the anti-aircraft troop of 32 Battalion engaged the MiG-23s with their Ystervark anti-aircraft guns. According to South African sources, a MiG-23 was reportedly hit by South African ground-fire and crashed during the return to Lubango. The shootdown of the MiG-23 is disputed by Cuban sources.

By the evening, the South Africans had successfully withdrawn the bulk of their forces across the Kunene river and the Cubans had moved northwards to Techipa. With the bridge at Calueque damaged, the South African Olifants were forced to use a separate bridge to the west in order to cross back into South West Africa.

== Aftermath and disengagement ==
Following the clash, a de-facto ceasefire emerged between South African and Cuban forces, though minor contacts between the South Africa security forces and SWAPO insurgents continued throughout the remainder of the year.

The Tripartite Negotiations continued in wake of the clash. The deaths of young national servicemen during the fighting at Calueque caused political discontent in South Africa while further Cuban offensive action in the direction of Calueque failed to materialise. By September 1, 1988, the final South African troops had been withdrawn from Angola.

== Nomenclature ==
Because of the haphazard nature of the South African buildup, considerable confusion exists about the exact name of the operations which made up the clashes in south-west Angola in mid-1988. Initially codenamed Operation Excite/Hilti, as the South African forces expanded, the name of the operation was changed several times to reflect the expanded nature of the South African deployment. This matter was complicated further by the additional operational names given to tasks allotted to the SAAF.

Additionally, several South African sources denote the clash at Calueque as an expansion or sub-theater of the Battle of Cuito Cuanavale in spite of the fact that the clashes between Calueque and Techipa occurred after the conclusion of Operation Packer.

== Analysis ==
Despite the fact that the dam itself was exposed to combat action only on the final day of the battle, the protection of the installation at Calueque, from what was perceived as Cuban aggression, was the primary objective for the South African forces. As such, the South Africans operated under the assumption that the capture of the dam was the objective of the Cuban offensive.

Conversely, it remains unclear whether the capture of Calueque was indeed an objective of the Cuban battlegroup. However, the Cuban advance in south-west Angola enabled SWAPO to operate near to the South West African border with a degree of freedom that they had not enjoyed for several years. Additionally, throughout mid-1988 the Ovamboland region of South West Africa was suffering from a severe drought. The loss of Calueque installation, and the water it provided to South West Africa, would have been a strategic blow to the South African forces.
