= Zemba =

Ethnic group in Namibia and Angola

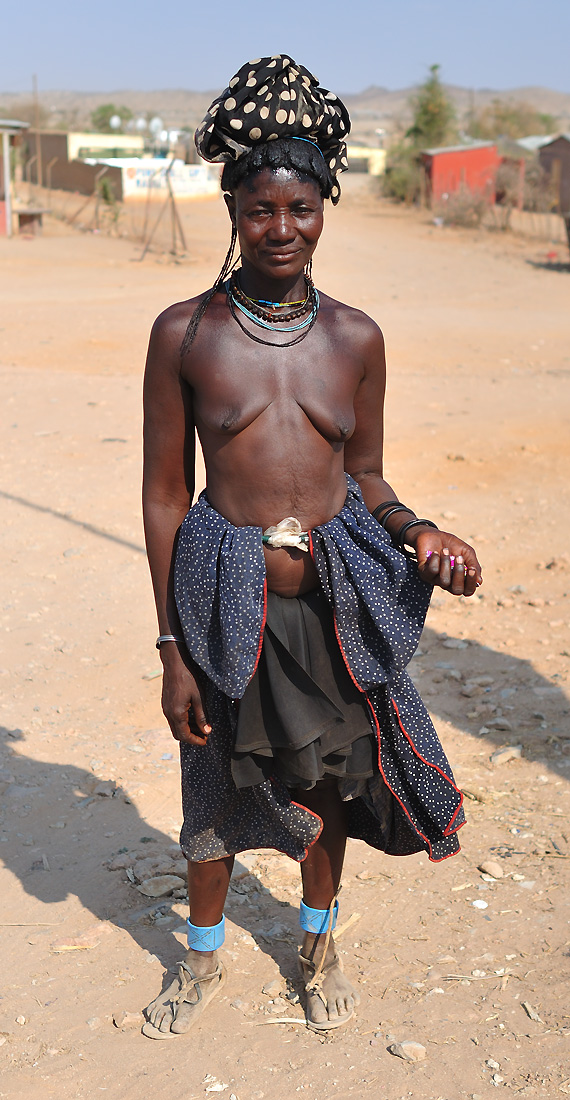
A Zemba woman

The Zemba people (singular: OmuZemba, plural: OvaZemba) are a Bantu ethnic group residing in the border regions of Namibia and Angola. In Namibia, they are predominantly found in the Kunene region, most notably in the Opuwa area. They speak the Zemba language, also known as OtjiZemba or Dhimba. The Zemba are well-known for their distinctive hairstyles, intricate iron and copper jewelry, as well as traditional clothing that often incorporates animal hides. Additionally, they decorate themselves with a blend of ash, ochre paste, and rancid butter to enhance their appearance.

== Culture ==
=== Economy ===
The Zemba have a semi-nomadic pastoralist lifestyle, relying on livestock herding, especially cattle, goats, donkeys and sheep. They have traditionally practiced transhumance, moving their livestock seasonally in search of grazing lands. The Zemba also rely on their cattle for self-sustainability and commerce, as they provide milk, meat, and hides. They place great importance on selective breeding to ensure the health and productivity of their herds. In addition to their practical functions, cattle hold considerable cultural value and are frequently exchanged or sold during significant life events, such as marriages or funerals. Apart from livestock, the Zemba practice subsistence agriculture, employing traditional farming techniques to cultivate small plots of land and growing crops such as sorghum, millet, maize, beans and vegetables to supplement their diet. These agricultural activities are highly dependent on seasonal rainfall and access to water sources.

=== Clothing and hair style ===
The Zemba women have a unique pure black hairstyle. It is emphasized with the decorations made of thin beads of white, red, blue and yellow colours.

== Human rights ==
February 2012, traditional Zemba issued a human rights complaints declaration to the Government of Namibia, the African Union and to the OHCHR of the United Nations that lists violations of civil, cultural, economic, environmental, social and political rights perpetrated by the Government of Namibia.

In September 2012 the United Nations Special Rapporteur on the Rights of Indigenous Peoples visited Namibia. He stated that in Namibia there is a lack of recognition of the minority indigenous tribes' communal lands.

23 November 2012, Zemba communities from Omuhonga and Epupa, together with the Himba people, protested in Okanguati against Namibia's plans to construct a dam in the Kunene River in the Baynes Mountains and against increasing mining operations on their traditional land and human rights violations against them.

25 March 2013, Zemba joined over thousand Himba people to march in protest again, this time in Opuwo, against the ongoing human rights violations that they endure in Namibia. They expressed their frustration over their chief not being recognized as a "Traditional Authority" by government, plans to build the Orokawe dam in the Baynes Mountains at the Kunene River, culturally inappropriate education, the illegal fencing of parts of their traditional land, the lack of land rights to the territory that they have lived upon for centuries, and against the implementation of the Communal Land Reform Act of 2002.

== See also ==
- Tjimba people
- Himba people
- Herero people
