= Calueque Dam =

Dam in Angola

- Map of Angola showing the location of Calueque Dam
- Country: Angola
- Location: Kunene River, Kunene Province
- Coordinates: 17°16′22″S 14°32′40″E
- Purpose: Power, Drinking, Irrigation
- Status: Operational
- Construction began: 1972
- Opening date: 2015

Dam and spillways
- Impounds: Kunene River
- Elevation at crest: 1,048 metres (3,438 ft) above mean sea level
- Dam volume: 475,000,000 cubic metres (1.6774466693×10^{10} cu ft)

The Calueque Dam, is an operational multipurpose dam across the Kunene River, in Kunene Province, in southwestern Angola. The dam stores water for the 347 MW (465,000 hp) Ruacana Hydroelectric Power Station, in neighboring Namibia. Its waters are also used for the irrigation of farmland, both in Angola and Namibia.

== Location ==
The dam is located in the town of Calueque, close to the international border with Namibia, approximately 196 kilometres (122 mi), by road, southwest of the town of Ondjiva, the provincial capital.

The dam is approximately 1,282 kilometres (797 mi), by road, south of Luanda, the capital city of Angola. The geographical coordinates of Calueque Dam are 17°16'22.0"S, 14°32'40.0"E (Latitude:-17.272778; Longitude:14.544444).

== History ==
In October 1964, representatives of the government of Portugal and the government of South Africa met in Lisbon, Portugal and signed agreements relating to the construction of dams on the Kunene River, thereby controlling the rate of flow of the river and maximizing electricity output at the dams. The agreements also related to maximizing the availability of water for use by humans and animals in Angola and South West Africa (now Namibia). The agreements spelt out who owned what and who would construct, operate and pay for (a) Gove Dam (b) Calueque Dam and the associated Gove Hydroelectric Power Station and the Ruacana Hydroelectric Power Station.

Construction of the Calueque Dam started in 1972. Work on the dam was abandoned in 1976 due to the Angolan Civil War. At the time construction stopped in 1976, approximately 70 percent of the civil works had been completed and the dam could provide some water for human and animal use. In 1988, "an attack" severely damaged the incomplete structure.

== Repairs and optimization ==
In 2012, repairs and refurbishment of the partially complete dam commenced. Rehabilitation work was concluded in 2015. Other optimization work includes the rehabilitation of the canal carrying water for human and animal use, from the dam at Calueque, Angola to Oshakati, Namibia, measuring 150 kilometres (93 mi).

== See also ==
- Energy in Angola
