= Epupa =

Epupa (Herero for "falling waters") may refer to:

- Epupa Falls, waterfalls on the border between Angola and Namibia
- Epupa Constituency, electoral constituency in north-western Namibia named after the falls
- Epupa, Namibia, the settlement at Epupa Falls
