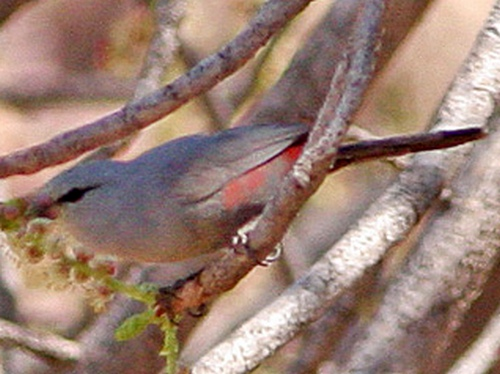

Conservation status
- Least Concern (IUCN 3.1)

Scientific classification
- Kingdom: Animalia
- Phylum: Chordata
- Class: Aves
- Order: Passeriformes
- Family: Estrildidae
- Genus: Glaucestrilda
- Species: G. thomensis

Binomial name
- Glaucestrilda thomensis (Sousa, 1888)

Synonyms
- Estrilda thomensis

= Cinderella waxbill =

Species of bird

The Cinderella waxbill (Glaucestrilda thomensis) is a near-threatened species of estrildid finch found in drier regions of southwestern Angola around the Namibe Province, north and east to the southwest of the Huíla Province and north to Fazenda do Cuito in Huambo, and also in the extreme northwestern part of Namibia. It has an estimated global distribution of 95,700 km^{2} (36,900 sq mi).

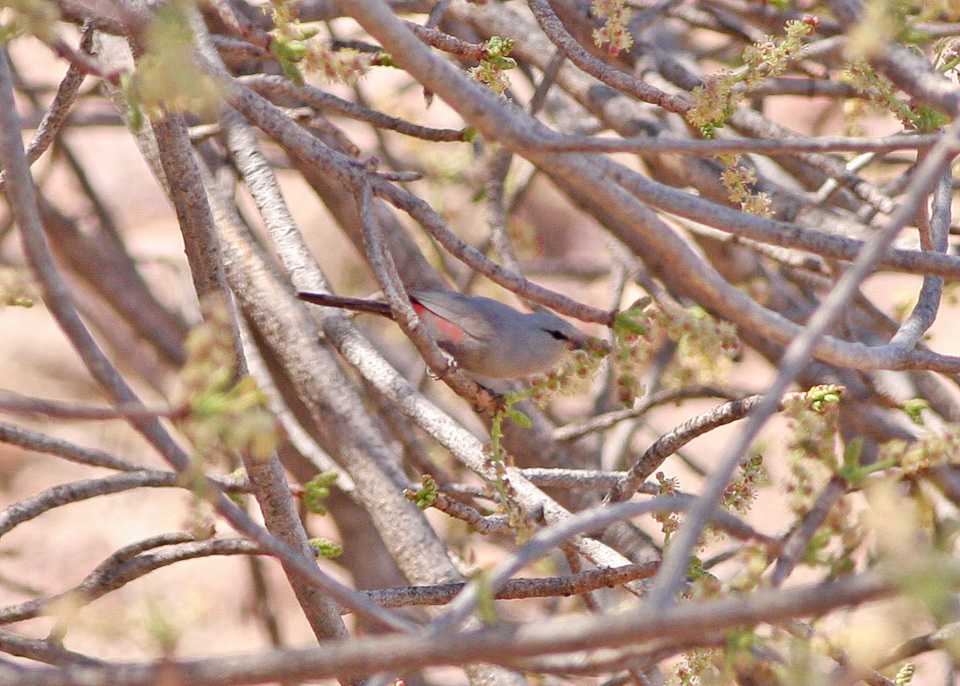

== Habitat ==
The Cinderella waxbill is found in subtropical and tropical (lowland), dry shrubland, savannah and forest habitats at altitudes of 200 to 500 m (660 to 1,640 ft). It is observed that the recent development of a hydroelectric plant on the Cunene River at Epupa Falls has caused changes to insect biodiversity which were relied on by Cinderella waxbills during feeding of its young, thus threatening its food source to be depleted.

The Cinderella waxbill also eats grass seeds, nectar and insects; it is diurnal.
