= Ruacana Constituency =

Electoral constituency in the Omusati region of northern Namibia

Coordinates: 17°25′S 14°18′E

Ruacana Constituency (red) in the Omusati Region

Ruacana Constituency is an electoral constituency in the Omusati Region of Namibia on the border to Angola. It had 9,285 registered voters in 2020. Its district capital is the town of Ruacana. Ruacana Constituency covers an area of 5,377 km^{2} (2,076 sq mi). It had a population of 14,857 in 2011, down from 31,496 in 2001.

The constituency was created in 1998 from areas partly in Kunene Region. At that time, a Ruacana Constituency existed in Kunene, extending all the way to the Atlantic Ocean. As both the Ruacana Falls in the Kunene River and the town of Ruacana were moved to Omusati, the constituency in Kunene Region was renamed Epupa Constituency, and the new constituency got the name Ruacana.

== Politics ==
As in all constituencies in Omusati, Ruacana constituency is traditionally a stronghold of the South West Africa People's Organization (SWAPO) party. The 2004 regional election was won by SWAPO politician Namutenya Kornelius Lazarus. He received 2,396 of the 3,072 votes cast.

In the 2015 local and regional elections SWAPO candidate Andreas Shintama gained 3,409 votes and won by a landslide, while Daniel Munepapa of the National Unity Democratic Organisation (NUDO) obtained 233, Immanuel Shikongo of the Democratic Turnhalle Alliance (DTA) gained 61, and Abner Uunona of the Rally for Democracy and Progress (RDP) gained 57 votes. Councillor Shintama (SWAPO) was reelected in the 2020 regional election. He obtained 2,959 voted, followed by independent candidate Jackson Tjikomeno with 574 votes and Leonard Kuduva of the Independent Patriots for Change (IPC), an opposition party formed in August 2020, with 429 votes. Shintama was also elected to replace Modestus Amutse as the chairperson of the Omusati Regional Council.
