= Ovinjange =

Village in the Kunene Region of Namibia

Ovinjange is a village in the Epupa Constituency of Namibia's north-eastern Kunene Region. It is situated 15 kilometres (9.3 mi) north of Opuwo.

Former Kunene governor Angelika Muharukua had her homestead in Ovinjange.
