= Angelika Muharukua =

Namibian politician

Governor of the Kunene Region
- In office 2015–2017

Personal details
- Born: 12 January 1958
- Died: 1 October 2017 (aged 59)

Angelika Kazetjindire Muharukua (12 January 1958 Opuwo, Kunene Region – 1 October 2017) was a Namibian politician. An ethnic Herero from northwestern Namibia, Muharukua joined the South West Africa People's Organization (SWAPO) in 1979. She was a surprise choice by President Sam Nujoma for the 2nd National Assembly of Namibia in 1995 and remained in the National Assembly since. In May 2004, she was chosen to replace Marlene Mungunda as deputy minister of Women Affairs and Child Welfare, later renamed the Ministry of Gender Equality and Child Welfare.

In September 2012 Angelika Muharukua contradicted international human rights laws such as the United Nations Declaration on the Rights of Indigenous Peoples when she publicly announced that indigenous peoples such as the Himba and Zemba would not have the right to choose their own traditional leaders.

On 27 March 2013, Angelika Muharukua publicly opposed protest by about a thousand indigenous Himba and Zemba who were manifesting their grievances that their children are not receiving culturally appropriate education, but are instead forced to cut their children's traditional hair styles, remove their cultural attires and therefore forced to remove their cultural identity.

Angelika Muharukua was married to Kenatjironga Festus Muharukua who died in a car accident in March 2015. She lived in Ovinjange but the couple also had a residence in Windhoek's Hochland Park suburb.

On 1 October 2017, Angelika Muharukua in a Windhoek hospital. The cause was believed to be heart attack but was officially unstated. The Office of the President extended its condolences.
