= Swartbooisdrift =

- Settlement
- Location in Namibia
- Coordinates: 17°19′S 13°52′E
- Country: Namibia
- Region: Kunene Region
- Constituency: Epupa Constituency

Population (2010)
  - Total: 150−300 (seasonal)
- Time zone: UTC+1 (WAT)
  - Summer (DST): UTC+2 (WAST)
- Climate: BWh

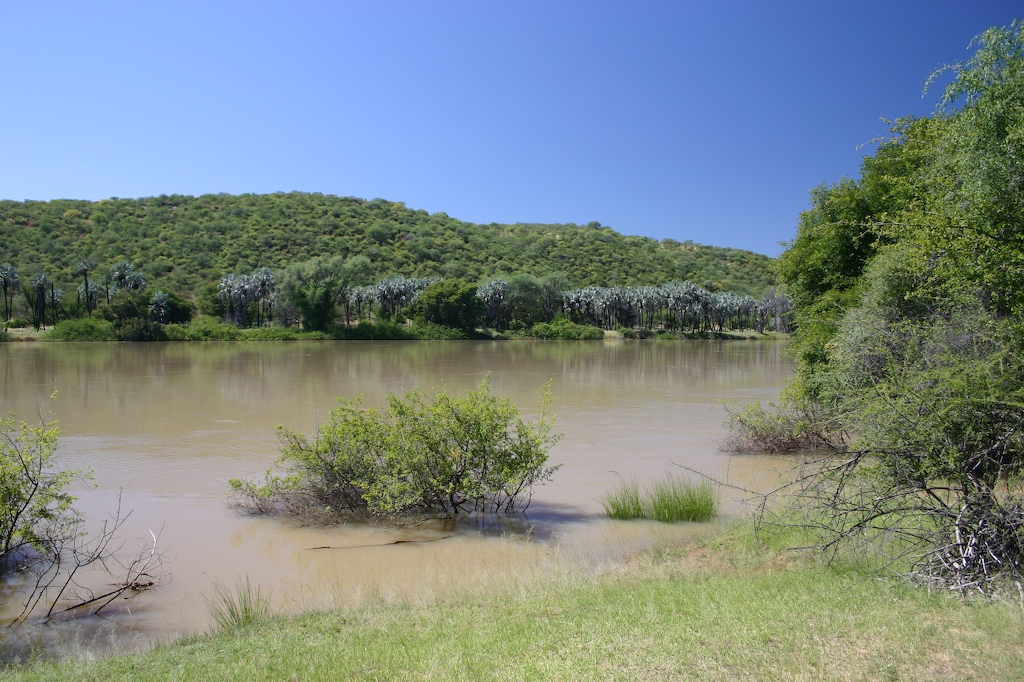
The shallow Kunene near Swartbooisdrift

Swartbooisdrift is a small settlement in the Kunene Region in the north of Namibia. It is situated on the banks of the Kunene River, at the Angolan border on the minor road D3700 and falls within the Epupa electoral constituency. Swartbooisdrift is populated by 150 - 300 semi-nomadic people of Himba and Herero descent, depending on the season.

The settlement is named after the Swartbooi clan of the Nama people who crossed the Kunene here to explore Angola in the 19th century. The Dorsland Trekkers also crossed the Kunene River here in 1881 to move into Angola. In commemoration of this migratory movement, the Dorsland Trekkers Monument has been erected on a hill just outside the settlement. Petrus Swartbooi, one of the Swartbooi Nama's captains, raided the area in the 1890s.

Swartbooisdrift was the administrative centre of the Kaokoland from 1925 to 1939. During that time a police station was operational at the settlement. Afterwards, administrative control of the area shifted to Ohopoho (today's Opuwo). From 1938 to 1942, the settlement was one of a number of guard posts set up on all shallow stretches of the Kunene to prevent the spread of cattle lung disease into Namibia.

Swartbooisdrift is a poor settlement with no access to electricity or clean water. However, it does feature a clinic and a school. People live from subsistence cattle farming. There is a sodalite mine to the east.
