= Abrus kaokoensis =

Scientific classification
- Kingdom: Plantae
- Clade: Tracheophytes
- Clade: Angiosperms
- Clade: Eudicots
- Clade: Rosids
- Order: Fabales
- Family: Fabaceae
- Subfamily: Faboideae
- Genus: Abrus
- Species: A. kaokoensis

Binomial name
- Abrus kaokoensis Swanepoel & Kolberg

Species of plant

Abrus kaokoensis is a shrub, part of the legume family Fabaceae, native to Namibia. The species is named for the country's Kaokoveld Desert.

== Description ==
Abrus kaokoensis grows as a woody suffrutex (subshrub) 0.3–1 m (1.0–3.3 ft) tall. The leaves consist of four to eight pairs of leaflets, of oblong to obovate shape. Leaflets measure up 16 mm (0.6 in) long. Inflorescences are on a rachis measuring up to 4.7 cm (2 in) long. The flowers are clustered, with a corolla of blue to purple petals. The fruits feature oblong pods measuring up to 4.7 cm (2 in) long, each with two to six seeds. The species is considered most similar to Abrus schimperi.

== Distribution and habitat ==
Abrus kaokoensis is only known from three locations in Namibia, all in Epupa Constituency near the Angola border. Therefore, the species may also occur in Angola, but areas neighbouring the Namibia border are little documented botanically. The type specimen was from the Kunene River valley. The species is able to grow on stony soil or in rocks, at altitudes of 725–890 m (2,000–3,000 ft). Abrus kaokoensis thrives in full sun to partial shade, in small communities of about 40 plants each.

== Conservation ==
Despite its presence in a limited number of locations, Abrus kaokoensis is not considered threatened, however, it is uncommon. Two of the species' populations coincide with livestock farming, but those populations appear healthy. The other population, in the Baynes Mountains, is in an unpopulated area.

A natural threat to Abrus kaokoensis is blister beetles, which consume the plant's flowers. As a result, few flowers in the studied area went on to produce pods and seeds.
