= Pseudoidium abri =

Scientific classification
- Kingdom: Fungi
- Division: Ascomycota
- Class: Leotiomycetes
- Order: Helotiales
- Family: Erysiphaceae
- Genus: Erysiphe
- Species: P. abri

Binomial name
- Pseudoidium abri (Hosag., Vijay, Udaiyan & Manian) U. Braun & R.T.A. Cook, 2012

Synonyms
- Oidium abri Hosag., Vijay, Udaiyan & Manian, 1992

Species of fungus

Pseudoidium abri is a species of powdery mildew in the family Erysiphaceae. It is found in India, where it affects plants in the genus Abrus.

== Description ==
The fungus forms effuse patches of mycelium on the leaves of its host. Pseudoidium abri, like most Erysiphaceae, is highly host-specific and infects only Abrus. It is only known from India, on the type host Abrus precatorius.

== Taxonomy ==
The fungus was formally described in 1992 by Hosagoudar, Vijayanthi, Udaiyan and Manian with the basionym Oidium abri based on collections in India. The species was transferred to the anamorph genus Pseudoidium by Uwe Braun and Roger T.A. Cook in 2012. Pseudoidium is now considered conspecific with its former teleomorph genus Erysiphe but P. abri has not yet been given a new combination.
