= Ruacana =

Town in northern Namibia

- Town
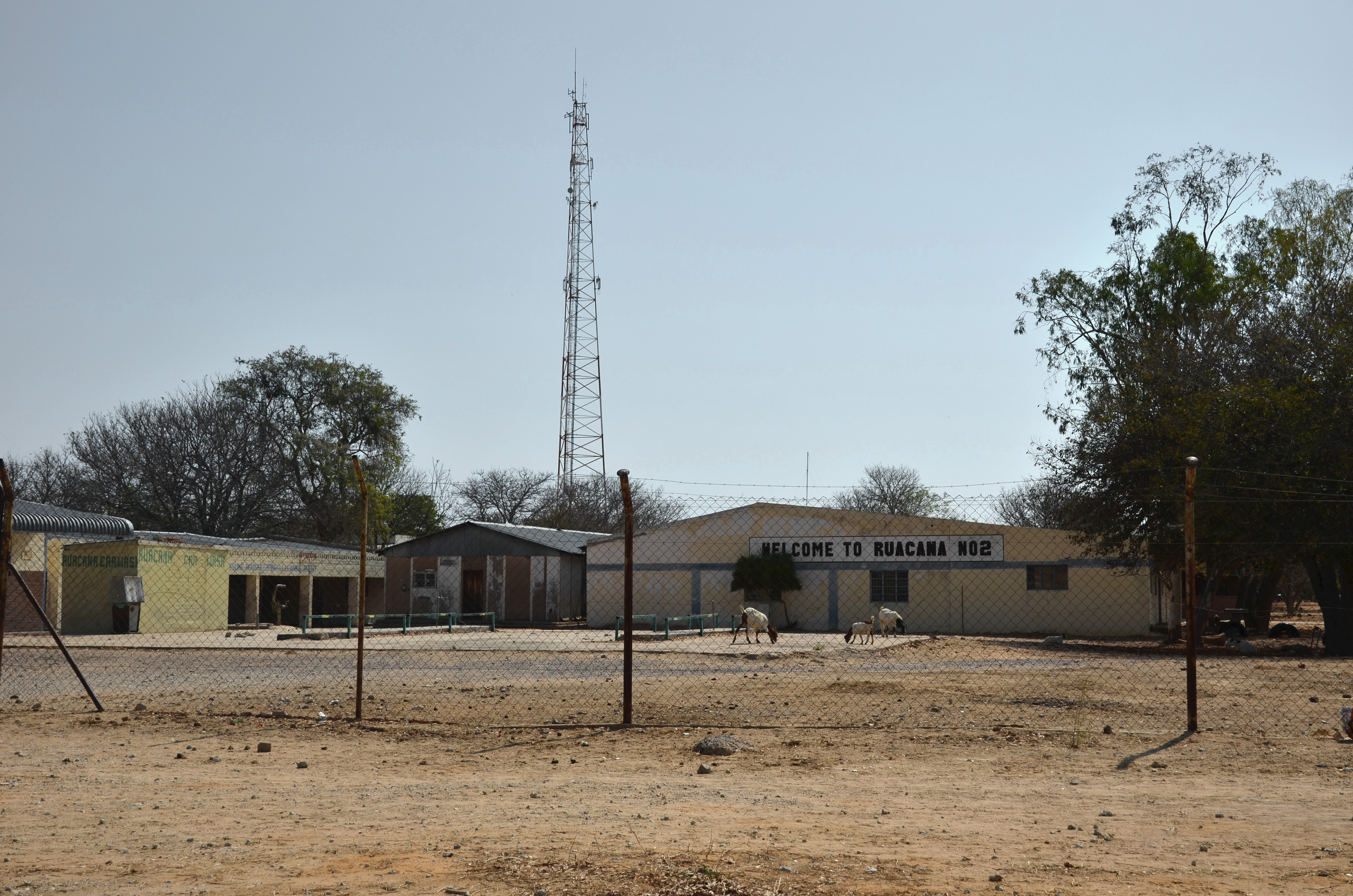

- Location in Namibia
- Coordinates: 17°26′16″S 14°26′9″E
- Country: Namibia
- Region: Omusati Region
- Constituency: Ruacana Constituency
- Settlement: 1999
- Village: 2005
- Town: 2010

Government
  - Major: Simon Shooya
- Elevation: 3,563 ft (1,086 m)

Population (2023)
  - Total: 5,939
- Time zone: UTC+2 (SAST)
- Climate: BSh

Ruacana is a town in the Omusati Region of northern Namibia and the district capital of the Ruacana electoral constituency. It is located on the border with Angola on the river Kunene. The town is known for the picturesque Ruacana Falls nearby, and for the Ruacana Power Station. Ruacana had a population of 5,939 people in 2023.

== Geography ==
The place receives annual average rainfall of 426 millimetres (16.8 in), although in the 2010/2011 rainy season, 960 millimetres (38 in) of rain was measured.

Historical population
Year	Pop.	±% p.a.
2011	2,985	—
2023	5,939	+5.90%

== History ==
Ovazemba and Ovahimba people are native to the area. There are two theories for the origin of the name. Kaure reports that according to Ovazemba oral tradition, the name comes from a local leader named Ruhakana, while Olivier claims it is derived from orua hakahana (Otjiherero), "hurrying waters".

Ruacana was developed around the Ruacana Hydroelectric Power Station, a major underground hydroelectric plant linked to the nearby dam across the border in Angola at Calueque. In the early 1970s, 27 houses were built for employees of the South West Africa Water and Electricity Commission (now NamWater It was declared a settlement in 1999, granted local government as a village in 2005, and declared a town in 2010.

The dam and pumping station were bombed in a Cuban airstrike in 1988, during the Angolan Civil War. The facility was partially repaired, and today NamPower operates three turbines producing a maximum of 240 megawatts.

== Politics ==
Ruacana was proclaimed town in 2010. Since then it has been governed by a town council that has seven seats. The 2015 local authority election was won by SWAPO, which gained six seats and 826 votes. The remaining seat went to the National Unity Democratic Organisation (NUDO), which gained 53 votes.

SWAPO also won the 2020 local authority election. It obtained 603 votes and gained five seats. The Independent Patriots for Change (IPC), an opposition party formed in August 2020, obtained 192 votes and gained the remaining two seats.

== Economy and infrastructure ==
The 1500-acre farm Etunda is situated near Ruacana. It is run as a government-supported irrigation scheme and was established in 1993. Half of the farm is commercial irrigation land, while the other half is allocated to 82 small-scale farmers. Etunda cultivates maize, wheat, watermelons, bananas, and other produce.

The Ruacana Vocational High School is located in Ruacana.
