= Abrus sambiranensis =

Conservation status
- Endangered (IUCN 3.1)

Scientific classification
- Kingdom: Plantae
- Clade: Tracheophytes
- Clade: Angiosperms
- Clade: Eudicots
- Clade: Rosids
- Order: Fabales
- Family: Fabaceae
- Subfamily: Faboideae
- Genus: Abrus
- Species: A. sambiranensis

Binomial name
- Abrus sambiranensis R.Vig.

Species of plant

Abrus sambiranensis is a plant in the family Fabaceae, native to Madagascar. It grows as a herb or vine.

== Distribution and habitat ==
Abrus sambiranensis is endemic to Madagascar, where it is confined to Antsiranana and Mahajanga provinces in the north of the country. It is found from sea level to 500 m (1,600 ft) altitude.

== Conservation ==
As of 2015, there were only four known subpopulations of Abrus sambiranensis. Threats to the species include from soil erosion due to deforestation and from harvesting for use in traditional medicine. Two subpopulations are present in Manongarivo Special Reserve where the species is conserved.
