= Pongamiopsis =

Scientific classification
- Kingdom: Plantae
- Clade: Tracheophytes
- Clade: Angiosperms
- Clade: Eudicots
- Clade: Rosids
- Order: Fabales
- Family: Fabaceae
- Subfamily: Faboideae
- Tribe: Millettieae
- Genus: Pongamiopsis; R.Vig. (1950)

Species
- 3; see text

Genus of legumes

Pongamiopsis is a genus of flowering plants in the family Fabaceae. It includes three species of trees and shrubs endemic to Madagascar. They grow in seasonally-dry tropical woodland and xerophytic shrubland in northern, western, and southern Madagascar, often on limestone outcrops.

- Pongamiopsis amygdalina (Baill.) R.Vig.
- Pongamiopsis pervilleana (Baill.) R.Vig.
- Pongamiopsis viguieri Du Puy & Labat
