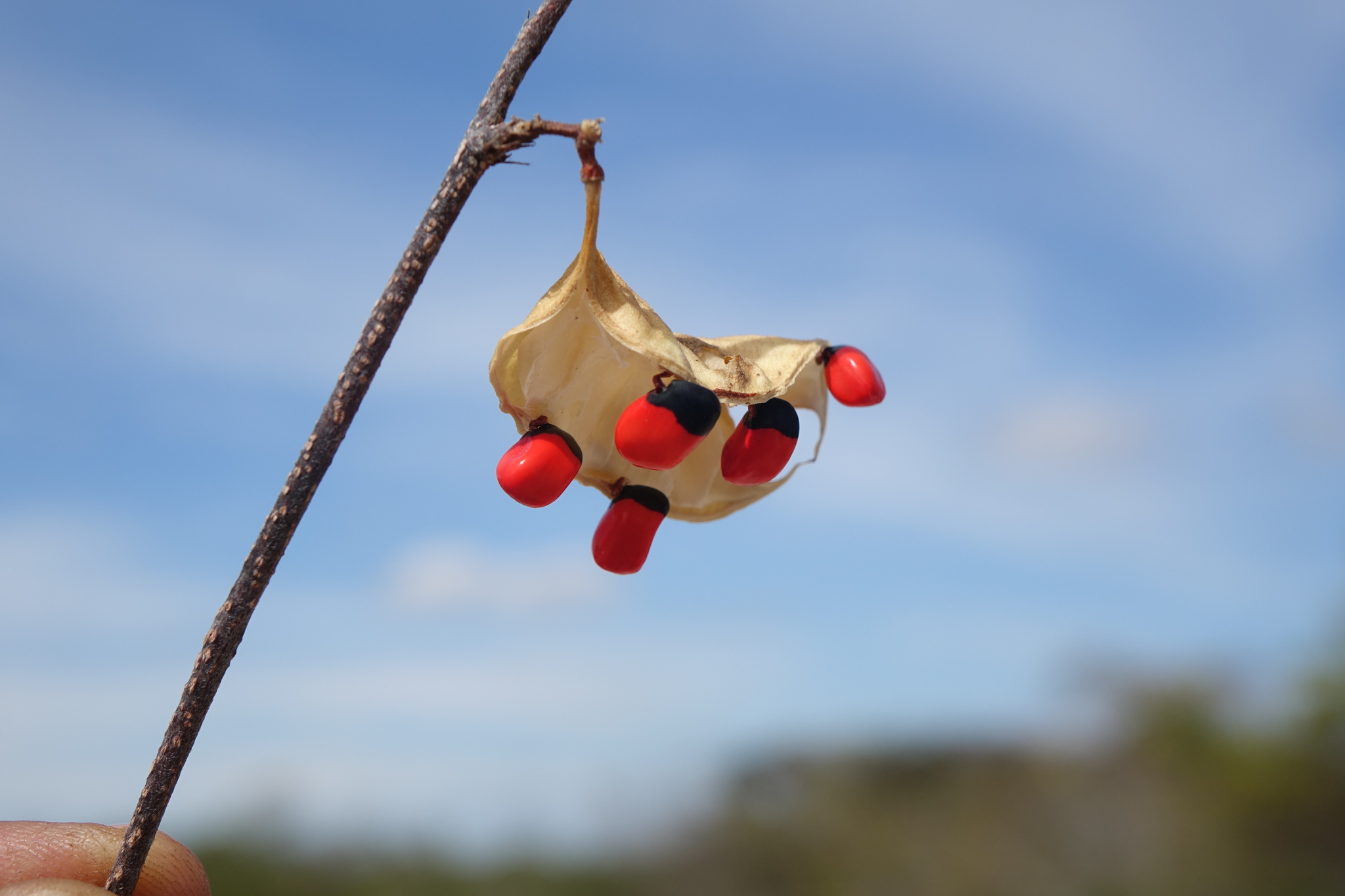

Conservation status
- Least Concern (IUCN 3.1)

Scientific classification
- Kingdom: Plantae
- Clade: Tracheophytes
- Clade: Angiosperms
- Clade: Eudicots
- Clade: Rosids
- Order: Fabales
- Family: Fabaceae
- Subfamily: Faboideae
- Genus: Abrus
- Species: A. aureus

Binomial name
- Abrus aureus R.Vig.

Synonyms
- Abrus cyaneus R.Vig.; Abrus grandiflorus R.Vig.

= Abrus aureus =

Species of plant

Abrus aureus is a plant in the family Fabaceae, native to Madagascar. It grows as a herb or liana.

== Distribution and habitat ==
Abrus aureus is endemic to Madagascar, where it is widespread. Its habitat is in forests and agricultural areas, from sea level to 200 m (700 ft) altitude.

== Conservation ==
Abrus aureus is threatened by wildfires. However, its widespread distribution and presence in numerous protected areas has given it an IUCN assessment of least concern. It is locally used in traditional medicine.
