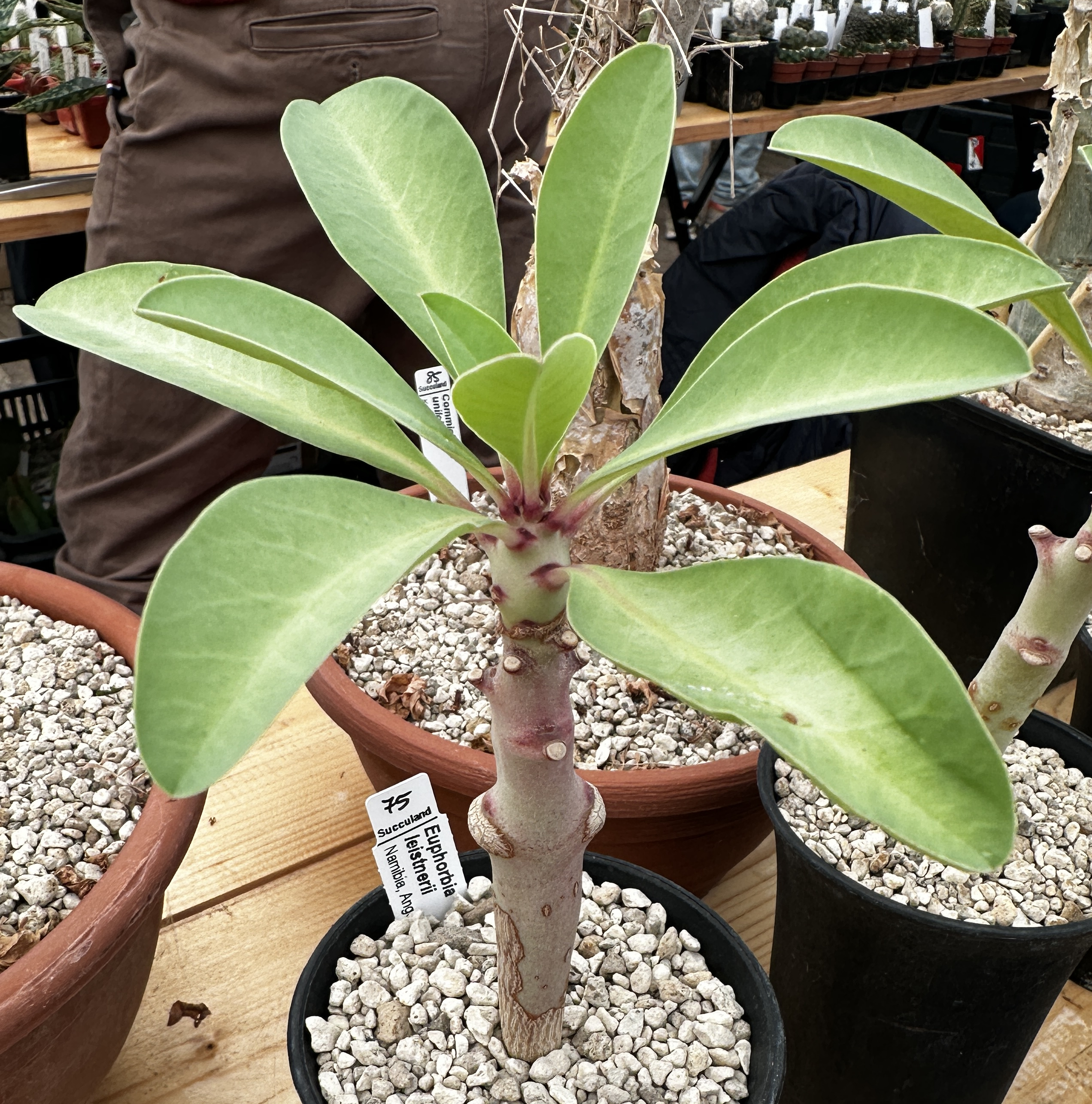

Conservation status
- Vulnerable (IUCN 3.1)

Scientific classification
- Kingdom: Plantae
- Clade: Embryophytes
- Clade: Tracheophytes
- Clade: Spermatophytes
- Clade: Angiosperms
- Clade: Eudicots
- Clade: Rosids
- Order: Malpighiales
- Family: Euphorbiaceae
- Genus: Euphorbia
- Species: E. leistneri

Binomial name
- Euphorbia leistneri R.H.Archer

= Euphorbia leistneri =

Species of flowering plant

Euphorbia leistneri is a species of succulent plant in the family Euphorbiaceae. It is endemic to northwest-Namibia and southwest-Angola near the Kunene river. Its natural habitat is subtropical or tropical dry shrubland. It is threatened by habitat loss. Euphorbia leistneri is closely related to Euphorbia monteiri.
