= OPW =

OPW may refer to:

- Obóz Polski Walczącej (Camp of Fighting Poland)
- Office of Public Works, an agency of the Irish Government
- One Pro Wrestling
- Opuwo Airport (IATA: OPW)
- OPW is a subsidiary of Dover Corporation
- Osaka Pro Wrestling
- Our Perfect Wedding, a South African wedding television show
- GNOME Outreach Program for Women, later renamed to Outreachy

== See also ==
- Organisation for the Prohibition of Chemical Weapons (OPCW)
