= Abrus madagascariensis =

Conservation status
- Near Threatened (IUCN 3.1)

Scientific classification
- Kingdom: Plantae
- Clade: Tracheophytes
- Clade: Angiosperms
- Clade: Eudicots
- Clade: Rosids
- Order: Fabales
- Family: Fabaceae
- Subfamily: Faboideae
- Genus: Abrus
- Species: A. madagascariensis

Binomial name
- Abrus madagascariensis R.Vig.

Species of plant

Abrus madagascariensis is a plant in the family Fabaceae, native to Madagascar. It grows as a herb, shrub or liana.

== Distribution and habitat ==
Abrus madagascariensis is endemic to Madagascar, where it is confined to Antsiranana and Mahajanga provinces, including the Sambirano region, in the north and northwest of the country. Its habitat is in dry deciduous woodland from sea level to 500 metres (1,600 ft) altitude.

== Conservation ==
As of 2015, there were only 11 known subpopulations of Abrus madagascariensis. Wildfires are the main threat to the species' habitat. Eight subpopulations are present in protected areas (including Ankarafantsika National Park) where the species is conserved.
