= Olushandja Dam =

Dam on the Etaka River in Namibia

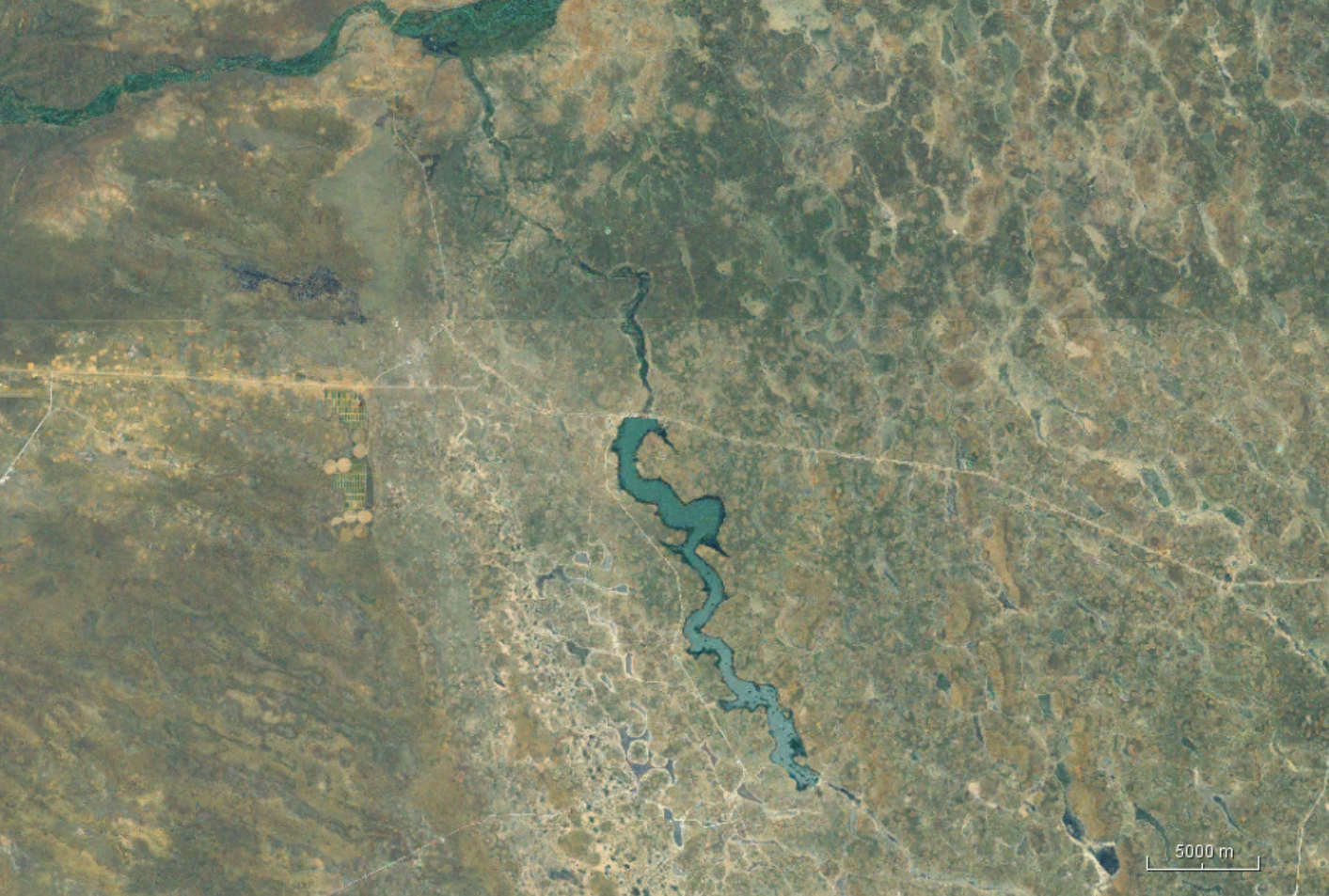
- The Olushandja Dam

- Location in Namibia
- Country: Namibia
- Coordinates: 17.43°S 14.65°E
- Opening date: 1990

Dam and spillways
- Impounds: Etaka River

Reservoir
- Total capacity: 42.331 million cubic metres

Olushandja Dam is a dam on the Etaka River outside of Outapi in the Omusati Region of Namibia. The dam was completed in 1990. Its lake has a maximum capacity of 42.331 million cubic metres, and stores water from the Calueque Dam on the Cunene River in nearby Angola which supports hydroelectricity generation in the Ruacana Power Station downstream.
