= Otjomuru =

Settlement in the Kunene Region, Namibia

Otjomuru is a settlement in the Kunene Region of north-western Namibia, situated c. 27 kilometres (17 mi) east of Okangwati. It belongs to the Epupa electoral constituency. The settlement was founded by Libertina Amathila as a place of resettlement for Ovatue people and Ovatjimba people. It features a primary school that in 2016 had 117 learners.
