= Ruacana Hydroelectric Power Station =

Power station in Namibia

- Location within Namibia
- Country: Namibia
- Location: Ruacana, Omusati Region
- Coordinates: 17°23′56″S 14°13′17″E
- Purpose: Power
- Status: Operational
- Opening date: 1978 & 2012
- Construction cost: ZAR 162 million
- Operator: NamPower

Dam and spillways
- Impounds: Kunene River

Ruacana Power Station
- Turbines: Francis-type; 3 x 85 MW (114,000 hp); 1 x 92 MW (123,000 hp)
- Installed capacity: 347 MW (465,000 hp)

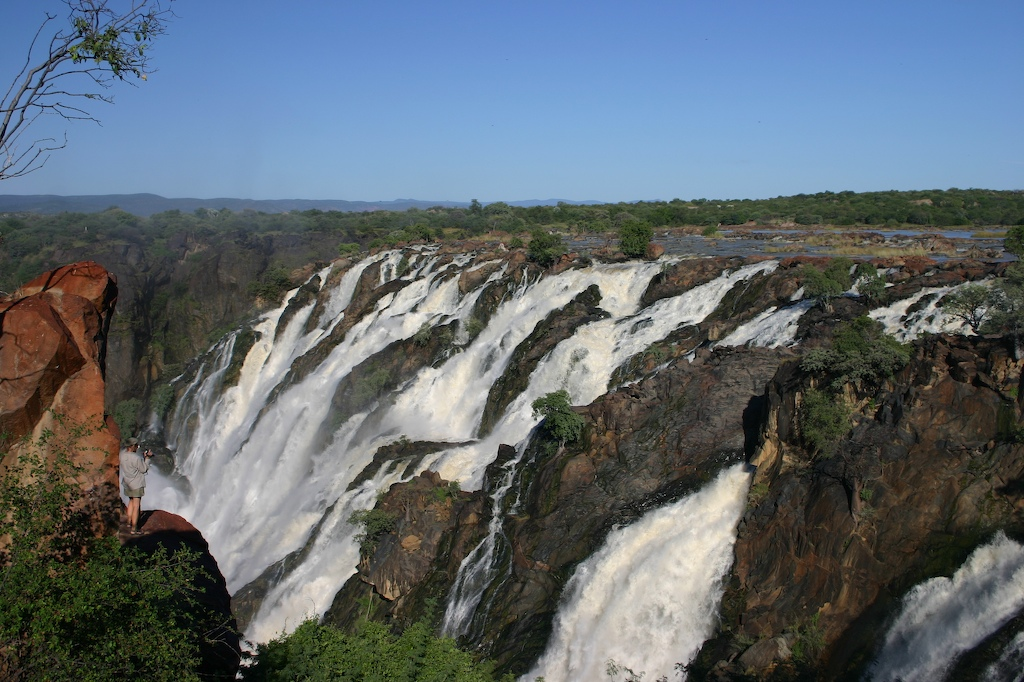
The Ruacana Falls in the Kunene river, seen from the Namibian side.

The Ruacana Hydroelectric Power Station is a hydroelectric power plant across the Kunene River near Ruacana in northwest Namibia, close to the Angolan border. Commissioned in 1978, it is by far the largest power station in Namibia. Its operator is NamPower, the Namibian national electric power utility company.

== Location ==
The power station is located near the town of Ruacana, in the Omusati Region of Namibia, adjacent to the international border with Angola. The power station is situated 757 kilometres (470 mi), by road, northwest of Windhoek, the capital and largest city of Namibia. The power station is operated by NamPower.

== Overview ==
As of May 2020, Ruacana Hydroelectric Power Station is the largest electricity generating station in Namibia. It accounts for approximately 50 percent of the country's generation capacity.

The first three 80 MW Francis turbine-generators were commissioned in 1978. In 2012, the three original turbines were tweaked to generate a maximum of 85 megawatts each. A fourth turbine with 92 megawatts capacity was also installed that year, bringing the station's generation capacity to 347 megawatts (465,335 hp). The fourth Francis turbine-generator was built by Alstom, Andritz Hydro and Concor and commissioned on 5 April 2012. The power station is located underground near the bottom of the falls.

== Water Source ==
Water for the power station is stored in the Calueque Dam approximately 24 kilometres (15 mi) upstream of the Ruacana Falls along the Kunene River in Calueque, Angola. Several dams upstream help regulate the Kunene River to help the power station operate more efficiently. Further upstream is the Gove Dam in west-central Angola, while the Olushandja Dam - on a tributary of the Kunene River, the Etaka River - is in Namibia.

== See also ==
- List of power stations in Namibia
