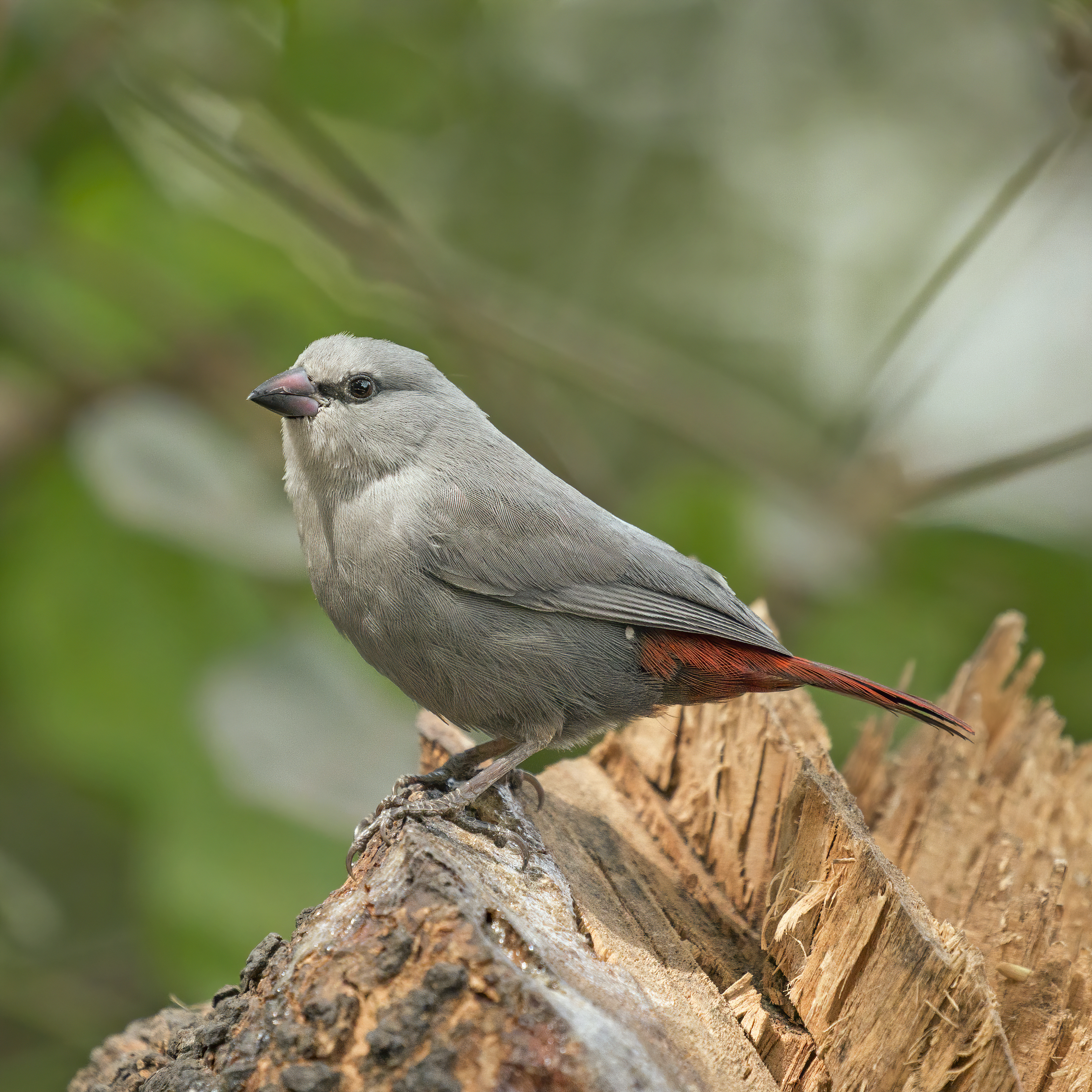
- Gambia

Conservation status
- Least Concern (IUCN 3.1)

Scientific classification
- Kingdom: Animalia
- Phylum: Chordata
- Class: Aves
- Order: Passeriformes
- Family: Estrildidae
- Genus: Glaucestrilda
- Species: G. caerulescens

Binomial name
- Glaucestrilda caerulescens (Vieillot, 1817)

Synonyms
- Estrilda caerulescens Estrilda coerulescens [orth. error on IUCN Red List]

= Lavender waxbill =

Common species of estrildid finch

The lavender waxbill (Glaucestrilda caerulescens) is a common species of estrildid finch native to Central Africa and successfully introduced on Hawaiʻi. It has an estimated global extent of occurrence of 620,000 km^{2} (240,000 sq mi).

== Habitat ==
It is found in subtropical/tropical (lowland) dry shrubland habitats in Benin, Burkina Faso, Cameroon, Central African Republic, Chad, Côte d'Ivoire, Gambia, Ghana, Guinea, Guinea-Bissau, Liberia, Mali, Niger, Nigeria, Senegal, Sudan, Togo and the United States (Hawaii island only). The IUCN has classified the species as being of least concern.
