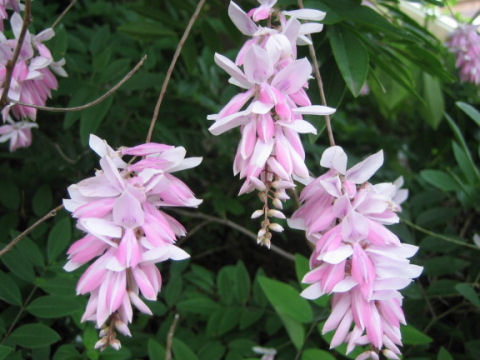
- Abrus precatorius

Scientific classification
- Kingdom: Plantae
- Clade: Tracheophytes
- Clade: Angiosperms
- Clade: Eudicots
- Clade: Rosids
- Order: Fabales
- Family: Fabaceae
- Subfamily: Faboideae
- Clade: Meso-Papilionoideae
- Clade: Non-protein amino acid-accumulating clade
- Clade: Millettioids
- Tribe: Abreae; Hutch.
- Genus: Abrus; Adans. (1763)

Species
- 17; see text

Synonyms
- Hoepfneria Vatke (1879); Hulthemia Blume ex Miq. (1855), nom. inval.; Zaga Raf. (1837)

= Abrus =

Genus of legumes

Abrus is a genus of flowering plants in the pea family, Fabaceae, and the only genus in the tribe Abreae. It contains 13–18 species, but is best known for a single species: jequirity (A. precatorius). The highly toxic seeds of that species are used to make jewellery.

Species range naturally across tropical Africa, Madagascar, the Arabian Peninsula, south and southeast Asia, southern China, New Guinea, and Australia. Some species have been introduced to the tropical Americas.

== Species ==
- Abrus aureus R.Vig. (Madagascar)
- Abrus baladensis Thulin (Somalia)
- Abrus bottae Deflers (Saudi Arabia, Yemen)
- Abrus canescens Welw. ex Baker (Africa)
- Abrus cantoniensis Hance (China)
- Abrus diversifoliatus Breteler (Madagascar)
- Abrus fruticulosus Wall. ex Wight & Arn. (India)
- Abrus gawenensis Thulin (Somalia)
- Abrus kaokoensis Swanepoel & Kolberg (Namibia)
- Abrus laevigatus E.Mey. (Southern Africa)
- Abrus longibracteatus Labat (Laos, Vietnam)
- Abrus madagascariensis R.Vig. (Madagascar)
- Abrus melanospermus Hassk. (Tropical & Subtropical Asia to SW. Pacific)
- Abrus parvifolius (R.Vig.) Verdc. (Madagascar)
- Abrus precatorius L. - Jequirity (Africa, Australia, Southeast Asia)
- Abrus pulchellus Wall. ex Voigt (Africa)
- Abrus sambiranensis R.Vig. (Madagascar)
- Abrus schimperi Hochst. ex Baker (Africa)
- Abrus somalensis Taub. (Somalia)
- Abrus wittei Baker f. (Zaire)

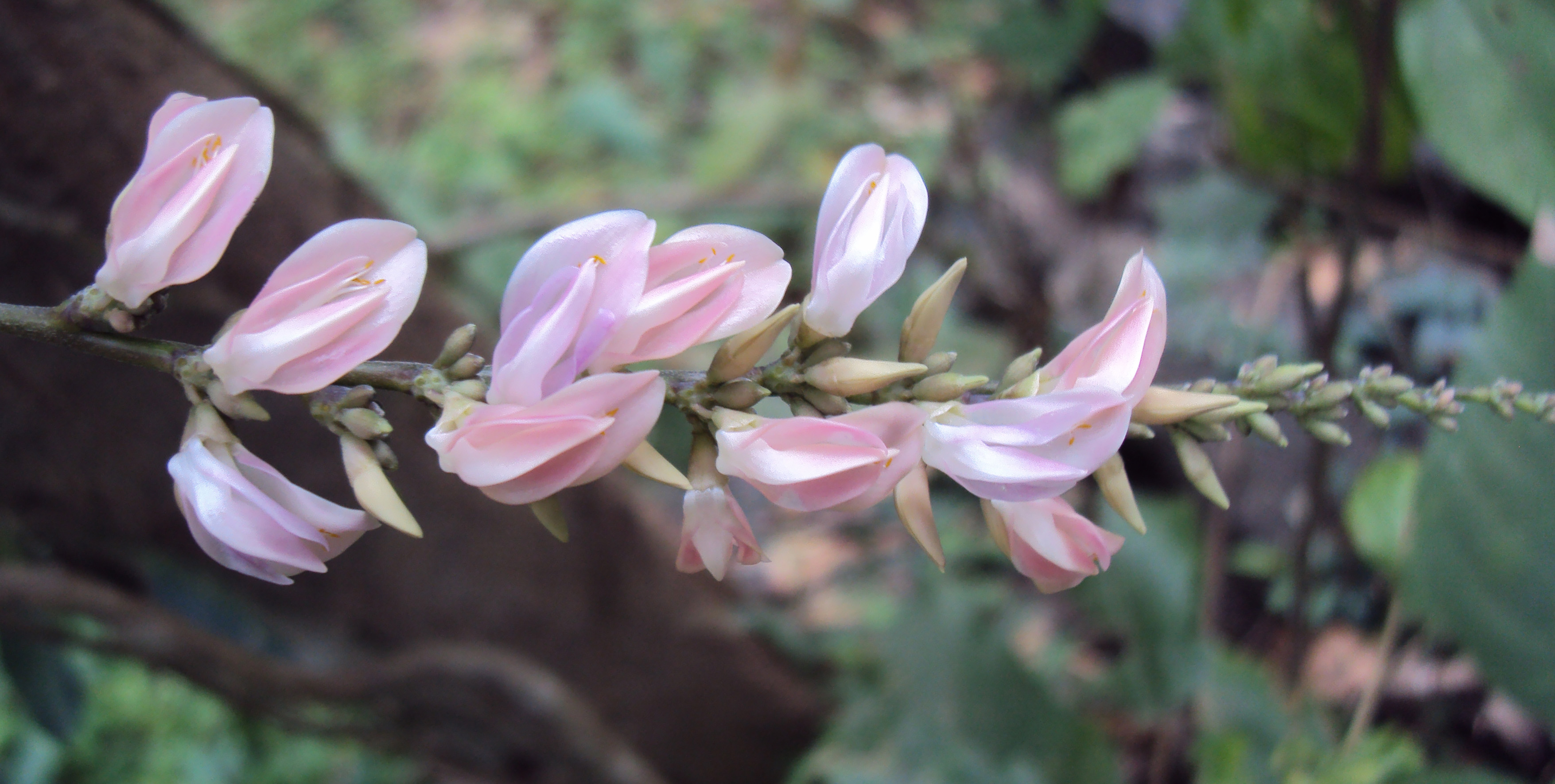
Abrus pulchellus
