= Abrus canescens =

Scientific classification
- Kingdom: Plantae
- Clade: Embryophytes
- Clade: Tracheophytes
- Clade: Spermatophytes
- Clade: Angiosperms
- Clade: Eudicots
- Clade: Rosids
- Order: Fabales
- Family: Fabaceae
- Subfamily: Faboideae
- Genus: Abrus
- Species: A. canescens

Binomial name
- Abrus canescens Welw. ex Baker

Species of legume

Abrus canescens is a species of flowering plant belonging to the legume family, native to Africa. It is considered almost extinct.

== Description ==
The plant's stem is brown and its leaves are a rusty brown to silvery colour with trichomes on the top and bottom. Both the stem and leaves are described as "very pubescent". It has between 7-13 pairs of leaflets measuring from 0.60 – 2.30 cm in length and 0.30 – 0.90 cm in breadth. The leaflets are a narrow oblong shape with all but the last pair having a smooth, round apex and an obtuse to round base. The flowers are purple. The fruit consists of between 1 and 6 flat, straight, brown pods measuring 3.20 - 6.00 cm in length and 0.40 - 1.40 cm in breadth. The seeds are smooth, flat and black in colour.
