= Pongamiopsis viguieri =

Conservation status
- Vulnerable (IUCN 3.1)

Scientific classification
- Kingdom: Plantae
- Clade: Tracheophytes
- Clade: Angiosperms
- Clade: Eudicots
- Clade: Rosids
- Order: Fabales
- Family: Fabaceae
- Subfamily: Faboideae
- Genus: Pongamiopsis
- Species: P. viguieri

Binomial name
- Pongamiopsis viguieri Du Puy & Labat

Species of legume

Pongamiopsis viguieri is a species of legume in the family Fabaceae. It is found only in Madagascar.
