= Epupa Falls =

Series of waterfalls in Namibia

Coordinates: 17°00′S 13°15′E

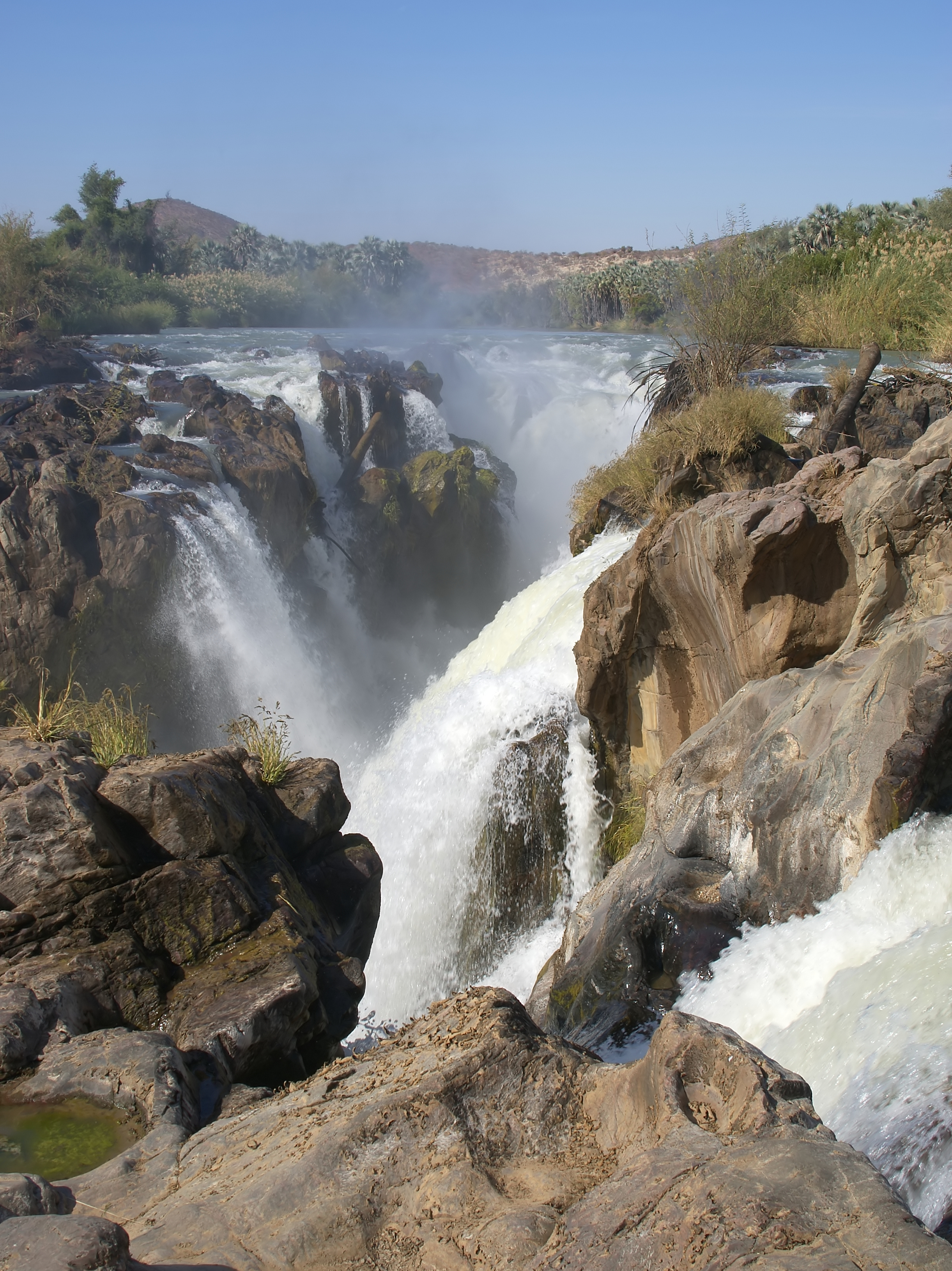
Epupa Falls

Epupa Falls (also known as Monte Negro Falls in Angola) is a series of large waterfalls formed by the Cunene River on the border of Angola and Namibia, in the Kaokoland area of the Kunene Region. The river is about 0.5 kilometres (1,600 ft) wide in this area and drops in a series of waterfalls across a length of 1.5 kilometres (0.93 mi), with the greatest single drop being 37 metres (121 ft). The settlement near the falls is also called Epupa.

== Toponymy ==
The name "Epupa" is a Herero word for "foam", about the foam created by the falling water. The Epupa Constituency is named for the falls.

== Ecology ==
Due to the specialised nature of this steep riparian habitat, the Epupa Falls are the locus of endemism for several fish and other aquatic species.

== Access ==
Despite being difficult to reach (a four-wheel drive vehicle is recommended to reach them from Opuwo), the falls are a major visitor attraction in Namibia because of the largely unspoiled environment, with fig trees, baobabs, makalani palms, and colourful rock walls framing the falls.

The Ruacana Falls in northern Namibia are located 135 kilometres (84 mi) upstream, also on the Cunene River. There are four lodges accommodating visitors to the area, namely Kapika Waterfall Lodge, Omarunga Camp Lodge, Epupa Camp Lodge, and Epupa Falls Campsite Lodge. All these lodges have campsites except Kapika Waterfall Lodge. An alternative accommodation option is the Motjikutu Epupa campsite, which is a community-owned campsite.

Activities in the area range from guided tours to the falls and Himba villages around Epupa Falls, birdwatching, excursions to see crocodiles, and a variety of vegetation featuring trees like baobab and Mopane trees, the dominant species in the area. Tourists are also offered whitewater rafting at Epupa Camp.

=== People ===
Epupa Falls is known for the semi-nomadic Ovahimba people who live there, as well as other tribes like the Ovatjimba, Ovazemba, and Ovatwa people. Migration to Epupa Falls is constantly increasing due to high tourism growth, which encourages tribes of Herero- and Ovambo-speaking peoples to move to the area.

== In the media ==
Epupa Falls are shown in the 2011 non-narrative documentary film Samsara.

Epupa Falls is featured in the 8th episode of the first season of The Grand Tour, being the termination point of a journey in beach buggies through Namibia.

== See also ==
- List of waterfalls

== Sources ==
- C.Michael Hogan. 2012. Kunene River. eds. P.Saundry & C.Cleveland. Encyclopedia of Earth. National Council for Science and the Environment. Washington DC.
