= Gove Dam =

Dam in Huambo, Huambo Province, Angola

- Location within Angola
- Country: Angola
- Location: Huambo, Huambo Province
- Coordinates: 13°27′4.23″S 15°52′6.01″E
- Purpose: Power, flood control
- Status: Operational
- Construction began: 1969
- Opening date: 1975; 51 years ago

Dam and spillways
- Type of dam: Embankment, earth and rock-fill
- Impounds: Kunene River
- Height: 58 m (190 ft)
- Length: 1,112 m (3,648 ft)
- Dam volume: 4×10^{6} m^{3} (140×10^{6} cu ft)

Reservoir
- Total capacity: 2,547×10^{6} m^{3} (2,065,000 acre⋅ft)
- Catchment area: 4,667 km^{2} (1,802 sq mi)

Power Station
- Commission date: 2012
- Type: Conventional
- Turbines: 3 x 20 MW (27,000 hp) Francis-type
- Installed capacity: 60 MW (80,000 hp)

The Gove Dam is an embankment dam on the Kunene River about 75 km (47 mi) south of Huambo in Huambo Province, Angola. The purpose of the dam is to control floods and generate hydroelectric power. It has a power generating capacity of 60 megawatts (80,000 hp) each) (three turbines of 20 megawatts (27,000 hp) each), enough to power over 30,000 homes.

== History ==
The Gove Dam cost US$279 million and was built by Brazilian construction group Odebrecht. It was formally inaugurated in August 2012 by the Angolan President. The dam produces power for the cities of Caála, Huambo, and Kuito.

Construction of the dam began in 1969 and it was completed in 1975. Construction of the power station was halted twice, from 1975 to 1983 due to the civil war, then again from 1986 to 2001 also due to fighting. The dam was partially destroyed by dynamite in 1990. Along with the power station, sub-stations at Caála, Dango, and Benfica (in Huambo) were inaugurated at the time of completion. The sub-stations and distribution network cost US$80 million.

== See also ==
- Ruacana Power Station – downstream in Namibia, built in conjunction with the Gove Dam
