= Abrus melanospermus =

Scientific classification
- Kingdom: Plantae
- Clade: Tracheophytes
- Clade: Angiosperms
- Clade: Eudicots
- Clade: Rosids
- Order: Fabales
- Family: Fabaceae
- Subfamily: Faboideae
- Genus: Abrus
- Species: A. melanospermus

Binomial name
- Abrus melanospermus Hassk

Synonyms
- Abrus gorsei; Abrus repens; Abrus suffruticosus

Species of flowering plant in the bean family Fabaceae

Abrus melanospermus is a species of flowering plant in the family Fabaceae. It is native to Africa and Asia. It was also introduced to South America.

== Ecology ==
The species has an ecology in Miombo and sand woodlands in Kalahari.

== Habitat ==
The plant grows in semi-evergreen and moist deciduous forests, and also in the plains.

== Distribution ==
The species is native to Angola, Bangladesh, Benin, Burkina Faso, Burundi, Cambodia, Cameroon, Central African Republic, Chad, China, Republic of the Congo, Democratic Republic of the Congo, East Himalaya, Equatorial Guinea, Ethiopia, Ghana, Guinea, Guinea-Bissau, India, Kenya, Laos, Liberia, Madagascar, Malawi, Malaysia, Mali, Mozambique, Myanmar, Nepal, Papua New Guinea, Nigeria, Philippines, Senegal, Sierra Leone, Sri Lanka, Sudan, Tanzania, Thailand, Togo, Uganda, Vietnam, Zambia.

== Taxonomy ==
It has three accepted infraspecifics:

- Abrus melanospermus subsp. melanospermus occurs in Bangladesh, Cambodia, China, India, Laos, Malaysia, Myanmar, Nepal, Philippines, Sri Lanka, Thailand, and Vietnam.
- Abrus melanospermus subsp. tenuiflorus is native in 20+ African countries, and has been introduced into Bolivia, Brazil, Colombia and Venezuela.
- Abrus melanospermus subsp. suffruticosus is native in Angola, Burundi, Central African Republic, Chad, DR Congo, Congo Republic, Guinea-Bissau, Malawi, Mozambique, Nigeria, Senegal, Sierra Leone, Tanzania, Zambia and Zaïre.
