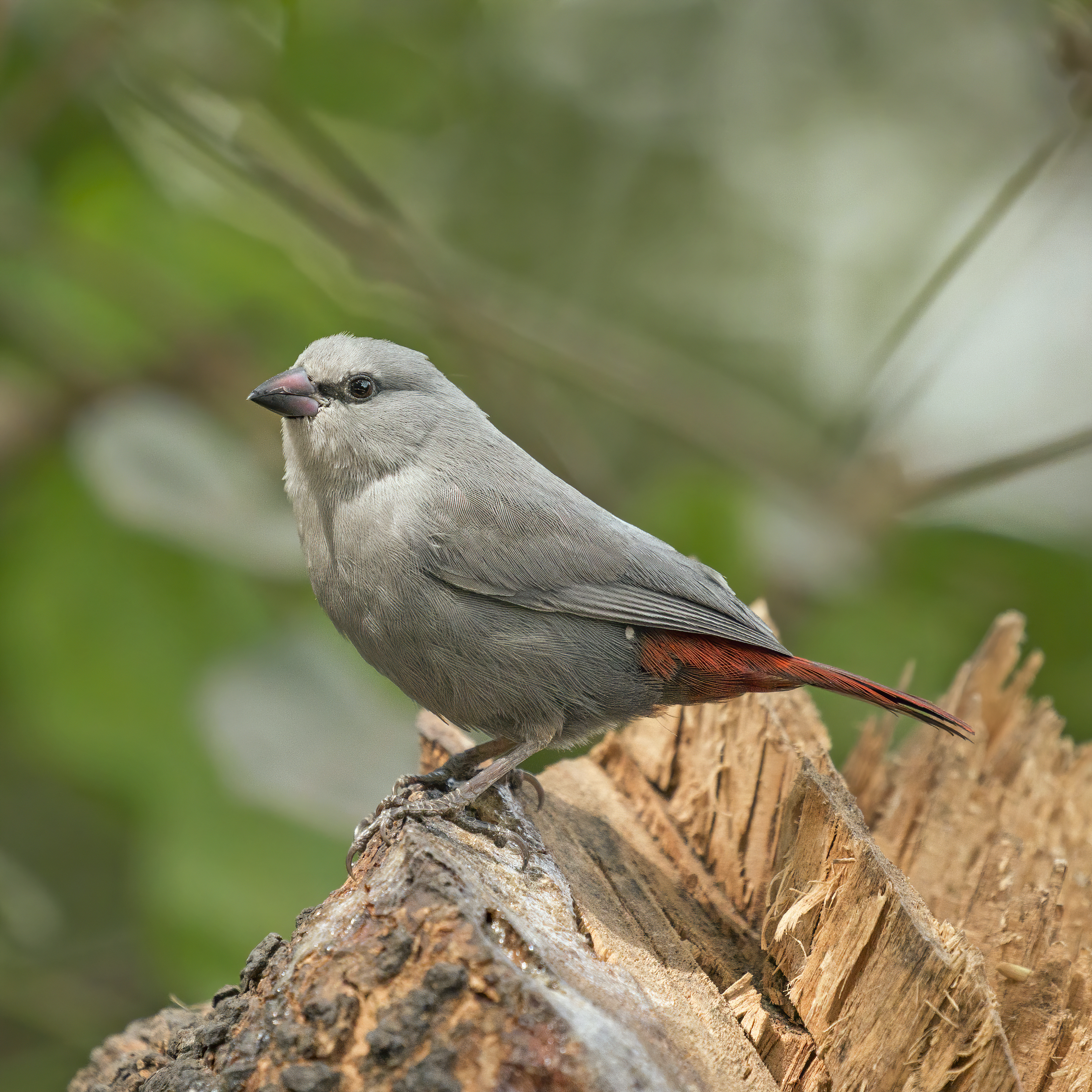
- Lavender waxbill (Glaucestrilda caerulescens)

Scientific classification
- Kingdom: Animalia
- Phylum: Chordata
- Class: Aves
- Order: Passeriformes
- Family: Estrildidae
- Genus: Glaucestrilda; Roberts, 1922

Type species
- Estrilda incana Grey waxbill Sundevall, 1850

= Glaucestrilda =

Subgenus of finch in the Estrildidae family

Glaucestrilda is a genus of estrildid finch in the family Estrildidae. The three species in the genus are found in Africa.

== Taxonomy ==
The genus Glaucestrilda was introduced in 1922 by the South African zoologist Austin Roberts with Estrilda incana Sundevall as the type species. This taxon is now treated as a subspecies of the grey waxbill with the trinomial name Glaucestrilda perreini incana. The genus name combines the Ancient Greek γλαυκος/glaukos meaning "blue-grey", "glaucous" or "silvery" with the genus name Estrilda that had been introduced in 1827 by William Swainson for the waxbills.

== Species ==
The genus contains the following three species:

Genus Glaucestrilda – Sundevall, 1850 – three species
Common name	Scientific name and subspecies	Range	Size and ecology	IUCN status and estimated population
Lavender waxbill	Glaucestrilda caerulescens (Vieillot, 1817)	Benin, Burkina Faso, Cameroon, Central African Republic, Chad, Côte d'Ivoire, Gambia, Ghana, Guinea, Guinea-Bissau, Liberia, Mali, Niger, Nigeria, Senegal, Sudan, Togo	Size: Habitat: Diet:	LC
Grey waxbill	Glaucestrilda perreini (Vieillot, 1817) Two subspecies: G. p. perreini (Vieillot, 1817); G. p. incana (Sundevall, 1850)	Angola, the Republic of Congo, the Democratic Republic of the Congo, Gabon, Malawi, Mozambique, South Africa, Swaziland, Tanzania, Zambia & Zimbabwe.	Size: Habitat: Diet:	LC
Cinderella waxbill	Glaucestrilda thomensis (Sousa, 1888)	southwestern Angola around Namibe Province, north and east to southwest Huila Province and north to Fazenda do Cuito in Huambo and extreme northwestern Namibia.	Size: Habitat: Diet:	LC

== See also ==
- Birds of Africa
- Estrildidae genera
