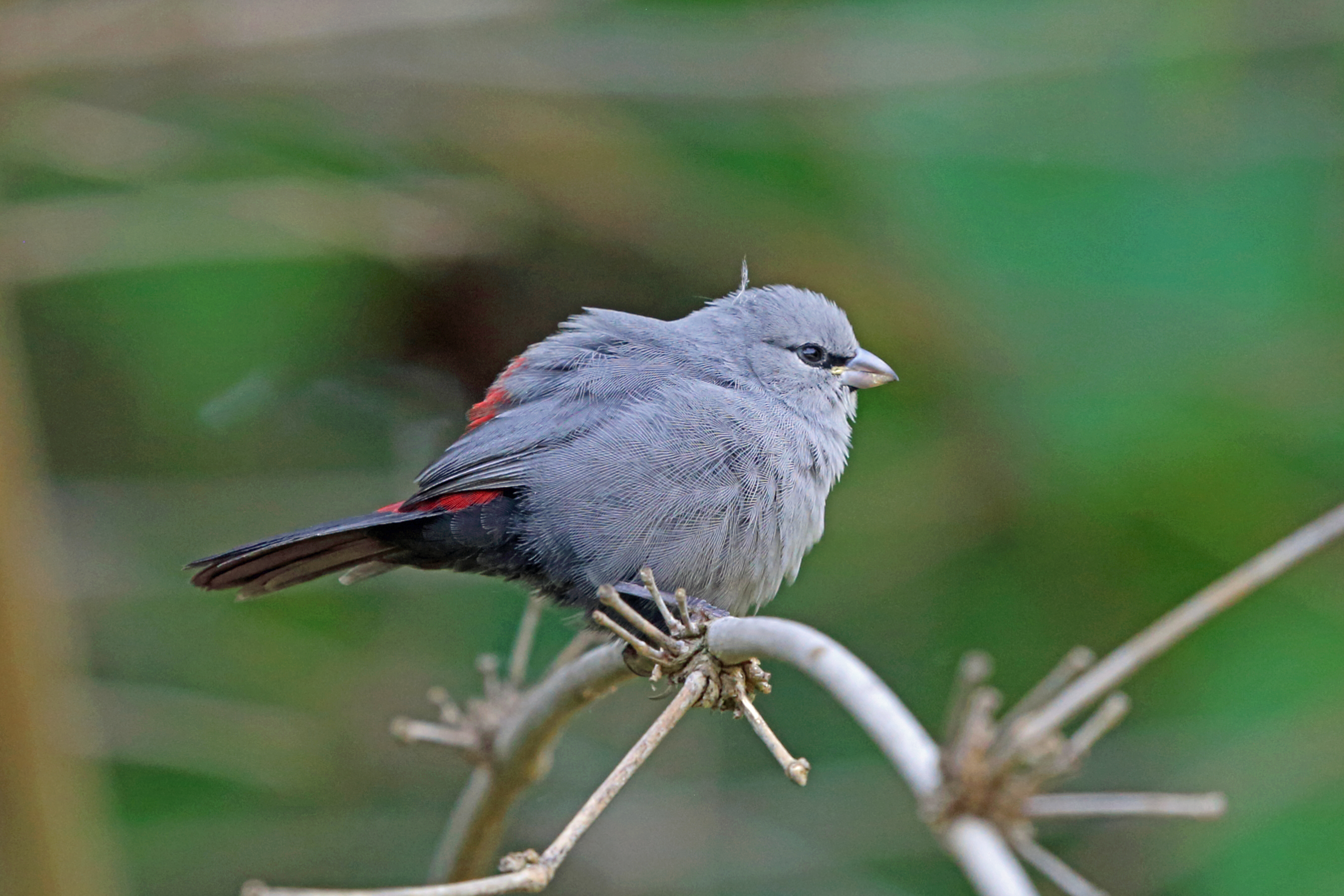

Conservation status
- Least Concern (IUCN 3.1)

Scientific classification
- Kingdom: Animalia
- Phylum: Chordata
- Class: Aves
- Order: Passeriformes
- Family: Estrildidae
- Genus: Glaucestrilda
- Species: G. perreini

Binomial name
- Glaucestrilda perreini (Vieillot, 1817)

Synonyms
- Estrilda perreini

= Grey waxbill =

Black-tailed waxbill

Species of bird

The grey waxbill or black-tailed waxbill (Glaucestrilda perreini) is a common species of estrildid finch found in wetter land of Southern Africa. It has an estimated global extent of occurrence of 670,000 km^{2} (260,000 sq mi).

Two subspecies are recognised:

- G. p. perreini (Vieillot, 1817) – Gabon to north Angola and east to south Tanzania
- G. p. incana (Sundevall, 1850) – south Malawi and Mozambique to east South Africa

== Habitat ==
It is found in subtropical/ tropical (lowland) moist shrubland habitats in Angola, the Republic of Congo, the Democratic Republic of the Congo, Eswatini, Gabon, Malawi, Mozambique, South Africa, Tanzania, Zambia & Zimbabwe. The status of the species is evaluated as Least Concern.
