= Opuwo Airport =

Airport in Namibia

- IATA: OPW; ICAO: FYOP

Summary
- Serves: Opuwo
- Elevation AMSL: 3,770 ft / 1,150 m
- Coordinates: 18°03′20″S 13°51′10″E

Map
- Location of the airport in Namibia

Runways
Direction	Length		Surface
Direction	m	ft	Surface
03/21	2,335	7,661	Asphalt
09/27	780	2,559	Gravel
- Source: Google Maps GCM

Opuwo Airport (IATA: OPW, ICAO: FYOP) is an airport serving Opuwo, Namibia.

The Opuwo non-directional beacon (Ident: OP) is located 1 kilometre (0.62 mi) west of Rwy 03/21 mid-field.

== See also ==
- List of airports in Namibia
- Transport in Namibia
