= 37 Battalion (SWATF) =

37/102 Battalion
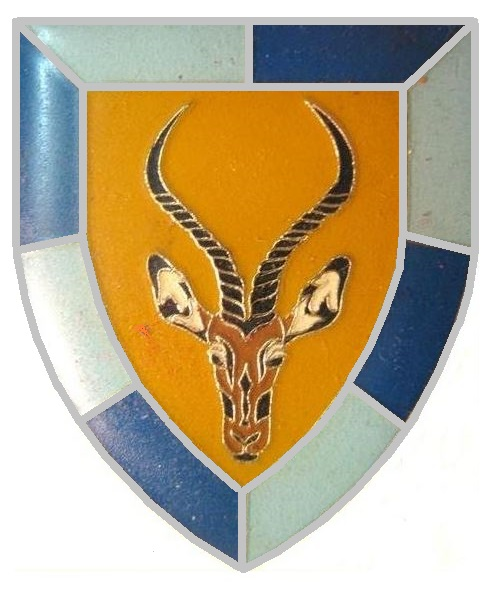
- SWATF 37 Battalion emblem
- Active: 1978
- Country: Namibia, South Africa
- Allegiance: South Africa
- Branch: South African Army,
- Type: Infantry
- Part of: South West African Territorial Force
- Garrison/HQ: Opuwo
- Equipment: Casspir

Insignia
- Part of the South West African Territorial Force

102 Battalion (pronounced as one-o-two Battalion) was a quick-reaction unit of the South West African Territorial Force. The battalion lost 36 men.

== History ==
=== Origin ===
This unit was formed in 1976 as the Kaokoland Company with 4 men. In 1978 limited recruitment of military personnel commenced and low level defensive operations in the form of patrols are undertaken. The first confirmed infiltration of SWAPO happens in 1979 and the need to establish a more offensive force is recognized and in 1980 recruitment intensifies as does training of the recruits.

=== Renaming ===
The South West Africa Territory Force SWATF renumbered battalion numbers according to their geographical positioning on the border. The prefix 10 pertained to battalions operation to the west of the Kavango River, 20 to the Kavango or central region and 70 to the eastern region. Under this system in 1981 the unit's name is changed from Kaokoland Company 37BATTALION to 102 Battalion (January 1981) and it is placed under the command of Sector 10, Oshakati.

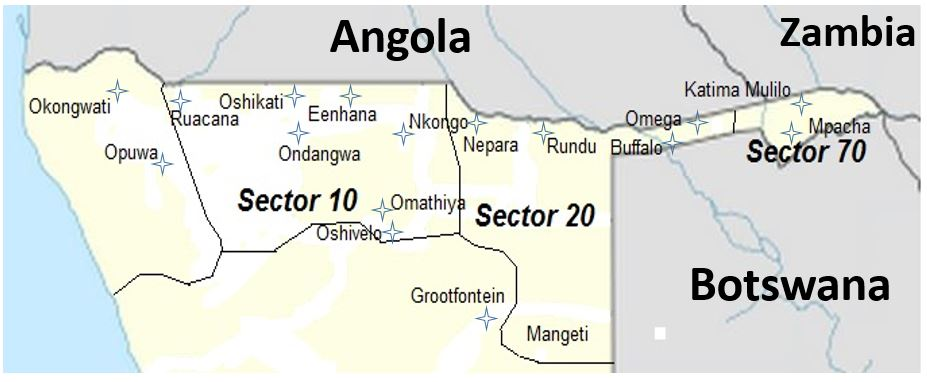
SWATF Northern Sector Map

=== Structure ===
By 1985, it had 900 plus men in 3 rifle companies based at Opuwo, Okongwati, Ondorrorundu and Sodoliet.

=== External Operations ===
- Operation Protea, 1981, one company
- Operation Operation Askari, 1983
- Operation Excite
- Operation Merlyn, 1989

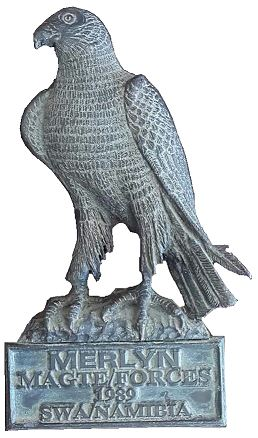
Sector 10 response to the Cuban buildup and SWAPO incursions, known as the Merlyn Forces in 1989 South West Africa

== See also ==
- Namibian War of Independence
- South African Border War
