= Baynes Mountains =

Mountain range in Namibia

Coordinates: 17°12′S 12°40′E

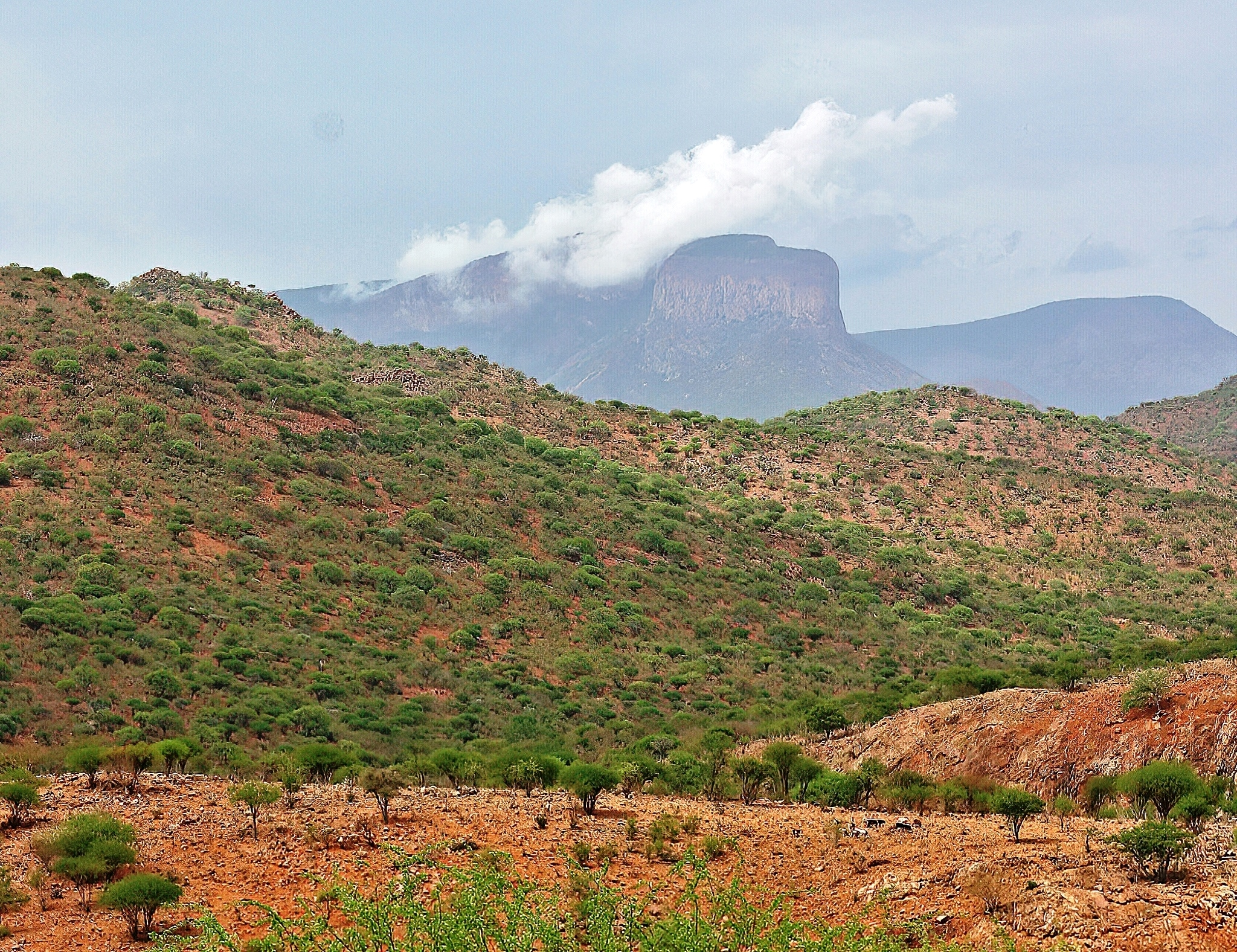
Escarpment and foothills of the Baynes Mountains

The Baynes Mountains are a mountain range in northern Namibia.

== Description ==
The Baynes Mountains form an escarpment plateau in Kunene Region in northwest Namibia, near the border with Angola (formed here by the Kunene River). The mountains range in altitude from 700–2,000 metres (2,000–7,000 ft). The Baynes are of quartz sandstone and have steep cliffs and gorges. The Baynes Gorge is where the Kunene River passes the Zebra and Baynes Mountains before entering the Namib Desert. Annual rainfall in the Baynes is about 200 mm (8 in).

== Flora ==
Baynes Mountains flora include Abrus kaokoensis, Baynesia lophophora and Euphorbia ohiva.
