= Okanguati =

Okanguati (also: Okangwati) is a settlement in the Epupa Constituency in the Kunene Region in northwestern Namibia. It is situated about 110 kilometres north of the regional capital Opuwo on the banks of the Omuhongo River.

There is a health centre, a police station and the Okanguati Combined School on site.
