= Epupa Constituency =

Electoral constituency in the Kunene region of north-western Namibia

Epupa constituency (red) in the Kunene Region of Namibia

Epupa Constituency (until 1998: Ruacana Constituency) is a constituency in the Kunene Region of Namibia. The constituency contains the Epupa Falls after which it is named (from Otjiherero: Epupa = falling waters), located on the Angolan-Namibian border. Its population in 2004 was 12,816. In 2020 it had 12,182 registered voters.

== Establishment and location ==
The constituency was created in 1992 under the name Ruacana Constituency. Its western border is the shoreline of the Atlantic Ocean, its northern border is the middle of the Kunene River, at the same time Namibia's border with Angola. The constituency extended eastwards to what is today Onesi Constituency in Omusati Region, and southwards to the 18° S circle of latitude. Both the town of Ruacana and the Ruacana Falls belonged to the constituency at that time.

In 1998 the constituency's eastern part, including Ruacana, was moved to Omusati Region where the current Ruacana Constituency was created. The remainder of the constituency was named Epupa Constituency.

The settlements Epupa, Otjomuru, Ohamaremba and Okangwati belong to the Epupa constituency.

== Politics ==
The 2004 regional election were won by Jonna Kasita Mburura of the Democratic Turnhalle Alliance (DTA) with 1,964 of the 3,712 votes cast.

The 2015 regional election were won by Nguzu Muharukua of the DTA with 3,672 votes, closely followed by Jona Kakondo of the SWAPO Party with 3,260 votes. Erwin Muharukua of the Rally for Democracy and Progress (RDP) also ran and gained 52 votes. Epupa was one of only two constituencies won by the DTA in this election. The 2020 regional election was won by Tjimutambo Kuuoko of the Popular Democratic Movement (PDM, the new name of the DTA). He obtained 4,373 votes, followed by Masatu Thom (SWAPO) with 2,899 votes.
