= Calueque =

Town in Kunene Province, Angola

- Town
- Calueque
- Coordinates: 17°16′57″S 14°32′5″E
- Country: Angola
- Province: Kunene Province

Calueque is a town next to a dam and pumping station of the same name on the Kunene River in the Kunene Province of southern Angola. The water project is linked to Ruacana, 20 km (12 mi) away in Namibia, where the Ruacana Power Station is. This dam is one of the last landmarks along the Kunene River, prior to the Kunene becoming a border feature between Angola and Namibia. A 300 km (190 mi) pipeline and canal extends across the border into Namibia, supplying towns as far away as Oshakati in Ovamboland with water. The dam was completed in 1976. However, due to the onset of the Angolan civil war following independence, the full master plan for the scheme was not realised by the South African and Portuguese governments.

== Angolan Civil War ==
The area was of considerable strategic importance, providing the pretext for the initial 1975 South African military intervention in the Angolan Civil War when staff at the facility were threatened by guerrillas. Full intervention through the SADF's Operation Savannah followed shortly afterwards.

Throughout the Angolan Civil war Calueque remained continuously occupied by South African forces. In 1988, during the Battle of Cuito Cuanavale, the Cubans opened a second front against the South Africans and launched a massive ground offensive in the direction of Calueque. The area to the north of the dam became the scene of bloody fighting which proved to be a turning point in the war. On 27 June 1988, Cuban MiG-23 fighters attacked the facilities. The first wave of aircraft bombed the bridge and sluice gates, killing South African soldiers in the process. Another wave bombed the pumps and generator, while a third destroyed the pipeline to Ovamboland. Significantly, one of the last bombs hit the position of South African soldiers nearby who had exited their Buffel troop carrier to watch the events unfold. The dam and pipelines were considerably damaged, rendering the scheme inoperable. The South Africans (SWATF, A Coy, 701Bn) were the last to leave, retreating over the bridge back into SWA on 29 June, after blowing up the ramparts that were built at the dam wall.

Whilst the Calueque Dam and bridge were neglected since the bombing of 1988, the Angolan Government in April 2012 signed a US$225 million contract for the rehabilitation of the dam wall, the construction of two hydro plants, a new channel and 21 irrigation pivots. The project was awarded to Mota-Engil and Lyon and is scheduled to take 25 months.
