= Ruacana Falls =

Waterfall in Namibia

Coordinates: 17°23′37″S 14°13′1″E

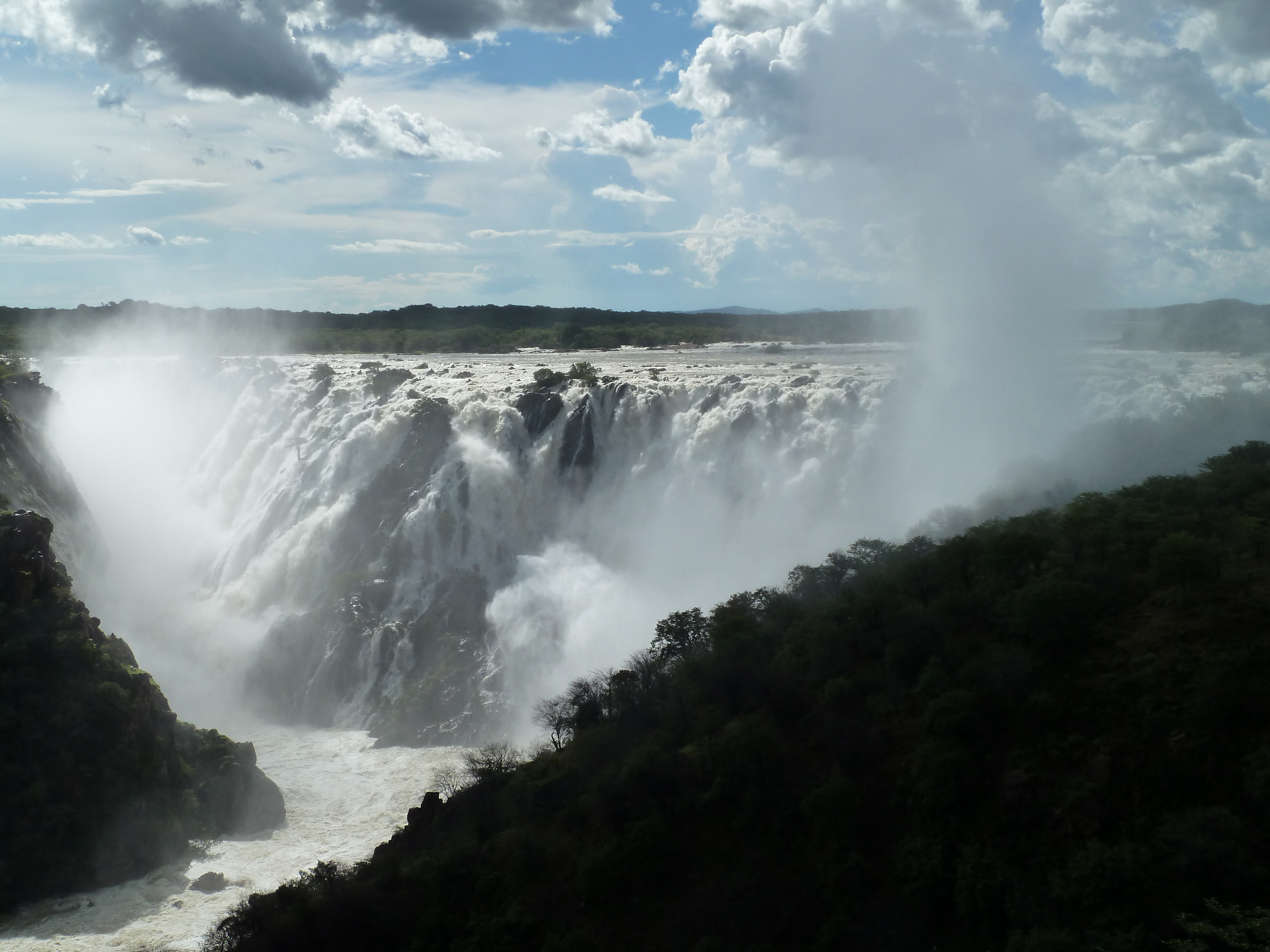
- Ruacana Falls
- Location: Ruacana, Northern Namibia

Ruacana Falls is a waterfall located in Ruacana, Omusati on the Kunene River in Northern Namibia. The waterfall is 120 meters (390 ft) high and 700 meters (2,300 ft) wide in full flood. It is among the largest waterfalls in Africa, both by volume and width.

== Description ==
The Ruacana Falls is formed by the 1,050 km (650 mi) long Kunene River, which marks part of the border between Namibia and Angola, plunging into a 120 metre deep and 700 metre wide gorge.

== Etymology ==
The name Ruacana comes from the phrase orua hakahana (literally "the rushing of the water") from the local Otjiherero language.

== See also ==
- List of waterfalls
