= Opuwo =

Town in Kunene Region, Namibia

Opuwo Otjihinamaparero Ohopoho
- Town
- Town of Opuwo
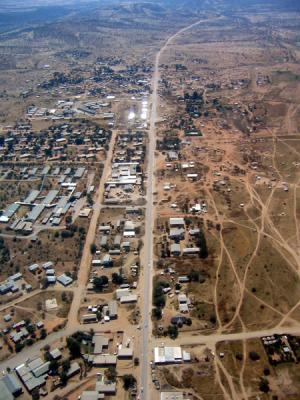
- aerial view of Opuwo

- Location in Namibia
- Coordinates: 18°3′20″S 13°50′26″E
- Country: Namibia
- Region: Kunene Region
- Constituency: Opuwo

Area
  - Total: 3.82 sq mi (9.89 km^{2})

Population (2023 census)
  - Total: 12,331
  - Density: 3,230/sq mi (1,250/km^{2})
- Time zone: UTC+2 (SAST)
- Area code: 065
- Climate: BWh

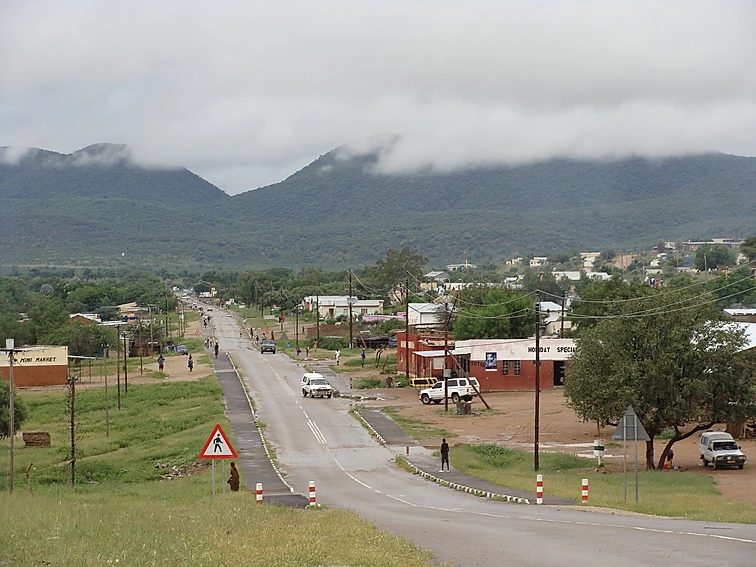

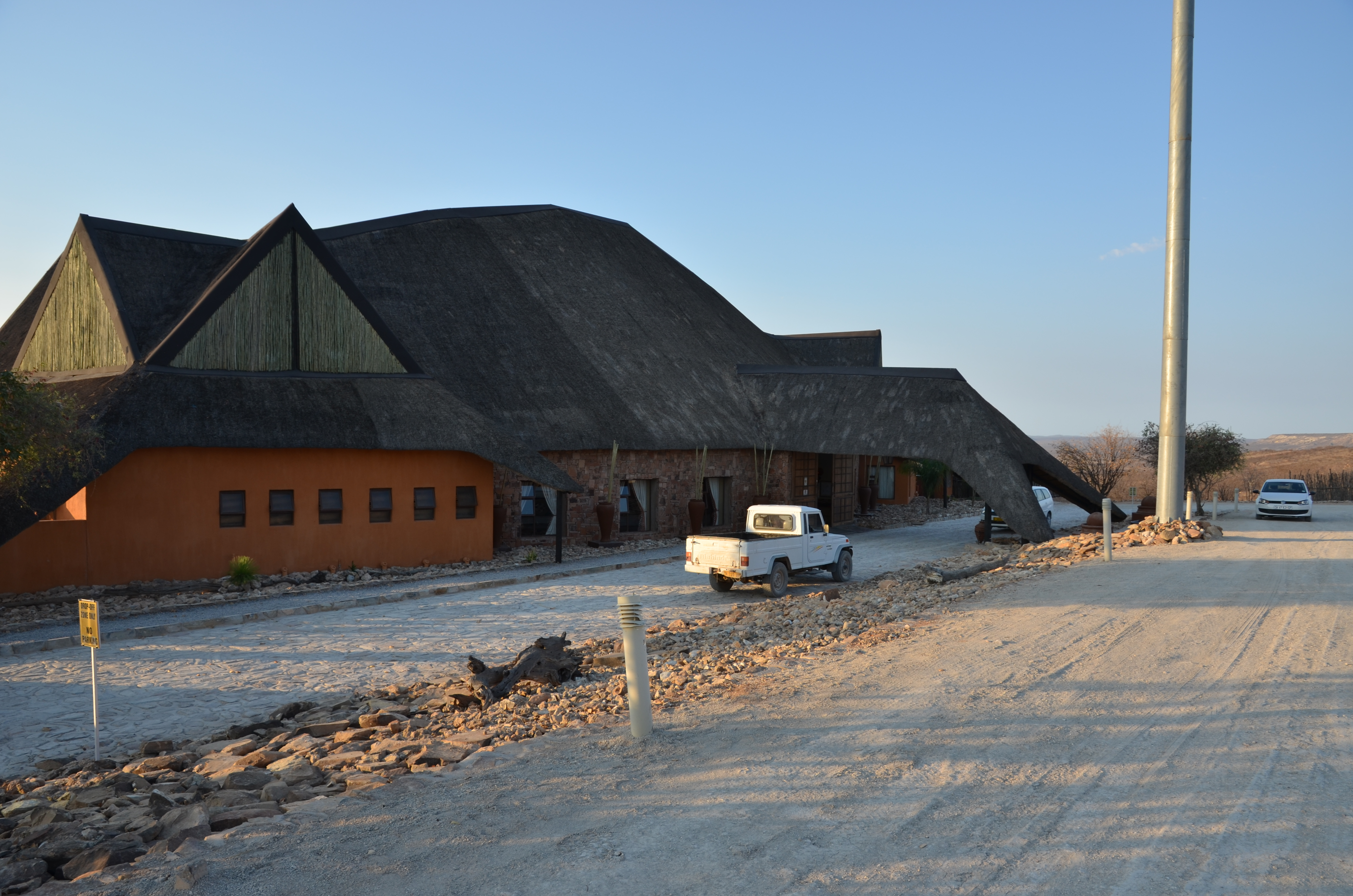
Opuwo Country Lodge

Opuwo is the capital of the Kunene Region in north-western Namibia. The town is situated about 720 km north-northwest of the capital Windhoek, and had a population of around 12,300 in 2023. It is the commercial hub of the Kunene Region.

== Economy and infrastructure ==
Opuwo is situated at the intersection of the C41 and C43. There is a small airfield in town, the Opuwo Airport.

Putuavanga Senior Secondary School in town is among the best government schools in the Kunene Region. There is also the Opuwo Primary School with 39 teachers and 1,200 learners.

The following organizations and offices are situated in the town: Opuwo Police Station, Opuwo District Hospital, Ministry of Home Affairs (Department of Civic Affairs / Regional Civic Registration Office / Kunene Region), and Opuwo Department of Works. There is a Christian church.

== Politics ==
Opuwo is governed by a town council that has seven seats.

=== Electoral history ===
2020 local authority election
Party	Votes	Seats
Popular Democratic Movement	1376	4
SWAPO	1127	3
National Unity Democratic Organisation	128	0
Independent Patriots for Change	120	0
Rally for Democracy and Progress	46	0
Namibian Economic Freedom Fighters	15	0

2015 local authority election
Party	Votes	Seats
Democratic Turnhalle Alliance	1504	3
National Unity Democratic Organisation	155	0
Rally for Democracy and Progress	44	0

2004 local authority election
Party	Votes	Seats
Democratic Turnhalle Alliance	538	2
Congress of Democrats	396	2
National Unity Democratic Organisation	259	1

The first local election run after Namibian independence, the 1992 local elections, was won by SWAPO which obtained 703 votes and gained four seats. The Democratic Turnhalle Alliance (DTA) came second with 575 votes and three seats. The 1998 local authority elections saw a similar result. DTA won with 369 votes and gained four seats, followed by SWAPO with 260 votes and two seats. The remaining seat went to the Democratic Coalition of Namibia (DCN, 69 votes).

Mayors
Name	Term	Party
Uaurikua Kakuva	June 2004 – 2010	DTA
Pieter de Villiers	June 2006-?	CoD
Tuarungua Kavari	2010-15	SWAPO
Albert Tjiuma	December 2015 - December 2020	SWAPO
Rosa Mbinge-Tjeundo	December 2020 - Current	PDM

== History ==
Historical population
Year	Pop.	±% p.a.
2001	5,101	—
2011	7,657	+4.15%
2023	12,331	+4.05%

=== Etymology ===
The name Opuwo was given in the 1920s by the commissioner of Ondangwa, Carl Hugo Linsingen Hahn, the grandson of Carl Hugo Hahn, who came in search of land to build an office. Upon his arrival, he asked the local headman to give him land where he could build an office. The headman gave him a small plot, and when the headman tried to give him more land, Hahn responded, saying, "Ohopoho (it’s enough for me). I don't want any more land". The word Ohopoho was changed to Opuwo in 1974 due to orthographic reform. The residents of Opuwo called it Otjihinamaparero at the time, and some still call it that.

=== Colonial administration ===
The first office to be established in the Kaokoland area was the colonial administrative office in Swartbooisdrift on the banks of the Kunene River. This was the administrative centre of the area from 1925 to 1939. Afterwards, administrative control of the area shifted to Ohopoho, later called Opuwo.

The police station in Swartbooisdrift was run by Sergeant Herbert, and he aimed to receive the Angola Boers who had trekked to Angola out of refusal to accept the British government in South Africa. Sergeant Basson took over the office at Swartbooisdrift and excavated Opuwo's first borehole. Basson had the nickname “Katjiriamakaja” (a person who eats tobacco).

== Culture ==
The Opuwo Town Council hosts the annual Opuwo Trade Fair, which was launched in 2012. The festival combines a modern business exhibition with cultural performances, live shows, and entertainment. The Opuwo Trade Fair takes place in the month of May.

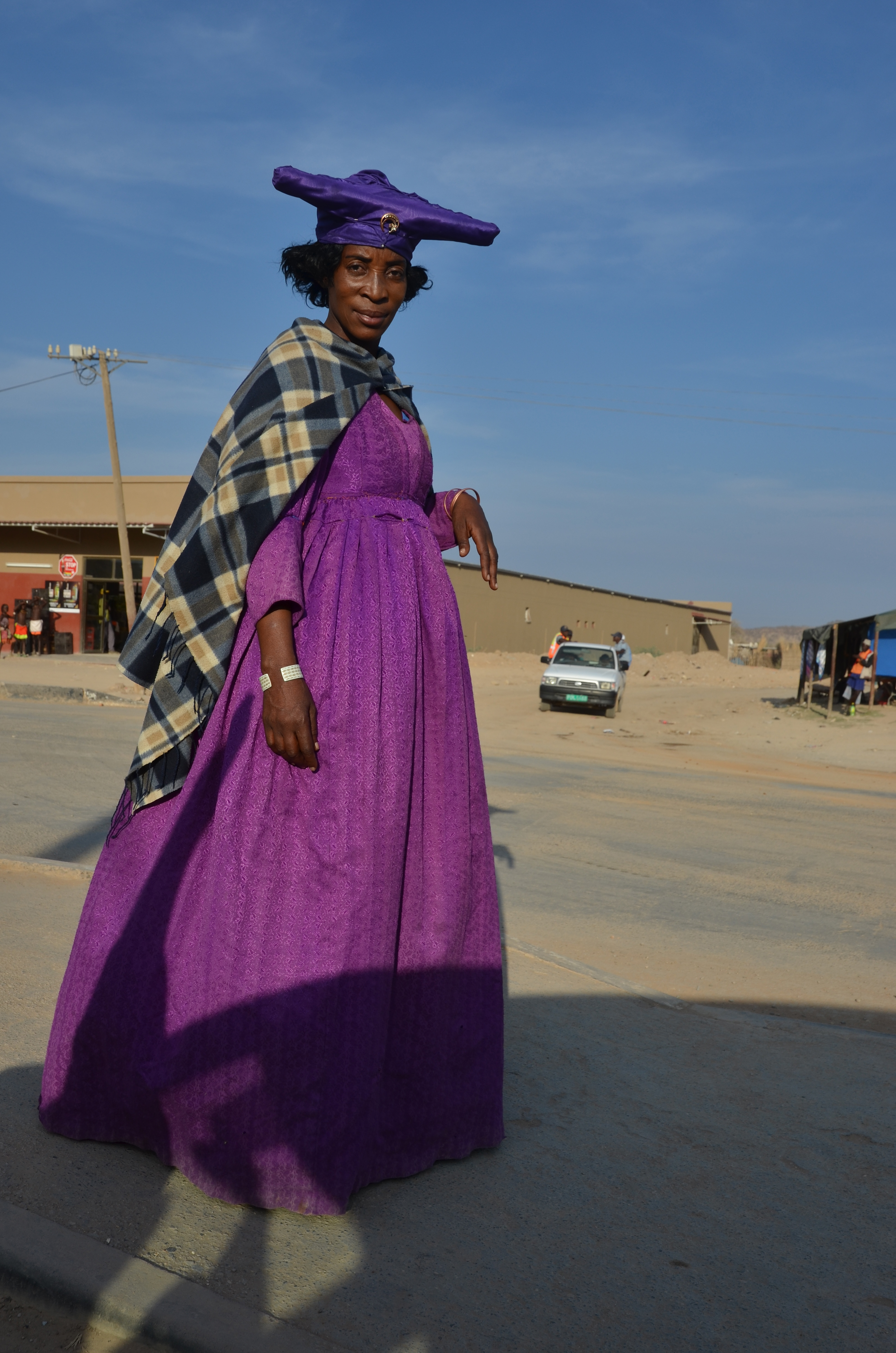
Herero woman in Opuwo
