= René Viguier =

French botanist

René Viguier (19 May 1880, in Paris – 17 January 1931, in Caen) was a French botanist known for his investigations of plants within the family Araliaceae.

He worked as a préparateur at the Muséum national d'histoire naturelle with Philippe Édouard Léon Van Tieghem, afterwards serving as maître de conférences at the Sorbonne. In 1912 he collected botanical specimens in Madagascar with Jean-Henri Humbert. From 1919 to 1931 he was a professor of botany at the University of Caen as well as director of city's botanical garden.

He was a member of the Société botanique de France (from 1904), the Société linnéenne de Lyon (from 1921) and the Société linnéenne de Normandie (from 1919). In 1927 he founded the Archives de botanique.

The French Academy of Sciences awarded him the Prix de Coincy for 1909. The grass genus Viguierella was named in his honor by Aimée Antoinette Camus (1926). Most plant taxa with the specific epithet of viguieri are also named after him, an example being the grass species Cephalostachyum viguieri.

== Selected works ==
- Recherches anatomiques sur la classification des Araliacées, 1906 – Anatomical research on the classification of Araliaceae.
- Contribution à l'étude de la flore de la Nouvelle-Calédonie : Araliacées, 1913 – Contributions to the study of New Caledonian flora, Araliaceae.
- Guttifères nouvelles de Madagascar, 1914 (with Jean-Henri Humbert) – New Guttiferae of Madagascar.
