= Cunene River =

River in southern Africa

Cunene River Kunene River
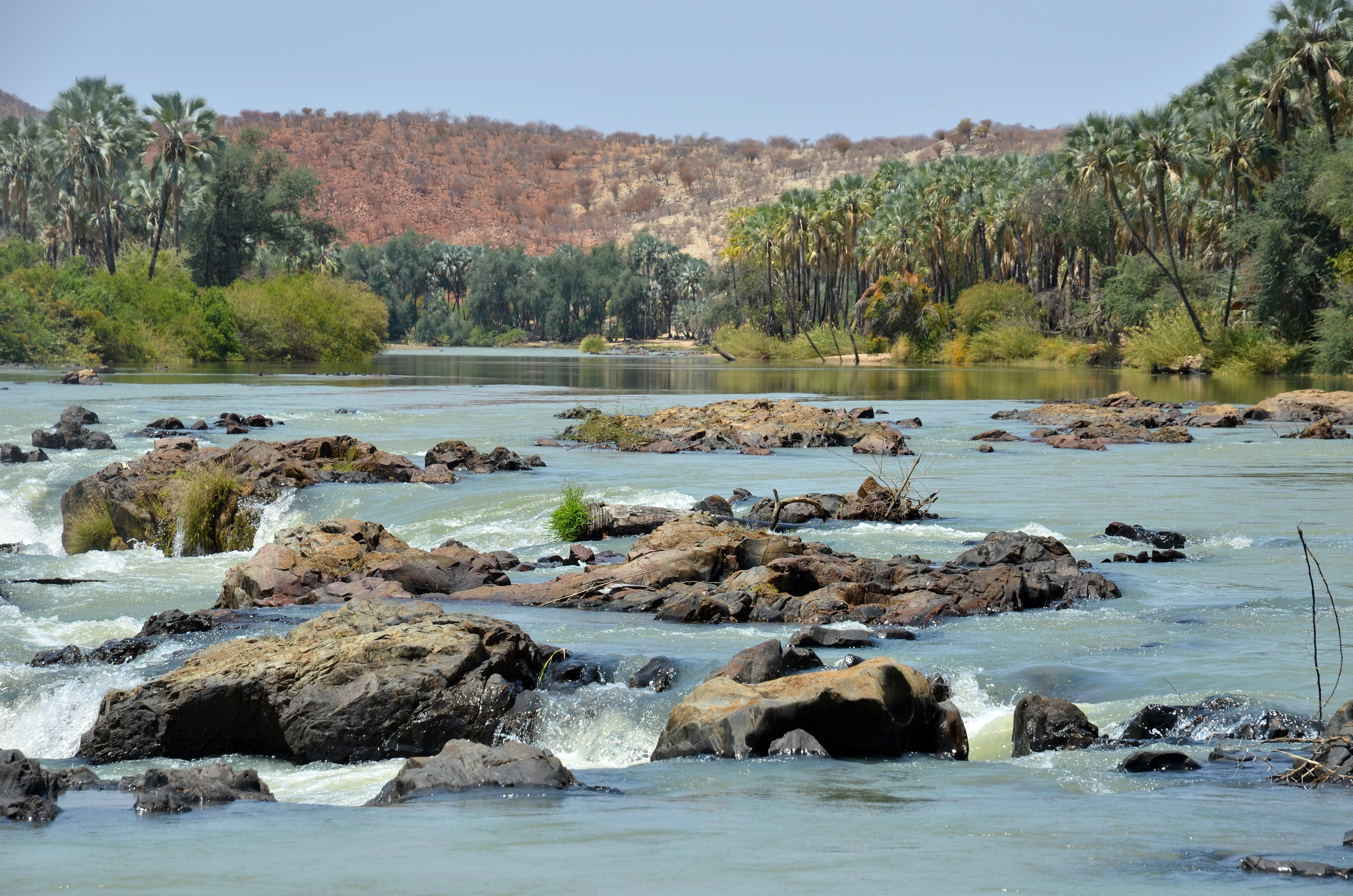
- Cunene (Kunene) River near Epupa Falls

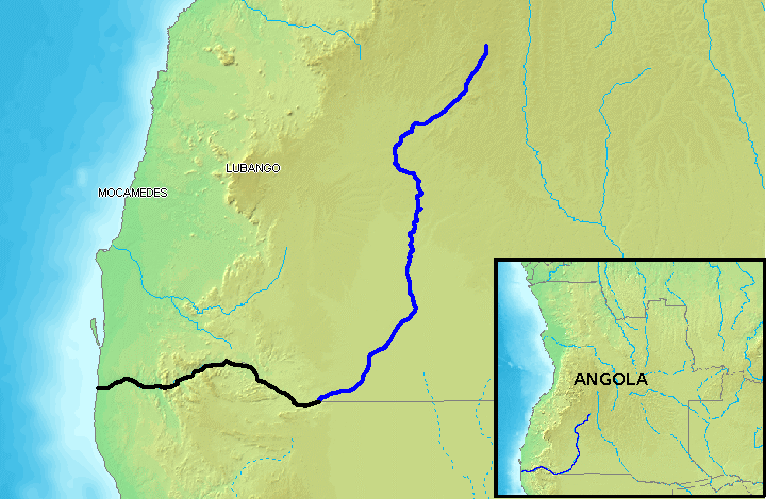
- Course of the Kunene (Cunene) River, parts in Angola highlighted in blue

Location
- Countries: Angola and Namibia

Physical characteristics
- Source
  - location: Angolan Highlands
- Mouth: Atlantic Ocean
  - coordinates: 17°15′09″S 11°45′05″E
  - elevation: 0 m (0 ft)
- Length: 1,050 km (650 mi)
- Basin size: 106,560 km^{2} (41,140 mi^{2}) to 108,943 km^{2} (42,063 mi^{2})
- Discharge
  - average: (Period: 1971–2000)221.7 m^{3}/s (7,830 cu ft/s) 174 m^{3}/s (6,100 cu ft/s)

Basin features
- Waterfalls: Epupa Falls, Ruacana Falls

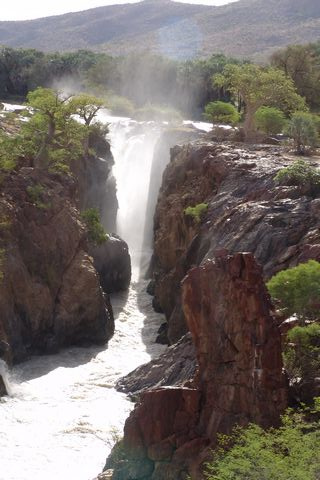
Epupa Falls

The Cunene (Portuguese spelling) or Kunene (common Namibian spelling) (Note: Pronunciation: British English: /kjuːˈneɪnə/ kew-NAY-nə, American English: /kuːˈ-/ koo-.) is a river in Southern Africa. It flows from the Angola highlands southwards to the border with Namibia. It then flows in a westerly direction along the border until it reaches the Atlantic Ocean.

== Geography ==
One of the few perennial rivers in the region, the Cunene is about 1,050 km (650 mi) long, with a drainage basin 106,560 km^{2} (41,140 mi^{2}) in area. Its mean annual discharge is 174 m^{3}/s (6,100 cu ft/s) to 222 m^{3}/s (7,800 cu ft/s) at its mouth. The Epupa Falls lie on the river. Olushandja Dam dams a tributary of the river, the Etaka, and helps to provide the Ruacana Power Station with water.

The main stream rises in 12° 30′ S. and about 160 miles in a direct line from the sea at Benguella, runs generally from north to south through four degrees of latitude, but finally flows west to the sea through a break in the outer highlands.

Between the mouths of its two tributaries, the Cunene traverses a swampy plain, inundated during high water, and containing several small lakes at other times of the year. From this swampy region divergent branches run S.E. They are mainly intermittent, but the Kwamatuo, which leaves the main stream in about 15° 8′ E., 17° 15′ S., flows into a large marsh or lake called Etosha, which occupies a depression in the inner table-land about 3400 ft. above sea-level. From the S.E. end of the Etosha lake streams issue in the direction of the Okavango, to which in times of great flood they contribute some water.

On leaving the swampy region the Cunene turns decidedly to the west, and descends to the coast plain by a number of cataracts, of which the chief (in 17° 25′ S., 14° 20′ E.) has a fall of 330 ft. The river becomes smaller in volume as it passes through an almost desert region with little or no vegetation. The stream is sometimes shallow and fordable, at others confined to a narrow rocky channel. Near the sea the Cunene traverses a region of sand-hills, its mouth being completely blocked at low water. The river enters the Atlantic in 17° 18′ S., 11° 40′ E. There are indications that a former branch of the river once entered a bay to the south.

== Dam controversies ==
The Namibian government proposed in the late 1990s to build the Epupa Dam, a controversial hydroelectric dam on the Cunene. In 2012 the Governments of Namibia and Angola announced plans to jointly build the Orokawe dam in the Baynes Mountains. According to the indigenous Himba who would have been most affected by the construction of the dam, the dam would threaten the local ecosystem and therefore the economic basis of the Himba. During February 2012, traditional Himba chiefs issued a declaration to the African Union and to the United Nations Human Rights Council of the United Nations, titled "Declaration of the most affected Ovahimba, Ovatwa, Ovatjimba and Ovazemba against the Orokawe Dam in the Baynes Mountains," which outlines the fierce objections against the dam from the traditional Himba chiefs and communities that reside near the Kunene River.

In September 2012, the United Nations special rapporteur on the Rights of Indigenous Peoples visited the Himba, and heard their concerns.

On November 23, 2012, hundreds of Himba and Zemba from Omuhonga and Epupa region protested in Okanguati against Namibia's plans to construct a dam in the Kunene River in the Baynes Mountains, against increasing mining operations on their traditional land and human rights violations against them.

On March 25, 2013, over a thousand Himba and Zemba people marched in Opuwo to protest once more against Namibia's plans to build the Orokawe dam in the Cunene River without consulting with the indigenous peoples that do not consent to the construction plans.

== Attraction ==
Tourists frequent campsites or lodges at Epupa, which offer water sports on the river, including rafting and canoeing. Ancient baobab trees grow alongside the gorge, and there is an attractive and well-kept viewpoint high above the village and falls.
