= Oshipumbu =

- Village
- Location in Namibia
- Coordinates: 18°1′59″S 15°43′59″E
- Country: Namibia
- Region: Oshana Region
- Region: Ompundja Constituency
- Time zone: UTC+1 (South African Standard Time)

Oshipumbu or Oshipumbu Shomugongo is a village in Ompundja Constituency, Oshana Region, northern Namibia. The name means "group of tall trees". Oshipumbu Shomugongo is approximately 17 km (11 mi) away from Oshakati, a northern town in Oshana region. Oshipumbu is in the Ondonga Traditional Authority and lies in the Lake Oponono area. There are two schools, namely Onevonga Primary School and Oshipumbu Combined School. The councilor of Oshipumbu is Adolf Uunona, a former teacher at the combined school. Clean water is available which has been provided by the Directorate of Rural Water Supply; water-points have been set up throughout the village. The inhabitants are small-scale subsistence farmers who keep livestock, such as cattle, goats, sheep, donkeys, and grow crops, such as maize and sorghum, for their own consumption. A rape case was reported from Oshipumbu Shomugongo in 2021. There is also an agricultural technician in the village named Sirkka Kanalelo.
