= Lake Oponona =

Lake in Namibia

- Location within Namibia
- Location: Namibia
- Coordinates: 18.13°S 15.76°E

Ramsar Wetland
- Official name: Etosha Pan, Lake Oponono & Cuvelai drainage
- Designated: August 23, 1995
- Reference no.: 745

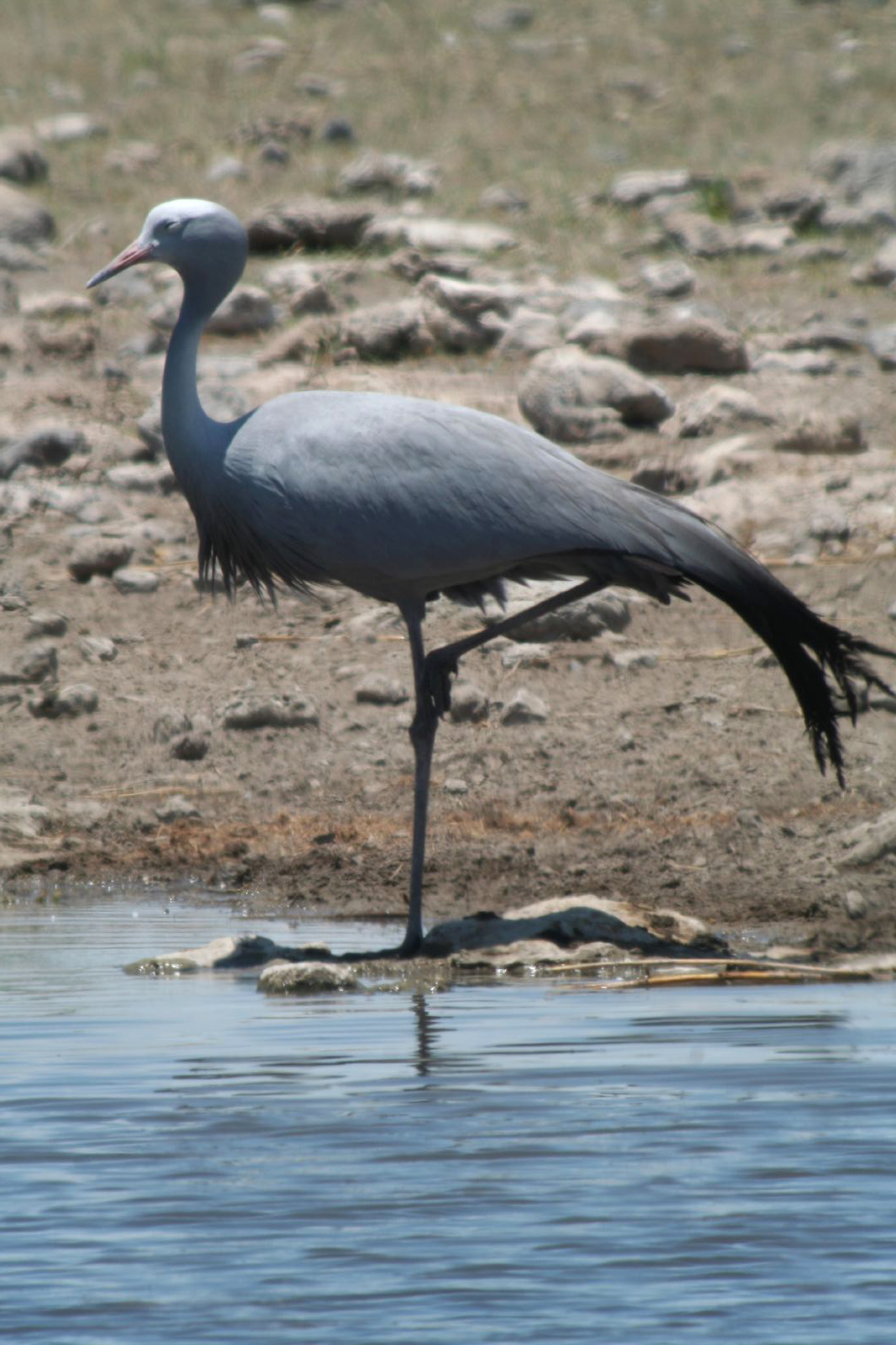
A Blue Crane, a species of bird that migrates to Lake Oponona when other wetlands dry up

Lake Oponona (Ndonga: the one that swallowed up all the water) is a natural lake in the Uuvudhiya Constituency in the Oshana Region of northern Namibia. It is situated about 70 kilometres (43 mi) from Etosha Pan and is the largest lake in the Cuvelai Basin.

It holds water up to the following rainy season in a prosperous year. Because the lake maintains water for a long time a number of birds like flamingos and others temporarily move there, when the oshanas (flood plains), swamps, and other wetlands dry up.

During the 2012/2013 drought Lake Oponona shrank by more than 500 metres (1,600 ft) due to thousands of cattle that were moved there to drink.

There is also Oponona River situated at Oniizimba village of Ompundja Constituency.
