= Uuvudhiya Constituency =

Electoral constituency in Oshana region, Namibia

Coordinates: 18°8′S 15°29′E

Uuvudhiya constituency (red) in the Oshana Region

Uuvudhiya Constituency is an electoral constituency in the Oshana Region of Namibia. The constituency office is situated in Engombe. Uuvudhiya Constituency had a population of 4,114 in 2011, down from 4,378 in 2001.

== Geography ==
The constituency is by far the largest in Oshana region. It covers an area of 5,825 km^{2} (2,249 sq mi) and is part of the Cuvelai Basin, including Lake Oponona, its largest lake. The area is dominated by flood plains which become swamps during the raining season.

== Economy and infrastructure ==
The district road D3607 is the access road to Uuvudhiya constituency. There are no other proclaimed roads in the constituency; Transport is done on tracks that frequently become impassable during the raining season.

== Politics ==
Uuvudhiya constituency is traditionally a stronghold of the South West Africa People's Organization (SWAPO) party. In the 2004 regional election SWAPO candidate Seblon Paulus received 2,099 of the 2,130 votes cast. Councillor Paulus was reelected in the 2010 regional elections with 1,621 votes. His only challenger was Gabriel Jeremia of the Rally for Democracy and Progress (RDP) who received 19 votes.

In the 2015 local and regional elections the SWAPO candidate won uncontested and became councillor after no opposition party nominated a candidate. For the 2020 regional election again no opposition candidate was fielded, and Timoteus Shoopala Shivute, the SWAPO candidate, was duly elected.
