= Salt flat =

Flat expanse of ground covered with salt and other minerals

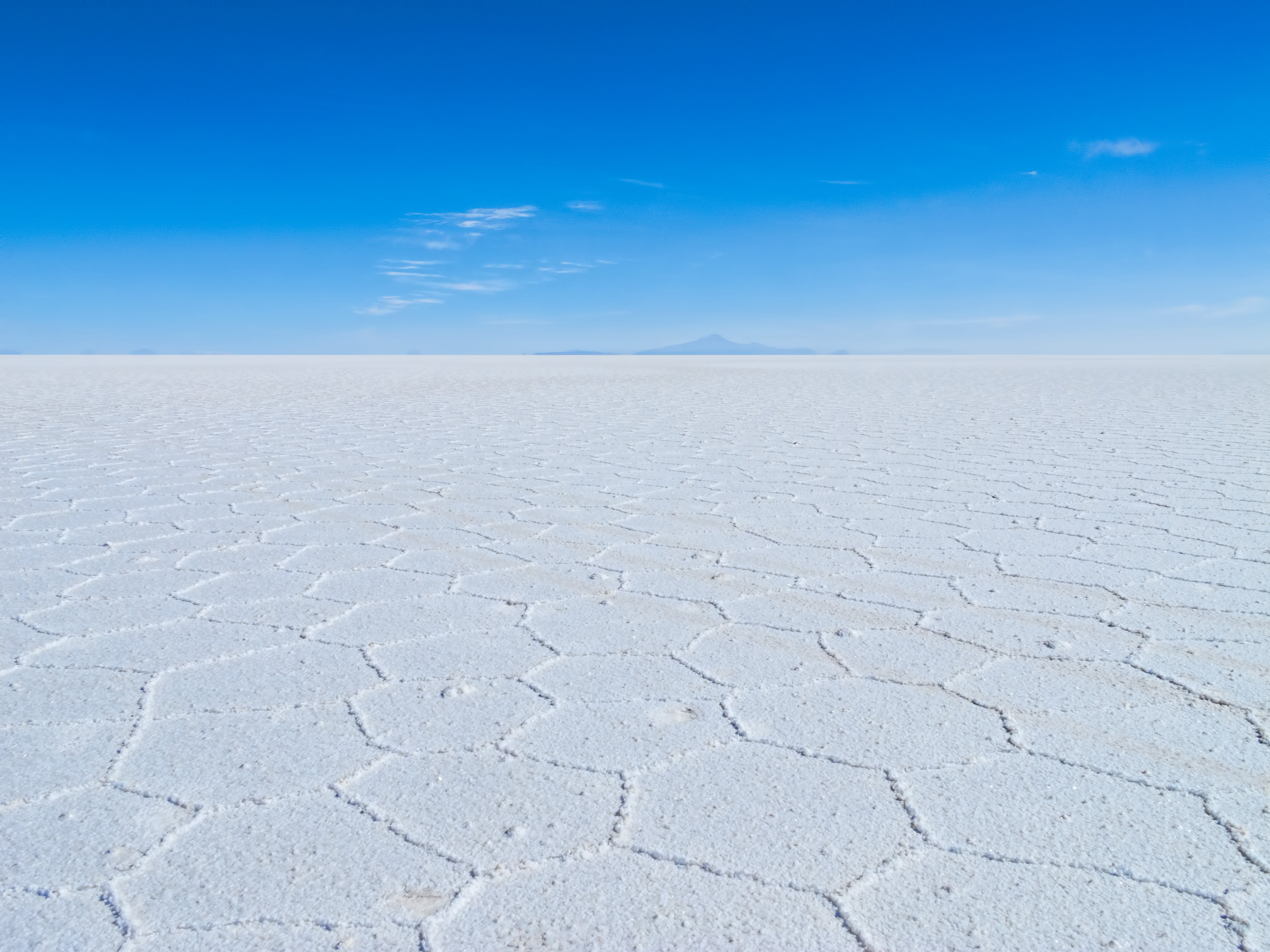
The Salar de Uyuni, in Bolivia, the world's largest salt pan.

Natural salt flats or salt pans are flat, open expanses of ground covered with salt and other minerals, usually shining white under the sun. They are found in deserts and are natural formations (unlike salt evaporation ponds, which are artificial).

A salt flat forms by evaporation of a water pool, such as a lake or pond. This happens in climates where the rate of water evaporation exceeds the rate of precipitation — that is, in a desert. If the water cannot drain into the ground, it remains on the surface until it evaporates, leaving behind minerals precipitated from the salt ions dissolved in the water. Over thousands of years, the minerals (usually salts) accumulate on the surface. These minerals reflect the sun's rays and often appear as white areas.

Salt flats can be dangerous. The crust of salt can conceal a quagmire of mud that can engulf a truck. The Qattara Depression in the eastern Sahara Desert contains many such traps which served as strategic barriers during World War II.

== Examples ==
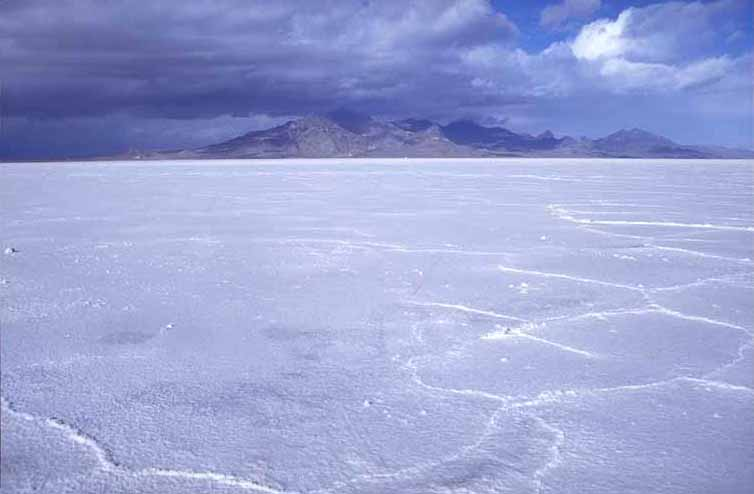
The Bonneville Salt Flats, Utah

The Bonneville Salt Flats in Utah, where many land speed records have been set, are a well-known salt pan in the arid regions of the western United States.

The Etosha pan, in the Etosha National Park in Namibia, is another prominent example of a salt pan.

The Salar de Uyuni in Bolivia is the largest salt pan in the world. As of 2024, with an estimated 23 million tons, Bolivia holds about 22% of the world's known lithium resources (105 million tons); most of those are in the Salar de Uyuni. The large area, clear skies, and exceptional flatness of the surface make the Salar an ideal object for calibrating the altimeters of Earth observation satellites.

Parts of Rann of Kutch (India) are salt marsh in the wet season and salt pan in the dry season.

Salt flats can also be found in Kenya. A place called Chalbi Desert in North Horr Sub County, Marsabit County in Kenya. In the language of the Gabra people, "Chalbi" means "bare, salty area".

== See also ==
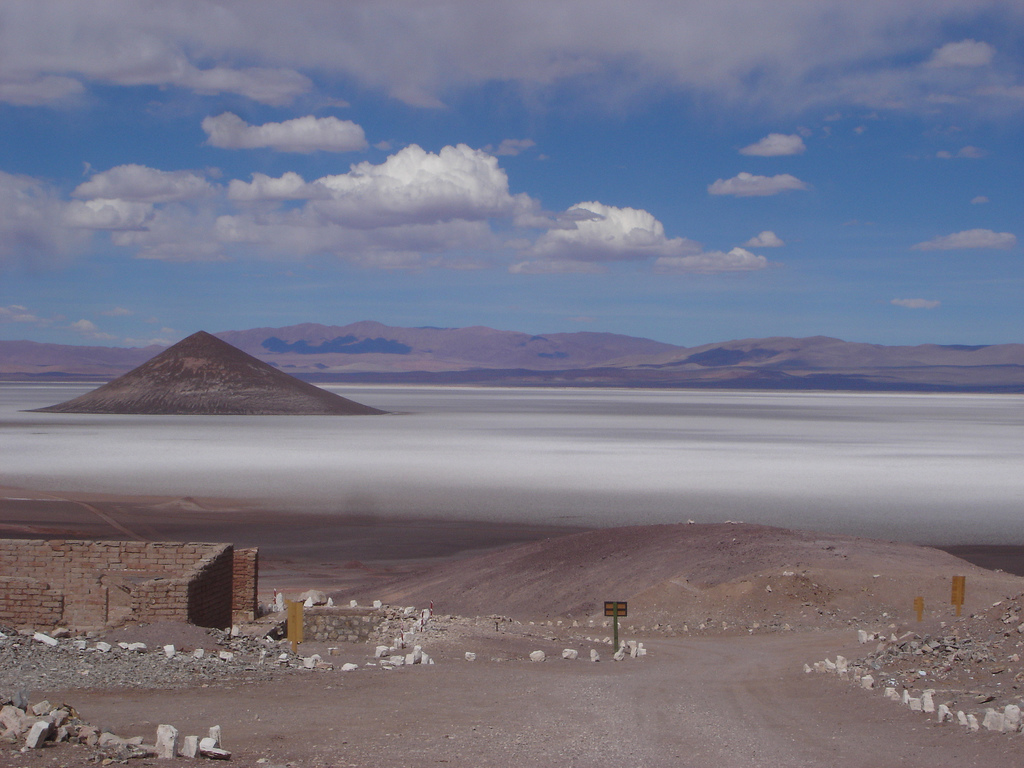
Cono de Arita in Salar de Arizaro, Argentina

- Chott – Dry lake in the Saharan area of Africa
- Dry lake – Area that contained a standing surface water body
- Sabkha – Salt lake above the tide line, where evaporite deposits accumulate
- Salt diapir – Structural dome formed of salt or halite
- Salt evaporation pond – Artificial salt pan designed to extract salts from sea water or other brines
- Salt lake – Landlocked body of water which has a high concentration of salts
- Salt tectonics – Geology of salt structures
- Sink – Closed drainage basin that has no outflow
- Solonchak – Type of pale or grey soil
- Mudflat – Coastal wetlands where sediments have been deposited by tides or rivers
- Takir (soil) – Relief occurring in the deserts of Central Asia
- Water pan – Shallow pond or reservoir for arid areas

== Sources ==
- Briere, Peter R. (May 2002). "Playa, playa lake, sabkha: Proposed definitions for old terms". Journal of Arid Environments. 45 (1). Elsevier: 1–7. Bibcode:2000JArEn..45....1B. doi:10.1006/jare.2000.0633.
- Lowenstein, Tim K.; Lawrence A. Hardie (October 1985). "Criteria for the recognition of salt-pan evaporites". Sedimentation. 32 (5): 627–644. Bibcode:1985Sedim..32..627L. doi:10.1111/j.1365-3091.1985.tb00478.x.
