= Treatment pond =

A treatment pond is intended to provide wastewater treatment to achieve a certain effluent quality. Ponds are depressions holding water confined by earthen structures.

Kinds of treatment pond include:

- Aerated lagoons rely upon mechanical aerators providing oxygen to reduce the organic content measured as biochemical oxygen demand (BOD).
- Anaerobic lagoons are waste stabilization ponds providing habitat for anaerobic microorganisms.
- Free surface constructed wetlands are shallow ponds using managed arrangements of rooted vegetation to physically arrest solids and particulate material while removing soluble nutrients in the water by uptake into plant tissue and supplying oxygen to the water to reduce BOD.
- Detention basins are designed to temporarily hold runoff as a flood control measure; they are also called "dry ponds", "holding ponds" or "dry detention basins" if no permanent pool of water exists.
- Facultative lagoons are waste stabilization ponds providing stable stratified habitat for both aerobic organisms near the surface and anaerobic organisms in deeper water.
- Infiltration basins are ponds designed to percolate their contents into groundwater though underlying permeable soils serving as a filter to remove solids and some dissolved material through ion exchange or oxidation by soil microbes.
- Bank-side reservoirs are lined ponds for temporary storage of water taken from a nearby river during periods of adequate flow and good water quality.
- Retention basins are wet ponds designed to temporarily hold runoff as a flood control measure.
- Settling basins separate solids from liquid wastewaters by gravity without provision for reducing BOD of those solids through biochemical oxidation.
- Waste stabilization ponds are ponds built for wastewater treatment where biological processes occur which reduce the BOD and kill pathogens in the wastewater.
