= Water pan =

Shallow pond or reservoir for arid areas

A water pan is a shallow pond or reservoir that collects rainwater and surface run-off. The water is later used for human consumption, household use, livestock watering, or agricultural watering, in a form of rainwater harvesting. They are typically open and unlined depressions or reservoirs. Most pans are refilled by seasonal rainfall and surface and sub-surface runoff, while some can have deeper groundwater inputs. They can occur naturally in hollows or can be fully or partially constructed. Artificial constructions commonly have an inlet channel specifically dug to guide rainwater flowing over the ground into the pan, improving replenishment.

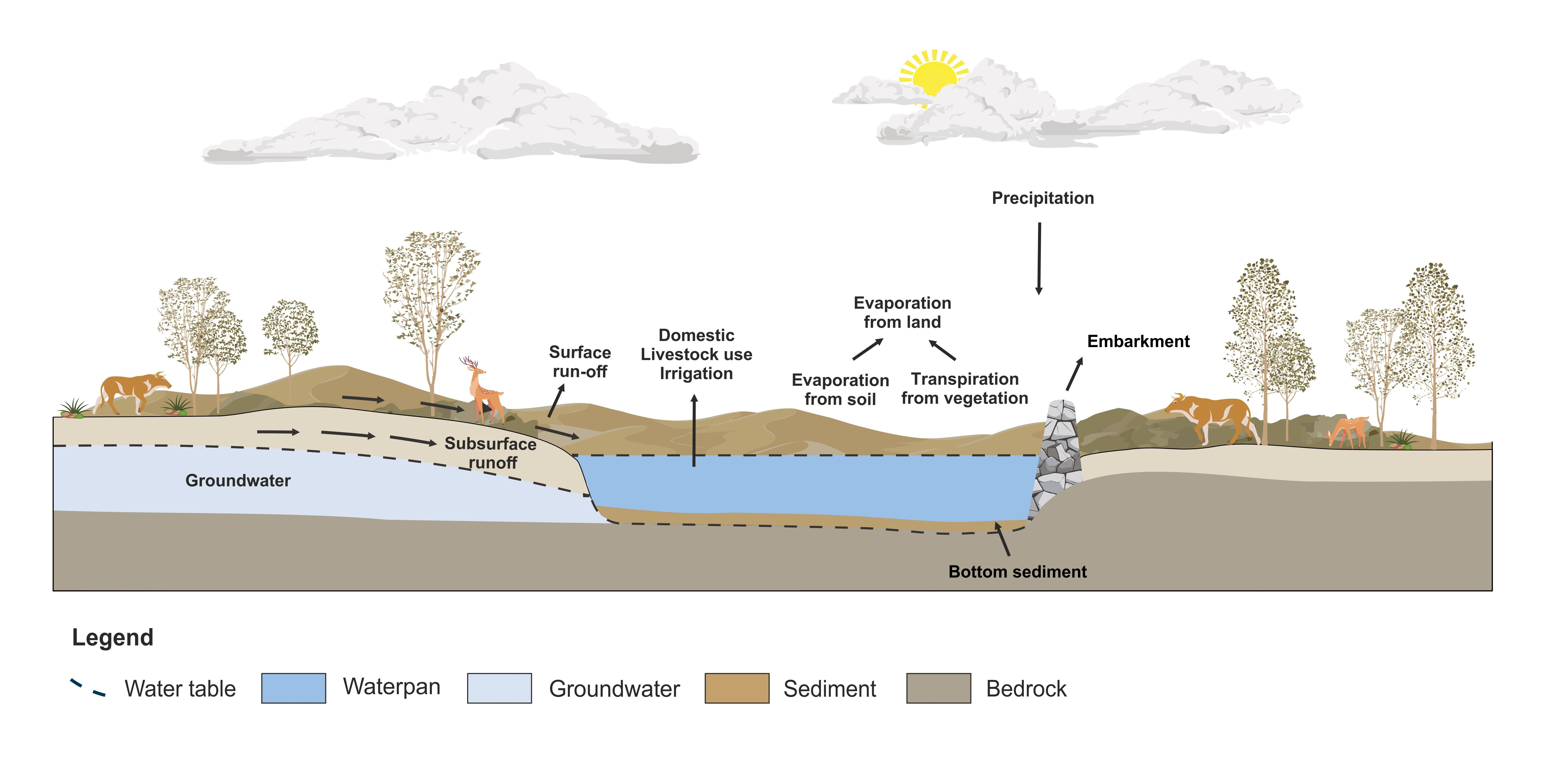
Conceptual diagram of a waterpan illustrating its hydrological processes, groundwater interactions, structural components, and principal water uses.

Smaller versions have lining, serving small-scale agriculture and as a source of water for livestock, or as a means of providing an alternative water source to keep livestock away from fragile landscapes. Water pan construction is typically in response to local priorities for access to water in remote areas lacking formal water supply.

Water pans are referred to by a number of names used in local or regional situations. In England, pans for livestock are often called dew ponds. In Tanzania, the term charco ponds or Swahili "malambo" is commonly used. Both in Tanzania and Kenya "silanga" is used for domestic water supply. Another form of water pan is the "Silanka ya ndovu" (Elephant dam) which forms in existing depressions created when livestock or elephants repeatedly trample the ground over time. In Sudan, the traditional Hafir are developed as drinking water troughs for livestock, used for livestock, farming, and household needs.

== Usages and importance ==
In sub-Sahara Africa, 80% of rural populations lacks access to centrally provided piped water. Communities use water pans to collect and store water, particularly in rural and arid regions, where formal water supply is absent or limited. By reducing the distance to water sources, water pans can provide better access to water, and lessen the physical burden on, particularly, women and children in providing water to households.

In very arid areas, or during extended droughts, water pans may be the only available water source for both human and animal populations. Water pans increase stable access to water for communities living in water scarce areas, and serve multiple purposes, for domestic use by humans (such as drinking, cooking, and washing) and livestock.

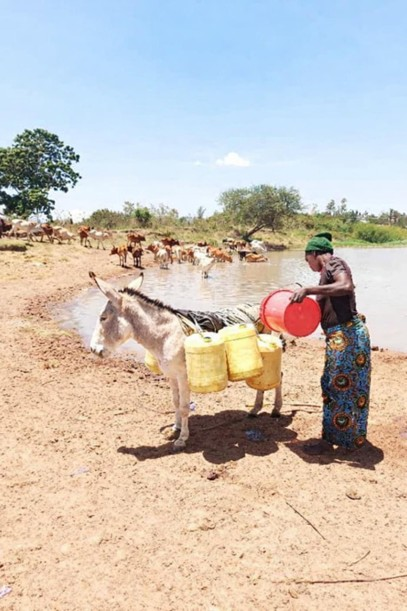
Woman collecting water Kamau waterpan, Tarime, Tanzania

Pastoralist communities use networks of water pans in supporting large herds of livestock, other water pans are used for aquaculture. In conservation areas water pans are often dug to provide water for wildlife, as well as for small-scale livestock use.

== Construction and maintenance ==
Many water pans have been constructed informally, often using locally available materials and community labour. Others are constructed according to design protocols approved by government agencies. Suitable sites for construction are places with deep clay or silty soils where run-off collects during the rainy season, and on land with a gentle slope no more than 4%. Sustainability of the water pan may be affected by sediment infilling, that requires periodic desilting. This is often a major issue for even relatively short-term use. Sediment loads can be reduced through their design and maintenance, involving the communities. Although currently not commonly applied, the longevity and sustainability of water pans can be improved through the use of nature-based solutions. This can also support climate adaptation and rural development.

Water pans can offer a similar ecosystem service as wetlands. For example, fringing reeds and plants can act as buffer strips retaining sediment and pollutants such as nutrients and heavy metals in surface runoff. Water pans provide habitat for a variety of fauna and flora, ranging from microscopic to megafauna such as hippopotami, and support food supply for resident and migratory birds.

== Hydrology ==
Water levels in a water pan can vary greatly, depending on direct and indirect water inflows, and outflows. Some water pans dry out seasonally, either because of seasonal rainfall patterns or how people manage the water, and may remain dry for months or even years. The primary water source for water pans is rainwater, with the volume and frequency of runoff depending largely on the interaction of rainfall with topography, land cover, soil type, and underlying geology. Vegetation and control of livestock in the drainage area reduces intensity of runoff and protects against erosion and, hence, high inputs of mobile sediment. Groundwater inputs depend on underlying geology which defines water exchanges with local aquifers. The extent of connection between groundwater and water pans is largely unknown.

As small bodies of water, with hydrology similar to ponds, water pans can be sensitive to even minor changes in climate or land use. Droughts, shifts in rainfall patterns, agricultural expansion, or urban encroachment can change how much water flows into them.

== Biogeochemistry ==
Many water pans receive direct and indirect nutrient loads from livestock and local landuse. Rates of nutrient cycling and greenhouse gas emissions can be high, arising from Interactions between water, sediment and biological processes. Chemical and biological processes are important, particularly for transformations involving carbon and nitrogen. Carbon exchange and methane emissions from water pans can be influenced by land use changes and seasonal rainfall. These processes can lead to eutrophication, changes in microbial communities, and increased greenhouse gas emissions, especially when pans become stagnant or overloaded with organic material. Periods of flooding and wetting in water pans accelerate the release of nutrients and dissolved organic matter

== Water quality and public health risks ==
Surface run-off, internal chemical and ecological processes, pathogens and pollution affect the water quality and public health risks of water pans. Monitoring of water quality and quantity of water pans, which can help track changes and support better adaptation strategies, is limited. Livestock can introduce pathogens into water pans, increasing health risks, especially when people use the water such as for drinking. Drinking untreated water increases risk of waterborne diseases such as diarrhea, cholera, and typhoid, and infection from a number of gut parasites. Fecal indicator bacteria Escherichia coli and Fecal streptococcus are commonly found in water pans. Toxic chemicals such as fluorides, arsenic and lead have been found in water pans. The contamination depends on the water pan's location and local geology and proximity to industries, roads, and quarries. In areas of high fluoride in groundwater, use of water pan water can reduce risks from dental fluorosis.

== Management ==
Sustainable management of water pans requires both technical and social measures, including community involvement. In many countries, the state legally owns water resources that are considered a public good. Communities often manage water pans, involving water user groups, local councils, or traditional leaders that can involve local regulations or bye-laws including for covering maintenance and management costs

Especially in arid and semi-arid regions water scarcity has been associated with conflicts over access to water and pasture, especially in the dry season.

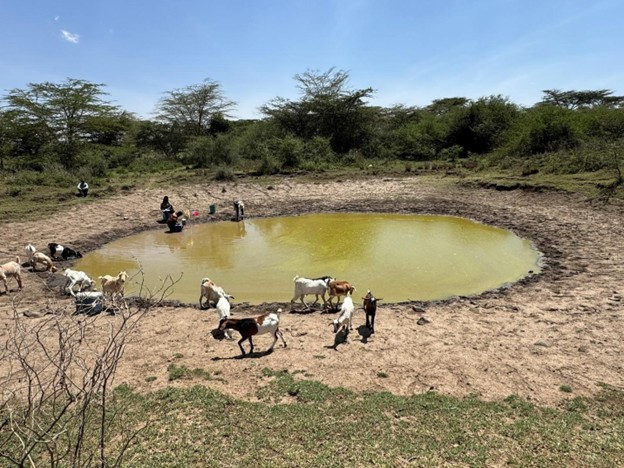
Cattle feeding at a Kenyan water pan during the dry season.

Common causes of conflict arise from land tenure, pollution, contamination, exclusion of certain communities e.g. pastoralists, and unclear rules for access. Water pan management can be complicated by unclear ownership, user rights, and lack of coordination among authorities.

Customary rights and traditional systems often influence ownership and access rules. Maintenance is a persistent challenge, leading to frequent siltation, water loss, and structural degradation. Where these structures have been installed, water offtakes used for human or livestock consumption are often degraded and non-functional. Projects funded through external agencies can result in conflict, limited ownership and lack of longer-term maintenance. Clear rules and cooperation between local and state authorities can improve management, but often these are curtailed by insufficient local government capacity. Some constructed water pans are subject to strict guidelines for rural water supply, but overall these cover only a small percentage of water pans supplying water supply to rural communities.

For example, in Kenya and Tanzania, public-private partnerships, NGOs, or individuals may develop water pans, with ownership residing in the developer or host community. In parts of Tanzania, local users often claim informal ownership based on ancestral use or community contribution to construction. However, these customary claims can lead to tensions if they conflict with statutory laws or formal land and water rights frameworks. Well managed water pans typically collect fees for maintenance. Water inputs drain subsurface areas, and there may be separate outlets for human and livestock consumption. For most water pans, however, access is open to both people, livestock and wildlife. In some cases, local road constructions create water pans, with no management at all.

=== Complication of management in Kenya, Uganda and Tanzania ===
In Tanzania and Kenya, water pans serve as sources of water for domestic use, livestock, and small-scale irrigation, especially in regions with limited access to piped water or perennial rivers. Both Kenya and Tanzania have integrated water pans into their national strategies for climate adaptation and rural development, recognizing them in policies that support local water management. Despite increasing policy support for water pans in arid and semi-arid regions, implementation can be difficult owing to issues such as unclear ownership, poor coordination among sectors, and limited community involvement. Overlapping responsibilities among agencies, and how inadequate technical and financial support often lead to mismanagement, conflicts, and eventual abandonment of these water sources. Institutional capacity of government agencies responsible for developing use rules, is often limited through training, funding, and technical support.

Customary laws and traditional governance structures, sometimes clash with national water governance systems, resulting in ineffective management. National policies such as Kenya's Water Act (2016) and Tanzania's Water Policy (2002, updated 2025) attempt to address these issues by transferring water management responsibilities to local authorities. Yet, implementation gaps persist, especially in aligning national laws with local practices, integrating customary and statutory systems, and ensuring equitable access.

In Kenya, the Water Act 2016 promotes the transfer of water management to County governments and recognizes the role of Water user board. In managing community-level infrastructure such as water pans. In Tanzania, the National Water Policy (2002) and the Water Resources Management Act (2009) establishes that the state owns water resources, with regional Water Boards responsible for water resources, working with local Water User Associations (WUAs). The Tanzania Rural Water and Sanitation Act No 5 of 2019 established the Rural Water Supply and Sanitation Agency (RUWASA) to provide safe water, including that from water pans. RUWASA has constructed or rehabilitated a number of water pans, but this is still overall a low number. Uganda's National Water Policy (1999) on the other hand, incorporates Integrated Water Resource Management (IWRM) as a basis of sustainable use of water resources. The Ugandan policy emphasizes user participation in planning, operation, and maintenance of rural water systems, particularly in arid and semi-arid regions. Communities may own the infrastructure. NGOs may support it, and public work programmes may construct it.

== See also ==
- Dew pond
- Rainwater harvesting
- Hafir
- Gilgai
- Salt pan (geology)
