= Ompundja Constituency =

Electoral constituency in the Oshana region of northern Namibia

Coordinates: 17°54′S 15°42′E

Ompundja Constituency (red) in the Oshana Region

Ompundja Constituency is an electoral constituency in the Oshana Region of Namibia. It had 2,520 registered voters in 2020. Its constituency office is situated in Enguwantale.

== Geography ==
The area is part of the Cuvelai Basin and dominated by flood plains which become swamps during the raining season. Ompundja Constituency covers an area of 466 km^{2} (180 sq mi). It had a population of 4,659 in 2011, up from 4,448 in 2001.

== Economy and infrastructure ==
The district road D3607 is the access road to Ompundja constituency. There are no other proclaimed roads in the constituency; transport is done on tracks that frequently become impassable during the raining season. The main economic activity is subsistence agriculture.

== Politics ==
Ompundja constituency is traditionally a stronghold of the South West Africa People's Organisation (SWAPO) party. The constituency's councillor is SWAPO politician Adolf Uunona, who has been serving in this role since 2004 when he received 1,686 of the 1,697 votes cast in the that year's regional election.

In the 2015 Namibian regional elections, Uunona won uncontested and remained councillor after no opposition party nominated a candidate. Uunona was again reelected in the 2020 Namibian regional elections, winning with 1,196 votes over Abner Mumbala of the Independent Patriots for Change (IPC), an opposition party formed in August 2020, with 213 votes.

Uunona rose to international attention in 2020 when news media reported that his full name was Adolf Hitler Uunona, named after German dictator Adolf Hitler. Uunona stated in response that, "My father gave me this name Adolf Hitler, but it does not mean I have Adolf Hitler's character". Uunona legally changed his name in 2025 to just "Adolf Uunona", dropping "Hitler" from his name out of a desire to not be associated with the German dictator.

Uunona won re-election in November 2025.

== See also ==
- Oshipumbu, a village in the constituency
