= Etosha Pan =

Big endorheic salt ville in Namibia's north

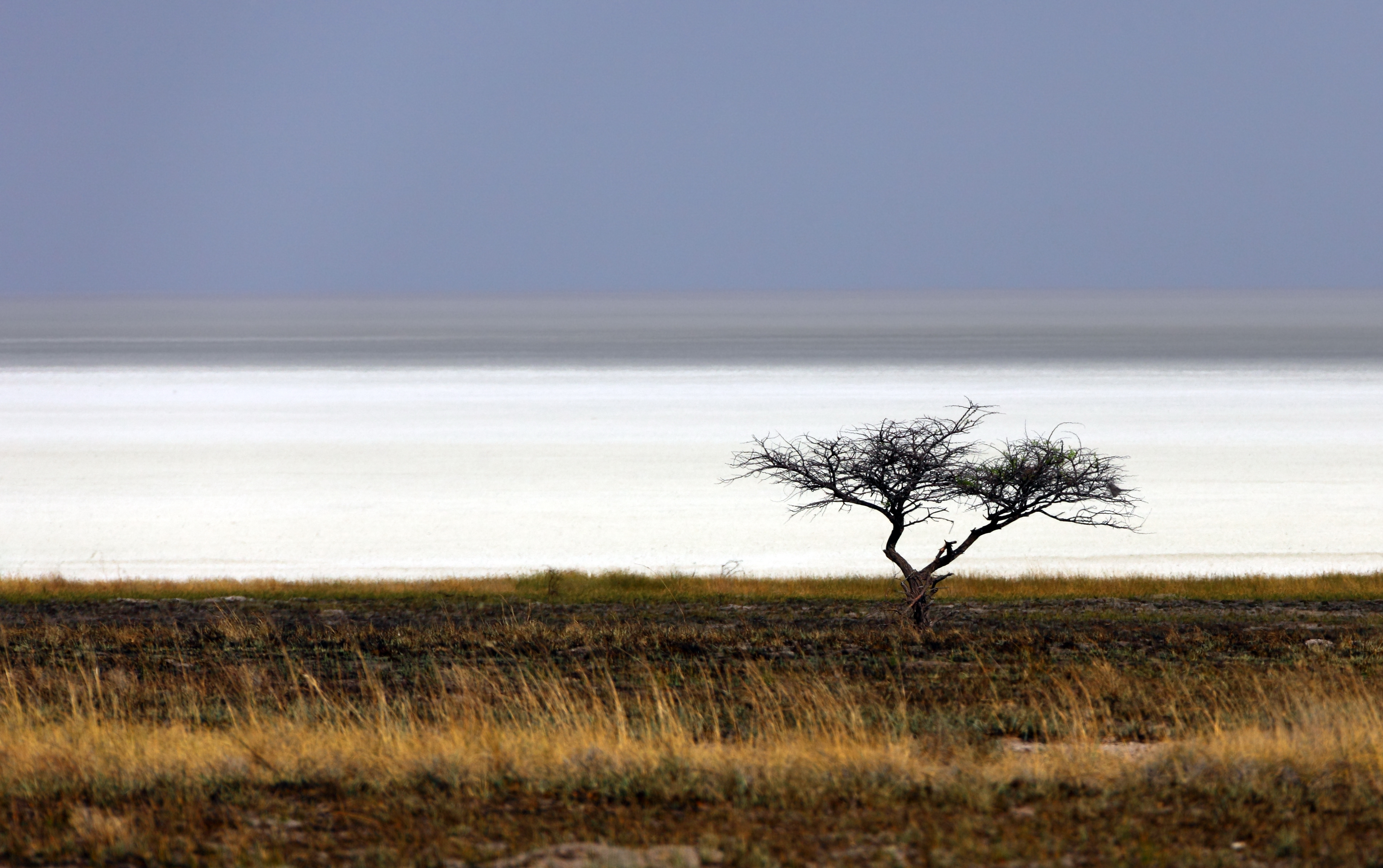
- Looking across the savannah to the hot, dry, salt-encrusted Etosha Pan

- Location within Namibia
- Location: Namibia
- Coordinates: 18°47′07″S 16°15′50″E

Ramsar Wetland
- Official name: Etosha Pan, Lake Oponono and Cuvelai drainage
- Designated: August 23, 1995

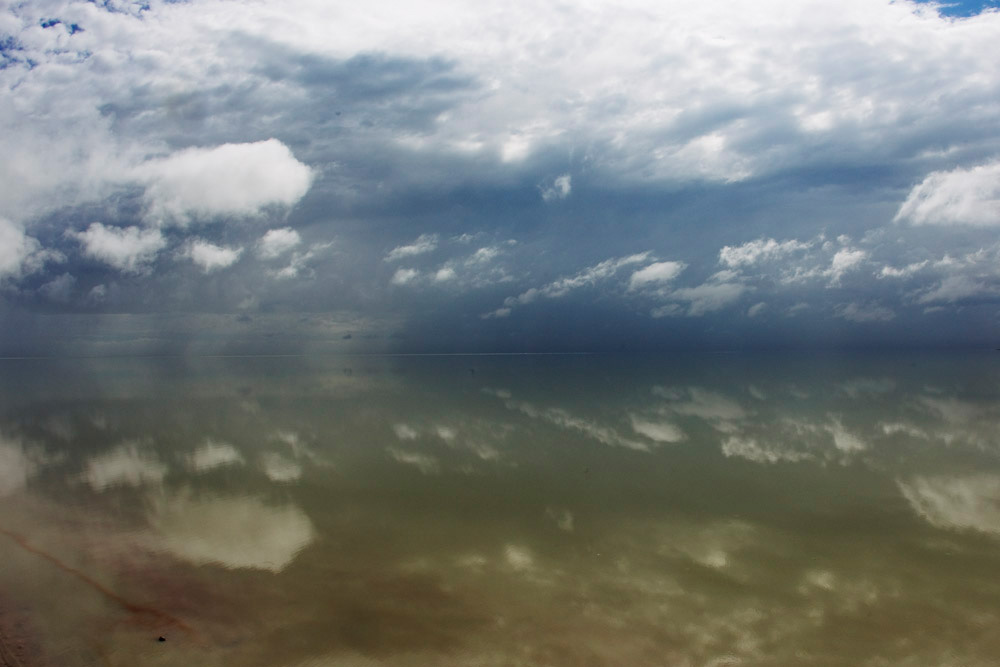
Etosha Pan during wet season, Etosha Lookout/Halali

The Etosha Pan is a large endorheic salt pan, forming part of the Cuvelai-Etosha Basin in the north of Namibia. It is a vast hollow in the ground in which water may collect or in which a deposit of salt remains after water has evaporated. The 120-kilometre-long (75-mile) dry lakebed and its surroundings are protected as Etosha National Park, Namibia's second-largest wildlife park, covering 22,270 square kilometres (8,600 mi^{2}). The pan is mostly dry, but after heavy rains, it is flooded with a thin layer of water, which is heavily salted by the mineral deposits on the surface.

== Location and description ==
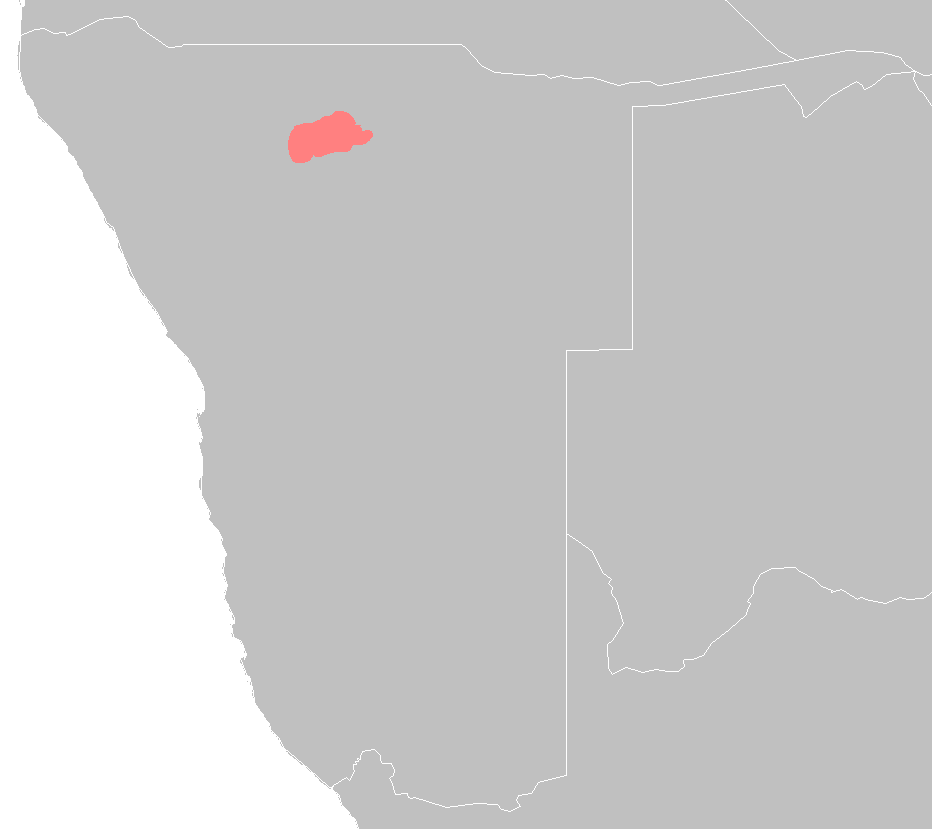
Location of the pan in Namibia

Etosha, meaning 'Great White Place' in Oshindonga, is made of a large mineral pan.

The area exhibits a characteristic white and greenish surface, which spreads over 4,800 square kilometres (1,900 mi^{2}). The pan is believed to have developed through tectonic activity over about ten million years. Around 16,000 years ago, when ice sheets were melting across the land masses of the Northern Hemisphere, a wet-climate phase in Southern Africa caused the Etosha Lake to be filled up. Today, however, the Etosha Pan is mostly made up of dry clay split into hexagonal shapes as it dries and cracks and is seldom seen with even a thin sheet of water covering it.

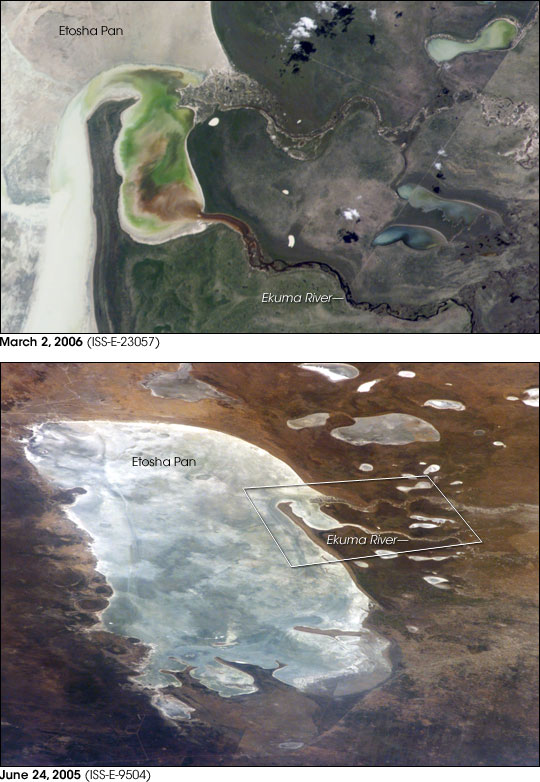
The first image shows the inflow of the Ekuma River. The surface flow here was sufficient to reach the pan, but insufficient to inundate it beyond the inlet bay. The lower image records the same inlet on the north shore, this time dry.

It is assumed that the Kunene River fed the lake in the distant past, but tectonic plate movements over time caused a change in river direction, resulting in the lake running dry and leaving a salt pan. Nowadays the Ekuma River, the Nipelo River, the Cuvelai River, and the Omurambo Ovambo River are the sole seasonal sources of water for the lake. Typically, not much river water or sediment reaches the dry lake, because water seeps away into the riverbed along its 250-kilometre (160-mile) course, reducing discharge along the way.

== History ==
In the colonial era, the first non-Africans to explore this area were the Europeans Charles John Andersson and Francis Galton in 1851.

== Plants and animals ==
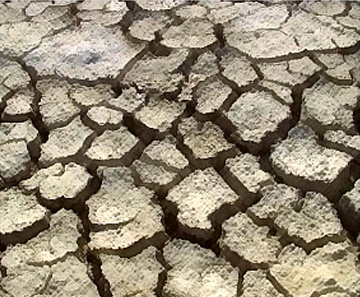
Desiccated soil of the Etosha pan

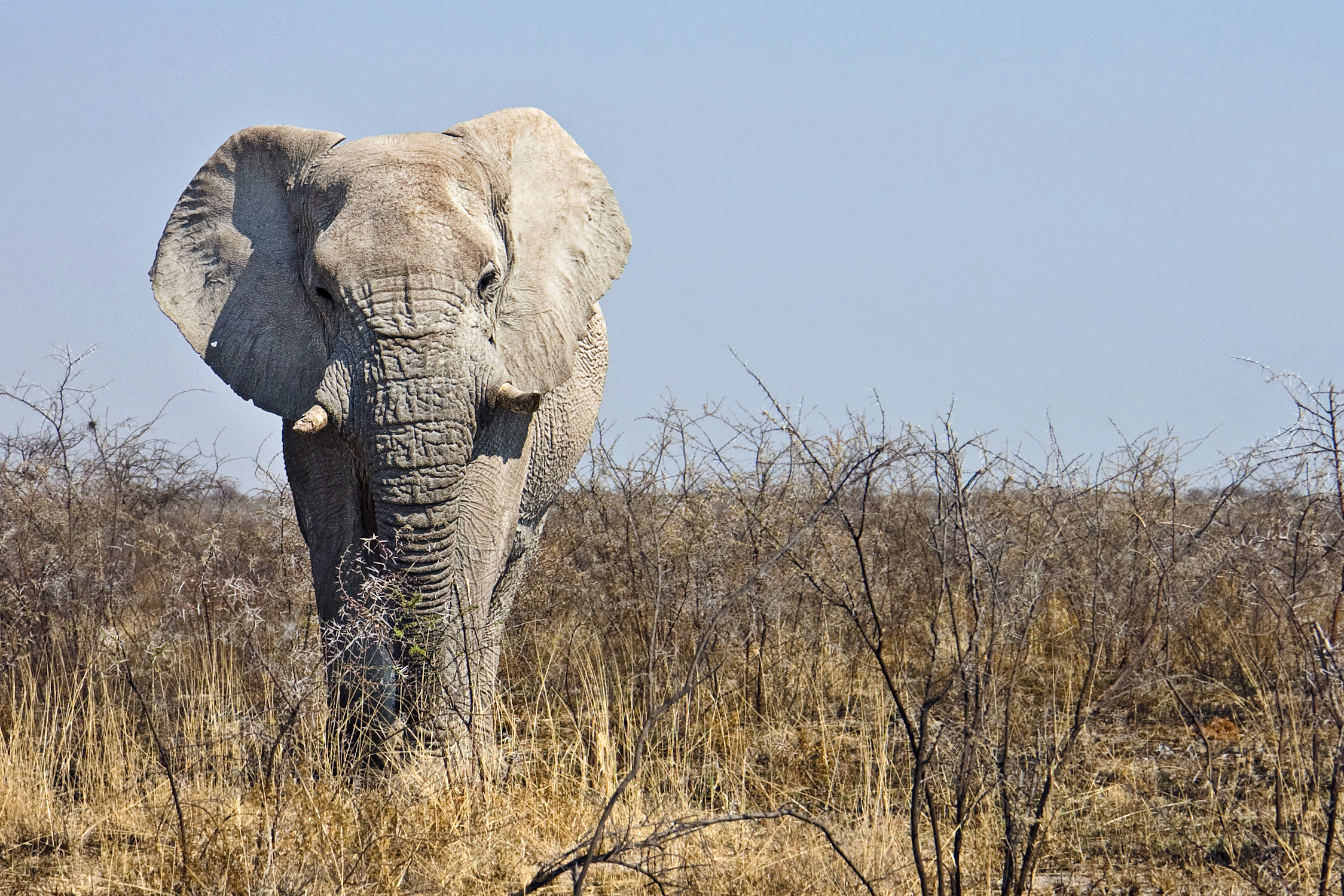
Male bush elephant south of the lake

The surrounding area is dense mopane woodland, which is occupied by herds of elephants on the south side of the lake. Mopane trees are common throughout south-central Africa, and host the mopane worm, which is the larval form of the moth Gonimbrasia belina, and an important source of protein for rural communities.

The salt desert supports very little plant life except for the blue-green algae that gives the Etosha Pan its characteristic colouring, and grasses like Sporobolus spicatus which quickly grow in the wet mud following good rains. Surrounding the pan, grasslands provide food for grazing animals.

This harsh, dry land with its sparse vegetation and insufficient amount of salty water, supports little wildlife all year round, but is sometimes inhabited by a large number of migratory birds. The hypersaline pan supports brine shrimp and a number of extremophile micro-organisms tolerant of the highly saline conditions. In particularly good rainy seasons, the Etosha pan is turned into a shallow lake approximately 10 cm deep and becomes the breeding ground for flamingos, which arrive in their thousands, and great white pelicans.

The surrounding savanna is home to thousands of mammals that visit the pan and surrounding waterholes when there is water. These include large numbers of zebra, wildebeest, gemsbok, springbok, eland, black rhinoceros, bush elephants, lions, leopards, and giraffes.

== Threats and protection ==
The Etosha Pan is situated completely within the boundaries of the Etosha National Park and is designated as a Ramsar wetland of international importance and a World Wildlife Fund ecoregion (Etosha Pan halophytics).
