= Pond =

Relatively small body of standing water

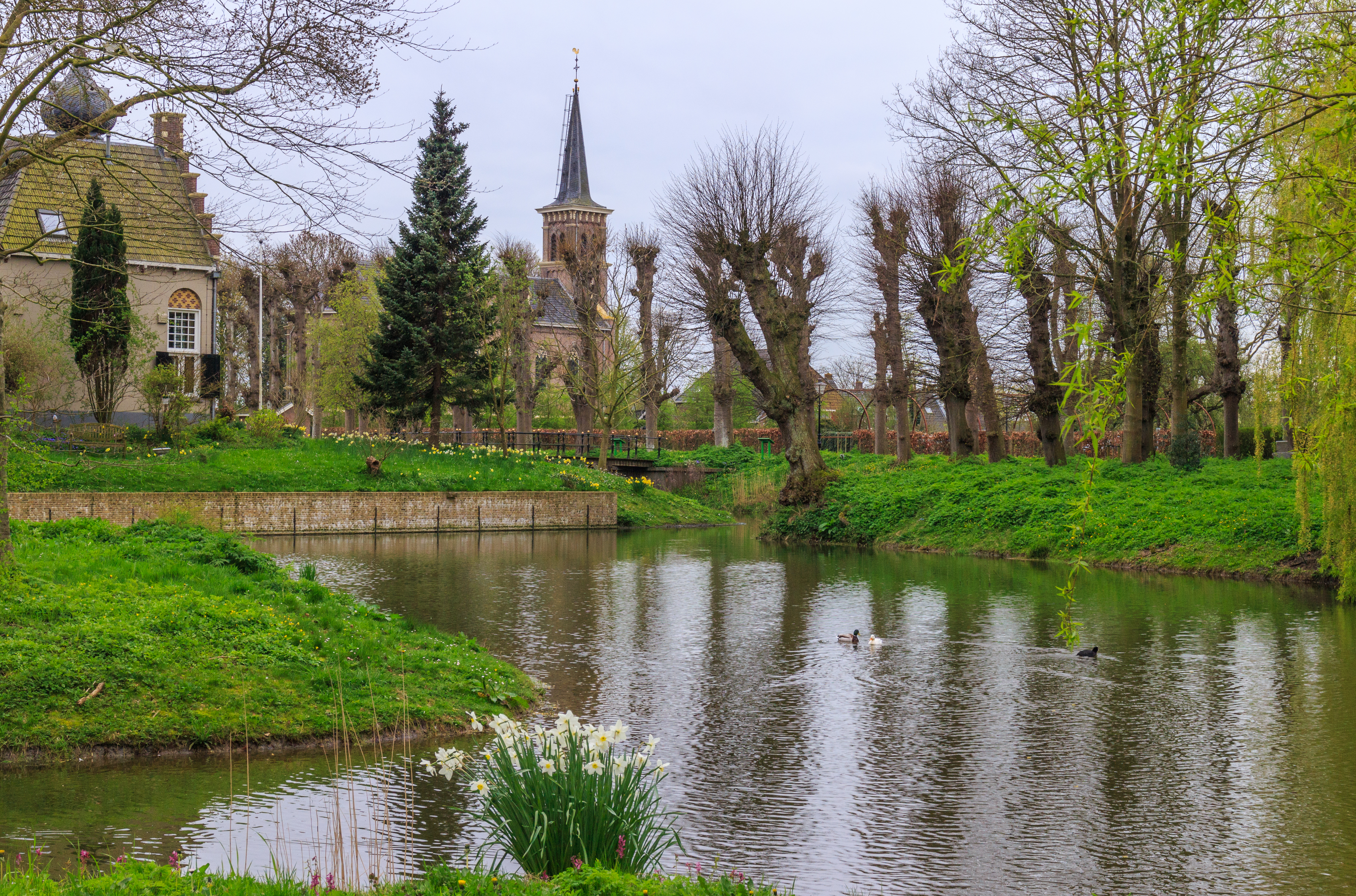
Pond at Cornjum, Netherlands

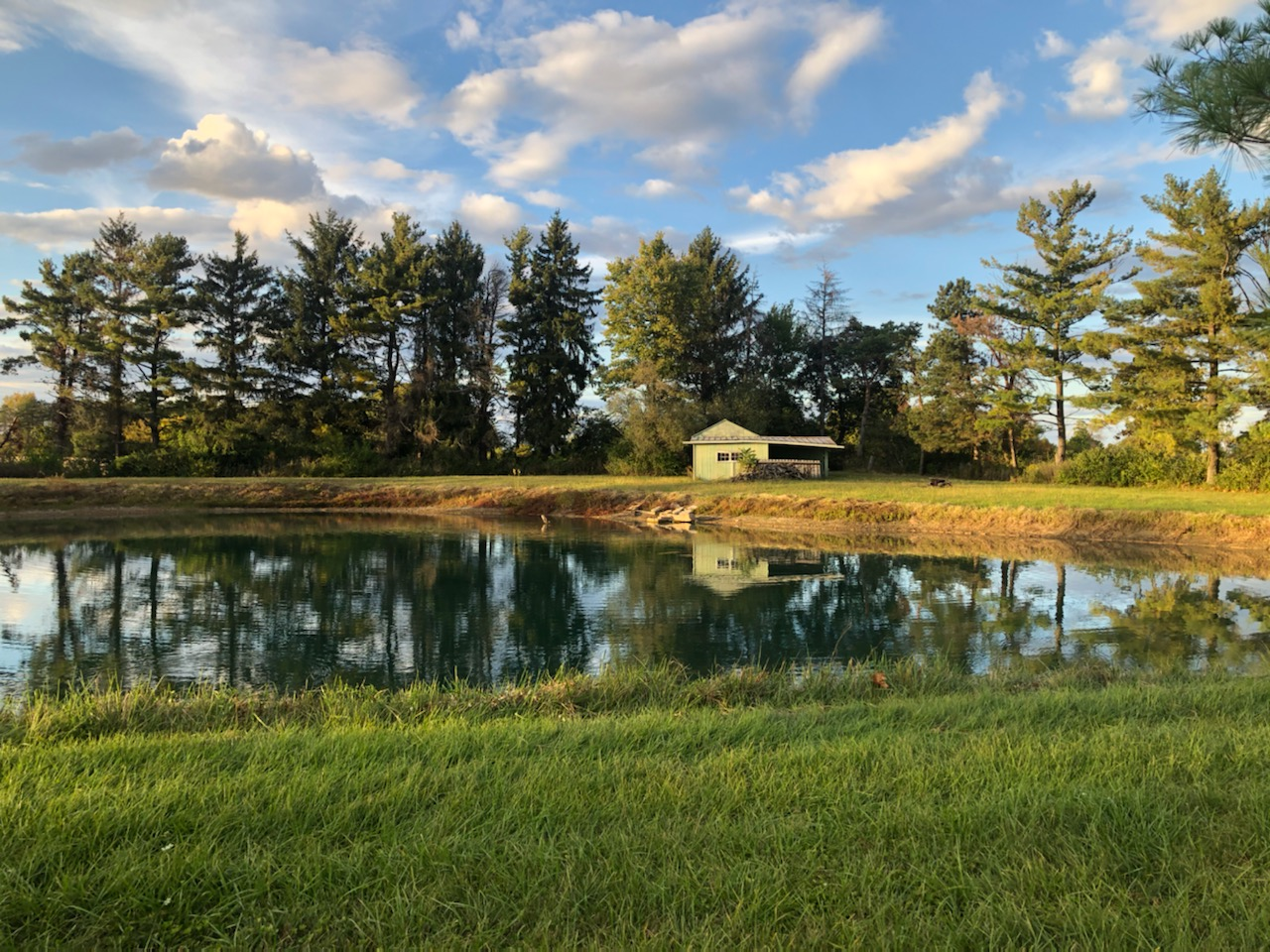
A man made pond at sunset in Montgomery County, Ohio.

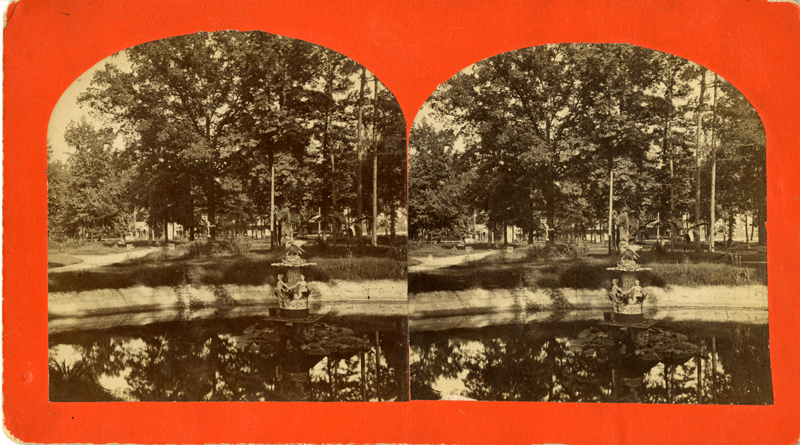
Stereoscopic image of a pond in Central City Park, Macon, GA, c. 1877.

A pond is a small, still, land-based body of water formed by pooling inside a depression, either naturally or artificially. A pond is smaller than a lake and there are no official criteria distinguishing the two, although defining a pond to be less than 5 hectares (12 acres) in area, less than 5 metres (16 ft) in depth and with less than 30% of its area covered by emergent vegetation helps in distinguishing the ecology of ponds from those of lakes and wetlands.

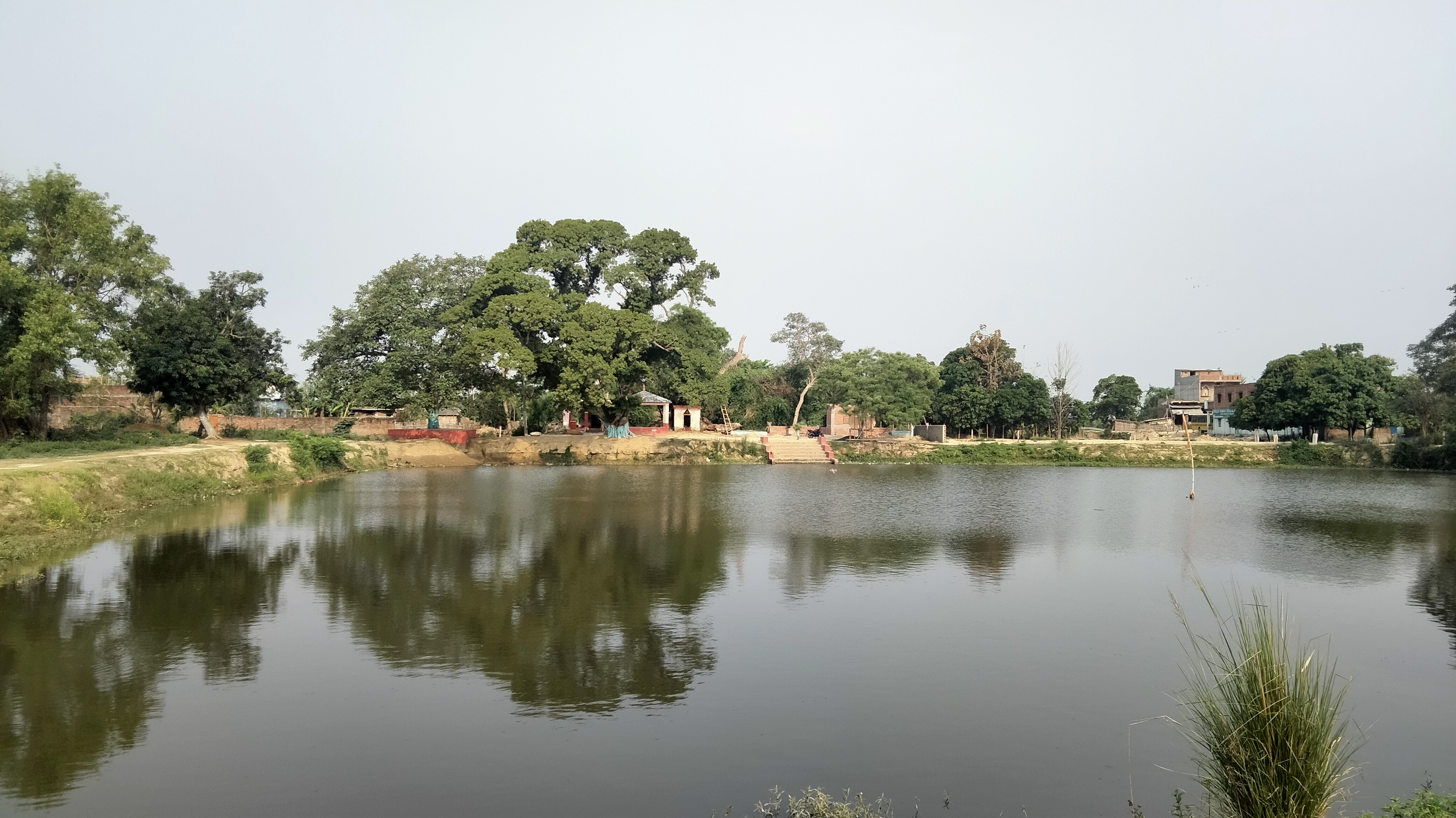
A typical Indian pond in the Mithila region. View of the Chaudhary Pokhair at the premises of the Basuki Nath Mahadev Mandir in Basuki Bihari village of India.

Ponds can be created by a wide variety of natural processes (e.g. on floodplains as cutoff river channels, by glacial processes, by peatland formation, in coastal dune systems, by beavers). They can simply be isolated depressions (such as a kettle hole, vernal pool, prairie pothole, or simply natural undulations in undrained land) filled by runoff, groundwater, or precipitation, or all three of these.Clegg, John (1986). The new observer's book of pond life (4th ed.). Harmondsworth: Frederick Warne. ISBN 0-7232-3338-1. OCLC 15197655.</ref> They can be further divided into four zones: vegetation zone, open water, bottom mud and surface film.

The size and depth of ponds often varies greatly with the time of year; many ponds are produced by spring flooding from rivers. Ponds are usually freshwater, but may be brackish in nature. Saltwater pools, with a direct connection to the sea to maintain full salinity, may sometimes be called 'ponds' but these are normally regarded as part of the marine environment. They do not support fresh or brackish water-based organisms, and are rather tidal pools or lagoons.

Ponds are typically shallow water bodies with varying abundances of aquatic plants and animals. Depth, seasonal water level variations, nutrient fluxes, amount of light reaching the ponds, the shape, the presence of visiting large mammals, the composition of any fish communities and salinity can all affect the types of plant and animal communities present. Food webs are based both on free-floating algae and upon aquatic plants. There is usually a diverse array of aquatic life, with a few examples including algae, snails, fish, beetles, water bugs, frogs, turtles, otters, and muskrats. Top predators may include large fish, herons, or alligators. Since fish are a major predator upon amphibian larvae, ponds that dry up each year, thereby killing resident fish, provide important refugia for amphibian breeding. Ponds that dry up completely each year are often known as vernal pools. Some ponds are produced by animal activity, including alligator holes and beaver ponds, and these add important diversity to landscapes.

Ponds are frequently man made or expanded beyond their original depths and bounds by anthropogenic causes. Apart from their role as highly biodiverse, fundamentally natural, freshwater ecosystems ponds have had, and still have, many uses, including providing water for agriculture, livestock and communities, aiding in habitat restoration, serving as breeding grounds for local and migrating species, decorative components of landscape architecture, flood control basins, general urbanization, interception basins for pollutants and sources and sinks of greenhouse gases.

== Classification ==
The technical distinction between a pond and a lake has not been universally standardized. Limnologists and freshwater biologists have proposed formal definitions for pond, in part to include 'bodies of water where light penetrates to the bottom of the waterbody', 'bodies of water shallow enough for rooted water plants to grow throughout', and 'bodies of water which lack wave action on the shoreline'. Each of these definitions are difficult to measure or verify in practice and are of limited practical use, and are mostly not now used. Accordingly, some organizations and researchers have settled on technical definitions of pond and lake that rely on size alone.

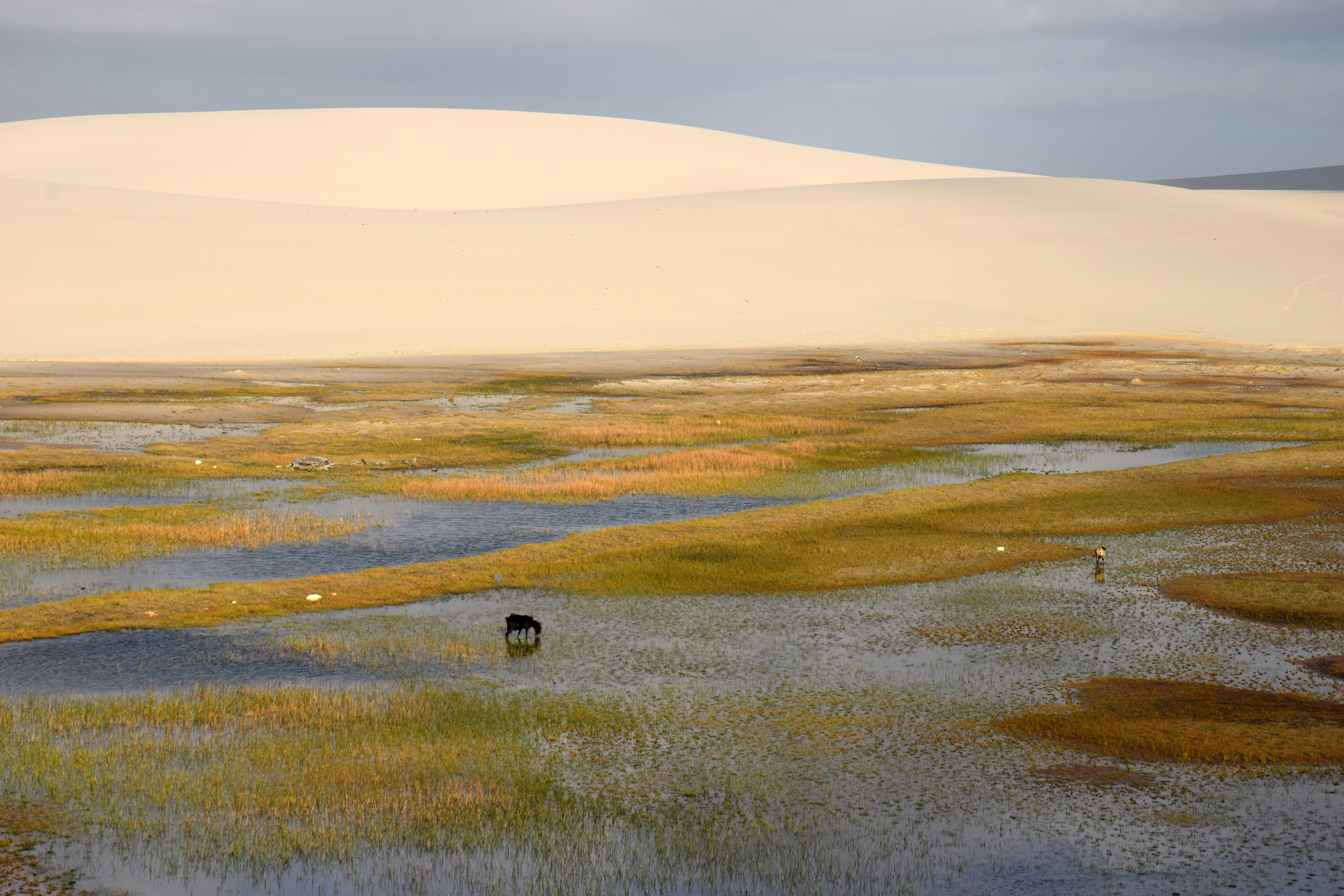
Vegetated pond within the sand dunes of the Lençóis Maranhenses National Park, Brazil

Some regions of the United States define a pond as a body of water with a surface area of less than 10 acres (4.0 ha). Minnesota, known as the "land of 10,000 lakes", is commonly said to distinguish lakes from ponds, bogs and other water features by this definition, but also says that a lake is distinguished primarily by wave action reaching the shore. Even among organizations and researchers who distinguish lakes from ponds by size alone, there is no universally recognized standard for the maximum size of a pond. The international Ramsar wetland convention sets the upper limit for pond size as 8 hectares (80,000 m^{2}; 20 acres). Researchers for the British charity Pond Conservation (now called Freshwater Habitats Trust) have defined a pond to be 'a man-made or natural waterbody that is between 1 m^{2} (0.00010 hectares; 0.00025 acres) and 20,000 m^{2} (2.0 hectares; 4.9 acres) in area, which holds water for four months of the year or more.' Other European biologists have set the upper size limit at 5 hectares (50,000 m^{2}; 12 acres).

In North America, even larger bodies of water have been called ponds; for example, Crystal Lake at 33 acres (130,000 m^{2}; 13 ha), Walden Pond in Concord, Massachusetts at 61 acres (250,000 m^{2}; 25 ha), and nearby Spot Pond at 340 acres (140 ha). There are numerous examples in other states, where bodies of water less than 10 acres (40,000 m^{2}; 4.0 ha) are being called lakes. As the case of Crystal Lake shows, marketing purposes can sometimes be the driving factor behind the categorization.

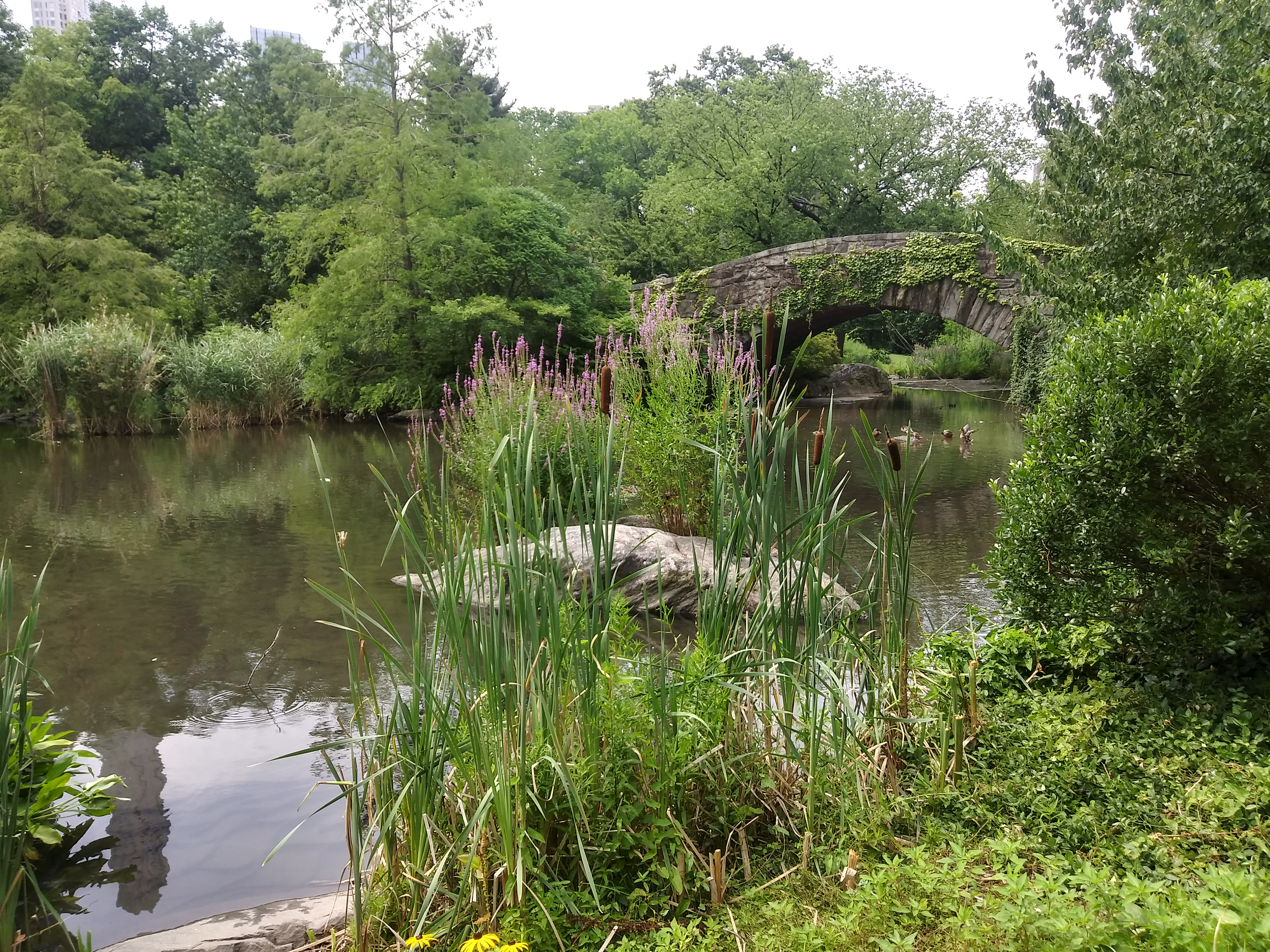
The Pond in Central Park in Manhattan, New York City

In practice, a body of water is called a pond or a lake on an individual basis, as conventions change from place to place and over time. In origin, a pond is a variant form of the word pound, meaning a confining enclosure. In earlier times, ponds were artificial and utilitarian, as stew ponds, mill ponds and so on. The significance of this feature seems, in some cases, to have been lost when the word was carried abroad with emigrants. However, some parts of New England contain "ponds" that are actually the size of a small lake when compared to other countries. In the United States, natural pools are often called ponds. Ponds for a specific purpose keep the adjective, such as "stock pond", used for watering livestock. The term is also used for temporary accumulation of water from surface runoff (ponded water).

There are various regional names for naturally occurring ponds. In Scotland, one of the terms is lochan, which may also apply to a large body of water such as a lake. In the South Western parts of North American, lakes or ponds that are temporary and often dried up for most parts of the year are called playas. These playas are simply shallow depressions in dry areas that may only fill with water on certain occasion like excess local drainage, groundwater seeping, or rain.

== Formation ==
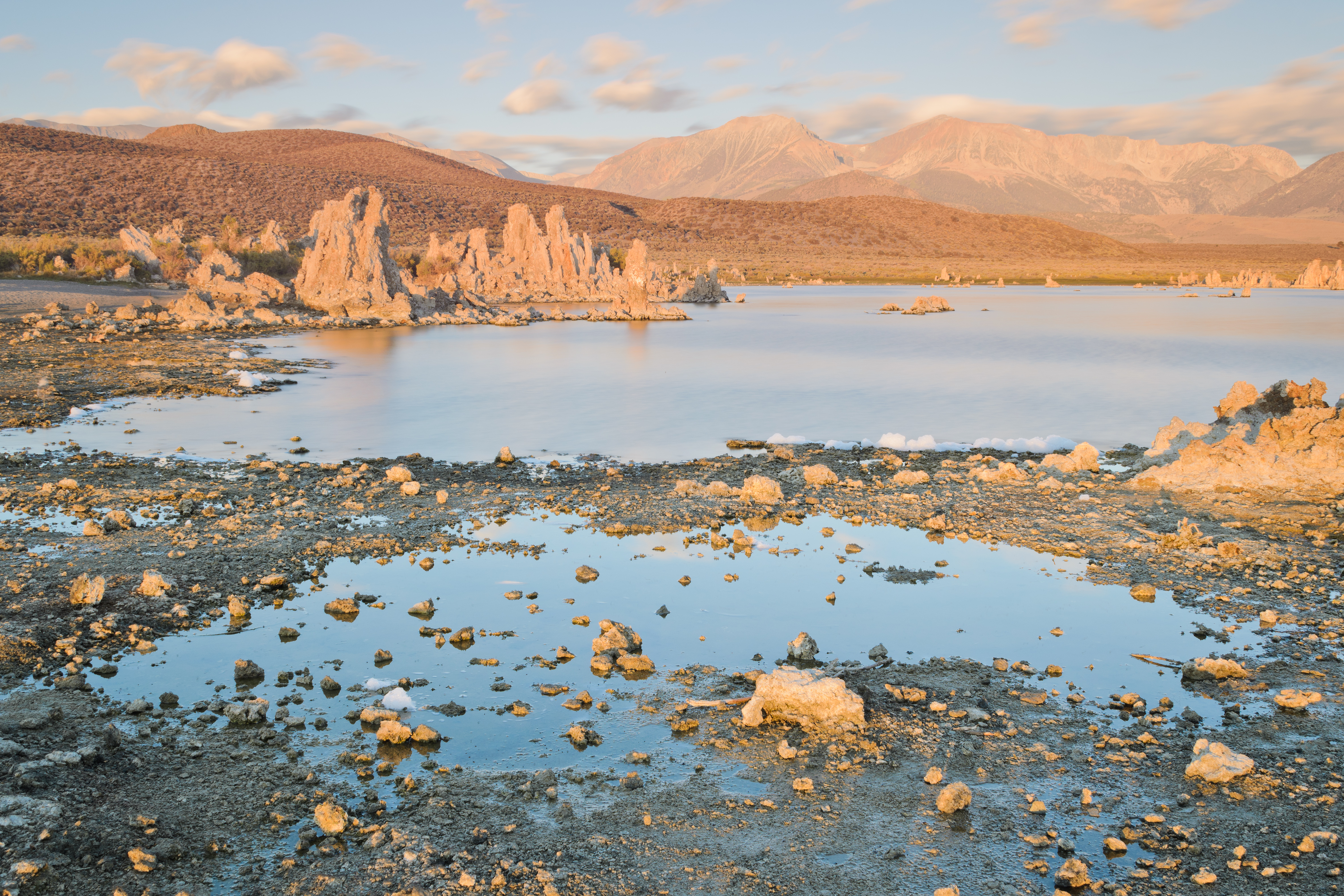
Pond formation through seeping groundwater in South Tufa, California

Any depression in the ground which collects and retains a sufficient amount of water can be considered a pond, and such, can be formed by a variety of geological, ecological, and human terraforming events.

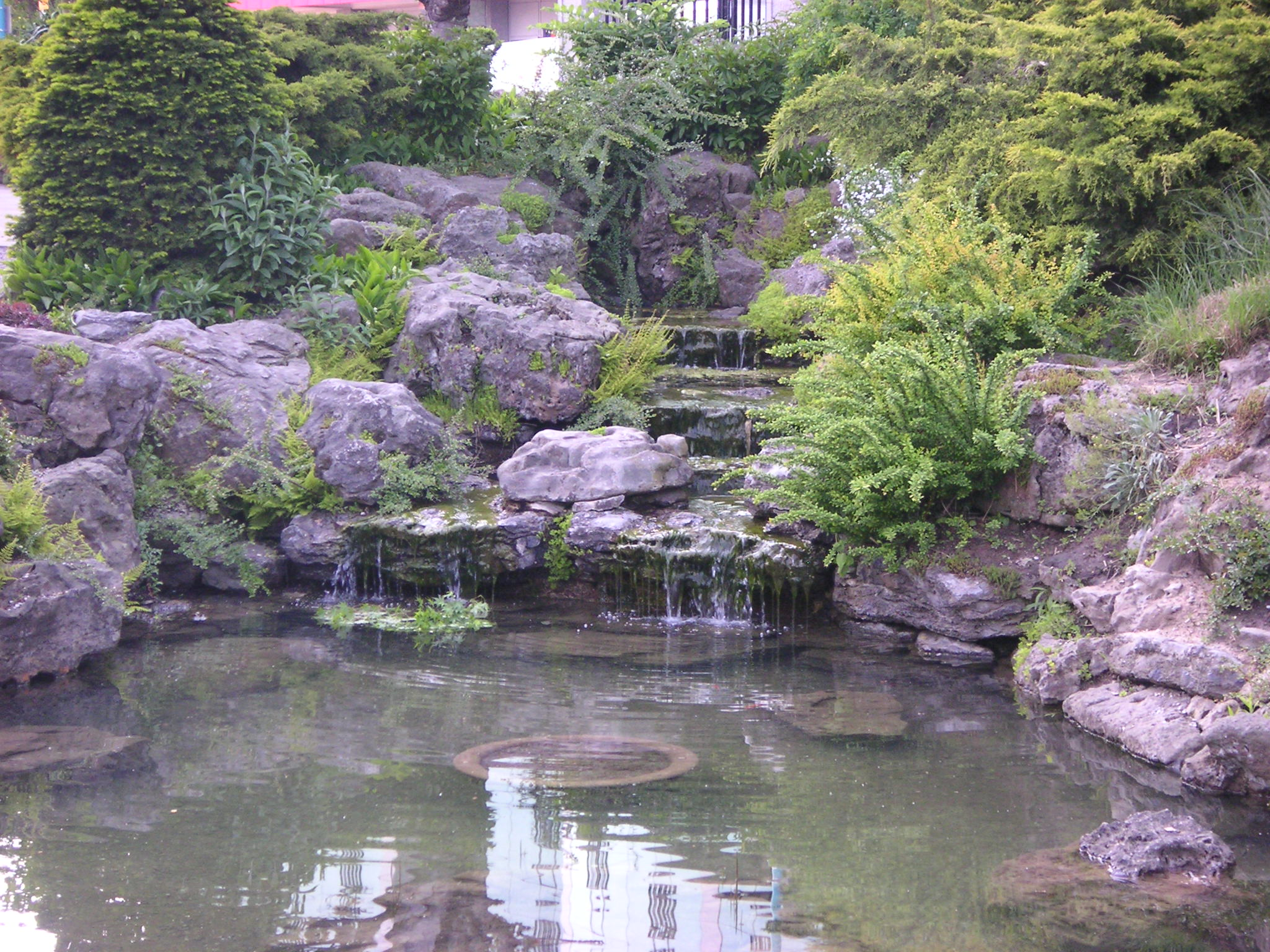
Ornamental pond with waterfall in Niagara Falls Rock Garden

Natural ponds are those caused by environmental occurrences. These can vary from glacial, volcanic, fluvial, or even tectonic events. Since the Pleistocene epoch, glacial processes have created most of the Northern hemispheric ponds; an example is the Prairie Pothole Region of North America. When glaciers retreat, they may leave behind uneven ground due to bedrock elastic rebound and sediment outwash plains. These areas may develop depressions that can fill up with excess precipitation or seeping ground water, forming a small pond. Kettle lakes and ponds are formed when ice breaks off from a larger glacier, is eventually buried by the surrounding glacial till, and over time melts. Orogenies and other tectonic uplifting events have created some of the oldest lakes and ponds on the globe. These indentions have the tendency to quickly fill with groundwater if they occur below the local water table. Other tectonic rifts or depressions can fill with precipitation, local mountain runoff, or be fed by mountain streams. Volcanic activity can also lead to lake and pond formation through collapsed lava tubes or volcanic cones. Natural floodplains along rivers, as well as landscapes that contain many depressions, may experience spring/rainy season flooding and snow melt. Temporary or vernal ponds are created this way and are important for breeding fish, insects, and amphibians, particularly in large river systems like the Amazon. Some ponds are created by beavers, bison, alligators, and other crocodilians through damming and nest excavation respectively. In landscapes with organic soils, local fires can create depressions during periods of drought. These may fill up with small amounts of precipitation until normal water levels return, turning these isolated ponds into open water.

Manmade ponds are created by human intervention for the sake of the local environment, industrial settings, or for recreational/ornamental use.

== Uses ==
Many ecosystems are linked by water and ponds have been found to hold a greater biodiversity of species than larger freshwater lakes or river systems. As such, ponds are habitats for many varieties of organisms including plants, amphibians, fish, reptiles, waterfowl, insects, and even some mammals. Ponds are used for breeding grounds for these species but also as shelter and even drinking/feeding locations for other wildlife. Aquaculture practices lean heavily on artificial ponds in order to grow and care for many different type of fish either for human consumption, research, species conservation or recreational sport.

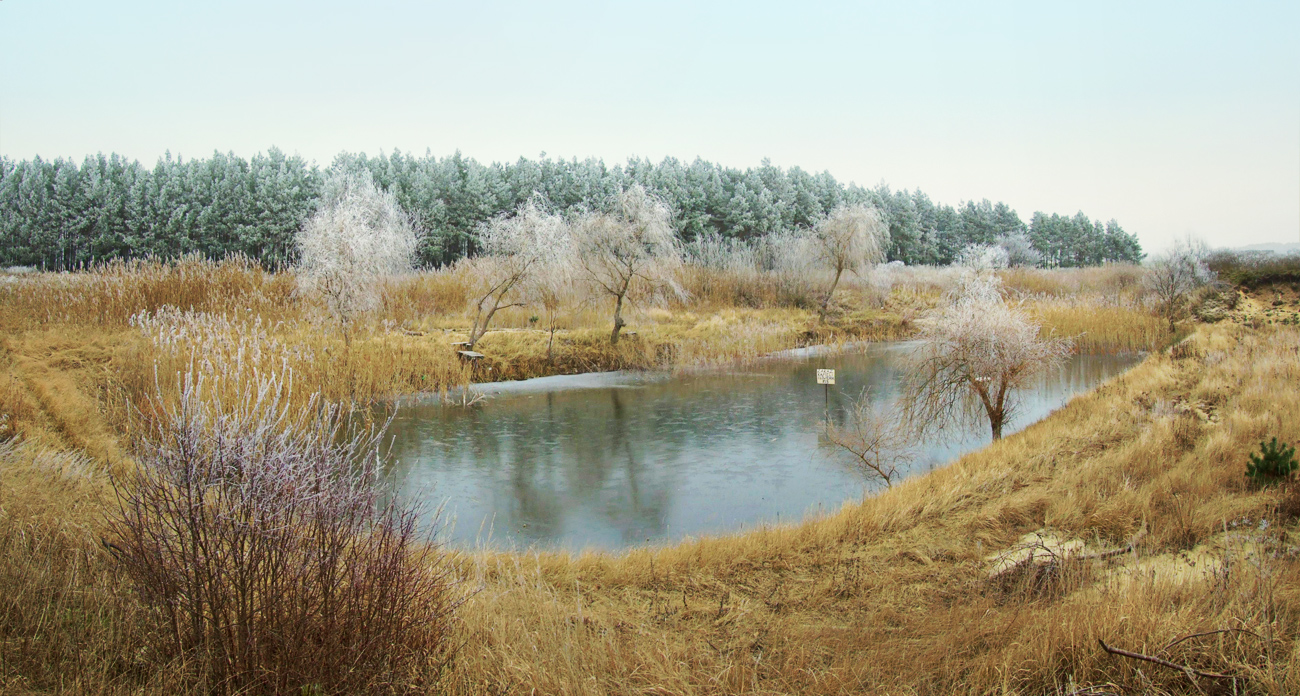
A small agricultural retention pond in Swarzynice, Poland

In agriculture practices, treatment ponds can be created to reduce nutrient runoff from reaching local streams or groundwater storages. Pollutants that enter ponds can often be mitigated by natural sedimentation and other biological and chemical activities within the water. As such, waste stabilization ponds are becoming popular low-cost methods for general wastewater treatment. They may also provide irrigation reservoirs for struggling farms during times of drought.

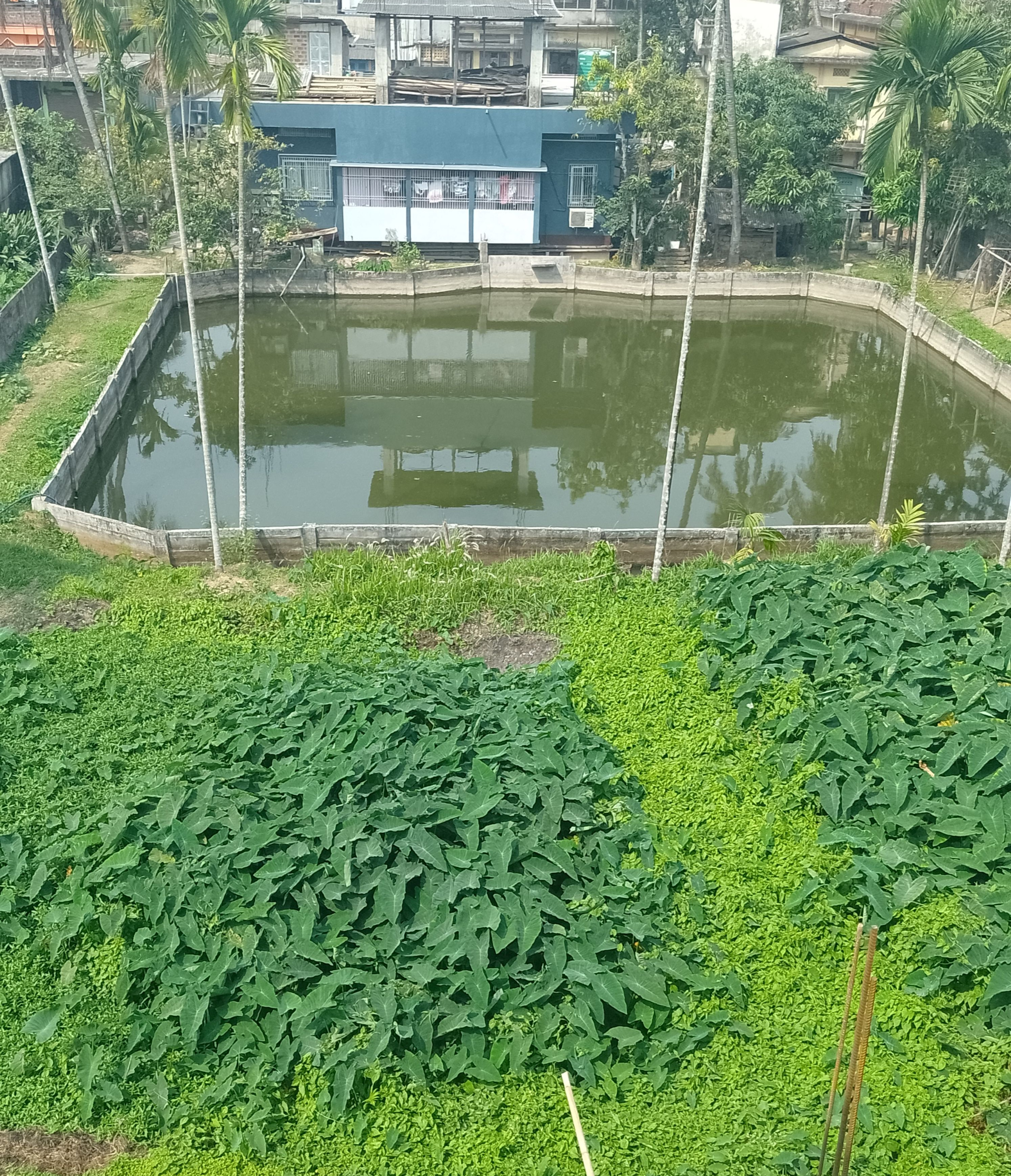
A Retention pond guarded by concrete wall and surrounded by Taro plants in an urban area

As urbanization continues to spread, retention ponds are becoming more common in new housing developments. These ponds reduce the risk of flooding and erosion damage from excess storm water runoff in local communities.

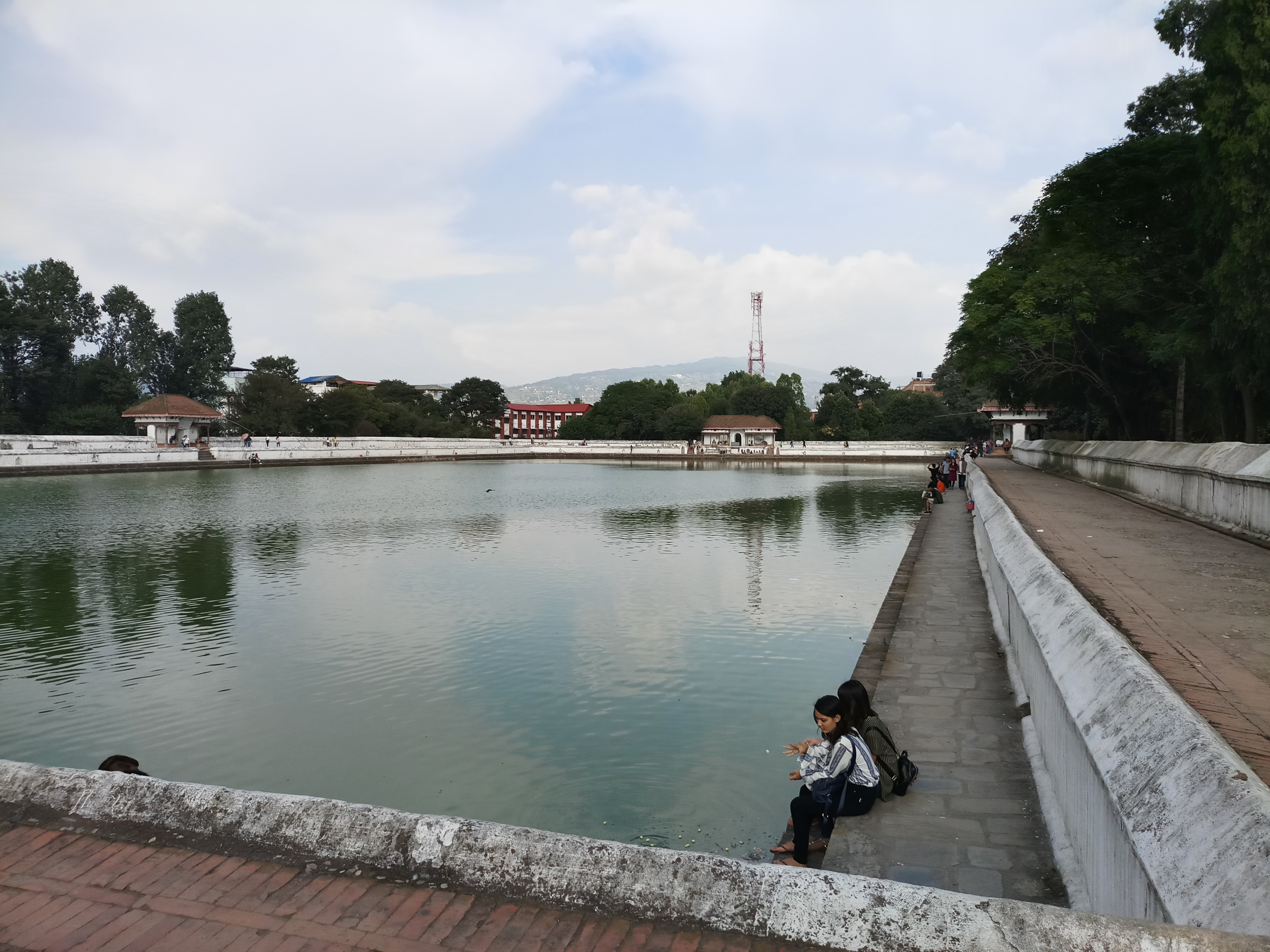
Siddha Pokhari, a reservoir pond in Bhaktapur, Nepal

Experimental ponds are used to test hypotheses in the fields of environmental science, chemistry, aquatic biology, and limnology.

Some ponds are the life blood of many small villages in arid countries such as those in sub-Saharan Africa where bathing, sanitation, fishing, socialization, and rituals are held. In the Indian subcontinent, Hindu temple monks care for sacred ponds used for religious practices and bathing pilgrims alike. In Europe during medieval times, it was typical for many monasteries and castles (small, partly self-sufficient communities) to have fish ponds. These are still common in Europe and in East Asia (notably Japan), where koi may be kept or raised.

In Nepal artificial ponds were essential elements of the ancient drinking water supply system. These ponds were fed with rainwater, water coming in through canals, their own springs, or a combination of these sources. They were designed to retain the water, while at the same time letting some water seep away to feed the local aquifers.

== Pond biodiversity ==
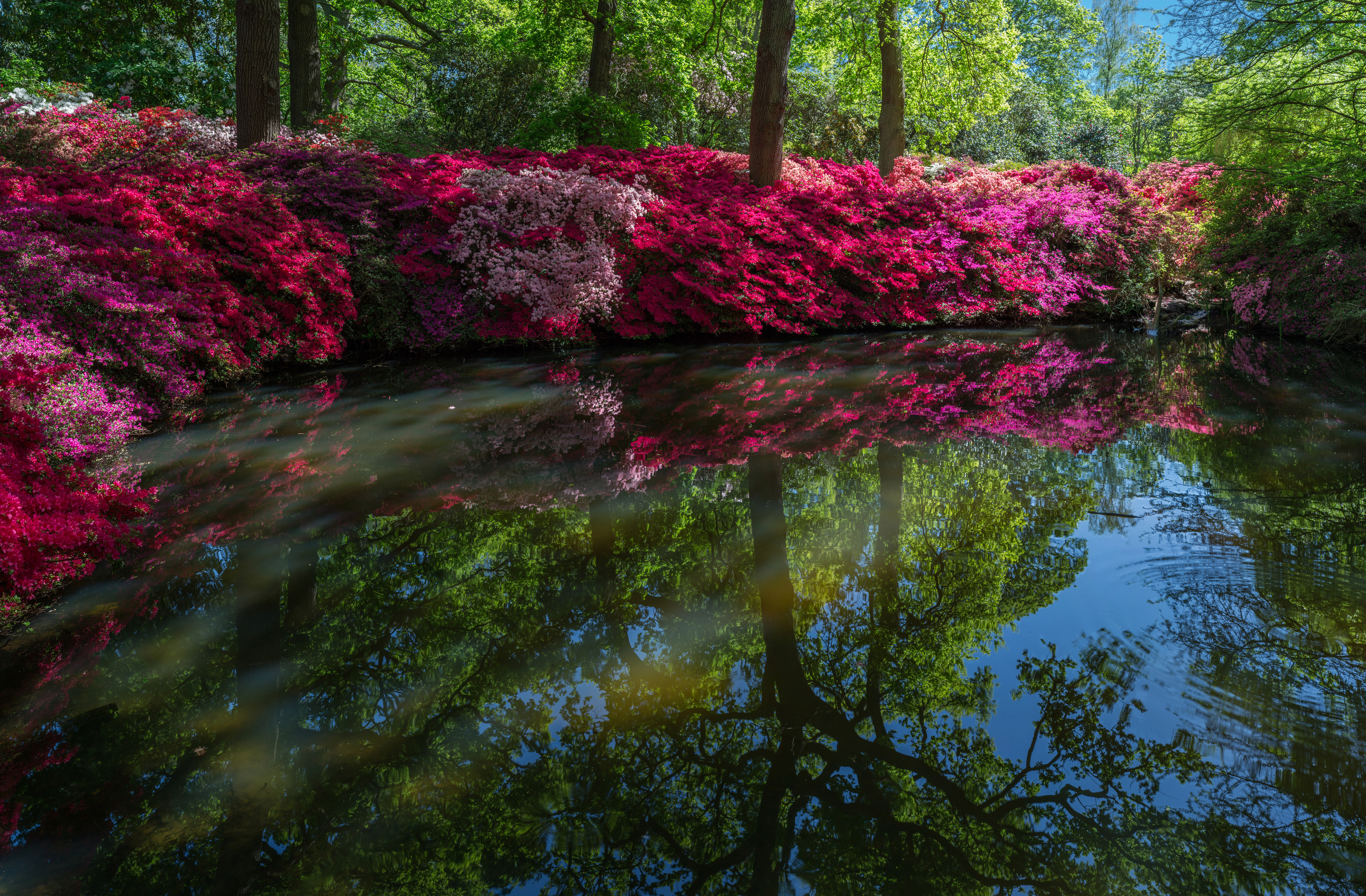
Azalea flowers around a still pond in London's Richmond Park

A defining feature of a pond is the presence of standing water which provides habitat for a biological community commonly referred to as pond life. Because of this, many ponds and lakes contain large numbers of endemic species that have gone through adaptive radiation to become specialized to their preferred habitat. Familiar examples might include water lilies and other aquatic plants, frogs, turtles, and fish.

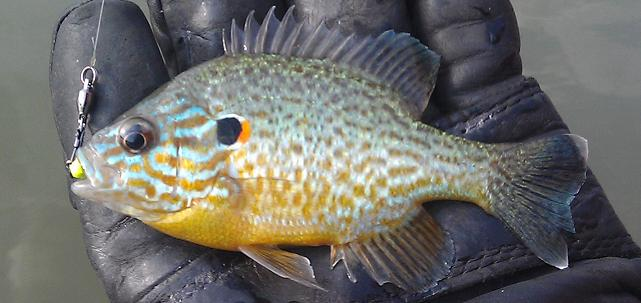
A pumpkinseed, a common species of sunfish found in ponds in North America

Often, the entire margin of the pond is fringed by wetland, and these wetlands support the aquatic food web, provide shelter for wildlife, and stabilize the shore of the pond. This margin is also known as the littoral zone and contains much of the photosynthetic algae and plants of this ecosystem called macrophytes. Other photosynthetic organisms such as phytoplankton (suspended algae) and periphytons (organisms including cyanobacteria, detritus, and other microbes) thrive here and stand as the primary producers of pond food webs. Some grazing animals like geese and muskrats consume the wetland plants directly as a source of food. In many other cases, pond plants will decay in the water. Many invertebrates and herbivorous zooplankton then feed on the decaying plants, and these lower trophic level organisms provide food for wetland species including fish, dragonflies, and herons both in the littoral zone and the limnetic zone. The open water limnetic zone may allow algae to grow as sunlight still penetrates here. These algae may support yet another food web that includes aquatic insects and other small fish species. A pond, therefore, may have combinations of three different food webs, one based on larger plants, one based upon decayed plants, and one based upon algae and their specific upper trophic level consumers and predators. Ponds are vital for bats as they offer indispensable drinking water and attract abundant insect prey, thereby sustaining bat activity throughout the year. Hence, ponds often have many different animal species using the wide array of food sources though biotic interaction. They, therefore, provide an important source of biological diversity in landscapes.

Opposite to long standing ponds are vernal ponds. These ponds dry up for part of the year and are so called because they are typically at their peak depth in the spring (the meaning of "vernal" comes form the Latin word for spring). Naturally occurring vernal ponds do not usually have fish, a major higher tropic level consumer, as these ponds frequently dry up. The absence of fish is a very important characteristic of these ponds since it prevents long chained biotic interactions from establishing. Ponds without these competitive predation pressures provides breeding locations and safe havens for endangered or migrating species. Hence, introducing fish to a pond can have seriously detrimental consequences. In some parts of the world, such as California, the vernal ponds have rare and endangered plant species. On the coastal plain, they provide habitat for endangered frogs such as the Mississippi Gopher Frog.

Often groups of ponds in a given landscape - so called 'pondscapes' - offer especially high biodiversity benefits compared to single ponds. A group of ponds provides a higher degree of habitat complexity and habitat connectivity.

== Stratification ==
Lakes are stratified into three separate sections: I. The Epilimnion II. The Metalimnion III. The Hypolimnion. The scales are used to associate each section of the stratification to their corresponding depths and temperatures. The arrow is used to show the movement of wind over the surface of the water which initiates the turnover in the epilimnion and the hypolimnion.

Many ponds undergo a regular yearly process in the same manner as larger lakes if they are deep enough and/or protected from the wind. Abiotic factors such as UV radiation, general temperature, wind speed, water density, and even size, all have important roles to play when it comes to the seasonal effects on lakes and ponds. Spring overturn, summer stratification, autumn turnover, and an inverse winter stratification, ponds adjust their stratification or their vertical zonation of temperature due to these influences. These environmental factors affect pond circulation and temperature gradients within the water itself producing distant layers; the epilimnion, metalimnion, and hypolimnion.

A pond in winter experiencing inverse stratification

Each zone has varied traits that sustain or harm specific organisms and biotic interactions below the surface depending on the season. Winter surface ice begins to melt in the Spring. This allows the water column to begin mixing thanks to solar convection and wind velocity. As the pond mixes, an overall constant temperature is reached. As temperatures increase through the summer, thermal stratification takes place. Summer stratification allows for the epilimnion to be mixed by winds, keeping a consistent warm temperature throughout this zone. Here, photosynthesis and primary production flourishes. However, those species that need cooler water with higher dissolved oxygen concentrations will favor the lower metalimnion or hypolimnion. Air temperature drops as fall approaches and a deep mixing layer occurs. Autumn turnover results in isothermal lakes with high levels of dissolved oxygen as the water reaches an average colder temperature. Finally, winter stratification occurs inversely to summer stratification as surface ice begins to form yet again. This ice cover remains until solar radiation and convection return in the spring.

Due to this constant change in vertical zonation, seasonal stratification causes habitats to grow and shrink accordingly. Certain species are bound to these distinct layers of the water column where they can thrive and survive with the best efficiency possible.

For more information regarding seasonal thermal stratification of ponds and lakes, please look at "Lake Stratification".

== Conservation and management ==
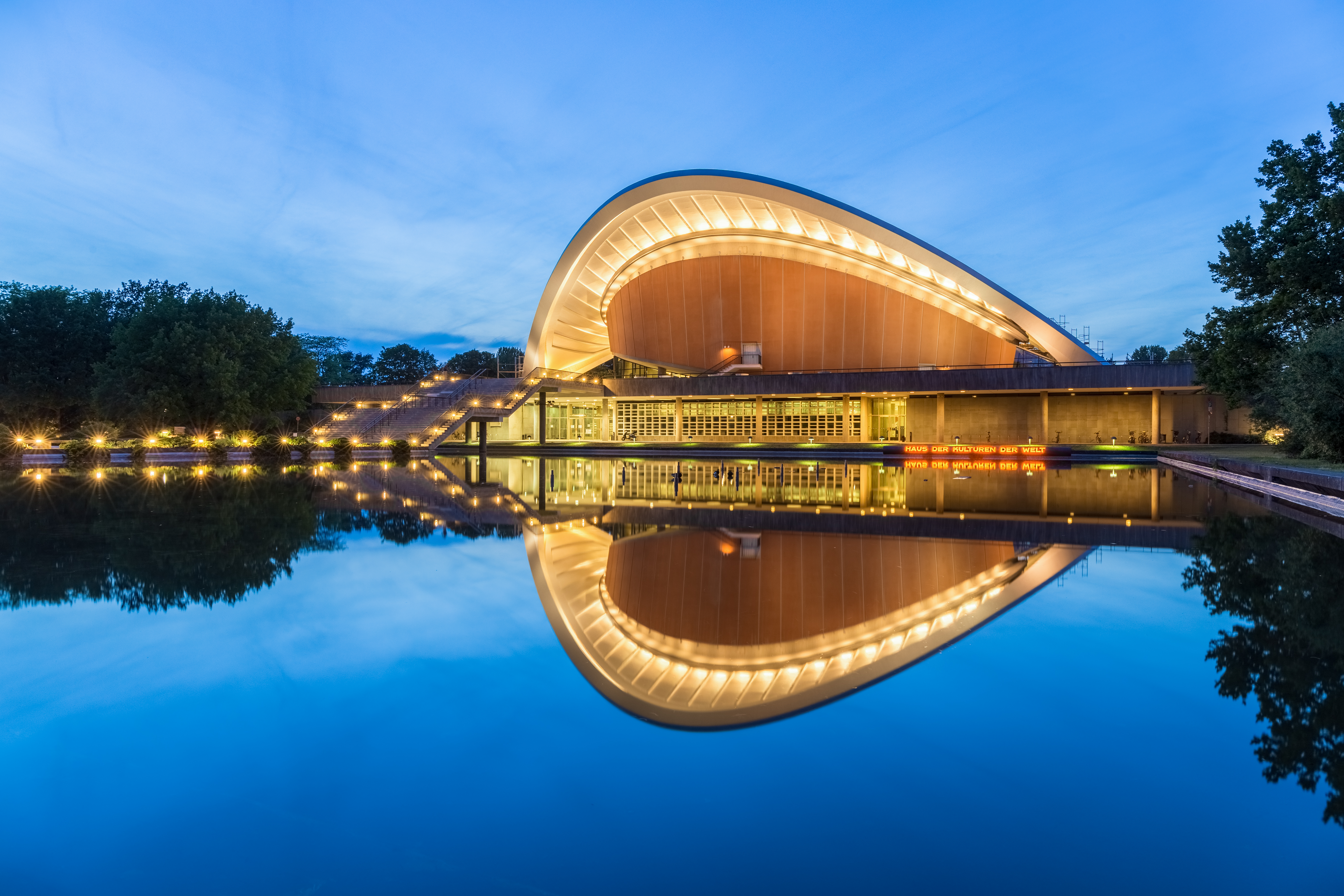
Artificial pond in front of the Haus der Kulturen der Welt, Berlin, Germany

Ponds provide not only environmental values, but practical benefits to society. One increasingly crucial benefit that ponds provide is their ability to act as greenhouse gas sinks. Most natural lakes and ponds are greenhouse gas sources and aid in the flux of these dissolved compounds. However, manmade farm ponds are becoming significant sinks for gas mitigation and the fight against climate change. These agriculture runoff ponds receive high pH level water from surrounding soils. Highly acidic drainage ponds act as catalysis for excess CO_{2} (carbon dioxide) to be converted into forms of carbon that can easily be stored in sediments. When these new drainage ponds are constructed, concentrations of bacteria that normally break down dead organic matter, such as algae, are low. As a result, breakdown and release of nitrogen gases from these organic materials such as N_{2}O does not occur and thus, not added to our atmosphere. This process is also used with regular denitrification in anoxic layer of ponds. However, not all ponds have the ability to become sinks for greenhouse gasses. Most ponds experience eutrophication where faced with excessive nutrient input from fertilizers and runoff. This over-nitrifies the pond water and results in mass algae blooms and local fish kills.

Some farm ponds are not used for runoff control but rather for livestock like cattle or buffalo as watering and bathing holes. As mentioned in the use section, ponds are important hotspots for biodiversity. Sometimes this becomes an issue with invasive or introduced species that disrupt pond ecosystem dynamics such as food-web structure, niche partitioning, and guild assignments. This varies from introduced fish species such as the Common Carp that eat native water plants or Northern Snakeheads that attack breeding amphibians, aquatic snails that carry infectious parasites that kill other species, and even rapid spreading aquatic plants like Hydrilla and Duckweed that can restrict water flow and cause overbank flooding.

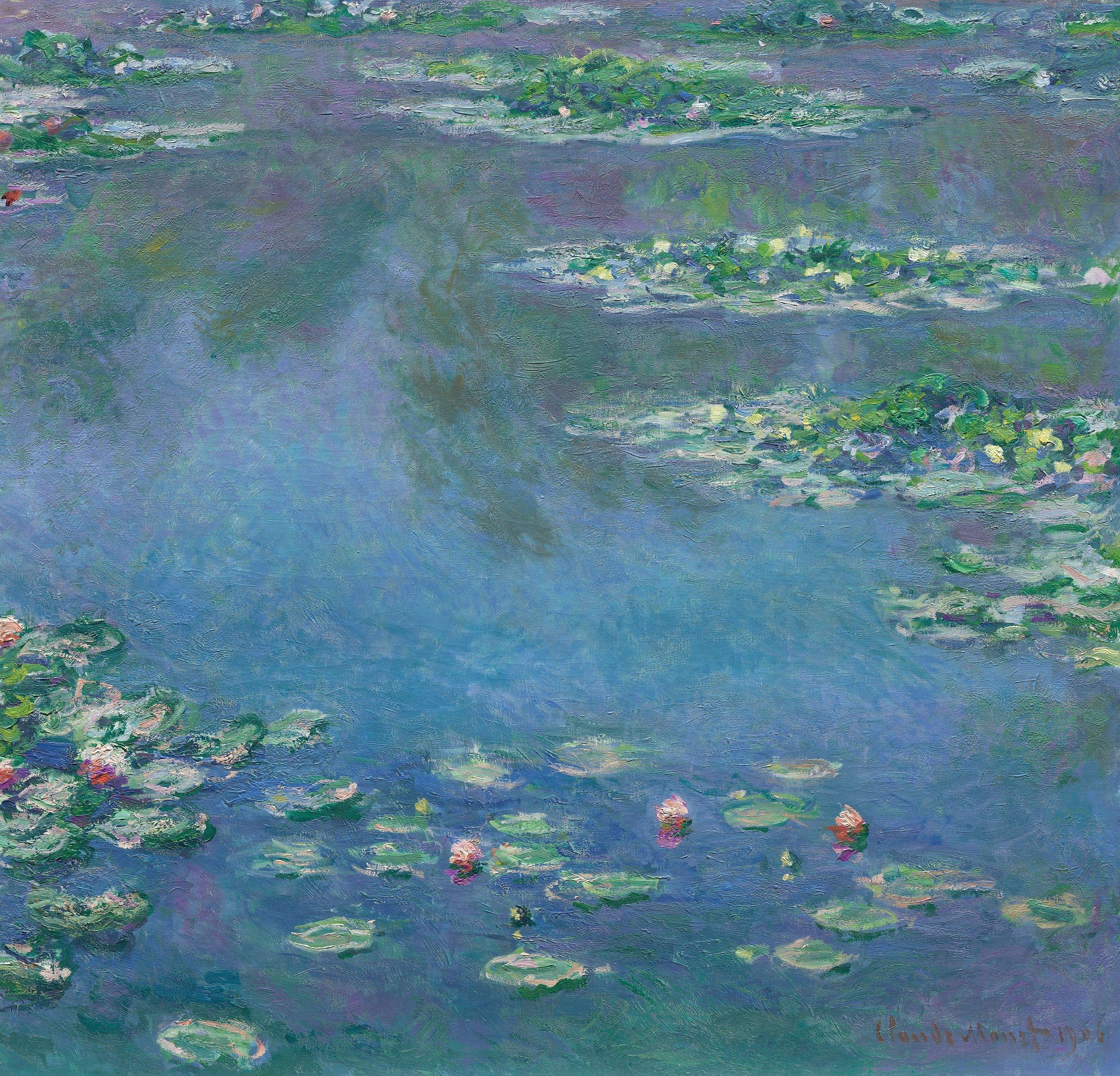
During the last thirty years of his life, the main focus of Claude Monet's artistic production was a series of about 250 oil paintings depicting the lily pond in his flower garden.

Ponds, depending on their orientation and size, can spread their wetland habitats into the local riparian zones or watershed boundaries. Gentle slopes of land into ponds provides an expanse of habitat for wetland plants and wet meadows to expand beyond the limitation of the pond. However, the construction of retaining walls, lawns, and other urbanized developments can severely degrade the range of pond habitats and the longevity of the pond itself. Roads and highways act in the same manor, but they also interfere with amphibians and turtles that migrate to and from ponds as part of their annual breeding cycle and should be kept as far away from established ponds as possible. Because of these factors, gently sloping shorelines with broad expanses of wetland plants not only provide the best conditions for wildlife, but they help protect water quality from sources in the surrounding landscapes. It is also beneficial to allow water levels to fall each year during drier periods in order to re-establish these gentile shorelines.

In landscapes where ponds are artificially constructed, they are done so to provide wildlife viewing and conservation opportunities, to treat wastewater, for sequestration and pollution containment, or for simply aesthetic purposes. For natural pond conservation and development, one way to stimulate this is with general stream and river restoration. Many small rivers and streams feed into or from local ponds within the same watershed. When these rivers and streams flood and begin to meander, large numbers of natural ponds, including vernal pools and wetlands, develop.

== Examples ==
Some notable ponds are:

- Rani Pokhari, 17th-century artificial pond in Kathmandu, Nepal
- Gangasagar, Janakpur, Mithila region, Nepal
- Big Pond, Nova Scotia, Canada
- Christian Pond, Wyoming, United States
- Walden Pond, Massachusetts, United States, associated with Henry David Thoreau
- Hampstead Ponds, London
- Kuttam Pokuna, Medieval artificial pond in Anuradhapura, Sri Lanka
- Rožmberk Pond, Czech Republic

== See also ==
- Cypress dome – Swamp dominated by pond or bald cypress
- Garden pond – Water feature in gardens
- Treatment pond
- Water garden – Garden with water as a main feature
- Water pan – Shallow pond or reservoir for arid areas
