= Christian Pond =

Lake in Wyoming, United States

- Location within Wyoming Location within the United States
- Location: Grand Teton National Park, Teton County, Wyoming, US
- Coordinates: 43°52′37″N 110°33′58″W
- Basin countries: United States
- Max. depth: 6.6 ft (2 m)
- Surface elevation: 6,818 ft (2,078 m)

Christian Pond is a small freshwater lake in Grand Teton National Park in the U.S. state of Wyoming. The pond is known for its diversity of waterfowl including the trumpeter swans which nest here. The pond is named after the original homesteader of the property, Charlie Christian. The shallowness of the pond results in summer water temperatures that are typically warmer than most lakes in Grand Teton National Park. Turbidity is low and pH levels are typically in the range of 9.6 (slightly alkaline). The pond is partially covered by water lilies and has a 3.2 mile circumferential trail.
