= Cuvelai-Etosha Basin =

Wetland area in Angola and Namibia

- Area
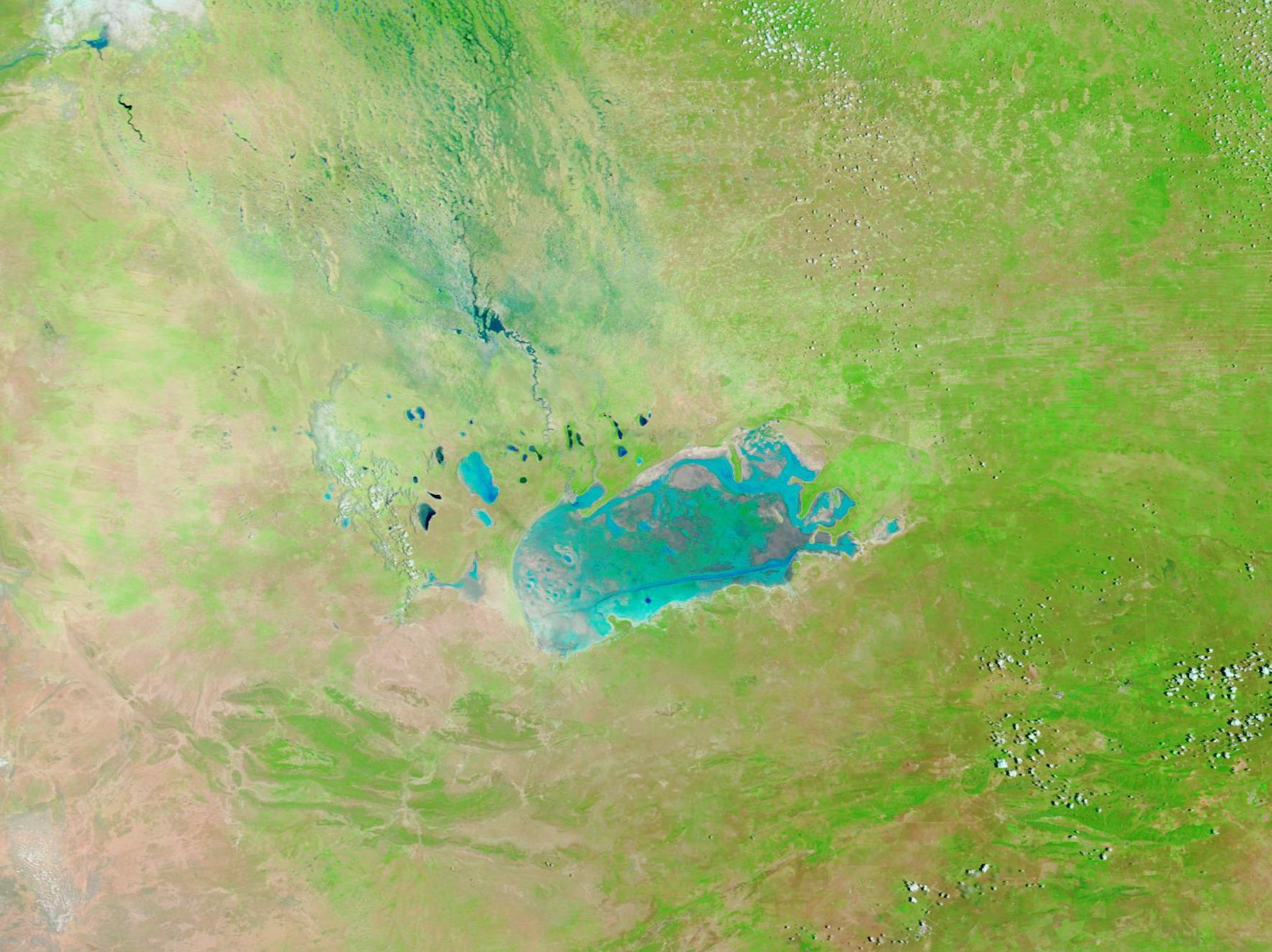
- Countries: Angola, Namibia

Area
  - Total: 160,000 km^{2} (62,000 sq mi)

Dimensions
  - Length: 450 km (280 mi)

Population
  - Total: 850,000

The Cuvelai-Etosha Basin is a transboundary wetland area shared by Angola and Namibia extending over 450 kilometres from north to south. Covering almost 160,000 km^{2}, the widest point of the basin is along the Angola-Namibia border from the Kunene River east to the Okavango River.

The basin consists of hundreds of drainage channels, known as iishana (singular oshana), that flow from north to south from the southern Angolan highlands to Namibia's Etosha pan. Many of these channels are dry for most of the year but are prone to major flooding during the rainy season due to the terrain being extremely flat. Most of the basin lies between 1,100 and 1,200 metres above sea level with little change in altitude.

Located in the north-central part of Namibia, this drainage basin stretches across four regions, namely Ohangwena, Omusati, Oshana and Oshikoto. The basin is further divided into four sub-basins, namely Olushandja, Lishana, Nipele and Tsumeb.

== People ==
There is an estimated 1.2 million people that live in the basin with about 70% in Namibia and 30% in Angola.

In Namibia, the basin covers around 5% of the country, yet about 40% of Namibia's population lives here with around 850,000 people. The basin is traditionally dominated by the Owambo people and so is often referred to as the Owambo Basin by geologists.
