= Otjikoto Biomass Power Station =

Biomass power station in Namibia

- Otjikoto Biomass Power Station
- Official name: Otjikoto Biomass Power Station
- Country: Namibia
- Location: Tsumeb, Oshikoto Region
- Coordinates: 19°13′26″S 17°42′30″E
- Status: Under construction
- Construction began: 2024
- Commission date: 2027 Expected
- Construction cost: US$152 million
- Owner: NamPower

Thermal power station
- Primary fuel: Biomass

Power generation
- Nameplate capacity: 40 MW (54,000 hp)
- Capacity factor: 300 GWh

Otjikoto Biomass Power Station (OBPS), is a 40 MW (54,000 hp) biomass-fired thermal power plant under development in Namibia. The power station is owned and under development by NamPower, the national electricity utility company. As raw material, the power station is designed to use wood chips.

== Location ==
The power plant is under construction approximately 12 kilometres (7 mi), north of the town of Tsumeb, in the Oshikoto Region of Namibia. Tsumeb is located approximately 433 kilometres (269 mi) northeast of Windhoek, the largest city and national capital of the country.

== Overview ==
The 40 MW power-generating plant is designed to use as raw material, wood chips derived from shrubs and bushes that grow abundantly in the locality where the power station is located, as a result of woody plant encroachment. NamPower, the owner/developer of the power station intends to integrate the power generated here into the Namibian grid. The power station will burn wood chips to heat water and produce steam. The steam will then be used to turn turbines and generate electricity.

== Construction costs and funding ==
Financing was obtained from various sources as outlined in the table below. The construction budget is calculated as US$151.83 million.

Sources of Funding For Tsumeb Biomass Power Station
Rank	Funding Partner	Millions of US$	Percentage	Notes
1	French Development Agency	100.00	65.86	Loan
2	Mitigation Action Facility	26.96	17.76	Grant
3	Government of Namibia	21.64	14.25	Equity
4	French Facility for Global Environment	3.23	2.13	Grant
	Total	151.83	100.00	

== Contractor and timeline ==
The selected engineering, procurement and construction contractor is Dong Fang Electric International Corporation (DFEIC) of China. Construction was expected to start in H1 2024 and commercial commissioning is expected in Q1 2027. A groundbreaking ceremony was held on 15 November 2024 at the construction site.

== Ecocological and Social Support Measures ==
The Mitigation Action Facility and the French Facility for Global Environment co-fund a technical support measure to promote ecological restoration and social inclusion in the fuel supply chain of the Otjikoto Biomass Power Station. This measure is among others implemented by Namibia Nature Foundation and Namibia Biomass Industry Group.

== Macro-economic impacts ==
Several benefits are expected to accrue from this project including:

1. It has been estimated that around N$21 million (US$1.14 million) in economic benefits could be achieved, both through the commercial activity along the fuel supply chain and through improved ecosystem services, such as "increased groundwater recharge and improved agricultural productivity in harvested areas".
2. The project increases the country's generation capacity as it strives to become a net energy exporter by 2030.
3. This power station is part of Namibia's efforts to reduce dependency on imported electricity.

== See also ==
- List of power stations in Namibia
- Divo Biomass Power Station
- Otjikoto Solar Power Station
