= Corruption in Namibia =

Corruption in Namibia spans from the pre-colonial era to the present day. After independence in 1990, corruption and fraud issues continued, with cases involving misappropriation of state funds as well as resources, bribery and corruption in government tenders and contracts, and embezzlement of funds meant for social programs and development projects.

== Background ==
=== Pre-colonial era ===
Corruption existed in various forms, such as nepotism and embezzlement, within traditional societies. Tribal leaders and elders often abused their power for personal gain.

== Colonial era (1884-1990) ==
German and later South African colonial powers exploited Namibia's resources, fostering a culture of corruption. Corruption was institutionalized through apartheid policies, which favored white minority interests.

=== Exploitation of resources ===
Colonial powers exploited Namibia's natural resources, such as diamonds, copper, and livestock, for their own benefit. The exploitation of resources during Namibia's colonial times refers to the unfair and abusive extraction of the country's natural resources by colonial powers, particularly Germany and South Africa, for their own benefit. This exploitation was characterized by unfair land deals, where colonizers forcibly took land from indigenous people, often without compensation or consent, and used it for their own gain. Colonizers extracted natural resources such as diamonds, copper, and livestock without regard for environmental or social impacts. They also imposed unequal trade agreements, exploiting Namibia's resources while paying minimal royalties or taxes. Forced labor was another aspect of exploitation, where colonizers forced indigenous people to work in mines, farms, and other industries under harsh conditions and with minimal pay.

German colonial officials such as Governor Heinrich Göring, father of Hermann Göring, oversaw the exploitation of Namibia's resources. South African politicians such as Hendrik Verwoerd implemented policies to maintain apartheid and exploit Namibia's resources. Business leaders such as Sir Ernest Oppenheimer controlled the diamond industry and exploited Namibia's diamond resources. Cecil John Rhodes also played a significant role in the exploitation of Namibia's resources, particularly diamonds and land.

=== Land expropriation ===
Colonizers seized land from indigenous people, often through forced removals, displacement, and violence, leading to significant dispossession and disenfranchisement. Land expropriation during Namibia's colonial times refers to the forced removal of indigenous people from their land, which was then taken over by colonial powers for their own benefit. This process was often violent and involved the displacement of entire communities, leading to significant dispossession and disenfranchisement. German colonial officials, such as Governor Heinrich Göring, implemented policies aimed at taking control of land from indigenous people. They declared large areas "Crown Land" and forcibly removed people from their ancestral lands, leading to the loss of livelihoods, cultural heritage, and identity.

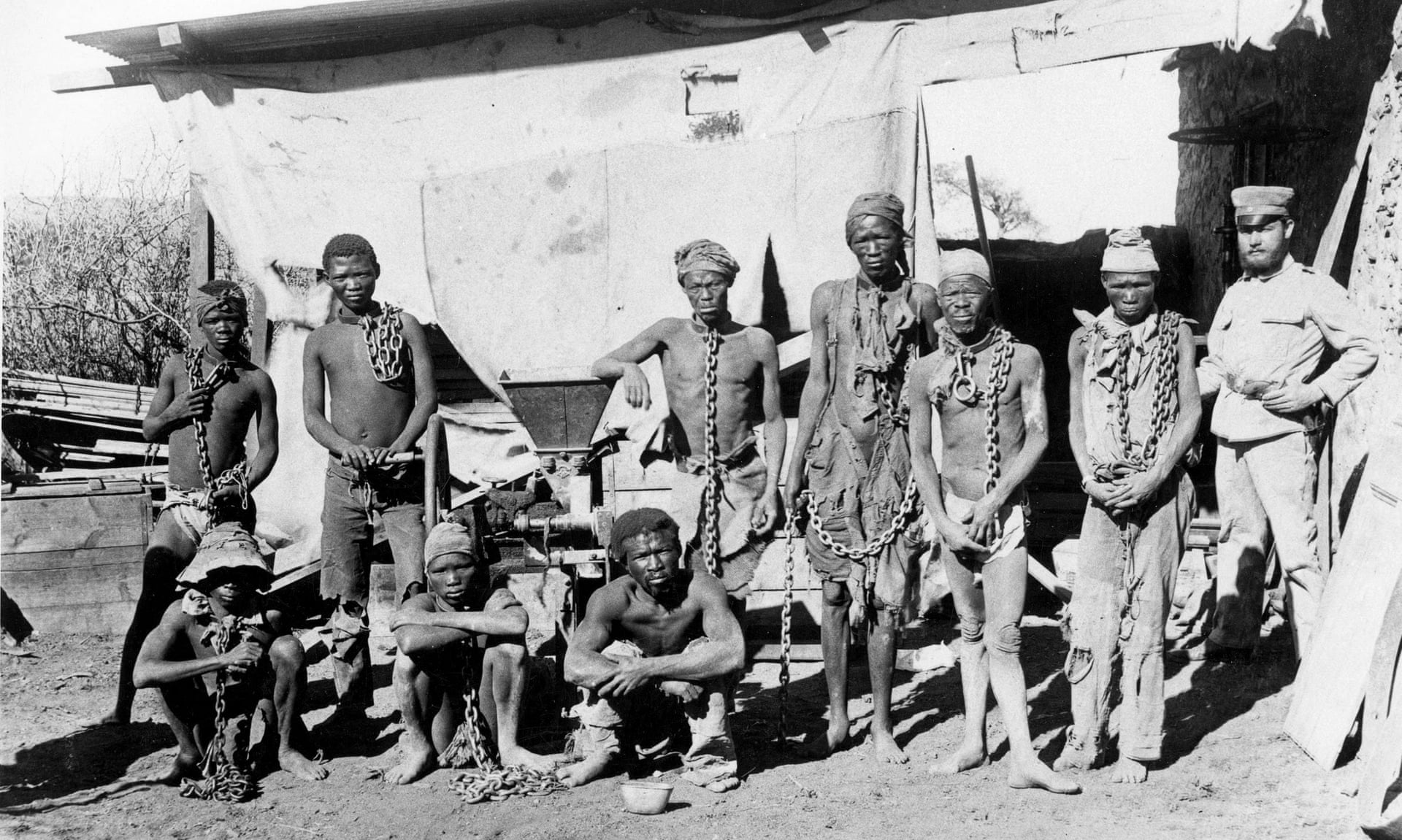
Prisoners from the Herero and Nama tribes during the 1904-1908 war against Germany.

The Herero and Nama genocide (1904–1908) is a notable example of land expropriation. German colonial troops forcibly removed Herero and Nama people from their land, leading to the deaths of tens of thousands of people. Survivors were forced into concentration camps, where they were subjected to forced labor, starvation, and brutal conditions.

The Odendaal Plan (1960s-1970s) is another example as South African officials, including Hendrik Verwoerd and B.J. Vorster, implemented a plan to forcibly remove indigenous people from their land, creating "homelands" or "Bantustans". This led to the displacement of hundreds of thousands of people, who were forced to live in poverty-stricken areas with limited access to resources.

Individuals involved in land expropriation include German colonial officials such as Heinrich Göring, who oversaw the forced removal of indigenous people from their land. Hendrik Verwoerd and B.J. Vorster implemented policies aimed at displacing indigenous people and taking control of their land. Land speculators and settlers also profited from the displacement of indigenous people and the takeover of their land.

=== Racial segregation ===
Apartheid policies institutionalized discrimination, with whites holding power and wealth, while blacks were marginalized and excluded from economic opportunities. Namibia's history of racial segregation, also known as apartheid, was a system of institutionalized racial discrimination and oppression enforced by the South African government from 1948 to 1990. This system was characterized by land dispossession, where indigenous people were forcibly removed from their land, which was then given to white settlers. Job reservation restricted certain jobs and industries to white people only. Separate development forced black people to live in poverty-stricken areas with limited access to resources. Pass laws required black people to carry identification documents at all times, restricting their movement. Bantu education provided substandard education to black children, designed to prepare them for menial labor.

Corruption was rampant during this period, with officials embezzling funds meant for development projects and accepting bribes from companies seeking favors. Hendrik Verwoerd, known as the "architect of apartheid," was a key figure in implementing and enforcing racial segregation policies. B.J. Vorster, a former police officer and Minister of Justice, oversaw the enforcement of apartheid laws and was implicated in corruption scandals. P.W. Botha, the last apartheid-era president, attempted to reform the system but ultimately perpetuated it. Magnus Malan, a former Minister of Defense, was involved in corruption and embezzlement related to arms deals. Adriaan Vlok, a former Minister of Law and Order, was implicated in human rights abuses and corruption.

=== Embezzlement and fraud ===
Colonial administrators and officials engaged in corrupt practices, such as embezzlement, fraud, and bribery, with impunity. During apartheid, embezzlement and fraud were used to siphon off funds meant for development projects in black townships, embezzle money from government departments and state-owned enterprises, and fraudulently acquire land and assets from indigenous people.

Former government minister Andimba Toivo ya Toivo was implicated in a corruption scandal involving the misappropriation of government funds. Ex-SWAPO politician Tessie Willemse was convicted of embezzling funds meant for social programs. Former CEO of the Namibia Development Corporation Kenneth Silver was accused of embezzling millions of dollars in government funds. Former Minister of Finance Gert Hanekom was implicated in a corruption scandal involving the misuse of government funds.

=== Nepotism and cronyism ===
Colonizers favored their own kin and allies, awarding contracts and positions without merit or transparency. During the apartheid era, nepotism and cronyism were used to maintain white minority rule, with positions of power reserved for those with connections to the ruling party. After independence in 1990, nepotism and cronyism continued, with the ruling SWAPO party accused of appointing party loyalists and family members to key positions, often without proper qualifications.

Former President Sam Nujoma appointed his son, Zack Nujoma, to various high-profile positions, including CEO of the state-owned Namibia Development Corporation. Former President Hifikepunye Pohamba appointed his son, Kaupu Pohamba, as head of the Namibia Revenue Agency. Former Minister of Mines and Energy, Isak Katali, awarded mining licenses to companies linked to his family members. Former Minister of Finance, Calle Schlettwein, appointed his brother, Andreas Schlettwein, as head of the Namibia Investment Center.

These appointments often led to allegations of favoritism, corruption, and mismanagement, undermining the country's economic development and perpetuating inequality. Nepotism and cronyism have also led to the marginalization of qualified individuals and the perpetuation of a patronage system, where loyalty to the ruling party is rewarded with positions of power and influence.

=== Suppression of resistance ===
Colonial powers brutally suppressed anti-colonial resistance, using force, intimidation, and coercion to maintain control. Namibia's corruption associated with suppression of resistance refers to the use of corrupt practices by those in power to silence and suppress opposition, dissent, and resistance. This has been a persistent feature of Namibia's history, particularly during the apartheid era and early years of independence.

During apartheid, the South African government and its agents in Namibia used corruption to suppress resistance from anti-apartheid activists and organizations. This included bribing officials to turn a blind eye to human rights abuses, embezzling funds meant for development projects to finance propaganda campaigns and using state resources to intimidate and silence opponents. After independence in 1990, corruption continued to be used to suppress resistance, with the ruling SWAPO party accused of using state resources to silence opposition voices. This included appointing loyalists to key positions, awarding government contracts to party-linked businesses, and using state media to propagate party propaganda.

Examples of individuals involved in corruption associated with suppression of resistance include former President Sam Nujoma, who was accused of using state resources to silence opposition voices and intimidate critics. Former Minister of Home Affairs, Jerry Ekandjo, was implicated in a corruption scandal involving the misuse of government funds to finance party political activities. Former Police Commissioner, General Sebastian Ndeitunga, was accused of using police resources to suppress opposition protests and intimidate activists.

Incidents of corruption associated with suppression of resistance include the infamous "Koevoet scandal" of the 1980s, in which South African military officers embezzled funds meant for development projects to finance their military campaigns against anti-apartheid activists. In the 1990s, the SWAPO party was accused of using government funds to finance its election campaigns and silence opposition voices. In recent years, there have been allegations of corruption and intimidation against opposition activists and journalists who have spoken out against government corruption and human rights abuses.

=== Economic inequality ===
Namibia's corruption associated with economic inequality refers to the use of corrupt practices by those in power to perpetuate and exacerbate economic disparities, enriching themselves and their allies at the expense of the broader population. This has been a persistent feature of Namibia's history, particularly during the apartheid era and early years of independence. During apartheid, the South African government and its agents in Namibia used corruption to entrench economic inequality, enriching white elites while impoverishing black Namibians. This included embezzling funds meant for development projects, awarding government contracts to white-owned businesses, and using state resources to exploit Namibia's natural resources for the benefit of apartheid-era elites.

After independence in 1990, corruption continued to perpetuate economic inequality, with the ruling SWAPO party accused of using state resources to enrich party loyalists and allies. This included awarding government contracts to party-linked businesses, appointing loyalists to key positions in state-owned enterprises, and using state resources to finance lavish lifestyles for the elite.

Examples of individuals involved in corruption associated with economic inequality include former President Hifikepunye Pohamba, who was accused of using state resources to enrich himself and his members. Former Minister of Mines and Energy, Isak Katali, was implicated in a corruption scandal involving the awarding of mining licenses to companies linked to himself and other ruling party officials. Former CEO of the Namibia Development Corporation, Kenneth Silver, was accused of embezzling millions of dollars in government funds meant for development projects.

Incidents of corruption associated with economic inequality include the "Fishrot scandal" of 2019, in which high-ranking government officials were accused of accepting bribes from Icelandic fishing companies in exchange for fishing quotas. The "Esaugate scandal" of 2020, in which former Minister of Fisheries, Bernhard Esau, was accused of corruptly awarding fishing quotas to companies linked to himself and other ruling party officials.

=== Cultural destruction ===
Colonizers erased indigenous cultures, languages, and traditions, imposing their own values and beliefs. Namibia's corruption associated with cultural destruction refers to the use of corrupt practices by those in power to erode and destroy the cultural heritage and identity of the Namibian people. This has been a persistent feature of Namibia's history, particularly during the apartheid era and early years of independence.

During apartheid, the South African government and its agents in Namibia used corruption to suppress and erase Namibian cultural identity, imposing white Afrikaner culture and values on the population. This included the forced removal of indigenous people from their land, the suppression of traditional languages and customs, and the destruction of cultural artifacts and historical sites. After independence in 1990, corruption continued to threaten Namibian cultural heritage, with the ruling SWAPO party accused of using state resources to promote a narrow, party-defined version of Namibian culture. This included the appropriation of traditional cultural symbols and practices for political gain, the suppression of dissenting cultural voices, and the neglect and destruction of cultural heritage sites.

Such individuals involved in corruption associated with cultural destruction include former President Sam Nujoma, who was accused of using state resources to promote his own cultural and political agenda. Former Minister of Culture, Kazenambo Kazenambo, was implicated in a corruption scandal involving the misuse of government funds meant for cultural preservation. Former Director of the Namibia National Museum, Pauline Mbundu, was accused of corruptly selling cultural artifacts to private collectors.

Incidents of corruption associated with cultural destruction include the controversial "Heroes' Acre" monument, built in 2002 to honor Namibia's independence struggle. Critics accused the government of using state resources to promote a partisan version of history and erase the cultural heritage of marginalized communities. The destruction of the historic "Omburu" cultural site in 2019, allegedly to make way for a luxury tourist development, sparked outrage among cultural activists and community leaders. The incidents have contributed to the erosion of Namibia's cultural heritage, threatening the very identity and soul of the nation.

== Post-independence era (1990-present) ==
Namibia gained independence in 1990, but corruption persisted. The ruling SWAPO party has been accused of cronyism, nepotism, and embezzlement. High-profile corruption cases involve government officials, politicians, and business leaders.

President Sam Nujoma's regime was marked by allegations of corruption, nepotism, and embezzlement. Nujoma himself was accused of corruptly acquiring wealth and properties. In the 1990s, the "Koevoet scandal" involved high-ranking government officials and police officers embezzling funds meant for development projects. Former Minister of Home Affairs, Jerry Ekandjo, was implicated in a corruption scandal involving the misuse of government funds. The "Esaugate scandal" in 2020 implicated former Minister of Fisheries, Bernhard Esau, and former CEO of the Namibia Fishing Corporation, Mike Nghipunya, in corruptly awarding fishing quotas to companies linked to themselves and other ruling party officials.

Former President Hifikepunye Pohamba was accused of corruptly enriching himself and his allies through corrupt land deals and mining licenses. His son, Kaupu Pohamba, was implicated in a corruption scandal involving the misuse of government funds.

The "Fishrot scandal" in 2019 involved high-ranking government officials, including former Minister of Justice, Sacky Shanghala, and former CEO of the Namibia Investment Center, James Hatuikulipi, accepting bribes from Icelandic fishing companies in exchange for fishing quotas.

== International ranking ==
In Transparency International's 2025 Corruption Perceptions Index, Namibia scored 46 on a scale from 0 ("highly corrupt") to 100 ("very clean"). When ranked by score, Namibia ranked 65th among the 182 countries in the Index, where the country ranked first is perceived to have the most honest public sector. For comparison with regional scores, the best score among sub-Saharan African countries (Note: Angola, Benin, Botswana, Burkina Faso, Burundi, Cameroon, Cape Verde, Central African Republic, Chad, Comoros, Côte d'Ivoire, Democratic Republic of the Congo, Djibouti, Equatorial Guinea, Eritrea, Eswatini, Ethiopia, Gabon, Gambia, Ghana, Guinea, Guinea-Bissau, Kenya, Lesotho, Liberia, Madagascar, Malawi, Mali, Mauritania, Mauritius, Mozambique, Namibia, Niger, Nigeria, Republic of the Congo, Rwanda, Sao Tome and Principe, Senegal, Seychelles, Sierra Leone, Somalia, South Africa, South Sudan, Sudan, Tanzania, Togo, Uganda, Zambia, and Zimbabwe.) was 68, the average was 32 and the worst was 9. For comparison with worldwide scores, the best score was 89 (ranked 1), the average was 42, and the worst was 9 (ranked 181, in a two-way tie).

== Media, civil society, and resistance ==
Media, civil society, and resistance have played a crucial role in exposing and combating corruption in Namibia. It has been instrumental in uncovering corruption scandals, with investigative journalism and media outlets like The Namibian, Namibia Today, and New Era consistently reporting on corruption cases, keeping the public informed and holding those in power accountable.

Civil society organizations such as the Namibia Civil Society Forum, the Namibia Non-Governmental Organizations Forum, and the Anti-Corruption Coalition of Namibia have actively campaigned against corruption, mobilizing public protests, petitions, and awareness campaigns, pushing for accountability and transparency.

Resistance from whistleblowers, activists, and ordinary citizens has been crucial, with individuals risking personal safety and livelihoods to expose corruption and wrongdoing. Online platforms and social media have amplified the voices of citizens, allowing them to share their experiences and demand accountability. Notable individuals and organizations include journalist and editor Gwen Lister, civil society leader Pauline Mbundu, whistleblower Johannes Stefansson, and the Namibia Transparency and Accountability Forum. The efforts have contributed to increased public awareness and engagement on corruption issues, pressure on government to establish anti-corruption institutions and laws, investigations and prosecutions of high-profile corruption cases, and international attention and support for Namibia's anti-corruption efforts.

== Money laundering laws ==
Namibia's money laundering laws aim to prevent and combat money laundering and terrorist financing. The country has implemented various laws and regulations, including the Financial Intelligence Act of 2012, the Prevention of Organized Crime Act of 2004, and the Anti-Money Laundering and Combating the Financing of Terrorism Regulations of 2019.

Control agencies in Namibia responsible for combating corruption and money laundering include the Financial Intelligence Centre, the Anti-Corruption Commission, the Namibia Revenue Agency, the Namibia Police Force, and the Directorate of Enforcement and Prevention of the Anti-Corruption Commission. The agencies work together to investigate suspicious transactions, freeze and seize assets linked to money laundering and corruption, prosecute offenders, and conduct public awareness campaigns.

== Political change ==
Political change in Namibia has led to the establishment of the Anti-Corruption Commission and the Financial Intelligence Centre, the enactment of the Anti-Money Laundering and Combating the Financing of Terrorism Regulations, the ratification of international conventions against corruption and money laundering, and the implementation of measures to increase transparency and accountability in government and public institutions.

While Namibia has made significant progress in combating corruption and money laundering, continued efforts are needed to address the evolving nature of these crimes.

== See also ==
- Crime in Namibia
- International Anti-Corruption Academy
- Group of States Against Corruption
- International Anti-Corruption Day
- United Nations Convention against Corruption
- OECD Anti-Bribery Convention
- Transparency International
