= Rosh Pinah Wind Power Station =

Wind farm in Namibia

- Country: Namibia
- Location: Sperrgebiet National Park, ǁKaras Region
- Coordinates: 26°40′23″S 15°05′20″E
- Status: Proposed
- Owner: NamPower
- Operator: NamPower

Wind farm
- Type: Onshore

Power generation
- Units operational: 16
- Nameplate capacity: 40 MW
- Annual net output: ~150 GWh

The Rosh Pinah Wind Power Station, was a planned 40 MW wind-power plant in Namibia. The wind farm was under development by Namibia Power Corporation Limited (NamPower), the Namibian electricity parastatal company. This wind farm is intended to increase Namibia's energy generation mix. An environmental impact assessment study by the consulting firm Enviro Dynamics, has been ongoing since 2020 and will inform the management of this renewable energy project.

== Location ==
The power station would be located in Sperrgebiet National Park, in the ǁKaras Region, near the Atlantic Ocean coast of Namibia. Sperrgebiet National Park is located approximately 702 kilometres (436 mi), southwest of Windhoek, the capital and largest city of Namibia.

== Overview ==
The design called for the installation of 16 wind turbines, each rated at 2.5 MW, for a total generating capacity of 40 MW. NamPower, the owner and developer of the wind farm will inject the energy from this power station, into the Namibian electricity grid.

== Ownership ==
The power station was owned 100 percent by NamPower, the national electricity utility parastatal company that was also developing the wind farm.

== Construction ==
In 2021, NamPower advertised for qualified engineering, procurement and construction (EPC) contractors to submit bids to construct this power station.

The wind farm was abandoned when feasibility studies indicated the site lacked sufficient wind current to support a commercially viable wind farm. NamPower then directed its efforts into developing the NamPower Solar Power Station, initially as a 70 MW and later as a 100 MW solar farm.

== Other considerations ==
According to Power Africa, as of December 2021, Namibia had installed capacity of 680 MW. Of that, 517 MW were generated from renewable sources. However, an estimated 60 percent of the country's electricity consumption, was imported from "South Africa's Eskom and Zimbabwe's ZESA. This station was an attempt to close that energy deficit. Namibian authorities have ambition to source at least 70 percent of the national electricity consumption from renewable sources, by 2030.

== See also ==
- List of power stations in Namibia
- NamPower Solar Power Station
