= Cerim Luderitz Wind Power Station =

Wind farm in Namibia

- Country: Namibia
- Location: Lüderitz, Karas Region
- Coordinates: 26°42′04″S 15°07′42″E
- Status: Proposed
- Commission date: July 2025 (expected)
- Construction cost: US$76.6 Million
- Owner: Cerim Lüderitz Energy
- Operator: Cerim Lüderitz Energy

Power generation
- Nameplate capacity: 50 MW

The Cerim Luderitz Wind Power Station, is a 50 MW (67,000 hp) power plant that is being developed in Namibia. The power station is under development and is owned by Cerim Luderitz Energy, a joint venture company owned by (a) China Energy Engineering Corporation (CEEC) and (b) Riminii Investments, a Namibian company. The energy generated at this wind farm will be sold to NamPower, the national electricity parastatal company of Namibia, under a 25-year power purchase agreement (PPA).

== Location ==
The power station is on the Atlantic coast, approximately 16 kilometres (9.9 mi) south of the town of Lüderitz, in the ǁKaras Region of Namibia. The wind farm lies approximately 9 kilometres (6 mi), inland from the coast.

Lüderitz is located approximately 341 kilometres (212 mi) west of Keetmanshoop, the regional headquarters and nearest large city. This is about 700 kilometres (435 mi) southwest of Windhoek, the capital and largest city in the country. Lüderitz is a harbor town along the coast of the Atlantic Ocean, in southwest Namibia.

== Overview ==
This renewable energy project is under development by a special purpose company called Cerim Lüderitz Energy, co-owned by China Energy Engineering Corporation (CEEC) and the Namibian company Riminii Investments.

The project involves the construction of the wind farm and related transmission infrastructure. NamPower, the Namibian public electricity utility company signed a 25-year power purchase agreement to purchase the entire power output of this wind farm.

== Developers ==
The table below illustrates the shareholding in the ad hoc company Cerim Lüderitz Energy formed to own, build, finance, operate and maintain this power station.

Shareholding In Cerim Lüderitz Energy
Rank	Shareholder	Domicile	Percentage	Notes
1	China Energy Engineering Corporation (CEEC)	China		
2	Riminii Investments	Namibia		
	Total		100.0	

== Other considerations ==
The owner/developer has undertaken to complete construction within 27 months and connect this renewable energy infrastructure project to the Namibian electricity grid by July 2025. Construction costs are budgeted at US$76.6 million (approximately N$1.47 billion).

== See also ==
- List of power stations in Namibia
- Diaz Wind Power Station
