= Diaz Wind Power Station =

Wind power station in Namibia

- Country: Namibia
- Location: Lüderitz, Karas Region
- Coordinates: 26°38′53″S 15°11′05″E
- Status: Operational
- Commission date: 2022 (expected)
- Construction cost: 150 Million
- Owner: Diaz Wind Power
- Operator: Diaz Wind Power

Power generation
- Nameplate capacity: 44 MW (expandable to 90 MW)

The Diaz Wind Power Station, is a 44 MW (59,000 hp) power plant under construction in Namibia. The power station is under development and is owned by Diaz Wind Power, a joint venture company owned by (a) United Africa Group and (b) Quantum Power. The energy generated at this wind farm will be sold to NamPower, the national electricity parastatal company of Namibia, under a 25-year power purchase agreement (PPA).

== Location ==
The power station is located near the town of Lüderitz, in the Karas Region of Namibia. Lüderitz is located approximately 341 kilometres (212 mi) west of Keetmanshoop, the regional headquarters and nearest large city. This is about 700 kilometres (435 mi) southwest of Windhoek, the capital and largest city in the country. Lüderitz is a harbor town in southwest Namibia, along the coast of the Atlantic Ocean.

== Overview ==
This renewable energy project is under development under a public private partnership (PPP) arrangement. The IPP named Diaz Wind Power Pty, has rented land from the government of Namibia, where it is developing this power station.

The project involves the construction of the wind farm and related transmission infrastructure. A 132kV substation will be constructed at the power station. A new 132kV transmission line will evacuate the power generated to a NamPower substation in the town of Namib, 27 kilometres (17 mi), from the Diaz Wind farm. The NamPower substations at Namib and Kokerboom, will be upgraded to facilitate integration of the energy into the Namibian grid.

== Developers ==
The table below illustrates the shareholding in the ad hoc company Diaz Wind Power Pty formed to own, build, finance, operate and maintain this power station.

Shareholding In Diaz Wind Power Pty
Rank	Shareholder	Domicile	Percentage	Notes
1	United Africa Group	Namibia		
2	Innovent SAS	France		
	Total		100.0	

In 2024, majority shareholding in Diaz Wind Power Pty was acquired by InnoVent SAS, based in France.

== Other considerations ==
Detailed grid evaluation performed before construction started, indicates that the connecting grid infrastructure can evacuate up to 90 MW. It is expected that Diaz Wind Power Station will be expanded to 90 megawatts capacity in the future.

== See also ==
- List of power stations in Namibia
- Cerim Luderitz Wind Power Station
