= Erongo Battery Energy Storage System =

Battery Energy Storage System in Namibia

- Country: Namibia
- Location: Omaruru, Erongo Region
- Coordinates: 21°29′49″S 16°01′40″E
- Status: Proposed
- Construction cost: €26 million
- Owner: NamPower
- Operator: NamPower

Power generation
- Nameplate capacity: 58 MW (78,000 hp)

The Erongo Battery Energy Storage System, also Erongo BESS, is a planned 58 MW (78,000 hp) battery energy storage system installation in Namibia. The BESS, the first of its kind in the country and in the Southern African region, will be capable of providing 72MWh of clean energy to the Namibian grid.

== Location ==
The BESS unit would be located at the site of NamPower's Omburu Substation, approximately 12 kilometres (7 mi), southeast of the city of Omaruru in the Erongo Region, in central Namibia. The geographical coordinates of this location are:21°29'49.0"S, 16°01'40.0"E (Latitude:-21.496944; Longitude:16.027778).

== Overview ==
The BESS station has storage capacity of 58 megawatts. Its design allows for a discharge capacity of 72MWh of energy into the Namibian grid. The BESS is expected to store "locally generated renewable power as well as electricity imported from the Southern African Power Pool (SAPP)". The electricity will be stored at off-peak times, when it is cheaper. The stored energy can then be discharged "during peak times".

The intended benefits include (a) stabilization of NamPower's grid (b) act as a back-up, if and when existing generation facilities fail (c) reduce the cost of electricity fed through the SAPP.

== Developers ==
The BESS station is under development by the Namibia Power Corporation (Pty) Limited, who own the station. The development receives support (financial and technical) from the German State-Owned Investment and Development Bank (KfW). In December 2021, KfW made a grant of €20 million towards the development of this project, estimated at 80 percent of total cost. NamPower is expected to contribute about 20 percent of the cost and pay any outstanding taxes not covered by the KfW grant.

In December 2023, NamPower selected a consortium of two Chinese companies to jointly develop the power station. The engineering, procurement and construction (EPC) contract was awarded to a joint venture between Shandong Electrical, Engineering & Equipment Group and Zhejiang Narada Power Source. Construction is expected to start in Q1 2024 and commercial commissioning is planned for H2 2025. Zhejiang Narada struggled financially in 2026.

== See also ==
- List of power stations in Namibia
- Battery storage power station
- Balama Solar Power Station
