= NNF =

NNF may mean:Net financial flows: financial assets- financial liabilities

- Name Not Final, an abbreviation in creative works placed after a Working title
- Namibia National Front
- Namibia Nature Foundation
- Food Union NNF, a Danish trade union
- Negation Normal Form (in mathematics, computer science, logic)
- Never Not Funny, Jimmy Pardo's award-winning weekly podcast
- NoNonsense Forum, an open-source easy-to-deploy forum solution
- Norwegian Narcotic Officers Association, lobbying organization
