= TeraSun Energy Solar Power Station =

Solar power station in Namibia

- Country: Namibia
- Location: Arandis, Erongo Region
- Coordinates: 22°24′44″S 14°59′57″E
- Status: Proposed
- Construction began: 2022
- Commission date: 2024 Expected
- Construction cost: US$69.8 million
- Owner: TeraSun Energy
- Operator: TeraSun Energy

Solar farm
- Type: Flat-panel PV
- Site area: 120 hectares (300 acres)

Power generation
- Units planned: 148,000
- Nameplate capacity: 81 MW (109,000 hp)
- Annual net output: 227.7 GWh

The TeraSun Energy Solar Power Station is a planned 81 megawatts solar power plant in Namibia. The power station is owned and is being developed by a consortium comprising Natura Energy, a Namibia-based energy company and Globleq Africa Limited, an independent power producer (IPP), headquartered in the United Kingdom.

The developers of this solar farm intend to sell the electricity directly to commercial customers in Namibia, through the transmission network of NamPower, the national electricity utility company, as permissible by the recent changes in the laws of the country.

== Location ==
The power station would occupy a piece of real estate measuring 120 hectares (300 acres), in the town of Arandis, in Erongo Region, in western central Namibia. Arandis is located approximately 51 kilometres (32 mi) northeast of Swakopmund, the capital of the Erongo Region. This is about 307 kilometres (191 mi) west of Windhoek, the capital city of that country.

== History ==
Namibia's Natura Energy, through its subsidiary TeraSun Energy, has been developing this power station on its own since circa 2018. At that time a 50 MW installation was being considered at an estimated cost of US$63.2 million.

In 2021, Natura Energy convinced Globeleq Africa to become a shareholder in the project. Globeleq Africa is an IPP based in the United Kingdom with knowledge and experience in energy generation, transmission, distribution, marketing and financing in Africa. The capacity of the power station was increased from the original 50 MW to 81 MW. The cost of construction also went up from US$63.2 million to US$69.8 million.

== Developers ==
TeraSun Energy is the special purpose vehicle (SPV) created by the power station developers to design, own, build, operate and maintain this power station. The ownership of the SPV company is as illustrated in the table below.

Shareholding In TeraSun Energy
Rank	Shareholder	Domicile	Percentage	Notes
1	Natura Energy	Namibia		
2	Globeleq	United Kingdom		
	Total		100.0	

== Timeline ==
Construction is expected to start in 2022, with commercial commissioning anticipated in 2023.

== See also ==
- List of power stations in Namibia
