= NamPower Solar Power Station =

Solar farm in Namibia

NamPower Solar Power Station NamPower Solar Power Station (Namibia)
- Country: Namibia
- Location: Rosh Pinah, ǁKaras Region
- Coordinates: 26°40′23″S 15°05′16″E
- Status: Proposed
- Construction began: H2 2024 Expected
- Commission date: Q2 2026 Expected
- Construction cost: US$78.33 million
- Owner: Namibia Power Corporation Limited
- Operator: NamPower

Solar farm
- Type: Flat-panel PV

Power generation
- Nameplate capacity: 100 MW

Distinguish from the 5 Megawatts Rosh Pinah Solar Power Plant majority owned by Old Mutual Namibia.

NamPower Solar Power Station (NSPS), also referred to as NamPower Rosh Pinah Solar Power Station, is a planned 100 megawatts solar power station in Namibia. The power station is under development by Namibia Power Corporation Limited (NamPower), the Namibian state-owned electric utility company. When completed, this renewable energy infrastructure project is expected to become the largest grid-ready, solar power plant in the country.

== Location ==
The solar farm is located on an area measuring 250 acres (100 ha), outside the town of Rosh Pinah, ǁKaras Region in southern Namibia, close to the border with South Africa. The town of Rosh Pinah is located approximately 724 kilometres (450 mi), southwest of Windhoek, the capital and largest city of Namibia.

== Overview ==
The power station has a planned capacity of 100 megawatts. NamPower intends to integrate the electricity generated here, into the national electricity grid.

== Background ==
In 2020, this renewable energy infrastructure project was conceived as the 40 MW Rosh Pinah Wind Power Station. In 2023, the project transformed into the 70 MW Rosh Pinah Solar Power Station, following feasibility studies which revealed that the location did not host sufficient wind current to support a commercially viable wind farm. The generation capacity of the solar farm was increased from 70 MW to 100 MW when NamPower decided to invest 20 percent in the public–private partnership (PPP) project.

== Construction ==
The engineering, procurement and construction (EPC) company is a joint venture (JV) comprising China Jiangxi International Economic and Technical Cooperation Company Limited and China New Energy Development (Zhejiang) Company Limited. The contract price is NAD1.4 billion (approx. US$78.33 million). Of this, 80 percent will be provided as a loan to NamPower by the German Development Bank (KfW), while the remaining 20 percent will be raised by NamPower from internal sources. Construction is expected to begin during H2 2024, with commercial commissioning expected in Q2 of 2026. The table below illustrates the sources of funding for the construction of NamPower Solar Power Station.

Sources of Funding For Construction of NamPower Solar Power Station
Rank	Fund Source	Domicile	Contribution in US$	Percentage	Notes
1	KfW	Germany	62.67 million	80.0	Loan
2	NamPower	Namibia	15.67 million	20.0	Equity
	Total		78.33 million	100.00	

== Other considerations ==
As of 2024, Namibia's generation Capacity was about 500 MW. In order to meet its power needs, the country has contracts to buy extra power from South Africa (100 MW), Zambia (180 MW) and Zimbabwe (80 MW). This power station is intended to diversify the country's electricity generation mix and to reduce its dependence on imported electricity.

== See also ==
- List of power stations in Namibia
