= Karibib Solar Power Plant =

Photovoltaic power plant in Karibib, Erongo, Namibia

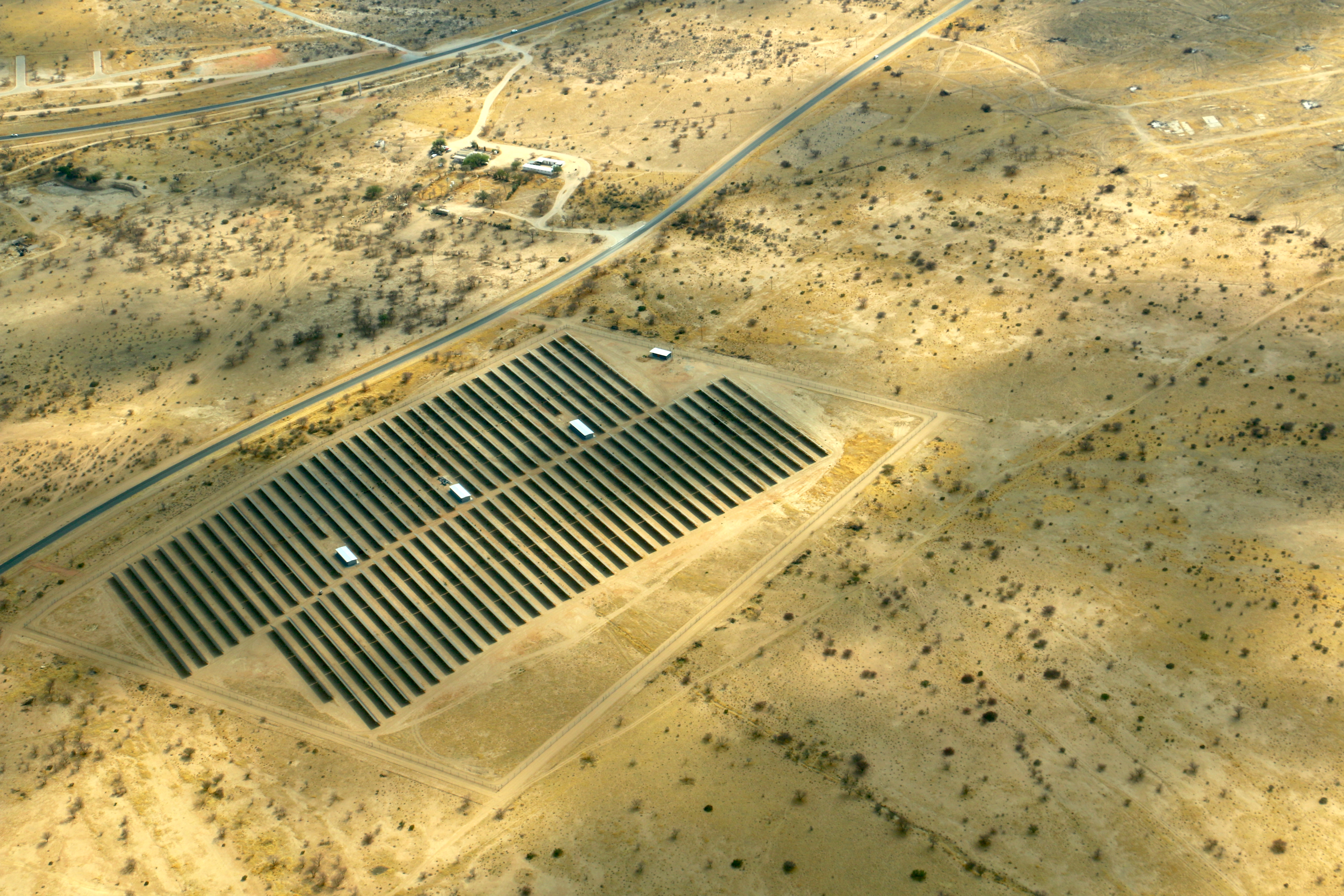
- Country: Namibia
- Location: Karibib, Erongo
- Coordinates: 21°56′54.0″S 15°50′20.5″E
- Commission date: June 2017

Power generation
- Nameplate capacity: 5 MW

The Karibib Solar Power Plant is a photovoltaic power station in Karibib, Erongo Region, Namibia.

== History ==
The power station was commissioned in June 2017 in a ceremony attended by the CEO of Electricity Control Board.

== Architecture ==
The power station spans over an area of 11 hectares.

== Technical specifications ==
The power station has an installed capacity of 5 MW. It consists of 51,372 photovoltaic panels.

== See also ==
- List of power stations in Namibia
