= Crime in Namibia =

Namibia is located in sub-Saharan Africa, a region that has some of the highest crime rates in the world. Contributing factors are for instance poverty, a low level of development, and huge social and economic disadvantages. For example, according to government statistics, the unemployment rate reached 28.1% in 2014; in 2008, it was 51.2%.

Crimes reported in Namibia amounted to 96,200 in the financial year March 2008–February 2009, in 2009/10 to 98,671, and in 2010/11 to 90,675. More than two fifths of all stated crimes occur in the capital Windhoek, where the majority of reported crimes are burglaries, robberies, and assaults. According to a US State Department report in 2015, the most common type of crime in Windhoek, Namibia's capital, is petty street crime, with most incidents occurring after dark, and criminals using knives and occasionally firearms.

Organised crime across all of Southern Africa probably only developed in the 1980s. While the thousands of kilometers of unsecured borders are often believed to be responsible for enabling cross-border crime, "research has shown that criminals prefer legal border points". Organised crime in Namibia is active mainly in the transporting of drugs and the hiring of drug mules, as well in laundering of money through investments in real estate and luxury assets.

== Types of crime ==
=== Crimes against the person ===
==== Serial killings ====
Namibia has experienced at least one serial killings event when between 2005 and 2007 the B1 Butcher killed and dismembered five women and deposited body parts along Namibia's National Road B1. The identity of the B1 Butcher was never conclusively determined.

==== Violence ====
Namibia has a high rate of domestic violence, particularly against women and children. Rape and murder cases are frequent. The number of rape cases reported annually was estimated to be between 700 and 1,600 in 2010, and domestic violence is primarily done by men against women. A report on the period from 2012 to 2015 counted roughly 40,000 assault cases, 2 839 rape cases, 1 138 attempted murders and 734 murders while pointing out that a large number of cases remain unreported. A census in 2011 showed that the Namibian population was 2 113 077, and the UN Drugs and Organised Crime Office counted the number of murders in 2012 at 388 or 17.2 people per 100,000. This is relatively high compared to other African countries; for comparison, Guinea-Bissau had 140 murders or 8.4 per 100,000 people according to UN survey data.

There are a number of non-profit organisations to counter gender-based violence but the problem is perceived to become worse. Former President Hifikepunye Pohamba suggested in 2014 that 6 March should become a national prayer day, a measure that has received criticism for undermining the secular organisation of the state.

==== Infanticide ====
There are a number of cases every year where newborn babies are dumped in river beds, in rubbish-bins and in dams. According to the report published by the parliamentary standing committee on human resources, social and community development, from 2003 to 2007, baby dumping rose from 6 to 23 cases per year, a 283 percent rise. Most of these cases of concealment of birth go unreported; Windhoek Water Works alone reported in 2008 that they discover 13 dead newborns in their waste water system per month. According to Sister Namibia, a feminist magazine published in the country since its independence, Namibian abortion laws are restrictive, and illegal backstreet abortions are also a growing concern in the country.

==== Human trafficking ====
Namibia is a country of origin, transit, and destination for foreign and Namibian women and children, and possibly for men subjected to trafficking in persons, specifically conditions of forced labor and forced prostitution. Traffickers exploit Namibian children, as well as children from Angola and Zambia, through forced labor in agriculture, cattle herding, involuntary domestic servitude, charcoal production, and commercial sexual exploitation. In some cases, Namibian parents unwittingly sell their children to traffickers. Reports indicate that vulnerable Namibian children are recruited for forced prostitution in Angola and South Africa, typically by truck drivers. There is also some evidence that traffickers move Namibian women to South Africa and South African women to Namibia to be exploited in forced prostitution. Namibian women and children, including orphans, from rural areas are the most vulnerable to trafficking.

=== Property crimes ===
==== Money laundering ====
Money laundering is legislated by the Financial Intelligence Act and controlled by the Financial Intelligence Centre. The Centre reported a significant increase in suspicious transactions in 2011, but already in 2003 the United Nations described the situation as "critical".

==== Stock theft ====
Stock theft is a prevalent crime in Namibia and carries hefty penalties. After a 2004 law amendment to the Stock Theft Act, stealing livestock over the value of 500N$ results in a 20-year (repeat offenders: 30 year) mandatory prison sentence. This clause has in 2011 been declared unconstitutional, but several people were sentenced until then.

== Prisons ==
Namibia has seven major prisons: Windhoek central prison, Omaruru correctional facility, Swakopmund correctional facility, Evaristus Shikongo correctional facility in Tsumeb, Oluno correctional facility in Ondangwa, Divundu correctional facility, and the Hardap correctional facility in Mariental. The combined inmate capacity As of 2022 is 5,424, with 4,087 people currently serving jail time.

== Notable individual crimes ==
- 1988 Oshakati bomb blast
- Murder of Magdalena Stoffels (2010)
