= Omburu Solar Power Station =

Solar power station in Namibia

- Country: Namibia
- Location: Omaruru, Erongo Region
- Coordinates: 21°29′12″S 16°01′46″E
- Status: Operational
- Construction began: March 2021
- Commission date: June 2022
- Construction cost: US$20 million
- Owner: NamPower
- Operator: NamPower

Solar farm
- Type: Flat-panel PV
- Site area: 40 hectares (99 acres)

Power generation
- Nameplate capacity: 20 MW (27,000 hp)
- Annual net output: 67.8 Gwh

The Omburu Solar Power Station, is a 20 megawatts solar power station in Namibia. The power station, which was developed and is owned by Namibia Power Corporation (Proprietary) Limited (NamPower), was constructed between March 2021 and June 2022 and was commercially commissioned on 24 June 2022. NamPower integrates the energy generated here, calculated at 67.8 GWh annually, into the Namibian grid. This is the first grid-connected PV solar power station, fully owned and operated by NamPower.

== Location ==
The solar farm sits on 40 hectares (99 acres), approximately 15 kilometres (9 mi) southeast of the town of Omaruru, in the Erongo Region of Namibia. This is about 196 kilometres (122 mi) northwest of Windhoek, the capital and largest city of Namibia. The geographical coordinates of this solar farm are: 21°29'12.0"S, 16°01'46.0"E (Latitude:-21.486667; Longitude:16.029444).

== Ownership ==
The power station is 100 percent owned by NamPower, the Namibian electricity utility parastatal company.

== Construction and cost ==
The construction cost is reported as NAD:317 million (approx. US$20 million). The engineering, procurement and construction (EPC) contract was awarded to a joint venture between Hopsol Africa and Tulive Private Equity, both Namibian companies based in Windhoek.

== Timeline ==
The solar farm took 15 months to construct. Commercial commissioning was achieved on 24 June 2022.

== Other considerations ==
At the time this power station was commissioned, it was the source of the cheapest electric energy in Namibia at that time. The solar farm is part of NamPower's target to increase national generation capacity from "624 MW to 879 MW by 2025".

== See also ==
- Erongo Battery Energy Storage System
