= B1 Butcher =

Unidentified serial killer in Namibia

Details
- Victims: 5
- Span of crimes: 2005–2007
- State: Namibia

The B1 Butcher is an unidentified serial killer in Namibia. The B1 Butcher murdered at least five women between 2005 and 2007, with all murders related to the National Road B1.

In 2007, a German-born Namibian was accused of rape, arrested and later linked to these unsolved murders. However, he was, after a long period of imprisonment, acquitted due to a lack of evidence. In 2008, a man who committed suicide was implicated as the series of murders ended in 2007, but the connection could not be conclusively proven.

== Name ==
The B1 Butcher got its name from the Namibian media, due to victims' remains being found in close proximity to the Namibian National Road B1, which crosses the country from north to south. The "butcher" part of the name stems from the professional way in which the bodies were dismembered. The B1 Butcher was also referred to as the "Khomas Ripper", due to the region where the remains of the victims were found.

== Murders ==
Body parts were found in June and July 2007 in the Khomas Region along the B1 in the greater Windhoek area between Rehoboth and Okahandja. These body parts were wrapped in garbage bags and belonged to two different women. As far back as 2005, two similar unexplained murders of women occurred, those two murders have subsequently also been attributed to the B1 Butcher.

The head and an arm of the most recent victim were found in August 2007, further north on the B1 between Windhoek, Okahandja. Further body parts of the same victim were discovered in September 2007 near Grootfontein in the Otjozondjupa Region. This woman has never been identified. Police took this sequence of events as a clue that the murderer might have moved from Windhoek further north.

In October 2007, investigations were helped by three senior serial murder detectives from the Republic of South Africa. It is believed this series of murders will never be solved.

== Victims ==
All five of the B1 Butcher victims were young or middle-aged women. Two of the five women killed (both found in 2007) could not be identified. The other three women are Juanita Mabula (21 years, murdered in 2005), Melanie Janse (22 years, 2005) and Sanna Helena ǁGaroës (36 years, 2007).

All murdered women were Namibians of colour, each of the three identified victims was fluent in Afrikaans, Damara, or both. In addition, all victims' body parts showed signs of freezing or refrigeration, suggesting that they were in some sort of cold storage. The method of killing, however, was different: Janse was strangled, and Mabula was hit on the head with a blunt object.

At least two of the three identified victims were prostitutes, working in Windhoek's downtown Ausspannplatz area. Two of the victims, Janse and ǁGaroes, apparently knew each other well.

== Suspects ==
In August 2007, the German citizen Heinz Knierim was arrested because he was suspected of having raped a 29-year-old Namibian near Windhoek the previous month. He was also said to have tried to subsequently strangle the woman. Knierim denied all allegations. In February 2010, he was acquitted for lack of evidence and released from custody. Knierim sued for damages against the Namibian government due to the ordeal of having been accused of being the B1 Butcher.

In 2008, Hans Husselmann from Rehoboth took his life after being implicated in the murders. He had served a life sentence for two murders before and was only released in 2004. Although ǁGaroës' DNA was found in Husselmann's flat and Husselmann's DNA was found on a letter to the Police concerning the Mabula murder, evidence was inconclusive. At that time, suspicions arose that the B1 Butcher might not be one single person but rather one "lead actor" and several copycats.

== Aftermath and consequences ==
In July 2007, women from Windhoek, Rehoboth and Tsumis Park published a joint open letter to the B1 Butcher to provide information on the still missing body parts for decent burial of the murder victims. They also told him to hand himself over to the police.

In 2010, a human head and an arm were discovered on a farm in Rehoboth, raising fears that the Butcher might be active again. A connection to the murders of the B1 Butcher in this case was, however, not considered likely because it did not show many of the previous similarities: The body parts were not found near a highway, and were burnt instead of frozen.

The murder series caused considerable public criticism of the effectiveness and efficiency of the Namibian Police, as in other violent crime cases like the Murder of Magdalena Stoffels.

== See also ==
- List of fugitives from justice who disappeared
- List of unsolved murders (2000–present)
