= Otjikoto Solar Power Station =

Solar power station in Namibia

- Country: Namibia
- Location: Maxwell Farm, Otjozondjupa Region
- Coordinates: 19°55′25.4″S 16°57′10.4″E
- Status: Under construction
- Construction began: 2024 Expected
- Commission date: 2025 Expected
- Construction cost: US$10.6 million
- Owner: Sustainable Power Solutions
- Operator: Sustainable Power Solutions

Solar farm
- Type: Flat-panel PV

Power generation
- Nameplate capacity: 10 MW (13,000 hp)
- Annual net output: 26,360 MWh

The Otjikoto Solar Power Station is a planned 10 megawatts solar power plant in Namibia. The power station is owned and is being developed by Sustainable Power Solutions, a Namibian independent power producer, in collaboration with two other Namibian entities.

== Location ==
The power station is under construction in North Central Namibia, on the Maxwell Farm, owned by the Oelofse family. The power generated here is intended for sale to the Otjikoto Gold Mine, owned by B2Gold, a Canadian gold mining company that is the largest gold miner in Namibia. The Otjikoto Gold Mine is located approximately 323 kilometres (201 mi), by road, north of Windhoek, the capital city of Namibia.

== Overview ==
Under current Namibia's laws, it is possible for an independent power producer (IPP) to produce power and sell that power to a specific customer using NamPower transmission network to relay the power. This transaction is referred as a "power-wheeling project". The development of this power station and the related power purchase arrangements are the first such transaction in the country.

The power station is located approximately 300 kilometres (186 mi) away from the target gold mine. The power will be fed into the NamPower grid and transported to the target customer's location. Close to the target customer, the power is downloaded through the new "Eldorado substation" and then transmitted to the gold mine.

== Developers ==
Sustainable Power Solutions (SPS), is the Namibian IPP that owns and is developing the power station. SPS is collaborating with the Oelofse Family, who own the farm, where the solar park is located, and with Fortitude Property Group, a Namibian real estate investment and management company.

== Timeline ==
Construction is expected to start in H1 2024, with commercial commissioning anticipated in H2 2024.

== Other considerations ==
The construction cost is reported as NAD 200 million (US$10.6 million). The power generated here is calculated at 26,360 MWh annually. The owners of this solar farm are planning to expand the capacity of the power station in the future. The increased generation capacity is intended to be sold to additional qualified Namibian customers including "regional electricity distributors, large industrial and mining companies, as well as municipalities".

== See also ==
- List of power stations in Namibia
