= Namibia Nature Foundation =

Non-governmental organization

- Formation: 1987
- Headquarters: 76 - 78 Frans Indongo Street
- Location: Windhoek, Namibia
- Website: www.nnf.org.na

Namibia Nature Foundation (NNF), established in 1987, is a people-centred conservation and sustainable development non-governmental organisation (NGO), and one of the largest home-grown organisations of its kind. The organisation has a track record of work with communities, civil society organisations, and government in projects that aim to conserve and restore ecosystems, and to ensure the wise and ethical use of natural resources for the benefit of all Namibians.

The NNF implements projects under a broad range of programmatic areas that encompass the full spectrum of Namibia’s biodiversity from terrestrial to freshwater and marine ecosystems, including sustainable forestry, Community-Based Organization strengthening, sustainable agriculture, combating wildlife crime, and applied scientific research.

According to the organisation's Strategic Plan 2024–2029, Namibia Nature Foundation strives to uphold values that guide its work and partnerships. These include creating lasting biodiversity and livelihood outcomes by prioritising impact with people; empowering and capacitating communities while building networks for long-term impact; remaining agile, context-relevant, and evidence-driven through continuous innovation and learning; and acting as a reliable, competent, and trusted partner in all its engagements. The Namibia Nature Foundation has been a member of the International Union for Conservation of Nature (IUCN) since 1991.

== History ==
The foundation was established largely through the efforts of conservationist Louw Schoeman, and was formally launched on 29 July 1987 under the patronage of the Ohlthaver & List Group, with Douglas Reissner appointed as its first director. Namibia Nature Foundation was registered under a deed of trust with the Master of the Namibian High Court in 1987. Its initial purpose was to help the Namibian government Department of Nature Conservation to raise and administer funds for the conservation of wildlife as well as protected area management.

== Governance ==
The Namibia Nature Foundation operates as a non-profit organisation under a Deed of Trust registered with the Master of the Namibian High Court. Its Board of Trustees draws on 17 prominent members of the public and meets quarterly to receive the Executive Director's technical and financial reports, approve the annual budget, and consider the independent auditor's report. A separate bank account is maintained for each project; larger projects are audited independently every year, while smaller projects are covered by the foundation's annual audit. Project administration is supported by an interactive projects database that records the information required to manage and report on each initiative.

== Programmes ==
The foundation's work is organised around a number of core programmatic areas that span Namibia's terrestrial, freshwater and marine environments, in line with the country's Vision 2030. These include:

- Community-based natural resource management and the strengthening of community-based organisations (CBOs);
- Sustainable agriculture and agroecology aimed at improving soil health, crop yields and rural livelihoods;
- Combating wildlife crime and strengthening cross-border law enforcement;
- Conservation of marine and coastal ecosystems and the promotion of sustainable livelihoods for coastal communities;
- Protection of freshwater fish stocks and support for community co-managed fisheries;
- Sustainable forestry and habitat protection; and
- Applied scientific research on biodiversity, climate and land preservation.

== Funding and Activities ==
The Namibia Nature Foundation undertakes the implementation of donor-funded and philanthropic projects within the realm of environmental conservation. Part of this work is the coordination of grant programs and the provision of grant funds to third parties. Specific areas of activity include trans-boundary conservation, community-based natural resource management, environmental education and social ecology.

Notable ongoing and past initiatives include the following:

- Development of the National Adaptation Plan for Namibia, with funding of the Green Climate Fund.
- Citizen science training, aimed to build local capacity for biodiversity monitoring by equipping participants with practical tools for environmental data collection.
- Bees and Trees initiative under the KAZA Arise project, aiming to enhance food security and protect habitats within the Kavango Zambezi Transfrontier Conservation Area.
- Marine and coastal conservation, including work with the Albatross Task Force and the fishing industry to reduce seabird bycatch in Namibian waters, and support for the Namibian Islands' Marine Protected Area (NIMPA). The Namibian Albatross Task Force team, hosted by the foundation since 2008, contributed to an estimated 98% reduction in seabird bycatch in Namibia's demersal longline hake fishery after bird-scaring lines became mandatory in 2015, with estimated annual mortality falling from about 22,000 birds in 2009 to about 215 in 2018.
- The Freshwater Initiatives for Sustainable Habitats (FISH) project, which supports community co-managed fisheries and the long-term protection of Namibia's freshwater ecosystems.

== Partners ==
Namibia Nature Foundation is a member of the Namibian Chamber of Environment.

Partner organisations of the foundation include the Information System for Rare & High Value Species, the Namibia Association of CBNRM Support Organisations, Namibia Community Based Tourism Association (NACOBTA), the Desert Research Foundation of Namibia, NamPower, Rössing Foundation, the Namibian Ministry of Environment, Forestry and Tourism, and Bonny Vainö Idhenga Foundation (BVIF) among others.
