= Murder of Magdalena Stoffels =

2010 murder in Windhoek, Namibia

Magdalena Stoffels

The murder of Magdalena Stoffels occurred in Windhoek, Namibia on July 27, 2010. The rape and murder of the 17-year-old schoolgirl caused demonstrations and a debate on Namibia's stance on the death penalty. The perpetrator was never found.

== The case ==
Stoffels, a 17-year-old schoolgirl, was found in a riverbed near Dawid Bezuidenhout High School after having been raped and murdered. Later that same day, a police officer found a man named Junias Fillipus (32), washing clothes in the same riverbed. The distance was approximately 300 to 500 metres from where Stoffels' body was found. After observing what he believed to be scratch marks on his knees and back and blood stains on the clothes, the police officer arrested Fillipus in connection with the attack.

== Aftermath ==
The crime was described by The Namibian as among "most prominent cases of violence against women and children recorded in [Namibia] in 2010". The Windhoek Observer noted that "Fillipus' arrest sparked a public outcry against gender-based violence". Approximately 3,000 people, including schoolchildren from 10 schools, marched from Stoffels' school to the Magistrates' Court in Katutura to protest her rape and murder and to deliver a petition to the Deputy Prosecutor General, Johnny Truter, which pointed out the high rate of violent crime on Namibian children. The Southern Times reported that the murder of Stoffels "ignited debate on the reinstatement of the death penalty" in Namibia.

The evaluation of forensic evidence lasted almost a year. The results did not link Fillipus with the crime, and the charges against him were withdrawn. In May 2011, he was released from custody. Fillipus sued the Namibian Police for unlawful arrest, unlawful detention, and malicious prosecution in 2013. In 2016, the first two charges were thrown out of the Windhoek High Court due to a one-year statute of limitations for such claims. The third claim is yet to be heard in court. Meanwhile, investigators fear that the case has gone cold.

In 2013, a pedestrian bridge in Windhoek's Khomasdal suburb was named after Magdalena Stoffels. It is situated close to the Dawid Bezuidenhout school where Stoffels was a student, and it crosses the Arebbusch Riverbed in which the murder occurred. There is hope that the bridge would prevent future crimes in the bushy riverbed.

== See also ==
- List of unsolved murders (2000–present)
