= French Facility for Global Environment =

The French Facility for Global Environment (Fonds Français pour l'Environnement Mondial) (FFEM) is a French public bilateral fund whose mission is to protect the global environment in developing countries, in the name of the French cooperation and development policy.

Its intervention strategy is steered by a committee gathering 5 ministries (Ministry of the Economy and Finance, Ministry of Foreign Affairs and International Development, Ministry of the Environment, Energy and Marine Affairs, Ministry of Agriculture and the Ministry for Research) and the French Development Agency (AFD). The AFD is responsible for the administrative and financial management of the FFEM and is hosting its secretariat. The current secretary general is Stéphanie Bouziges-Eschmann, who succeeded François-Xavier Duporge.

== History ==
The FFEM was created in 1994 by the French government following the United Nations Conference on Sustainable Development held in Rio de Janeiro in 1992. The French government wished to develop a funding instrument contributing to the protection of the environment, in the framework of the international commitments of France.

The FFEM resources are tapped by the French State budget and renewed every four years since 1994. For the 2011-2014 period, resources amounted to 95 million euros. Between 1994 and 2015, the FFEM participated to the financing of 285 projects, totalling 331 million euros.

== Missions ==
The FFEM's mission is to encourage developing countries to implement strategies and projects of sustainable development in the 6 following areas:

- biodiversity;
- climate change;
- international waters;
- land degradation, including desertification and deforestation;
- persistent organic pollutants (POPs);
- ozone layer.

Projets funded by the FFEM help to implement organizational methods and techniques which have a new and innovative feature.

The FFEM is also responsible to promote partnerships with research organizations, the private sector, local authorities and NGOs in the context of funding pilot projects. In addition to the funding of projects, the FFEM has a role of support and advice to the member institutions of its steering committee, for the development of the French positions on environmental and development matters.

The geographical areas of intervention of the FFEM are the developing countries and the emerging countries. Subsaharan Africa and Mediterranean region represent alone 69% of all the projects funded by the FFEM over the period 1994–2015.

=== Innovative Facility for the Private Sector in the area of climate change (FISP-Climat) ===
The FFEM has developed since 2013 this specific funding mechanism to support innovative development projects within the area of climate change, sponsored by businesses.

=== Strategic Programming Framework 2015–2018 ===
In its Strategic Programming Framework for the period 2015–2018, the FFEM has prioritized its financial commitments across five focus areas:

- Energy transition
- Sustainable urban territories
- Sustainable agriculture and forests
- Innovative financing of biodiversity
- Integrated management and resilience of coastal and marine areas

For the first time, the FFEM has also identified two cross-cutting objectives in accordance with the previous five focus areas. These objectives are sustainable consumption and production and innovative processes.

== Organization ==
=== Steering Committee ===
The steering committee is the decision-making body of the FFEM. It meets three times a year in order to decide on the general policy of the Fund, its geographical orientations, its fields of intervention, its methods, its resources as well as the financial commitments to projects. The following six bodies are gathered under the committee:

- the Ministry of the Economy
- the Ministry of Foreign Affairs
- the Ministry of the Environment
- the Ministry of the Research
- the Ministry of Agriculture
- the French Development Agency

=== Scientific and technical Committee ===
The Scientific and technical Committee is the consultative body of the FFEM. It is composed of twelve key figures who are recognized for their expert knowledge on economic, environmental and social issues. The Committee provides advice for the projects and strategies of the FFEM, along with working on scientific and technical aspects of the global environment.

=== Secretariat ===
The secretariat is the operational body of the FFEM. It is hosted by the French Development Agency (AFD), at its premises located at 5 rue Roland Barthes in Paris. It is responsible for implementing the decisions of the steering committee and follow-up on projects financed by the FFEM. Its role is also to develop relations with the institutional, economic, technical and scientific partners.
