= List of power stations in Namibia =

The following page lists all power stations in Namibia.

== Hydroelectric ==
Hydroelectric station	Community	Coordinates	Operator	Type	Capacity	Year completed	Name of reservoir	River
Ruacana Power Station	Ruacana		NamPower	Reservoir	330 MW	1978/2012	Ruacana Reservoir	Cunene River

== Solar power ==
Power plant	Community	Coordinates	Operator	Type	Capacity	Year completed
HopSol Hardap	Mariental		HopSol		47 MW	2018
HopSol Otjiwarongo	Otjiwarongo		HopSol		5 MW	2015
InnoSun Omburu	Omaruru		InnoSun		4.5 MW	2015
HopSol Otjozondjupa	Grootfontein		HopSol		5 MW	2016
Ejuva I	Gobabis				5 MW	2016
Ejuva II	Gobabis				5 MW	2016
Rosh Pinah Power Plant	Rosh Pinah	27°57′56″S 16°47′20″E	Old Mutual Investment Group (Namibia) (Pty)		5 MW	2017
Karibib Solar Power Plant	Karibib	21°56′54″S 15°50′20.5″E	MetDecci Energy Investment		5 MW	2017
TeraSun Energy Solar Power Station	Arandis	22°24′44″S 14°59′57″E	TeraSun Energy		81	2023 (expected)
Otjikoto Solar Power Station	Maxwell Farm, Otjozondjupa Region	21°41′14″S 16°56′07″E	Sustainable Power Solutions		10	2024 (expected)

== Thermal ==
Thermal power station	Community	Coordinates	Operator	Fuel type	Capacity	Year completed or completion expected	Notes
Van Eck Power Station	Windhoek		NamPower	Coal	120 MW	1972	As of 2015 only one block of 30 MW active
Paratus Power Station	Walvisbay		NamPower	Diesel	24 MW	1976	Standby station, currently only 16 MW
ANIXAS Power Station	Walvisbay		NamPower	Diesel	22.5 MW	2011	

== Wind ==
Wind farm	Location	Coordinates	Turbine model	Power per turbine (MW)	No. of turbines	Total Nameplate capacity (MW)	Commission date	Developer	Operator	Owner	Notes
Mile-7 wind turbine	Walvis Bay		Wind World W-2500	0.22	1	0.22	2005		Erongo RED		Experimental wind turbine, damaged by theft and lack of maintenance

== Biofuel ==
Thermal power station	Community	Coordinates	Operator	Fuel type	Capacity	Year completed or completion expected	Notes
Otjikoto Biomass Power Station	Tsumeb	19°13′26″S 17°42′30″E	NamPower	Wood Chips	40 MW	2027 (expected)	

== Pictures ==
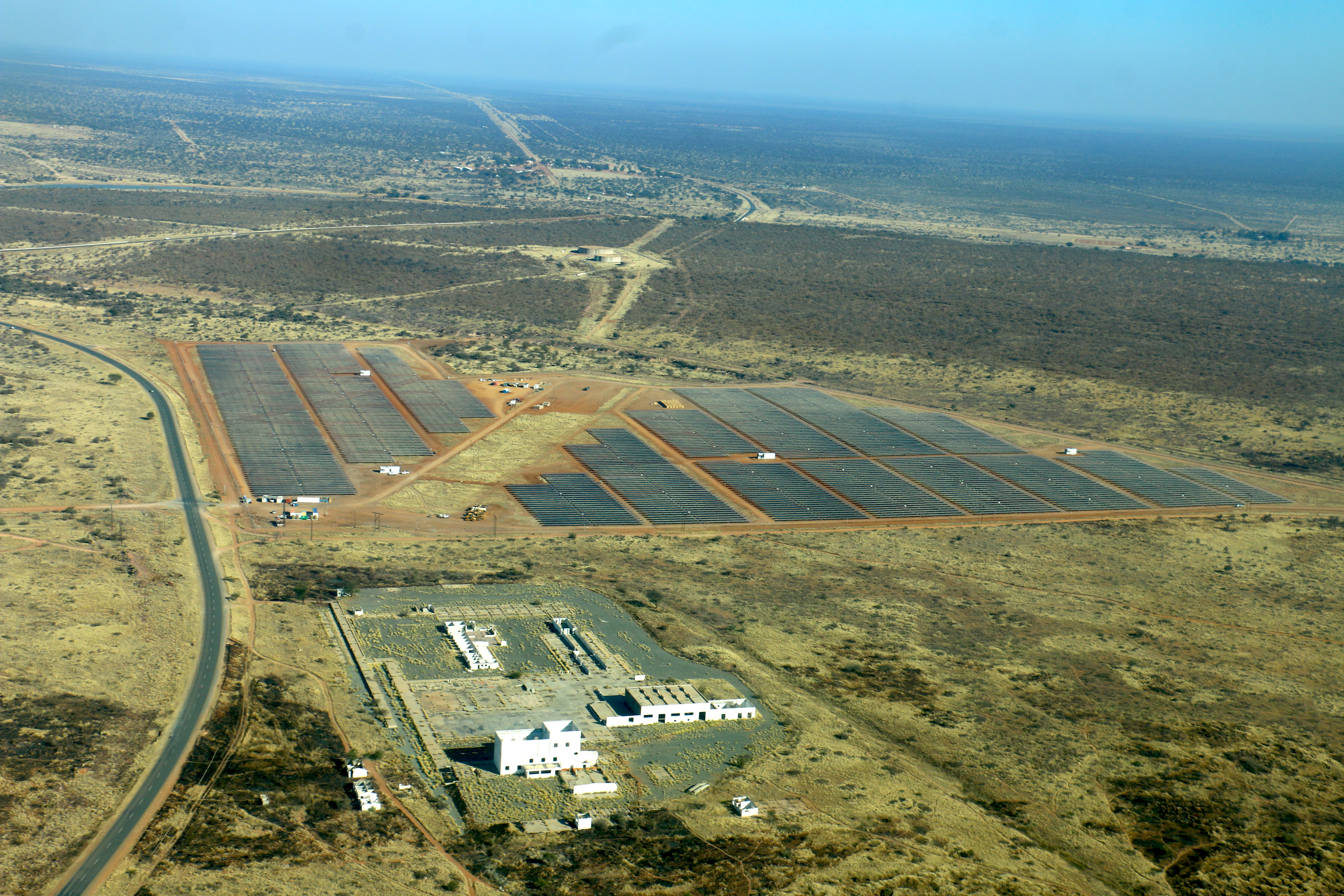
Gobabis Solar Power Station from bird's eye view (2017)

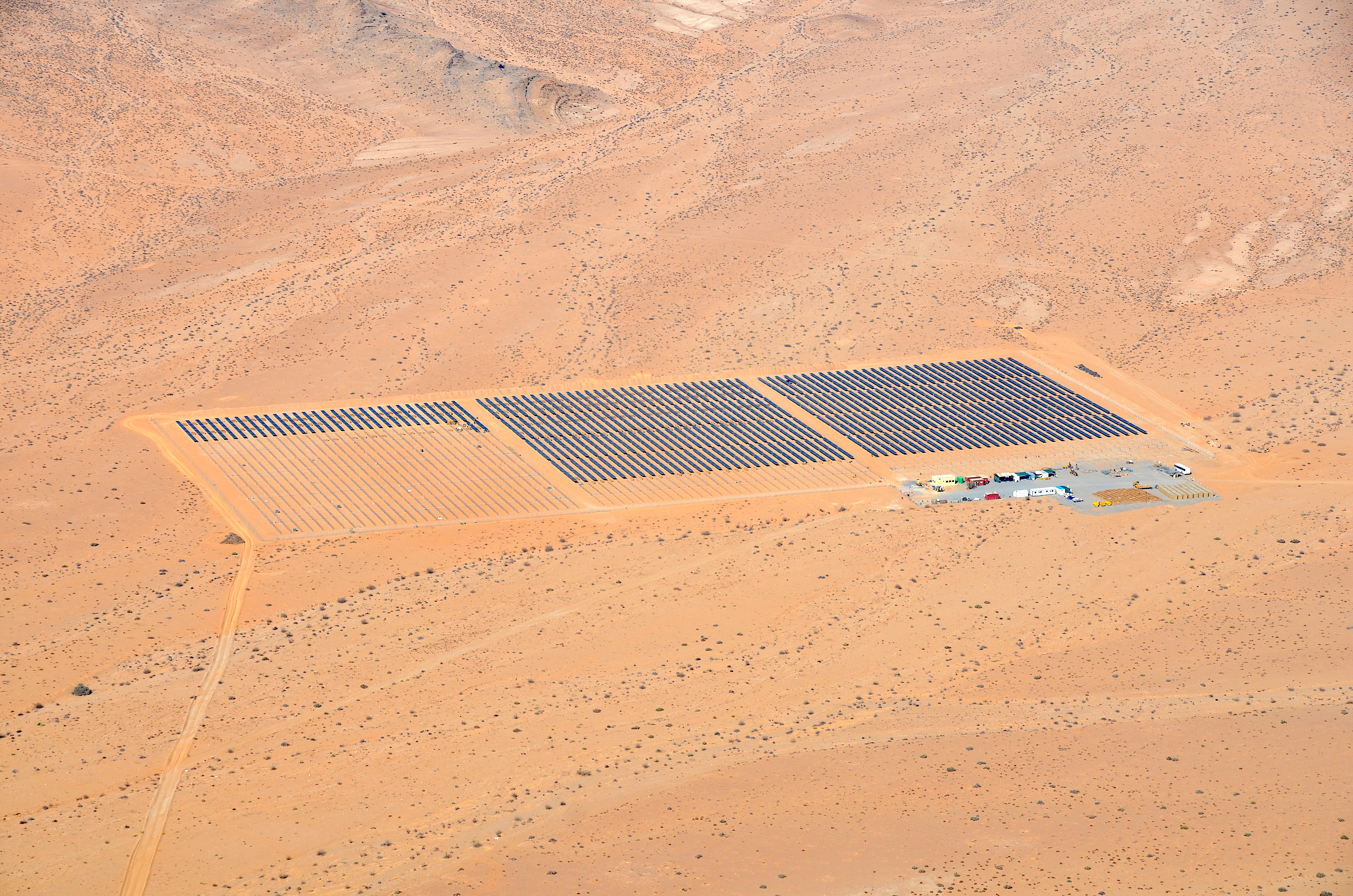
Aerial view of Power Plant Rosh Pinah before completion in 2017

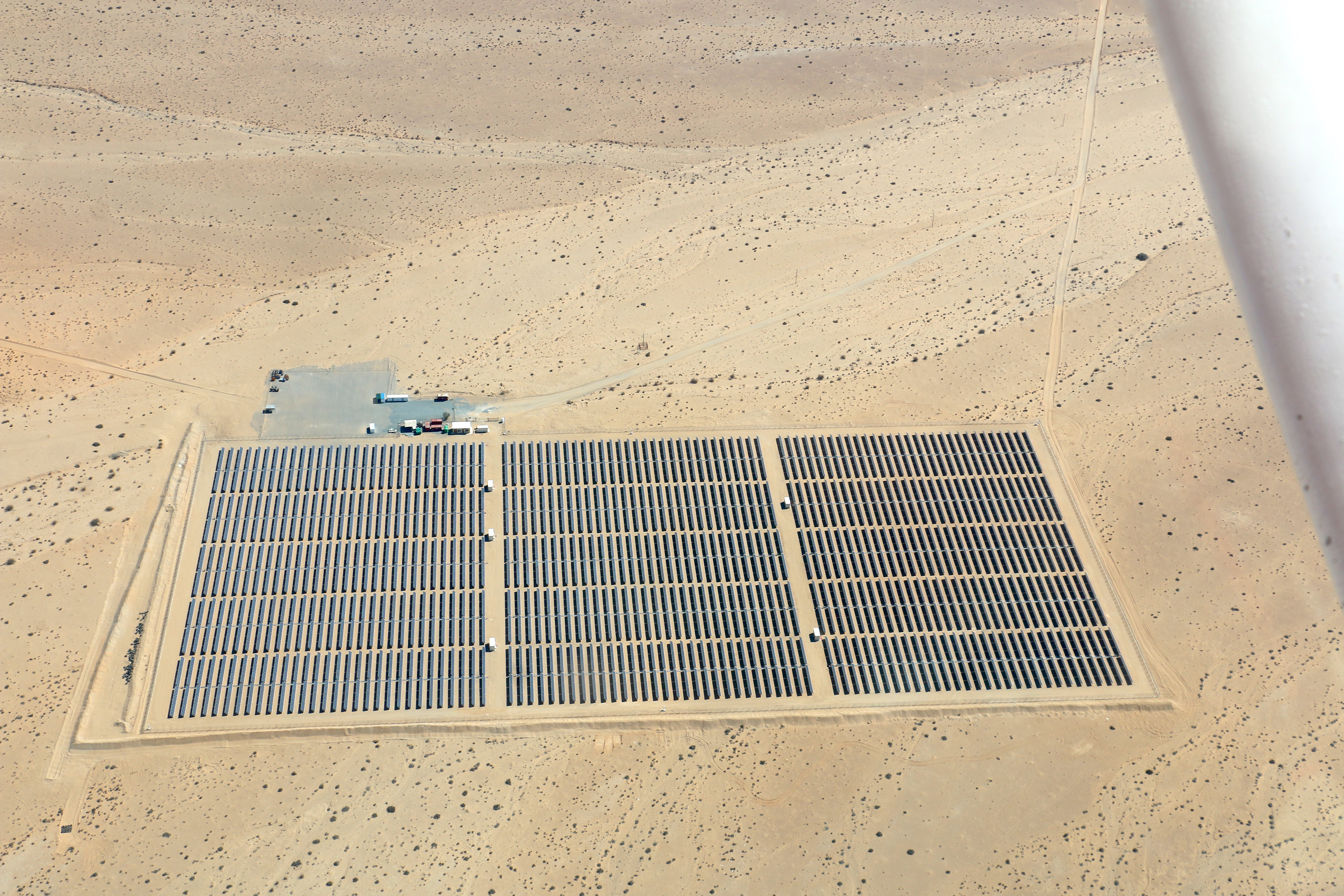
Aerial view of Power Plant Rosh Pinah after completion in 2017

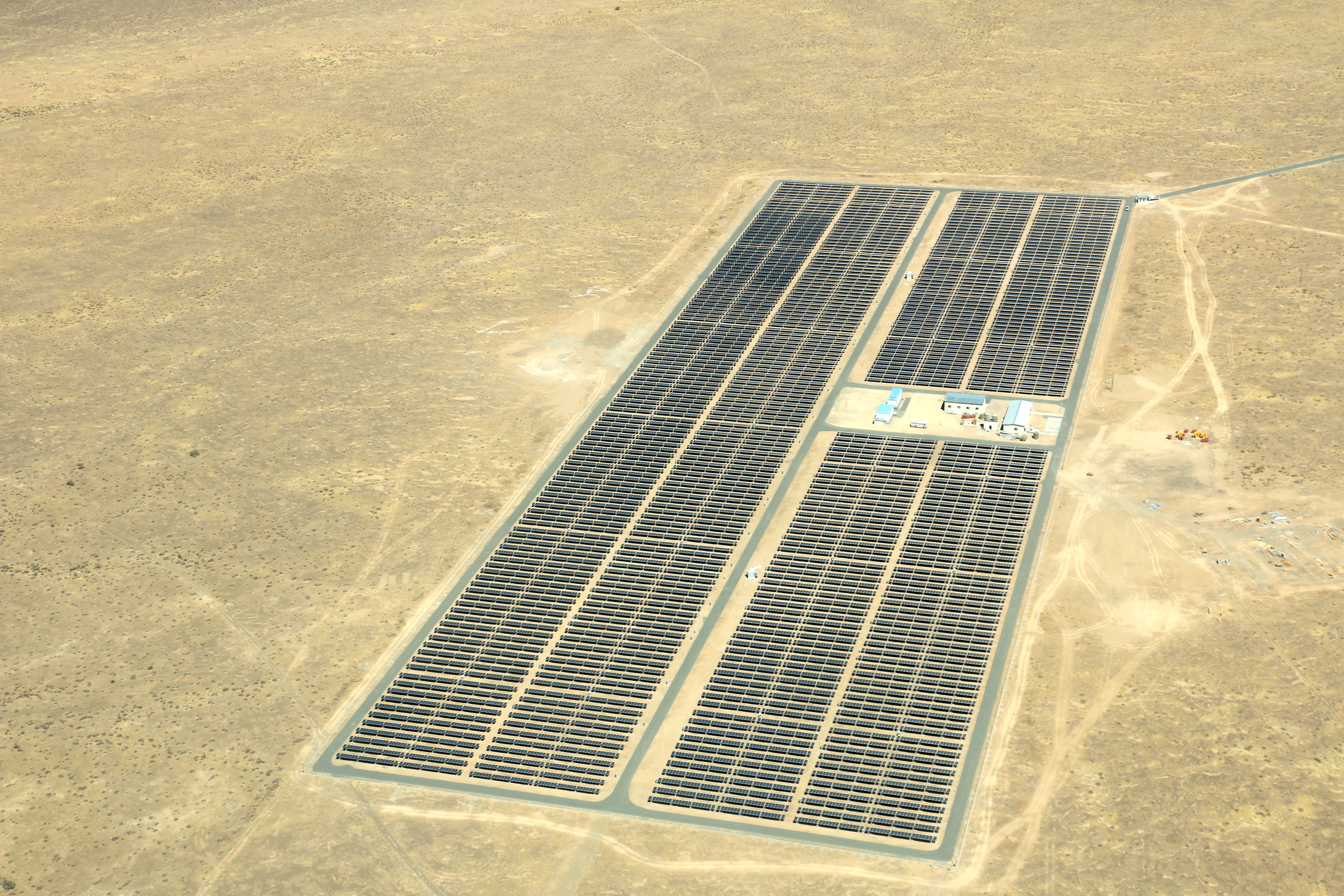
Solar Power Plant Greenam near Keetmanshoop (aerial view 2017)

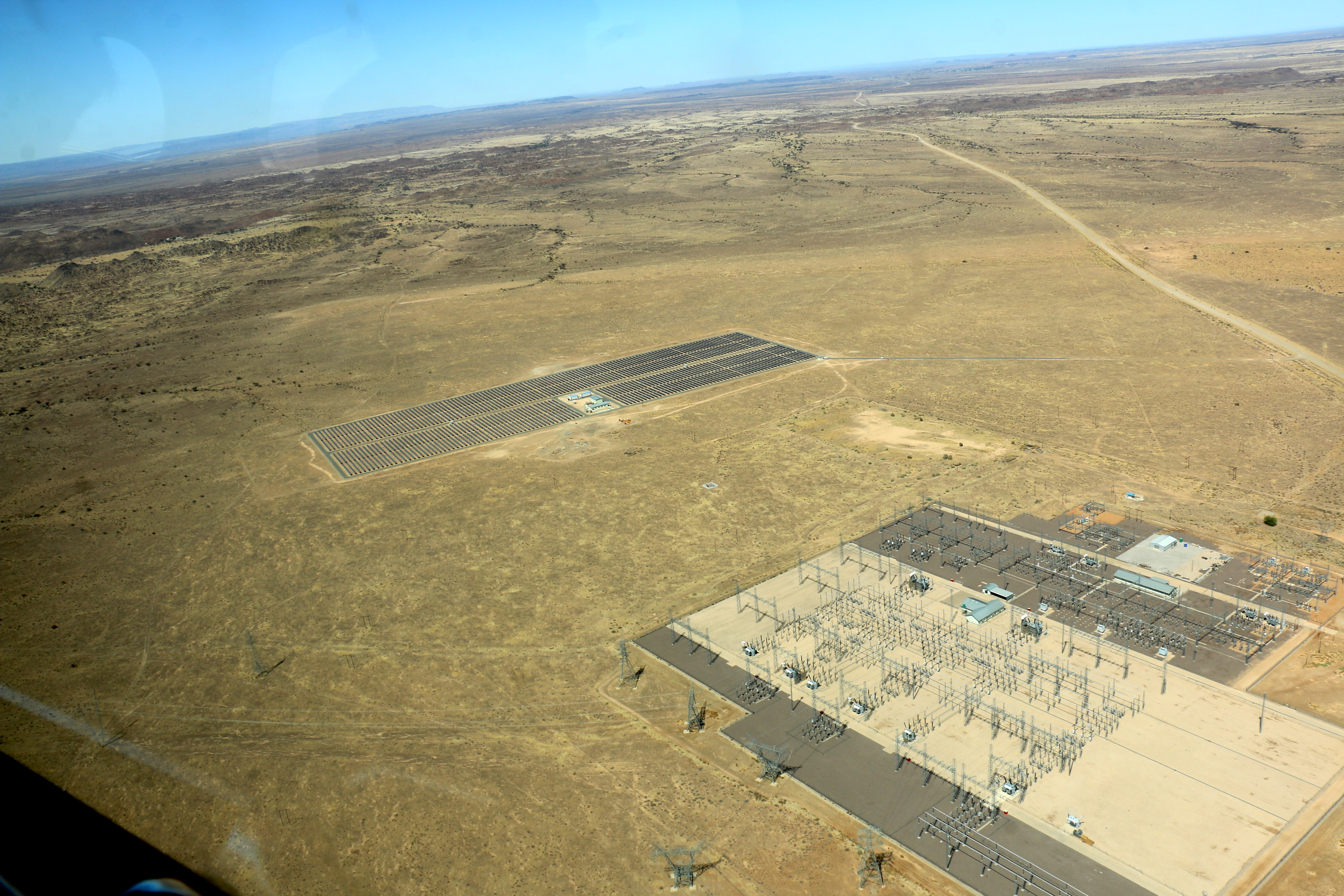
Solar Power Plant Greenam near Keetmanshoop (aerial view 2017)

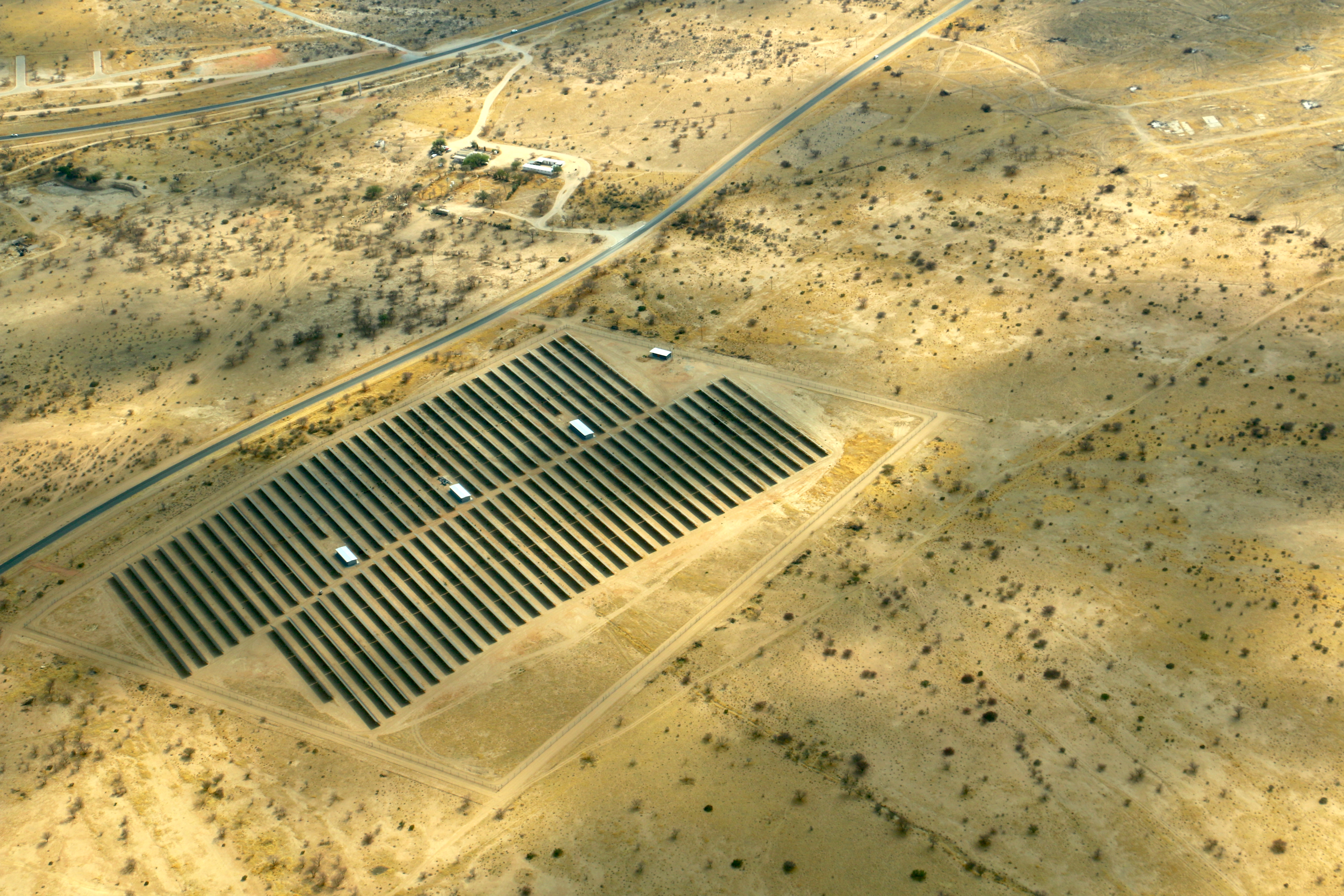
Solar Power Plant Karibib (aerial view 2017)

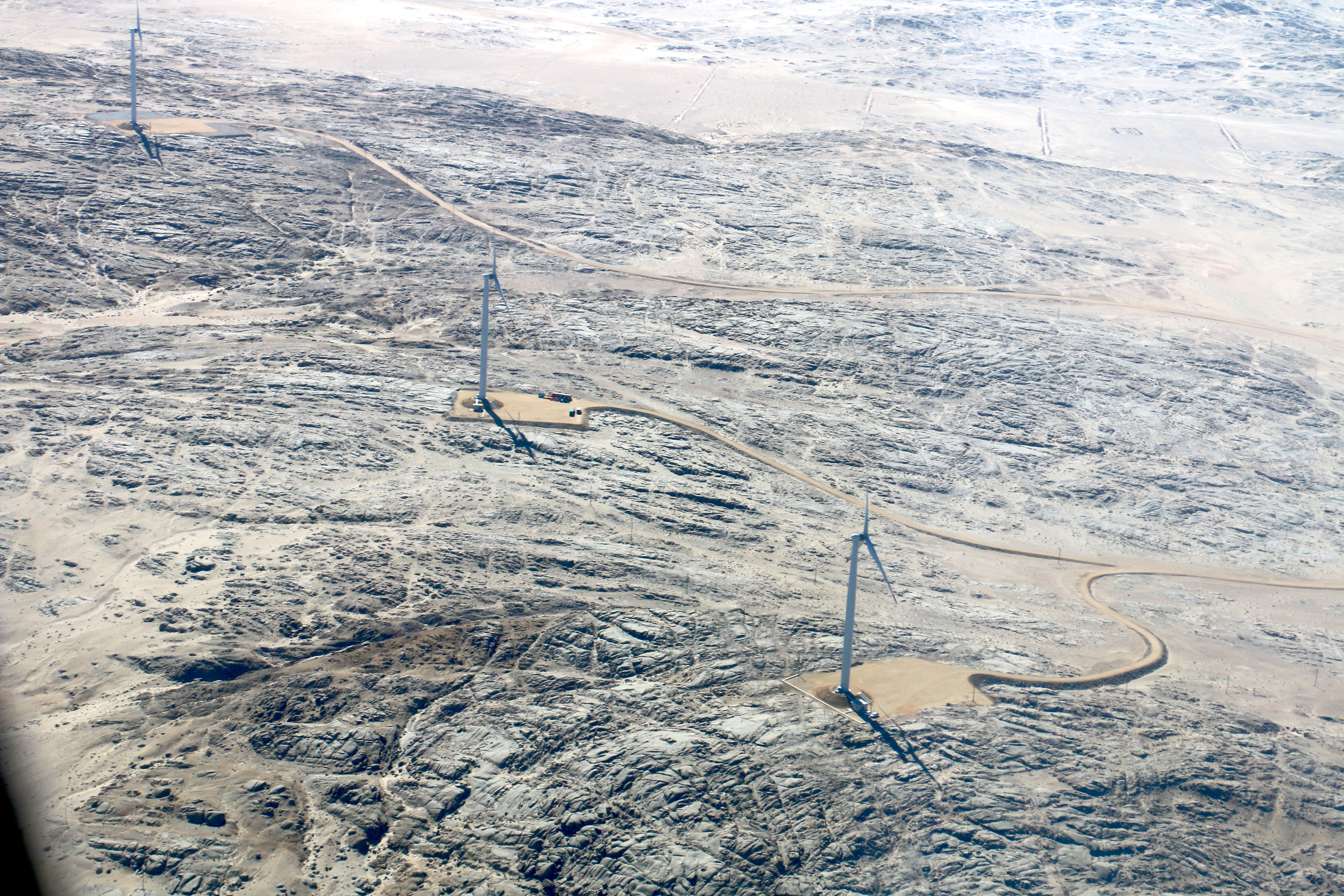
Wind Power Plant Lüderitz (2017)

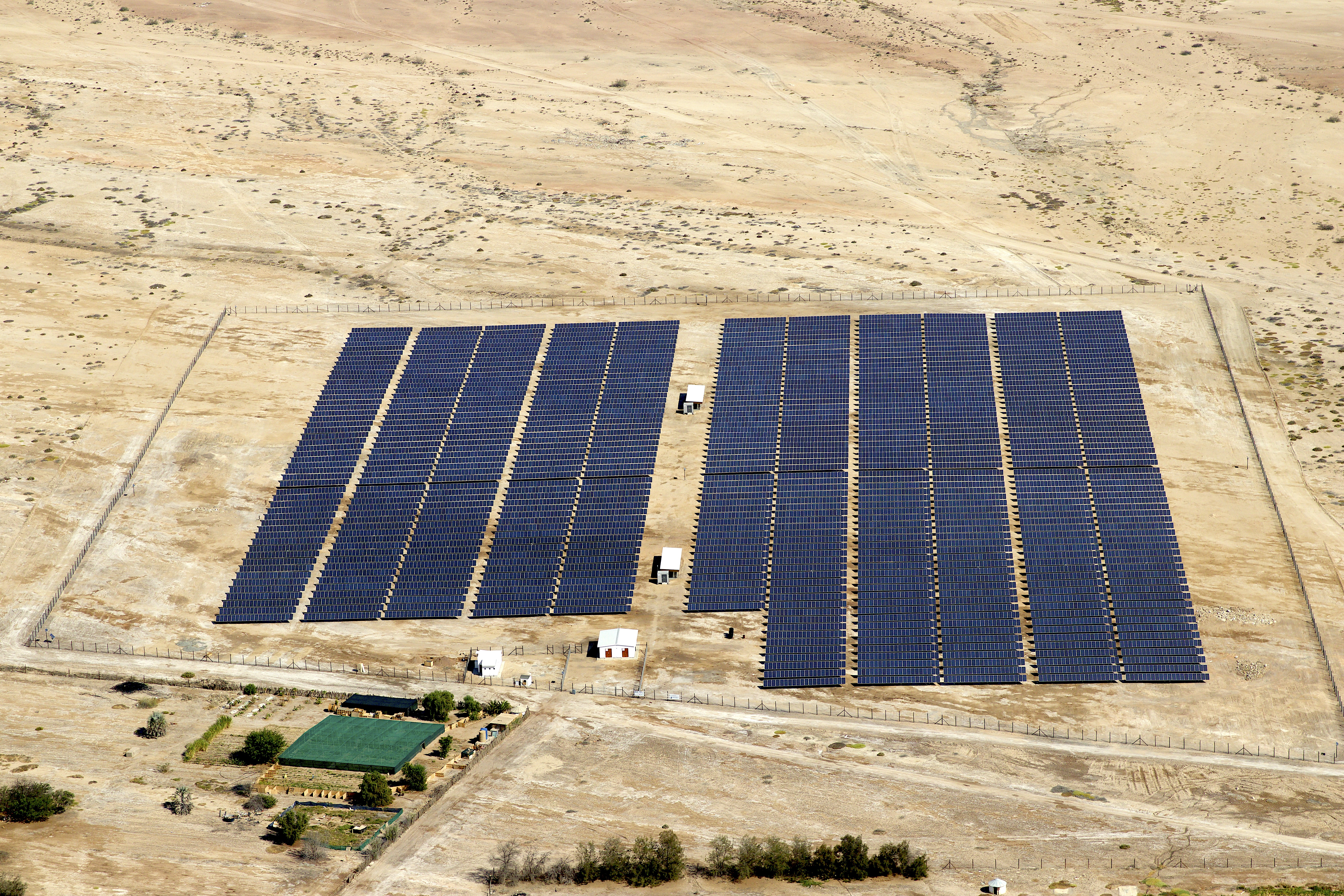
Power Plant Arandis (2018)

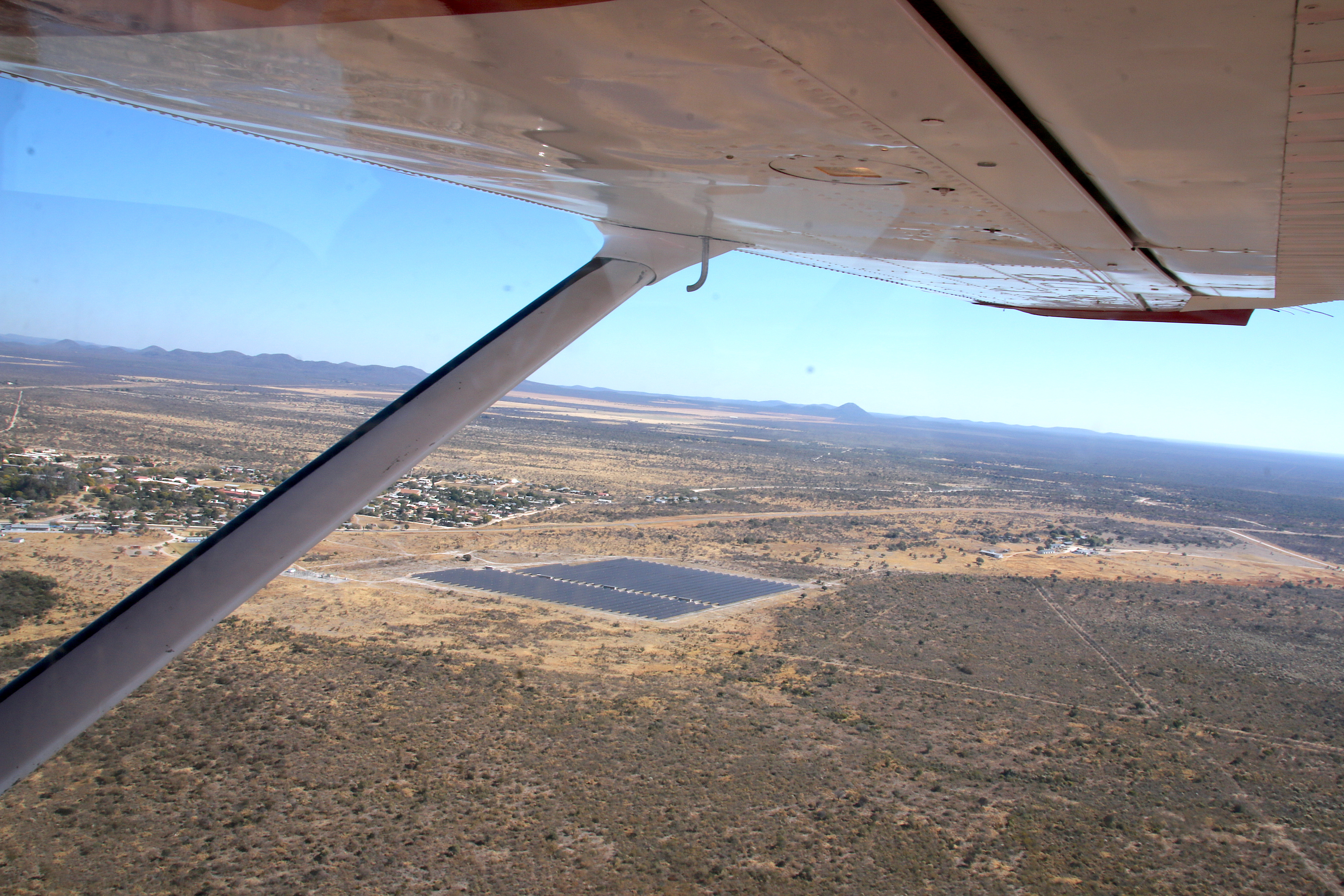
Power plant Grootfontein (2018)

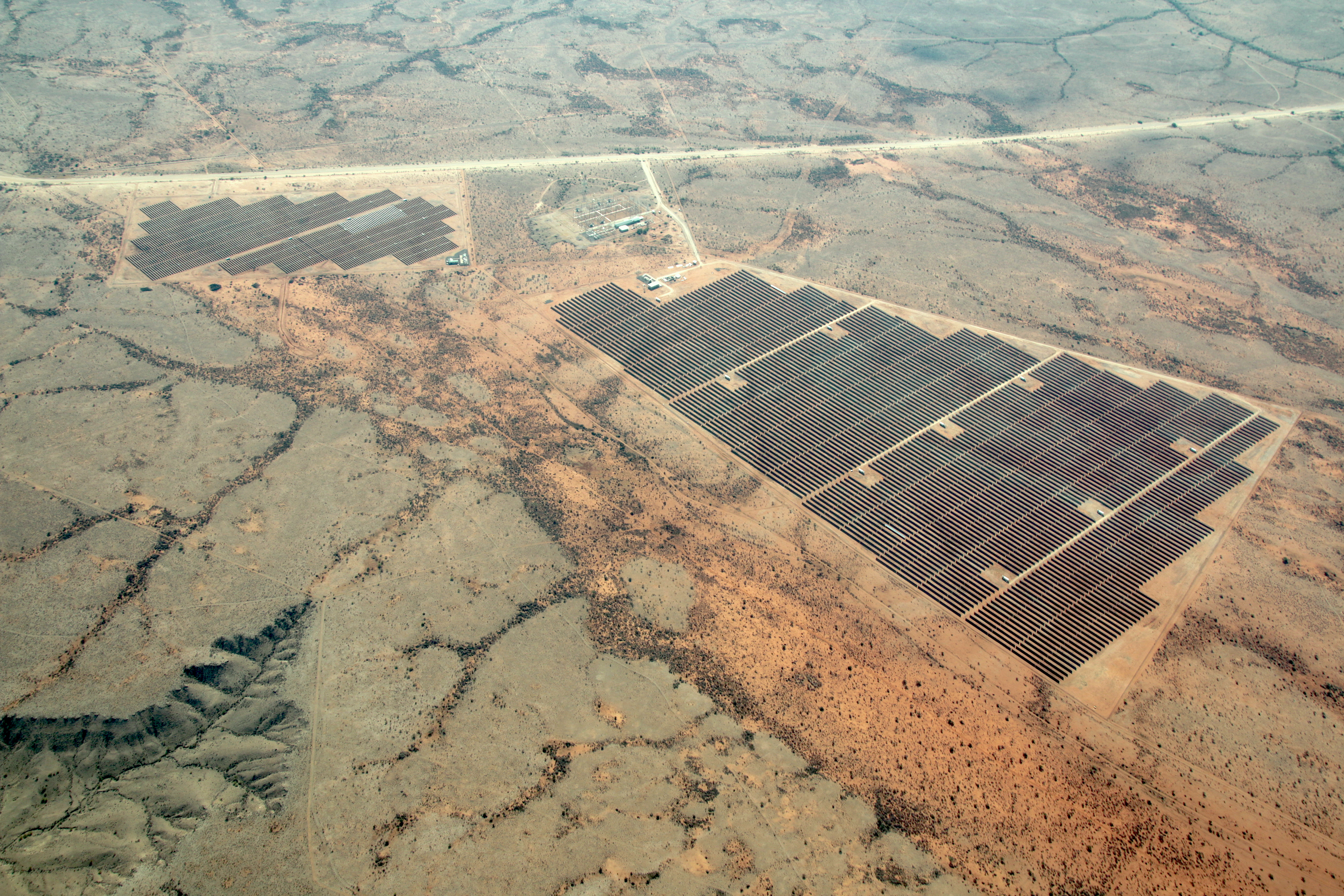
Power plant Mariental (2018)

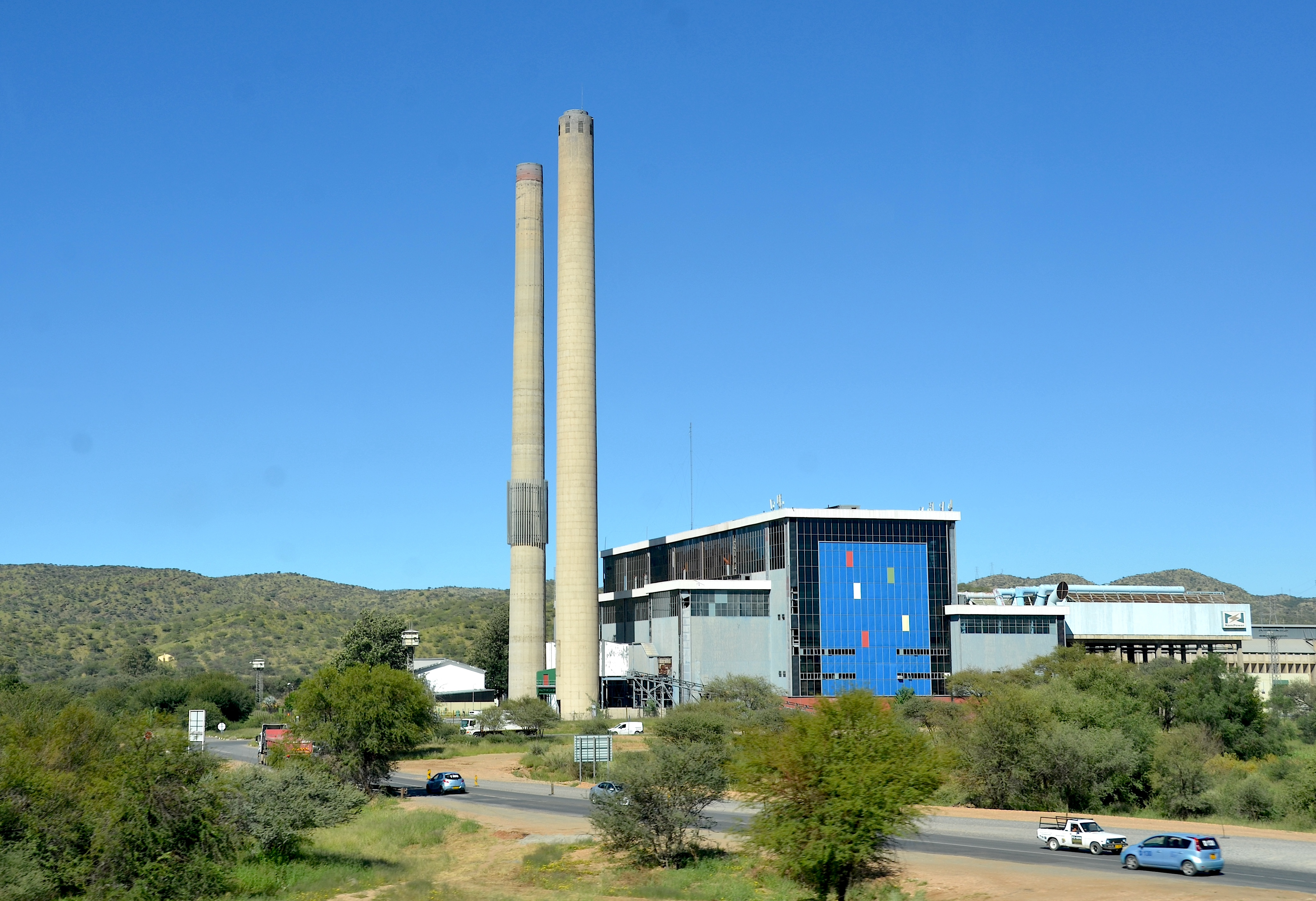

== See also ==
- List of power stations in Africa
- List of largest power stations in the world
