= NamPower =

Electricity utility company in Namibia

Namibia Power Corporation (Proprietary) Limited
- Type: Public utility
- Industry: Energy industry
- Founded: 19 December 1964; 61 years ago
- Headquarters: Windhoek, Khomas Region, Namibia
- Key people: Simson Haulofu (Managing Director); Daniel Motinga (Chairperson of the Board of Directors)
- Services: Electricity
- Parent: Government of Namibia
- Website: www.nampower.com.na

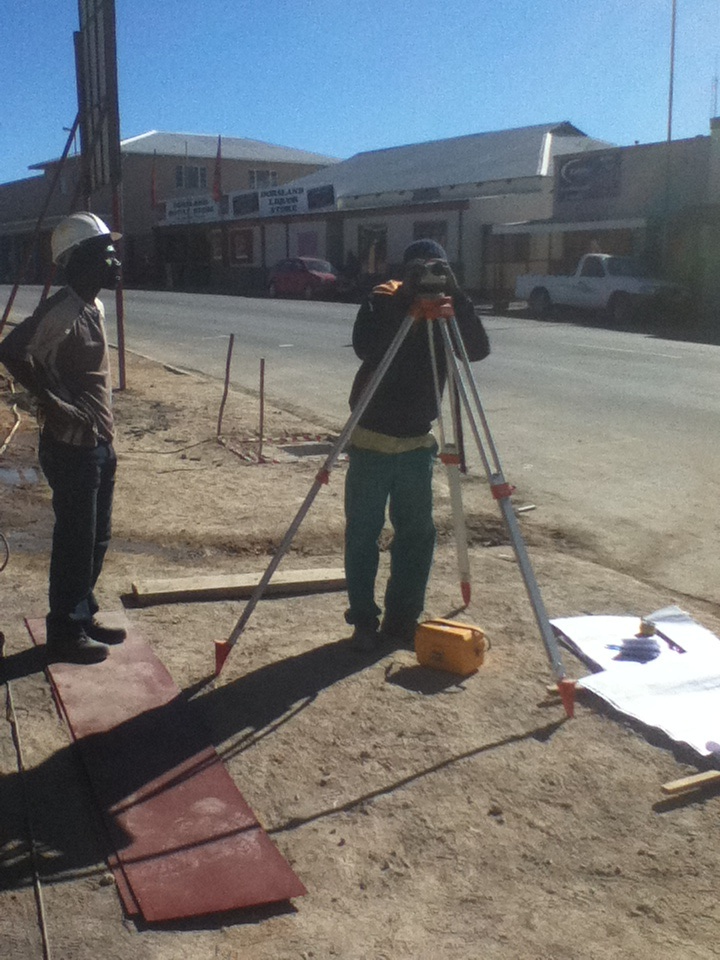
A NamPower employee at work

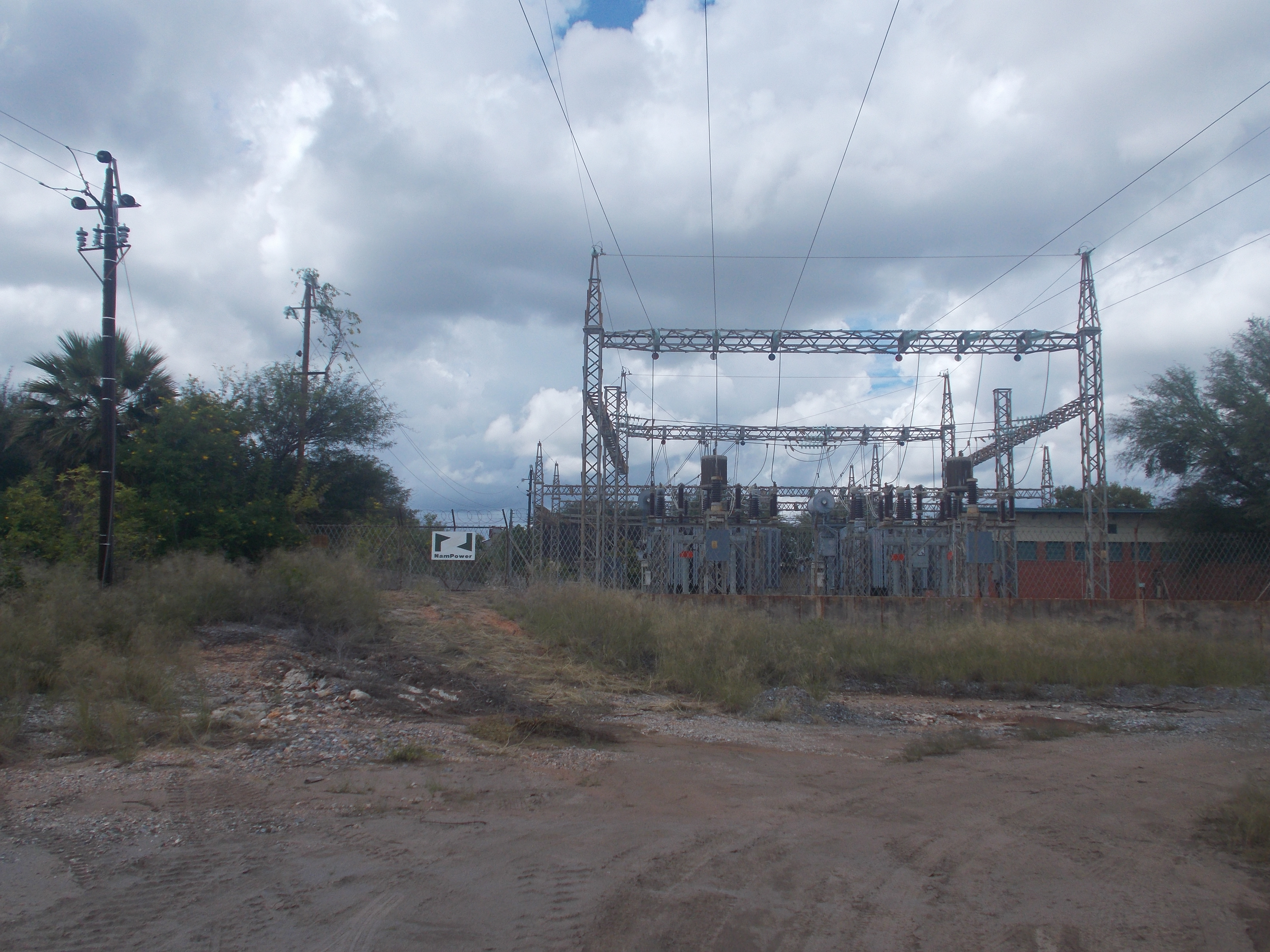
Electrical substation of NamPower

Namibia Power Corporation, commonly known as NamPower, is the national electric power utility company of Namibia. The company is responsible for generation, transmission and distribution of electricity in the country. Its activities are licensed, supervised and regulated by the Electricity Control Board (ECB) of Namibia.

== Location ==
The company headquarters are located at NamPower Centre, 15 Luther Street, Windhoek, Khomas Region, Namibia. The geographical coordinates of the company headquarters are 22°33'17.0"S, 17°05'07.0"E (Latitude:-22.554722; Longitude:17.085278).

== History ==
NamPower was founded in 1964 as the South West Africa Water and Electricity Corporation (SWAWEK) by the government of South Africa. SWAWEK was introduced as a company of the Industrial Development Corporation (IDC) of the Republic of South Africa. The early history of the company revolves around the Kunene River hydroelectric project. In 1996, several years after Namibia's independence, the company was renamed NamPower.

== Operations ==
NamPower operates 3 major electricity generating facilities:

1. Ruacana Hydroelectric Power Station, a hydroelectricity power plant on the Kunene River at Ruacana at the Angolan border, with installed capacity of 347 megawatts
2. Van Eck Power Station, a thermal facility located in Windhoek, powered by coal, with installed capacity of 120 megawatts
3. Anixas Thermal Power Station in Walvisbay, powered by diesel, with generation capacity of 22.5 megawatts.

There is also one standby diesel power station in Walvisbay, Paratus Thermal Plant, with 18 megawatts.

== Generation Projects ==
According to its 2020-2025 Integrated Strategic Business Plan, the power utility plans to add 250 MW generation capacity to the power grid through both fossil fuel renewable energy generation projects.

=== Natural gas ===
The 50 MW Anixas II Power Station was planned to be constructed by the second quarter of 2024 in Walvis Bay, running on low sulphur fuel oil, and both diesel and compressed natural gas as alternative fuels. The construction was however halted due to disagreements between the involved joint venture partners.

=== Solar ===
The Omburu Solar Power Station is a 20 MW solar photovoltaic (PV) power station in Omaruru, Erongo Region. It is owned by NamPower and was commissioned in June 2022.

The NamPower Rosh Pinah Solar Power Station is a planned 100 MW solar power plant at Rosh Pinah. NamPower has awarded a N$1.4 billion construction contract to a joint venture of China Jiangxi International Economic and Technical Cooperation and CHINT New Energy Development.

=== Woody Biomass ===
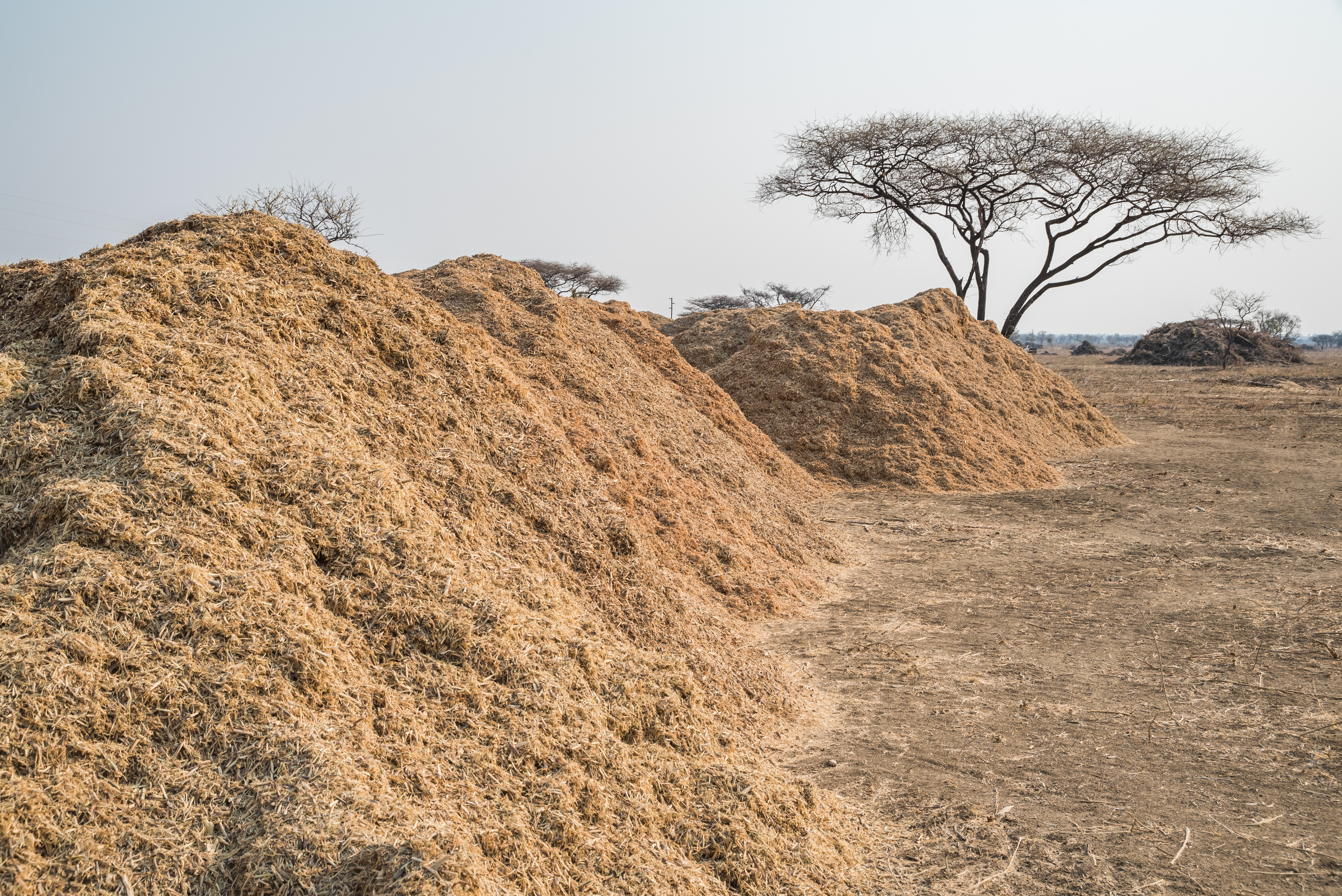
Heaps of chipped woody biomass in Namibia

NamPower conducted a feasibility study on a first biomass electricity plant in the country. The concept foresees the utilisation of excess woody biomass, of which the country possesses an estimated 400 million tonnes due to woody plant encroachment. Woody encroachment is the growth of bushes and trees at the expense of grass and is caused by overgrazing and climate change. In 2015 NamPower initiated the feasibility study on bush-to-electricity and formed a dedicated biomass project unit. Results and an investment decision are expected for early 2024. The planned 40 megawatts biomass power plant requires an annual supply of 180,000 to 240,000 tonnes of chipped biomass, which can be supplied from within a 50 kilometres (31 mi) due to around 10 tonnes of bush biomass harvestable per hectare. In 2023, NamPower engaged in a partnership with the Forest Stewardship Council for the purpose of introducing sustainability certification for the future biomass supply chain. The plant is expected to be completed in the first quarter of 2027, at an expected cost of N$ 2 billion.

== See also ==
- List of power stations in Namibia
