= List of ports in Angola =

This list of Ports and harbours in Angola details the ports, harbours around the coast of Angola.

== List of ports and harbours in Angola ==
Port/Harbour name	Province	Town name	Coordinates	UN/Locode	Remarks
Port of Luanda	Luanda Province	Luanda	8°45′S 13°16′E	AOLAD	Large-sized port, also known as ANGOLA. The port is located in the Luanda Bay, which is separated from the Atlantic Ocean by the island of Luanda. The largest port in the country and the main import and export terminal for long-haul cargo in the nation.
Port of Namibe	Namibe Province	Moçâmedes	15°11′S 12°7′E	AOMSZ	Medium-sized port. The maximum draught is 9.6 meters. It is located on the banks of the bay of Namibe, a coastal indentation linked to the Atlantic Ocean.
Port of Soyo	Zaire Province	Soyo	6°7′S 12°19′E	AOSZA	Medium-sized port.
Port of Lobito	Benguela Province	Lobito	12°19′S 13°34′E	AOLOB	Medium-sized port, located in Lobito Bay.
Port of Cabinda	Cabinda Province	Cabinda	5°32′S 12°11′E	AOCAB	Medium-sized port.
