= Camacuio =

- Municipality
- Location in Angola
- Coordinates: 13.992°S 13.060°E
- Country: Angola
- Province: Namibe

Area
  - Total: 7,452 km^{2} (2,877 sq mi)

Population (2014 Census)
  - Total: 50,349
  - Density: 6.756/km^{2} (17.50/sq mi)
- Time zone: UTC+1 (WAT)

Camacuio is a municipality in Namibe Province, Angola.

The municipality occupies 7452 square kilometers and has 50,349 inhabitants as of the 2014 census. It is bordered to the north by the municipalities Baía Farta and Chongoroi, to the east by the municipality of Quilengues, to the south by the municipality of Bibala, and to the west by the municipality of Namibe. It contains the communes of Camacuio-Sede, Chingo and Mamué.
