= Bibala =

Town in southern Angola

- Town
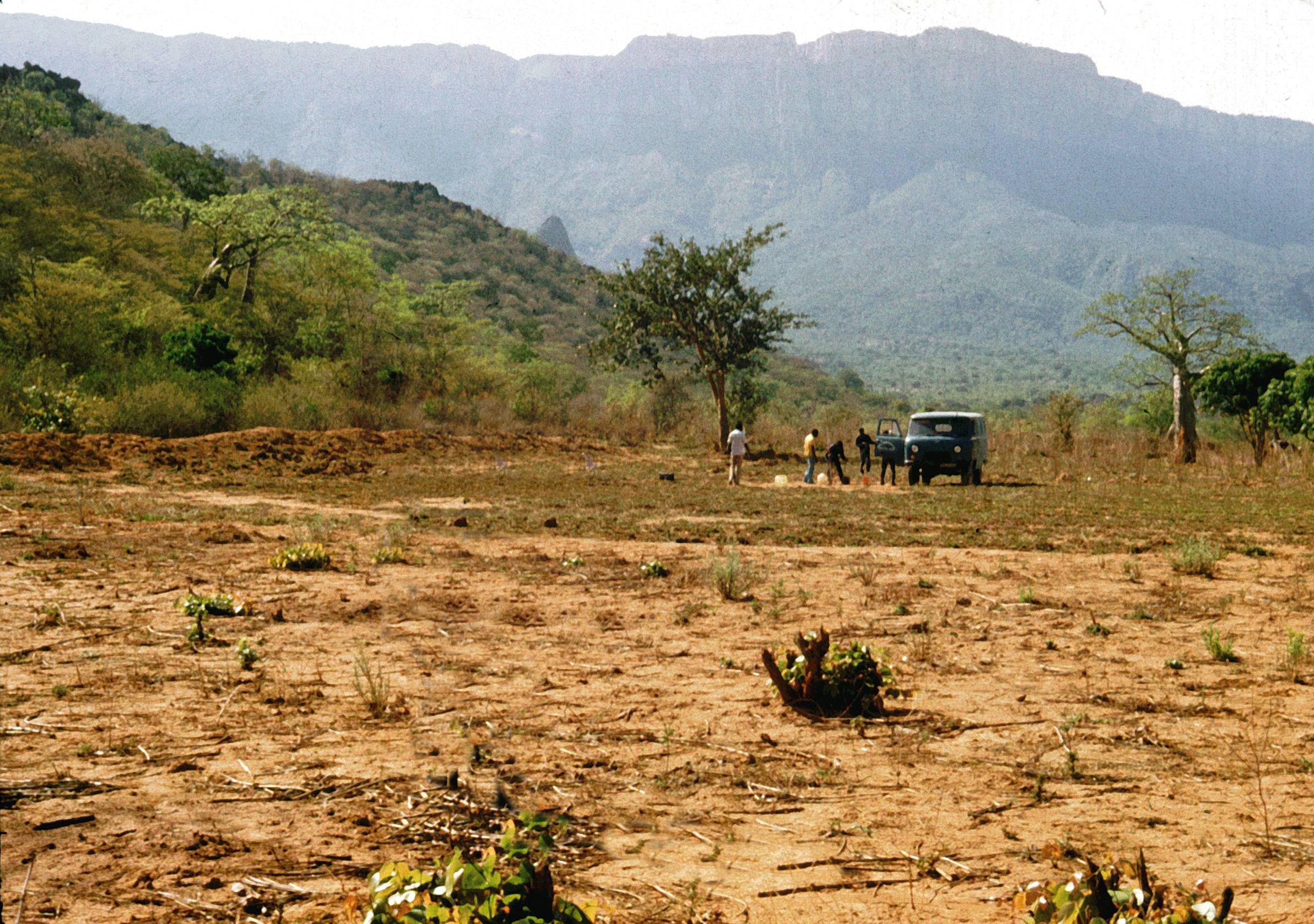
- Bibala landscape

- Location within Angola
- Coordinates: 14°46′00″S 13°21′00″E
- Country: Angola
- Province: Namibe
- Vila Arriaga (until 1975): February 1, 1912; 114 years ago
- Founded by: Portuguese colonizers

Population (2014)
  - Total: 10,500
- Time zone: UTC+1:00 (WAT)

Bibala (known as Vila Arriaga until 1975) is a town, with a population of 10,500 (2014), and a municipality in southern Angola. It lies in Namibe Province. The municipality of Bibala covers 7,700 square kilometres (3,000 mi^{2}) with a population of 64,504 (2014).

It is bordered to the north by the municipality of Camucuio, to the east by Quilengues, Cacula, Lubango and Humpata, to the south by Virei, and to the west by Namibe. It is composed of the communes of Bibala-Sede, Caitou, Lola e Kapagombe.

== History ==
The village developed under Portuguese colonial administration with the arrival of the Namibe Train on February 1, 1912. The village's original name was Vila Arriaga, after the Portuguese President Manuel José de Arriaga (1841-1917). Residential houses for the workers of the Mozambique Railroad were built here, and from then on the settling families continued to farm and breed cattle. Vila Arriaga became its own municipality on June 21, 1918. With the elevation to a small town (Vila) on December 13, 1965, Vila Arriaga became the seat of its own district. After Angola's independence in 1975, the Portuguese place name Vila Arriaga was replaced with the current name, Bibala.

== Transport ==
It is served by a station on the southern network of Angolan Railways.

== See also ==
- Railway stations in Angola
- Transport in Angola
