= List of lighthouses in Namibia =

This is a list of lighthouses in Namibia.

== Lighthouses ==
Name	Location	Coordinates	Year built	Structure	Focal height	Notes
Cape Cross	Cape Cross	21°46′20″S 13°57′20″E	1955-11	23 m tower	30 m MSL	
Diaz Point	Lüderitz	26°38′11″S 15°05′37″E	1910-10-01	28.8 m masonry tower	53 m HW	
Farilhao Point		22°09′31.08″S 14°17′17.11″E	1975	15 m pole	21.8 m MSL	discontinued 1989-02
Möwe Point		19°22′47.85″S 12°42′29.02″E	1979-02-05	10 m pole	29.2 m MSL	
Pelican Point	Walvis Bay	22°53′26″S 14°26′12″E	1915-06-15, 1932-05-01	31 m cast iron tower	34 m HW	
Shark Island	Lüderitz		1903	12 m masonry		discontinued 1910
Swakopmund lighthouse	Swakopmund	22°40′32″S 14°31′29″E	~1903	28 m masonry tower	35 m HW	
Terrace Bay		20°02′55.32″S 13°03′09.91″E	1979-02-13	6 m pole	36.9 m MSL	
Toscanini		20°49′57.94″S 13°23′48.16″E	1975-05	15 m pole	25.9 m MSL	discontinued 1989-06

== Gallery ==
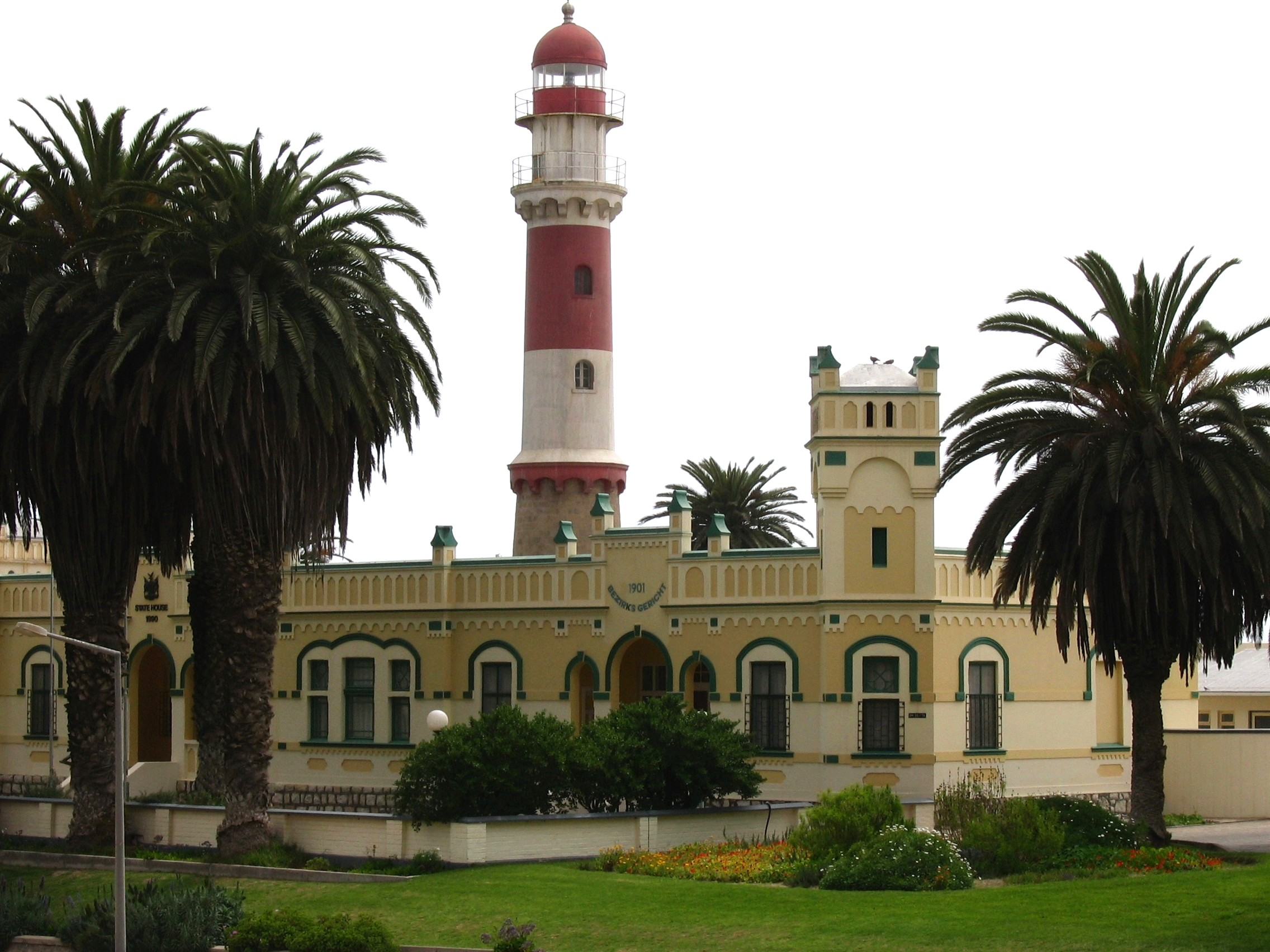
Swakopmund Lighthouse

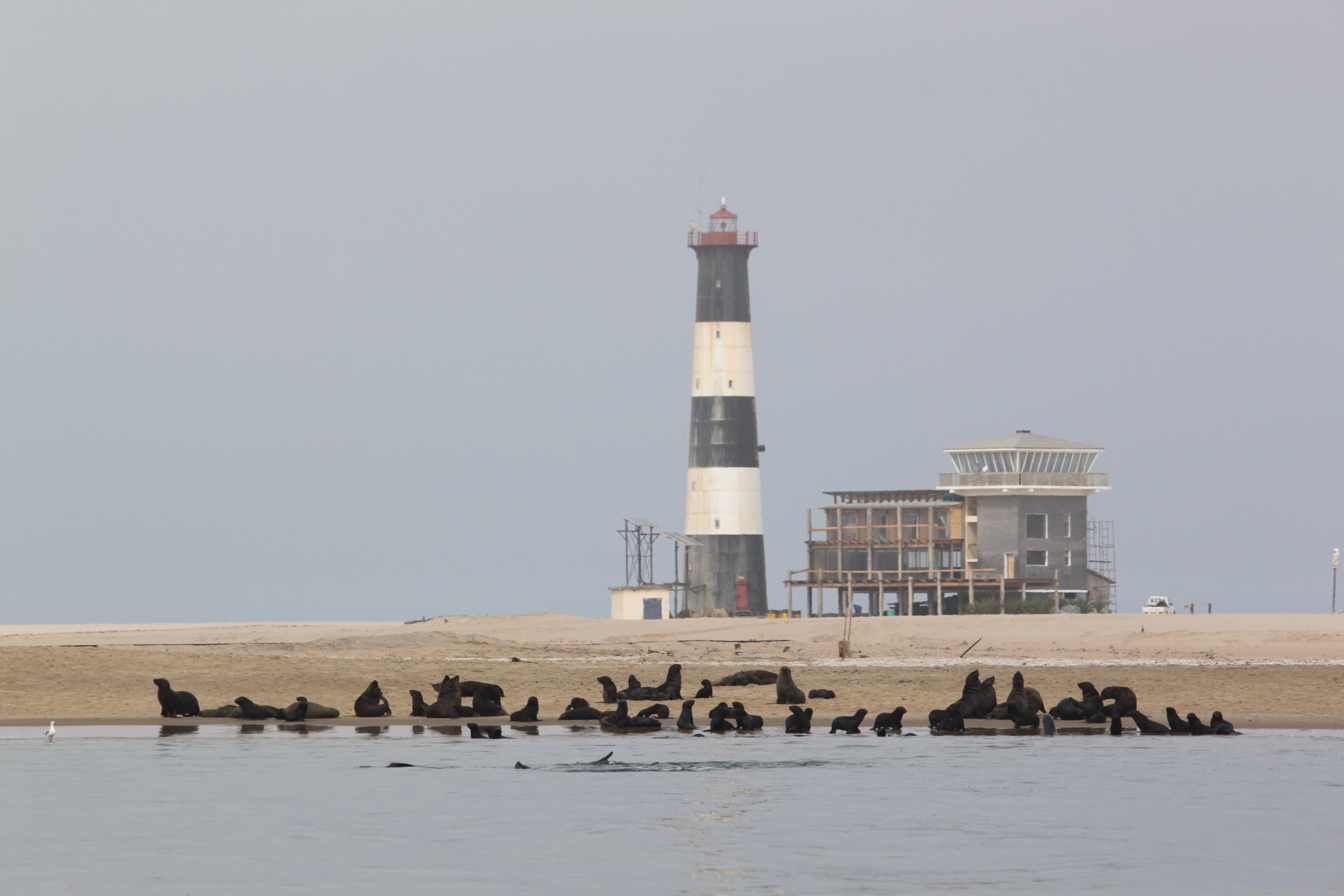
Pelican Point Lighthouse

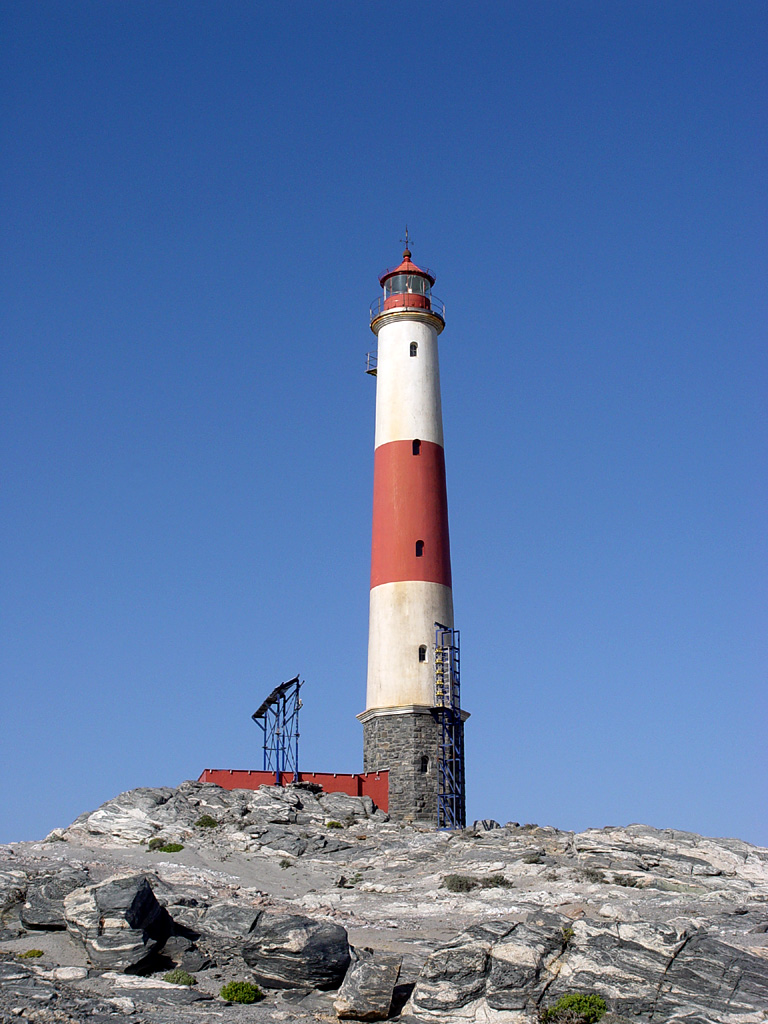
Dias Point Lighthouse

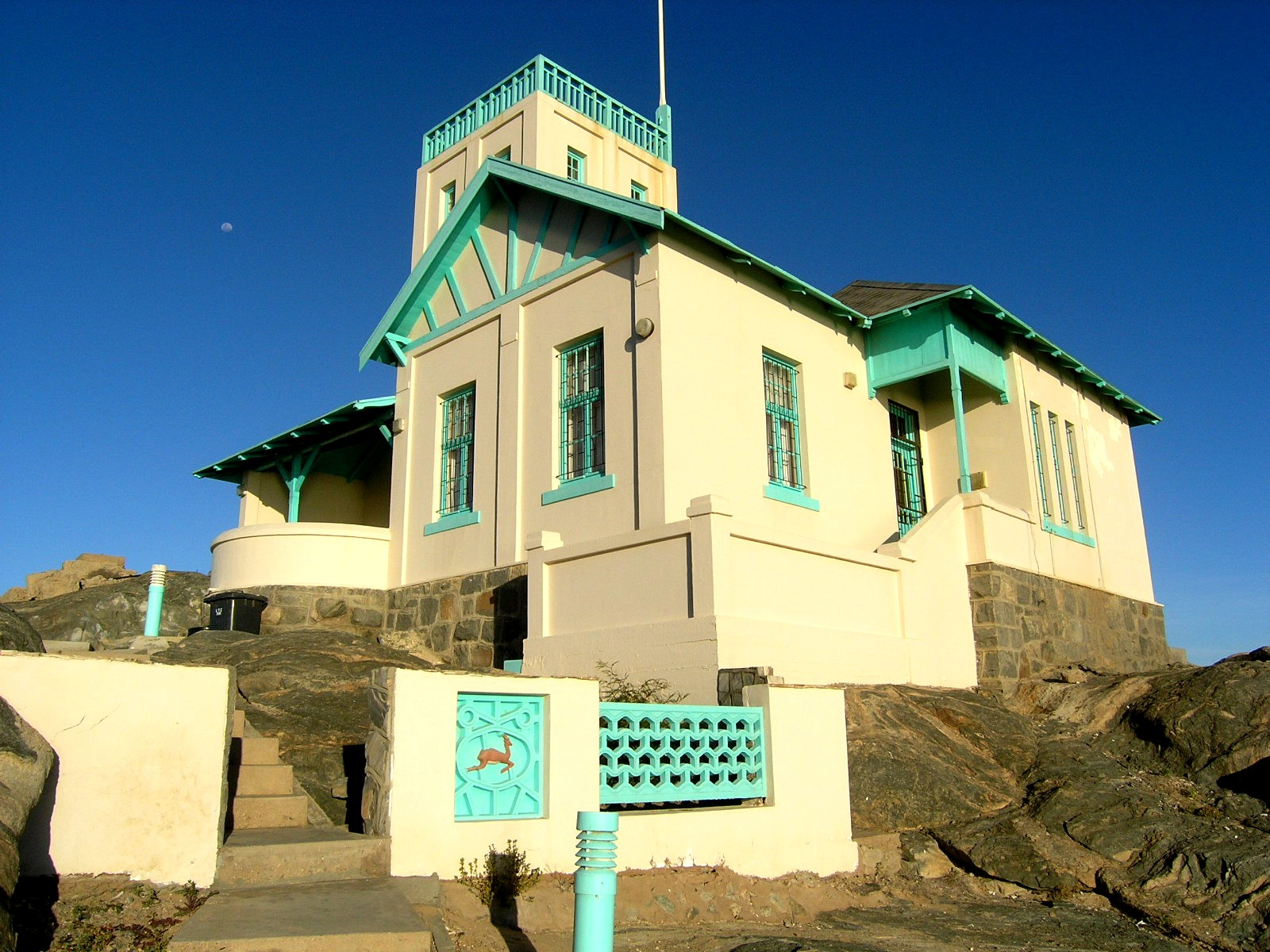
Original Shark Island Lighthouse

== See also ==
- List of lighthouses in Angola (to the north)
- List of lighthouses in South Africa (to the south)
- Lists of lighthouses and lightvessels
