= Tchitundu-Hulu =

Archaeological complex in Angola

- Location within Angola
- Interactive map of Tchitundu-Hulu
- 15°56′26.3″S 12°52′45.5″E
- Type: Rock art complex
- Location: Capolopopo, Virei, Namibe Province, Angola

Site notes
- Area: 1 kilometre (0.62 mi)
- Archaeologists: José Camarate França
- Discovered: 1952

Tchitundu-Hulu or Tchitundu Hulu is an archaeological complex of four rock art sites in the municipality of Virei, Namibe Province, Angola. Its paintings and petroglyphs are some of the oldest in Angola. Since 2017, it has been under consideration as a World Heritage Site.

== History ==
Tchitundu-Hulu Mumule was first visited in 1952 by archaeologist José Camarate França and the following year, he published the first report on the site. In 1954, H. Baumann published photographs and drawings of the sister site Tchitundu-Hulu Mucai. John Desmond Clark classified the site as belonging to the Central African group of rock art in a 1958 study. Henri Breuil studied the site as part of the Archaeological Mission of Angola and published his findings in 1964, which also detailed his excavations of Palaeolithic stone tools at the site. Joaquim Santos Júnior compiled all previous research on Tchitundu-Hulu and other Angolan rock art sites in 1974. Further studies were published in the 1970s and 2000s.

== Description ==
Tchitundu-Hulu is located in rural Capolopopo, municipality of Virei, Namibe Province, Angola, about 37 kilometres (23 mi) southwest of Virei and 150 kilometres (93 mi) south of Moçâmedes. The site sits on and around several inselbergs atop a high plain in an arid, sparsely populated semi-desert region.

The complex encompasses four sites: Tchitundu-Hulu Mumule, Tchitundu-Hulu Mucai, Pedra das Zebras, and Pedra da Lagoa, which are all located within 1 kilometre (0.62 mi) of each other. In local languages, tchitundu hulu is interpreted as meaning, variably, "hill of heaven", "hill of souls" or "sacred hill". In 1973, Santos Júnior added the distinctions mumule for the larger site, meaning "man"; and mucai, meaning "woman", for the smaller. In the Portuguese language, "pedra das zebras" and "pedra da Lagoa" mean "rock of the zabras" and "rock of the pond" in Portuguese, respectively. Engravings at the site are largely geometric—concentric circles, lines, etc.—but also include, to a lesser extent, naturalistic forms (i.e. representations of humans, animals, and plants). Engravings were primarily created by perforating the stone or through abrasion.

=== Tchitundu-Hulu Mumule ===
Tchitundu-Hulu Mumule is the largest and most important site, covering the slopes of a 726-metre-high (2,382 ft) inselberg in engravings. At the peak is a rock shelter containing more than 180 paintings. Most of the art is geometric, although some naturalistic figures do exist. Santos Júnior described 4 antelopes, 2 snakes and a jackal on his visits in 1970 and 1972. The paintings were primarily done with red and white pigments.

=== Tchitundu-Hulu Mucai ===
Tchitundu-Hulu Mucai is located about 1 kilometre (0.62 mi) from Tchitundu-Hulu Mumule and contains both engravings and paintings in a rock shelter. This shelter is 6.7 metres (22 ft) high, 11.4 metres (37 ft) long, and reaches a depth of 11.3 metres (37 ft). The position and orientation of the shelter largely protects the interior from the natural elements.While the designs are predominately geometric, there some humanoid and animal figures; most of the paintings are red, black or white. Popular motifs are elongated "sausage-like" designs; zoomorphs, particularly felines; and other geometric circular or line drawings. Some of these designs may depict hunting scenes.

=== Pedra da Lagoa ===
Pedra da Lagoa sits atop a low hillside about 1 kilometre (0.62 mi) from Tchitundu-Hulu Mulume and consists of geometric and naturalistic engravings. The site constitutes two groups of engravings, one much older than the other, as determined by the distinctions between the depth and patina on the markings.

=== Pedra das Zebras ===
Located near Tchitundu-Hulu Mulume, this site is atop a low hill and is the smallest site and consists mainly of geometric circle designs.

== Analysis ==
The age, authorship, and purpose of the site are all unclear and disputed. Radiocarbon dating of material excavated at Tchitundu-Hulu Mulume suggested the 1st millennium BC, but samples taken from pigments at the same site returned a date in the first centuries of the 1st millennium AD. Lithic stone tools associated with the site were attributed by archaeologists in the 1950s and 1960s to the Middle Stone Age and Late Stone Age.

Authorship is attributed to one or more of the tribes who have historically inhabited the area. Some scholars variably ascribe the complex to the Cuissi or Ova Kuvale; however, as neither tribe has reported knowledge of who created the site, other publications attribute the site to an as-yet unknown group, or as a collaboration of many different groups over a long period of inhabitation.

== Preservation ==
Tchitundu-Hulu has been the subject of discussion around its preservation and its importance to Angola's cultural heritage. Although its very rural location protects it from vandalism, the exposed art is prone to natural erosion and potential visitors and animals unintentionally disturbing the site. Mulume, in particular, is in an advanced state of decay as the surface of the rock containing the engravings has been heavily eroded and is prone to landslides and displacement. Additionally, visitors to the site may unknowingly damage the art by walking over or near it. Other threats to the site's conservation are bird and insect activity inside the rock shelters and the accumulation of vegetation during the rainy season.

In March 2011, the Angolan Ministry of Culture hosted a workshop attended by specialists from several international institutions to develop a preservation plan.

On 9 May 2017, it was nominated to become a World Heritage Site.

== See also ==
- Archaeology of Angola
