= Porto Alexandre, Angola =

Tômbwa Lighthouse Porto Alexandre Ponta do Port
- Location: Tômbua, Namibe Province, Angola
- Coordinates: 15°47′02″S 11°51′03″E

Tower
- Constructed: 1930s
- Foundation: masonry base
- Construction: metal skeletal tower
- Height: 8 m (26 ft)
- Shape: tripod skeletal tower atop a 1-storey building
- Markings: white building with orange diagonal band
- Operator: Instituto Marítimo e Portuário de Angola

Light
- Focal height: 11 m (36 ft)
- Range: 9 nmi (17 km; 10 mi) (white), 7 nmi (13 km; 8.1 mi) (green)
- Characteristic: Oc(3) WG 9s

Porto Alexandre, occasionally known in English as Port Alexander, is a bay in Angola. It is located in the Namibe Province.

== Geography ==
Porto Alexandre is a very well-sheltered bay of the South Atlantic Ocean. The bay is facing east, with 41 m (135 ft) high sandstone cliffs rising from the Ponta do Porto, the promontory guarding the eastern end of the harbour located at the end of the protecting landspit. Saco da Baleia is a bay located west of the western end of the spit.

The town of Tômbua is located on the southern shore of the bay. It was formerly a whaling port, but currently it is an important harbor for oil production and fishing in the area. The port has refrigeration facilities installed with European Union assistance at the Tombwa canning factory.

== See also ==
- List of lighthouses in Angola
- Geography of Angola
