= Tigres Strait =

Strait in Angola

- Estreito dos Tigres (Portuguese)
- Location in Angola
- Coordinates: 16°38′S 11°46′E
- Ocean/sea sources: Atlantic Ocean
- Basin countries: Angola
- Max. length: 35 km (22 mi)
- Max. width: 9 km (5.6 mi)
- Islands: Tigres Island

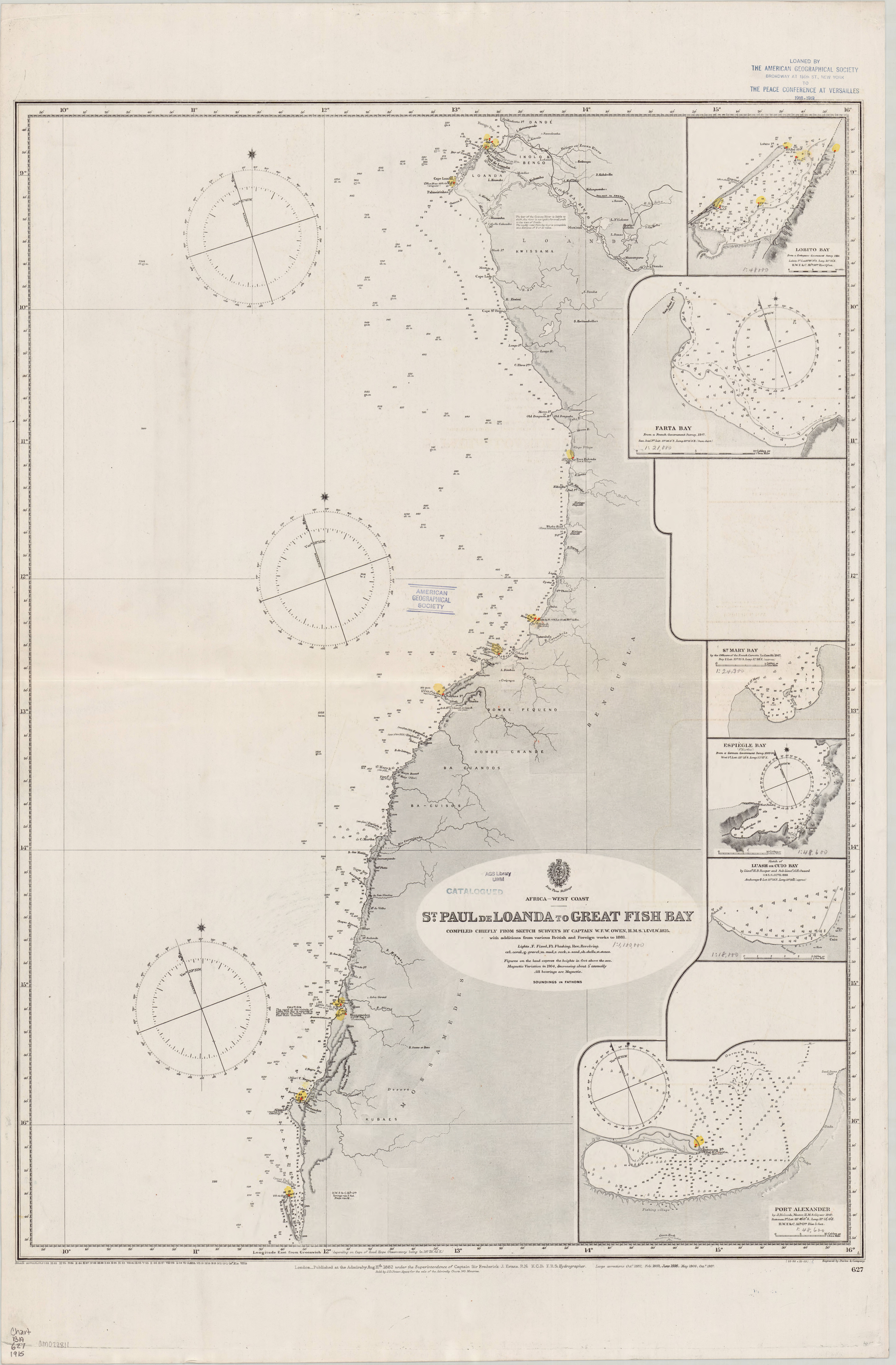
Nautical chart from 1882, in which the strait still appears as a bay. The Tigres Strait appears as “Great Fish Bay”.

The Tigres Strait, formerly known as Tigres Bay or Great Fish Bay, is a strait in Angola, located in Namibe Province, serving as a separation between the Angolan mainland and the Tigres Island.

== Geography ==
It once had a small peninsula on its eastern side, with its isthmus in the south and a well established fishing village named Saint Martin of the Tigers (in Portuguese: São Martinho dos Tigres). The ocean broke through the isthmus of the peninsula in 1962 and the water line was severed. Tigres became an island overnight, Tigres Island, the largest island of Angola.

Currently, most of the area of the former bay has become a strait between the island and the mainland. Of the original bay, only a small inlet open to the north —the Saco dos Tigres— remains at the southern end.

== History ==
On 6 December 1904 the Russian fleet proceeding to the pacific to fight the Battle of Tsushima of stopped at the bay to take on coal. They left the following afternoon. The British HMS Barrosa arrived the next day looking for the fleet before heading to Moçâmedes.

== See also ==
- Geography of Angola
