= Baía de Santa Marta =

Baia de Santa Marta
- Baía das Luciras (Portuguese)
- Location in Angola
- Coordinates: 13°51′S 12°29′E
- Ocean/sea sources: Atlantic Ocean
- Basin countries: Angola
- Max. length: 2 km (1.2 mi)
- Max. width: 4.5 km (2.8 mi)
- Settlements: Lucira
- Cabo de Santa Marta Lighthouse
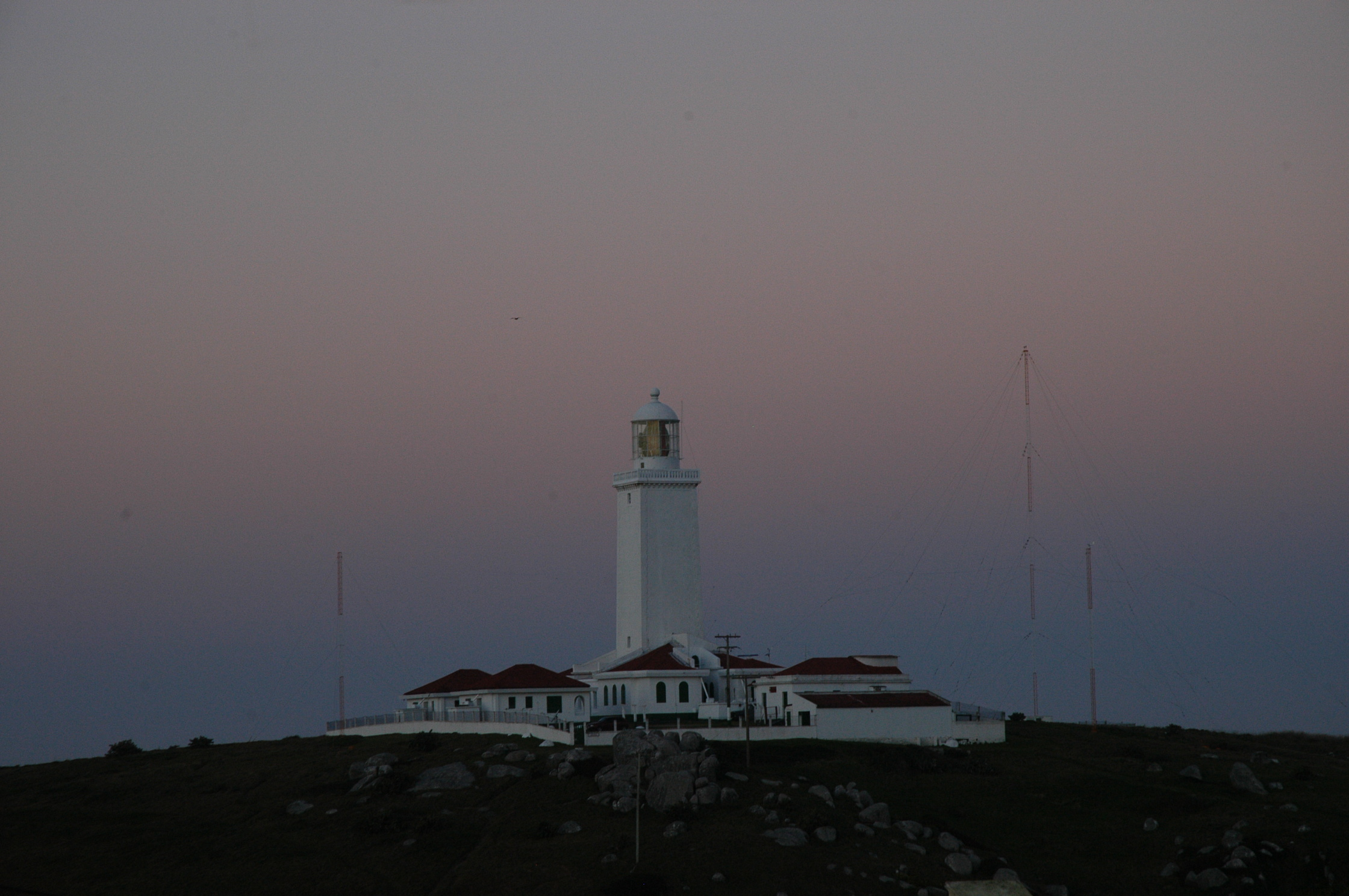
- Coordinates: 13°52′42″S 12°25′23″E
- Constructed: ~1930s
- Foundation: masonry base
- Construction: masonry tower
- Height: 14 metres (46 ft)
- Shape: hexagonal tower with balcony and light
- Markings: white tower
- Operator: Instituto Marítimo e Portuário de Angola
- Focal height: 48 metres (157 ft)
- Range: 12 nautical miles (22 km; 14 mi)
- Characteristic: Fl (2) W 6s.
- Angola no.: PT-5450

Baia de Santa Marta, also known as Baía das Luciras or Espiegle Bay, is a bay in Angola. It is located in the Namibe Province.

== Geography ==
The Baia de Santa Marta is a bay of the Atlantic Ocean located in a small stretch of the Angolan coast where the shore turns sharply east for about 10 km and then north again. The bay is facing northwest and the small town of Lucira is located on its shores. The northern headland is Ponta da Bissonga and the eastern one Ponta Branca.

== See also ==
- List of lighthouses in Angola
- Geography of Angola
