= Bero River =

- Location in Angola

Location
- Country: Angola

Physical characteristics
- Mouth
  - coordinates: 15°10′S 12°10′E

The Bero is a river in southern Angola. Its mouth is at Little Fish Bay in the Atlantic Ocean on the north side of the city of Moçâmedes in Namibe Province.

== History ==
In 1849 Portuguese colonists from Brazil started farms along the river. During a period of conflict with the Ovimbundu in 1862, the Portuguese stationed troops on both banks of the Bero. By the late 19th and early 20th century, the Bero River marshes supported fruit, cotton, sugar and coffee farms, as well as providing fresh water to passing steamships although it was noted that the might be only a foot of water in the river in the dry season. Work to desilt the river and reinforce its banks near the river mouth was done in the 2000s for flood control.

The plant, Euphorbia berotica, was named after the river because it was discovered in the area.

== See also ==
- List of rivers of Angola
