= List of lighthouses in Angola =

This is a list of lighthouses in Angola.

== Lighthouses ==
Name	Image	Year built	Location & coordinates	Class of light	Focal height	NGA number	Admiralty number	Range nml
Ambriz Lighthouse		~1930s	Ambriz; 7°50′10″S 13°06′02″E	Fl (4) W 12s.	33 metres (108 ft)	25568	D5060	16
Baía Farta Lighthouse	Image	1953	Baía Farta; 12°35′49″S 13°12′01″E	Fl G 3s.	11 metres (36 ft)	n/a	D5318	n/a
Benguela Range Front Lighthouse	Image	~1950s	Benguela; 12°34′29″S 13°23′55″E	Iso WRG 2s.	11 metres (36 ft)	25652	D5300	white: 10 red: 8 green: 7
Benguela Range Rear Lighthouse	Image	~1930s	Benguela; 12°34′36″S 13°24′10″E	F R	16 metres (52 ft)	25656	D5300.1	3
Cabeça da Cobra Lighthouse		~1930s	Soyo; 6°32′52″S 12°30′13″E	Fl W 4s.	42 metres (138 ft)	25556	D5003	19
Cabinda Lighthouse		2002	Cabinda; 5°33′01″S 12°10′58″E	Fl (2) W 10s.	27 metres (89 ft)	25504	D4340	20
Cabo Ledo Lighthouse	Image	~1930s	Cabo Ledo; 9°41′11″S 13°11′49″E	Fl (3) W 15s.	102 metres (335 ft)	25604	D5180	17
Cabo de Santa Marta Lighthouse		~1930s	Baía de Santa Marta; 13°52′42″S 12°25′23″E	Fl (2) W 6s.	48 metres (157 ft)	25676	D5346	12
Cabo das Tres Pontas Lighthouse		~1930s	Cabo das Tres Pontas; 10°23′15″S 13°31′54″E	Fl (2) W 7s.	51 metres (167 ft)	25608	D5200	12
Cambiri Lighthouse		n/a	Porto Amboim; 10°43′54″S 13°44′57″E	Fl R 4s.	64 metres (210 ft)	25612	D5226	3
Fortaleza de São Fernando Lighthouse	Image	~1930s	Namibe; 15°11′41″S 12°08′41″E	Oc (2) R 6s.	29 metres (95 ft)	25700	D5418	6
Lobito Lighthouse		1915	Lobito; 12°19′15″S 13°35′44″E	Fl (2) W 10s.	106 metres (348 ft)	25640	D5280	20
Kikombo Lighthouse	Image	2006	Quicombo; 11°21′10″S 13°47′54″E	Fl (4) W 12s.	137 metres (449 ft)	25632	D5250	16
Ilha do Cabo Lighthouse	Image	2002	Luanda; 8°45′38″S 13°15′46″E	Fl (3) W 8s.	11 metres (36 ft)	25584	D5101	9
Malongo Range Front Lighthouse	Image	n/a	Malongo; 5°23′43″S 12°11′52″E	Isp R 2s.	9 metres (30 ft)	25496	D4332	8
Malongo Range Rear Lighthouse	Image	n/a	Malongo; 5°23′34″S 12°12′04″E	Iso R 4s.	121 metres (397 ft)	2500	D4332.1	8
Moita Seca Lighthouse	Image	2002	Soyo; 6°06′46″S 12°16′33″E	Fl (3) W 10s.	20 metres (66 ft)	25528	D4380	12
Namibe Quay Lighthouse		2014	Namibe; 15°11′22″S 12°07′49″E	Fl G 2s.	5 metres (16 ft)	25704	D5420	2
Novo Redondo Lighthouse	Image	~1970	Novo Redondo; 11°11′39″S 13°50′12″E	Fl W 3s.	34 metres (112 ft)	25628	D5240	8
Ponta Albina Lighthouse		2010	Tômbwa; 15°53′08″S 11°44′08″E	Fl (2) W 10s.	35 metres (115 ft)	25720	D5442	21
Ponta do Dande Lighthouse		1968	Barra do Dande; 8°28′09″S 13°20′50″E	Fl (2) W 10s.	63 metres (207 ft)	25572	D5080	16
Ponta dos Frades Lighthouse	Image	1967	Ponta dos Frades; 13°13′01″S 12°42′53″E	Oc (2) W 7.5s.	141 metres (463 ft)	25668	D5328	19
Ponta do Giraúl Lighthouse	Image	2005	Namibe; 15°08′06″S 12°06′46″E	Fl W 5s.	30 metres (98 ft)	25688	D5400	18
Ponta Grossa Lighthouse		~1930s	Ponta Grossa; 14°12′55″S 12°20′08″E	Fl (4) W 12s.	50 metres (160 ft)	25680	D5356	16
Ponta das Lagostas Lighthouse	Image	n/a	Sambizanga; 8°45′27″S 13°18′11″E	Oc (2) R 6s.	81 metres (266 ft)	25576	D5100	7
Ponta de Lândana Lighthouse		1950s	Lândana; 5°14′30″S 12°08′00″E	Oc W 5s.	60 metres (200 ft)	25492	D4326	9
Ponta da Marca Lighthouse		~1930s	Tigres Island; 16°30′59″S 11°42′51″E	Fl (3) W 11s.	15 metres (49 ft)	25724	D5460	18
Ponta do Noronha Lighthouse	Image	2006	Namibe; 15°11′11″S 12°07′32″E	Fl WG 3s.	39 metres (128 ft)	25708	D5414	white: 7 green: 6
Ponta das Palmeirinhas Lighthouse	Image	n/a	Belas; 9°04′13″S 12°59′42″E	Fl W 4.5s.	40 metres (130 ft)	25600	D5150	21
Ponta Piambo Lighthouse	Image	1968	Ponta Piambo; 14°41′56″S 12°16′32″E	Fl (3) W 10s.	54 metres (177 ft)	25684	D5370	17
Ponta do Quinzáu Lighthouse		1967	Ponta do Quinzáu; 6°53′22″S 12°45′27″E	Mo (V) W 12	55 metres (180 ft)	25560	D5006	20
Ponta da Restinga Lighthouse	Image	~1930s	Lobito; 12°18′58″S 13°35′02″E	Fl W 6s.	14 metres (46 ft)	25644	D5288	7
Ponta das Salinas Lighthouse	Image	2006	Municipality of Baía Farta; 12°50′11″S 12°56′35″E	Fl W 4s.	39 metres (128 ft)	25664	D5324	21
Ponta do Sombreiro Lighthouse	Image	n/a	Baía Farta; 12°35′22″S 13°17′41″E	Oc (3) W 9s.	129 metres (423 ft)	25648	D5312	8
Porto Amboim Lighthouse	Image	~1930s	Porto Amboim; 10°45′26″S 13°43′14″E	Oc (2) W 6s.	110 metres (360 ft)	25624	D5224	9
Rio dos Flamingos Lighthouse		1967	Tômbwa; 15°33′51″S 12°01′56″E	Fl (3) W 15s.	110 metres (360 ft)	25712	D5430	26
Simulambuco Range Front Lighthouse		since 1967	Cabinda; 5°33′10″S 12°13′25″E	Iso R 2s.	9 metres (30 ft)	25508	D4343	4
Simulambuco Range Rear Lighthouse		1967	Cabinda; 5°33′16″S 12°13′33″E	Iso R 4s.	46 metres (151 ft)	25512	D4343.1	4
Tômbwa Lighthouse		~1930s	Tômbwa; 15°47′02″S 11°51′03″E	Oc (3) WG 9s.	11 metres (36 ft)	25716	D5436	white: 9 green: 7

== See also ==
- List of lighthouses in the Republic of the Congo (to the north-west)
- List of lighthouses in the Democratic Republic of the Congo
- List of lighthouses in Namibia (to the south)
- Lists of lighthouses and lightvessels
