= List of lighthouses in the Democratic Republic of the Congo =

This is a list of lighthouses in Democratic Republic of the Congo.

== Lighthouses ==
Name	Image	Year built	Location & coordinates	Class of light	Focal height	NGA number	Admiralty number	Range nml
Muanda Lighthouse		1903	5°45′22.3″S 12°20′39.1″E	inactive	13 metres (43 ft)		ARLHS DRC-001	
Pointe Bulabemba Lighthouse		1903 est.	6°03′22.0″S 12°26′35.0″E	Iso WR 6s.	17 metres (56 ft)	25524	D4370	13
Pointe Kipundji Lighthouse		n/a	5°53′27.8″S 12°17′43.8″E	Fl W 5s.	31 metres (102 ft)	25516	D4370	15

== See also ==
- List of lighthouses in the Republic of the Congo (to the north-west)
- List of lighthouses in Angola (to the north and south)
- Lists of lighthouses and lightvessels
