= Tigres Island =

Island in Angola

Native name: Ilha dos Tigres

Geography
- Location: Atlantic Ocean
- Coordinates: 16°36′S 11°41′E
- Area: 98 km^{2} (38 sq mi)
- Length: 20 km (12 mi)
- Width: 6 km (3.7 mi)
- Highest elevation: 30 m (100 ft)

Administration
- Angola
- Province: Namibe Province

Demographics
- Population: uninhabited
- Ponta da Marca Lighthouse
- Constructed: 1930s
- Foundation: on piles
- Construction: masonry tower (current) metal skeletal tower (first)
- Height: 12 m (39 ft)
- Shape: conical tower (current) square pyramidal skeletal tower with balcony, lantern and enclosed observatory room (first)
- Markings: White
- Power source: solar power
- Operator: Instituto Marítimo e Portuário de Angola
- Focal height: 15 m (49 ft)
- Range: 18 nmi (33 km; 21 mi)
- Characteristic: Fl(3) W 11s

Tigres Island (Portuguese: Ilha dos Tigres) is an island in Angola. It is situated in the Namibe Province.

== History ==
It is the largest island of Angola; its area is 98 km^{2}. It once had been a small peninsula in Tigres Strait known as Península dos Tigres with a well established fishing village named Saint Martin of the Tigers (in Portuguese: São Martinho dos Tigres).

The ocean broke through the isthmus of the peninsula on March 14, 1962, and the water line was severed. Tigres became an island overnight with no water supply. Later Tigres and the pump station at the Cunene river mouth were abandoned, and have become ghost towns slowly being reclaimed by the desert.

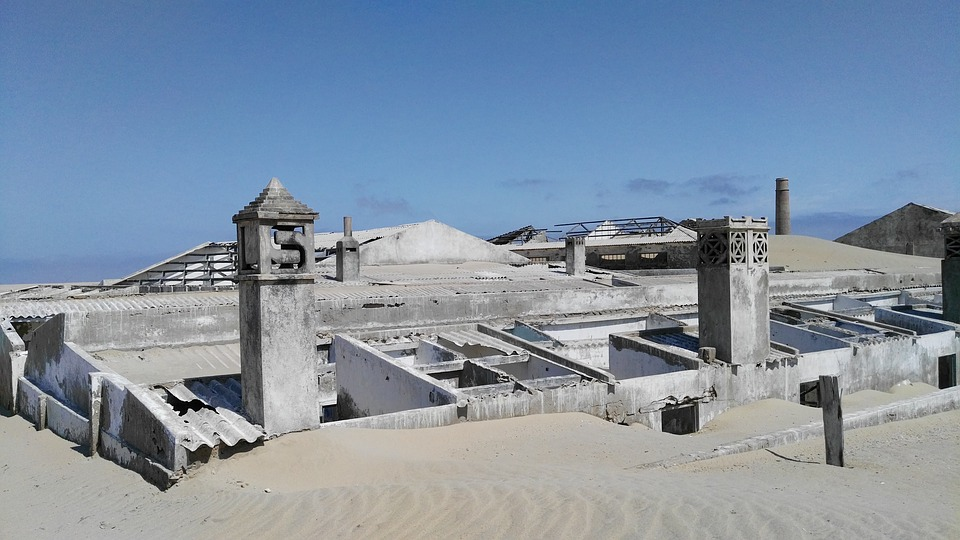
Ruins (2016)

== See also ==
- List of lighthouses in Angola
- List of islands of Angola
- List of ghost towns
