= Baía de Namibe =

Bay in Angola

- Baía de Moçâmedes (Portuguese)
- Location in Angola
- Coordinates: 15°9′S 12°7′E
- River sources: Bero River
- Ocean/sea sources: Atlantic Ocean
- Basin countries: Angola
- Max. length: 8.3 km (5.2 mi)
- Max. width: 4 km (2.5 mi)
- Settlements: Moçâmedes

Baía de Namibe or Little Fish Bay is a bay in Angola. It is located in the Namibe Province.

== Geography ==
The Baía de Namibe is a well-sheltered bay of the Atlantic Ocean. The bay is facing west, with a cove at its northern end known as Baía do Saco. The town of Moçâmedes, capital of Namibe Province, is located at the southern end of the bay. The northern headland is Ponta do Giraul and the southern one Ponta do Noronha. The Bero River has its mouth in the bay.

== See also ==
- Geography of Angola
- Port of Namibe
