= Porto Amboim =

Porto Amboim Kissonde Benguela
- Municipality and town
- Location within Angola
- Coordinates: 10°43′6″S 13°45′0″E
- Country: Angola
- Province: Cuanza Sul
- Elevation: 0 m (0 ft)

Population (2014 Census)
  - Total: 242,444
  - Density: 14/km^{2} (36/sq mi)
- Climate: Aw
- Porto Amboim Lighthouse
- Constructed: 1930s
- Construction: masonry tower
- Height: 12 m (39 ft)
- Shape: quadrangular tower with balcony, external stairs and light
- Markings: White
- Operator: Instituto Marítimo e Portuário de Angola
- Focal height: 110 m (360 ft)
- Range: 9 nmi (17 km; 10 mi)
- Characteristic: Oc(2) W 6s
- Angola no.: PT-5272

Porto Amboim is a port town in Cuanza Sul Province, Angola with a population of 65,000; it comprises an area of 4,638 km^{2}. In the past Porto Amboim was connected by an isolated 123 km 610 mm (2 ft) narrow gauge railway to Gabela, albeit closed in 1987 due to the civil war and to the abandonment of most coffee plantations, the biggest source of revenue from Gabela. Originally Porto Amboim was known as Kissonde, a small village later colonized in 1587 by the Portuguese naming it Benguela and later Benguela Velha (Old Benguela) due to the creation of another village today known as Benguela located 350 km south of Benguela Velha. In 1923, the name was changed to Porto Amboim. Today (2014) Porto Amboim is one of the growing areas for the offshore industry. The pre-salt in front of the coast of Angola, with Porto Amboim in the centre is a planned development area. With companies as Paenal, a joint venture between Sonangol, SBM and DSME and Heerema Porto Amboim, the two major offshore fabrication yards, Porto Amboim is developing.

== Labor market ==
Due to these developments, demand for skilled labor is growing. As a result of the civil war, nowadays the educational system is still on a low development level although the present government puts in a lot of effort to raise the knowledge level of the population. Schools are built even in remote areas.

== See also ==
- List of lighthouses in Angola
