= Cainde =

- commune
- Location in Angola
- Country: Angola
- Province: Namibe
- Time zone: UTC+1 (WAT)

Cainde is a commune of Angola, located in the province of Namibe, Angola, Africa.

The climate in Cainde is hot and semi-arid steppe.

== See also ==
- Communes of Angola
