= Lake Arco =

Lake in Namibe Province, Angola

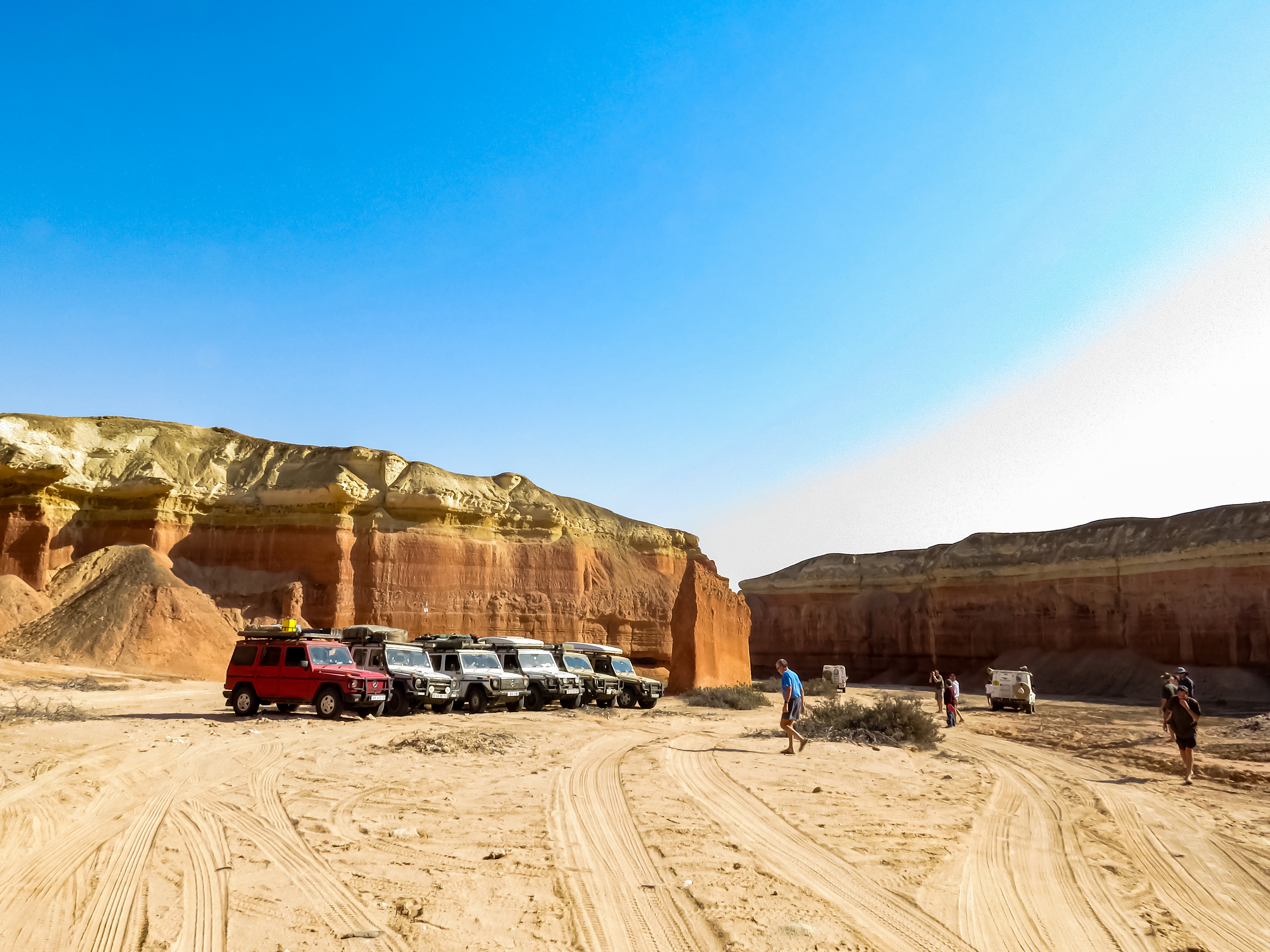
- Off-roading in Lake Arco, 2019

- Location within Angola
- Location: Namibe Province, Angola
- Coordinates: 15°45′57.78″S 12°4′0.26″E

Lake Arco is a freshwater oasis in Namibe Province, Angola. It is named after its two sandstone arches. It is home to many bird species including water birds, raptors, weavers, and others.

The village of Njambasana is located near the lake and the local population has built a parking lot and basic campsite, charging a fee for their services.

The lake dried up due to lack of the 2013-2014 rains in Namibe Province and has remained dry for over a year.
