= São Martinho dos Tigres =

Ghost town in southern Angola

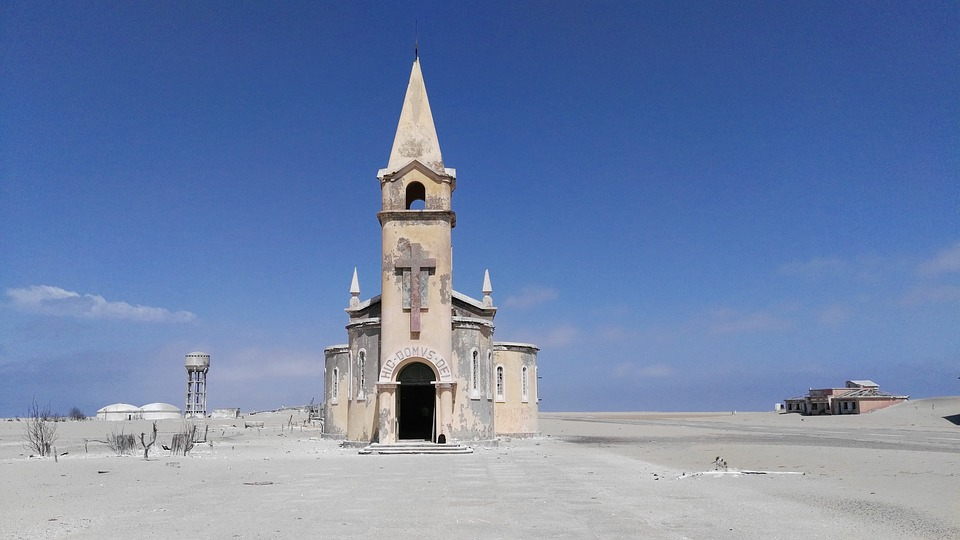
Chapel of Saint Martin of the Tigers, in the center, with the inscription Hic Domvs Dei (this is the house of God); in the background, on the left, the southern water tower.

Saint Martin of the Tigers (Portuguese: São Martinho dos Tigres), sometimes referred to simply as Village of Tigres Bay (Portuguese: Vila da Baía dos Tigres), is a ghost town in southern Angola, located on Tigres Island, currently separated from the Angolan mainland by the Tigres Strait. For legal purposes it is also a commune in the municipality of Tômbua, in the province of Namibe.

== History ==
It was founded in 1860 as a model settlement town to serve as a population and economic center in one of the most inhospitable regions of the Namibe desert. The Portuguese colonial government sent many inhabitants of the Algarve, with great experience in sea fishing, to found the village of Saint Martin of the Tigers, in the still existing Tigres bay.

The village had great infrastructure, having become the largest Angolan fishing center before the first half of the 20th century. However, in 1962, strong waves broke the isthmus of the Tigres peninsula, making it the current Tigres Island. Thereafter Saint Martin of the Tigers faced many difficulties, suffering problems with the supply of water, food and basic items.

Between 1975 and 1976, given that the majority of its population was of European descent and, fearing reprisals from nationalist movements in the ongoing civil war, the village was abandoned, never being populated again for long periods. In the 1980s and 1990s the Angolan government tried to encourage waves of migration to repopulate the village, but was unsuccessful.

Even so, from 1996 onwards, the Angolan government figuratively appointed the communal administrator of Saint Martin of the Tigers, elaborating an ambitious project to recover the locality and the valuable fishing center. The European Union has come to foresee support, but the town's recovery has not yet started. The economic activity that still develops in the area is tourism, thanks to the popular legends that emerged after its transformation into a ghost town.

The locality has a Naval Maneuver Base of the Angolan Navy. However, it is a seasonally inhabited position in the locality.
