= Port of Namibe =

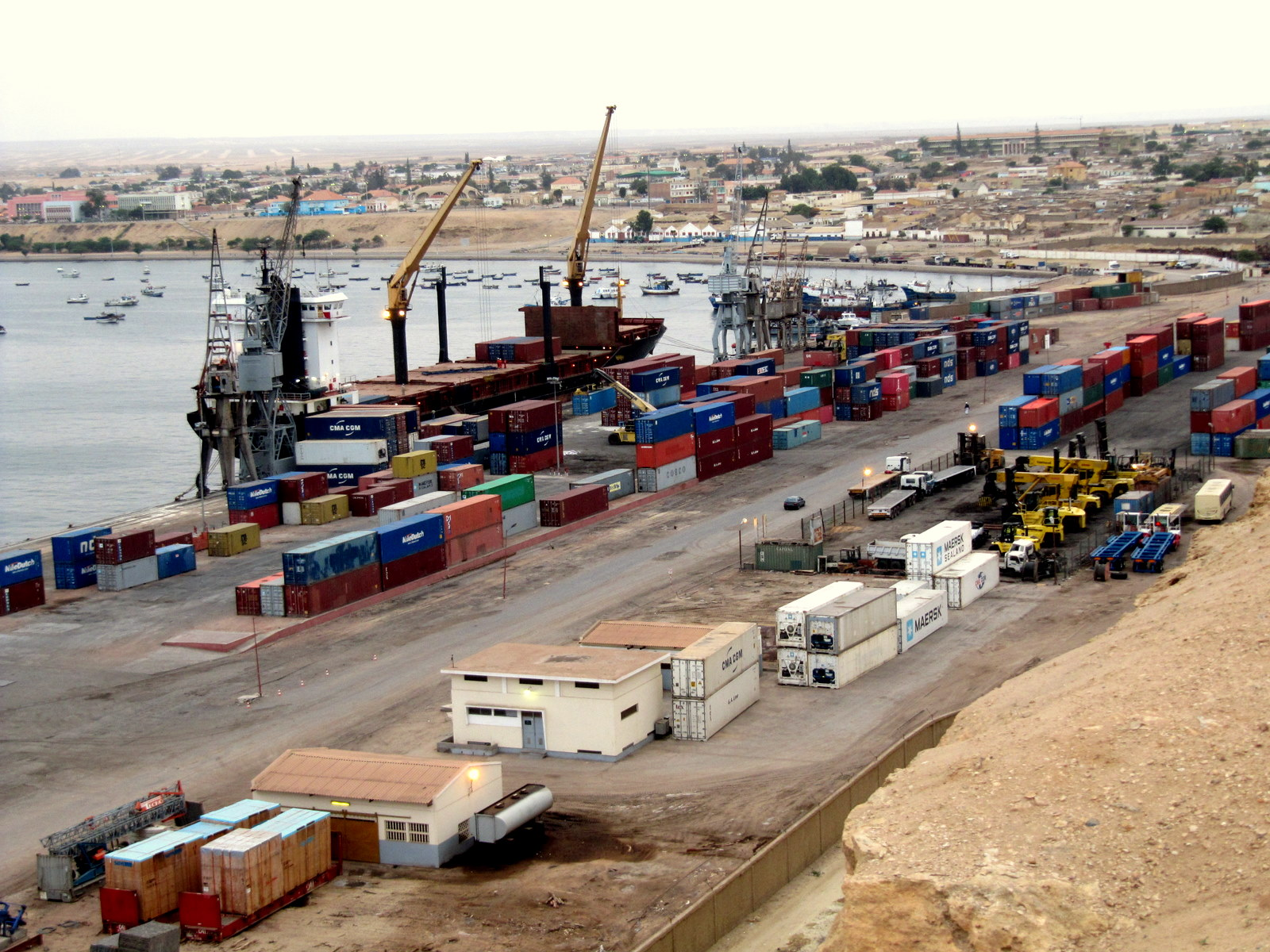
- Interactive map of Port of Namibe

Location
- Country: Angola
- Location: Moçâmedes
- Coordinates: 15°11′S 12°07′E
- UN/LOCODE: AOMSZ

Details
- Opened: 1490; 536 years ago
- Operated by: Empresa Portuária do Namibe
- Type of harbour: Artificial

Statistics
- Website portodonamibe.co.ao

The port of Namibe, or port of Moçâmedes, is an Angolan port located in the city of Moçâmedes, in the province of Namibe. It is built on the banks of the bay of Namibe, a coastal indentation linked to the Atlantic Ocean.

The port belongs to the Angolan government, which is responsible for its administration through the public company Empresa Portuária do Namibe. This company was established to administer the license for terminals for loading and unloading, in addition to the passenger terminal.

Together with the ports of Lobito (Benguela), Luanda (Luanda), Soyo (Zaire) and Cabinda (Cabinda), it forms the largest port complexes in the country. It is the largest port in the south of the country.

The port is the outlet point of the Moçâmedes railway, which carries cargo from the city of Menongue in the Cubango Province. Another important outflow connection is made via the EN-100 highway.

Emerged as a fishing port in the 15th century, it became a port for slave traffic from the 17th century; it was structured and officially opened on 24 May 1957.
