= List of islands of Angola =

This is a list of islands of Angola:

- Bulikoko
- Ilha Cacuanza
- Ilha Cajú
- Ilha da Cazanga
- Ilha Cocavuna
- Ilha Condo
- Dalangombe
- Ilha do Dostero
- Ilha Holongo
- Ilhas Jacinto
- Kwanda Island
- Ilha Liesse
- Ilha de Luanda
- Ilha Macundi
- Ilhas de Monroe
- Ilha do Mussulo
- Ilha Ndalangombe
- Ilha Ngola
- Ilha Ngunza
- Ilhéu dos Pássaros
- Ilha Pendi
- Ilheús do Pina
- Ilha da Quissanga
- Ilha Quixingango
- Ilha Roca
- Ilha de Sacabenda
- Ilha Sacra Mbaca
- Ilha Sanga
- Ilha Selonga
- Ilha do Sumbo
- Ilha Tchicuanza
- Ilha dos Tigres
- Ilha Zaida
