= Barra do Dande =

- commune and town
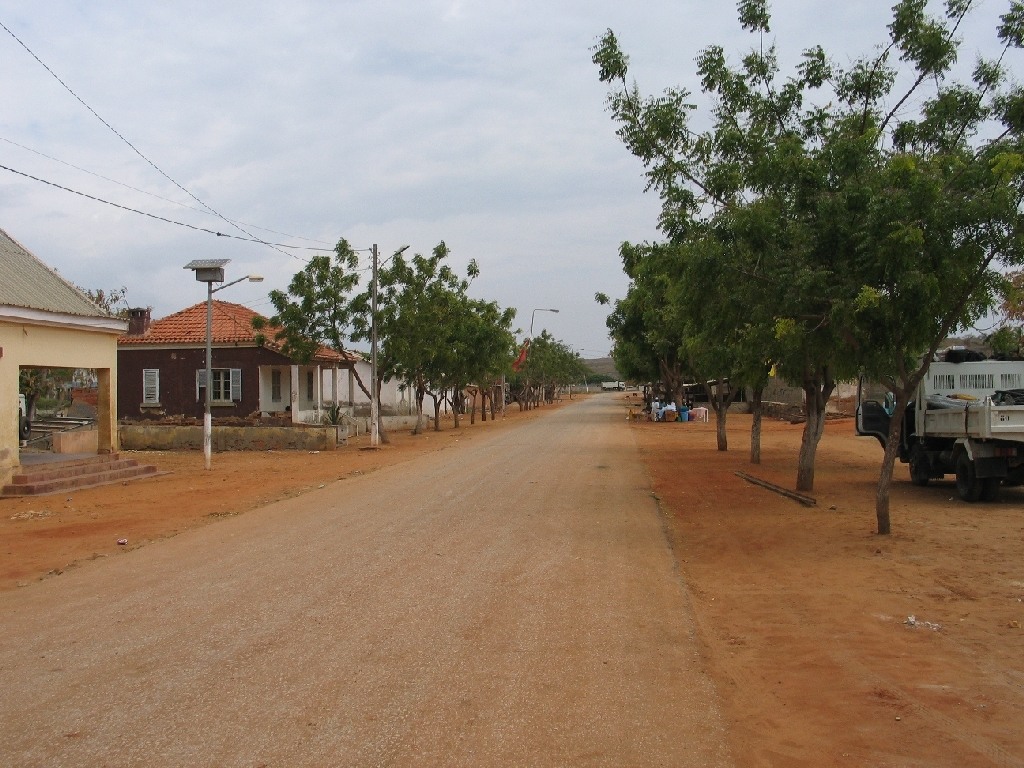
- Road through Barra do Dande

- Location in Angola
- Coordinates: 8°28′22″S 13°22′23″E
- Country: Angola
- Province: Bengo
- Municipality: Dande

Area
  - Total: 520 sq mi (1,350 km^{2})

Population (2014)
  - Total: 95,989
  - Density: 184/sq mi (71.1/km^{2})
- Time zone: UTC+1 (WAT)
- Climate: BSh
- Ponta do Dande Lighthouse
- Constructed: 1968
- Construction: masonry tower
- Height: 20 metres (66 ft)
- Shape: quadrangular tower with balcony and lantern
- Markings: white and red horizontal band tower
- Operator: Instituto Marítimo e Portuário de Angola
- Focal height: 63 metres (207 ft)
- Range: 16 nautical miles (30 km; 18 mi)
- Characteristic: Fl (3) W 10s.
- Angola no.: PT-5193

Barra do Dande is a town, with a population of 75,000 (2014), and a commune in the municipality of Dande, province of Bengo, Angola.

It is located at the mouth of the Dande River.

The government plans to build a deep-water port at Barra do Dande. This new port is about 30 km north of Luanda.

== See also ==
- List of lighthouses in Angola
