= Diaz Point Lighthouse =

Lighthouse in Namibia

Coordinates: 26°38′11″S 15°05′35″E

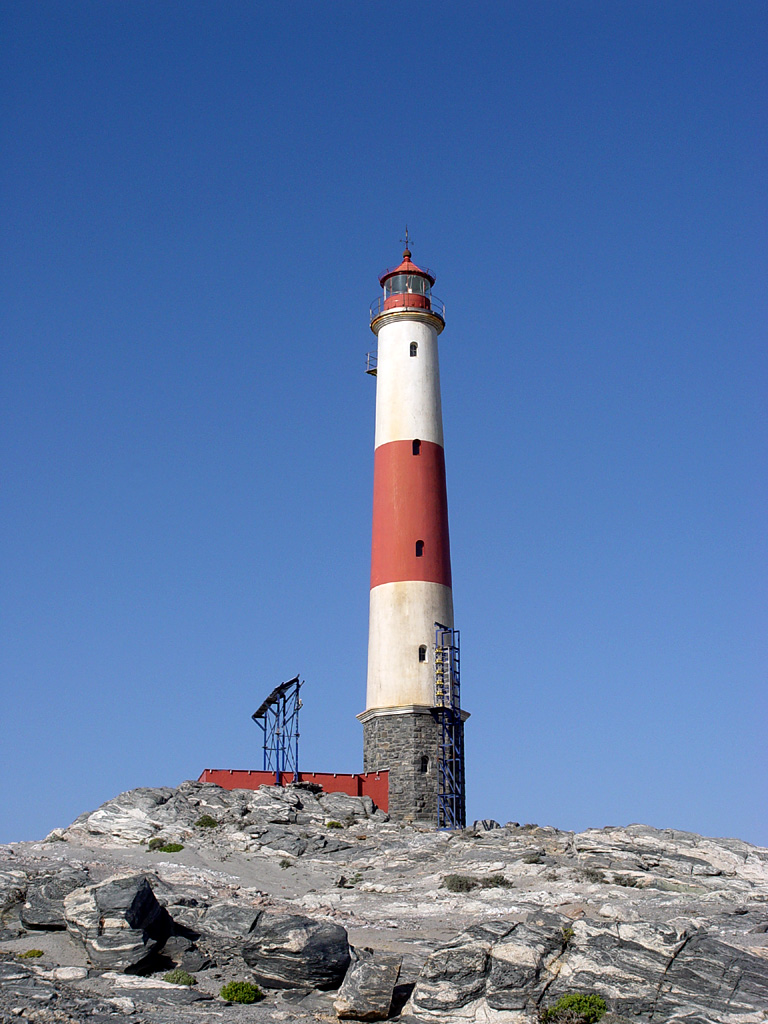
Diaz Point Lighthouse

The Diaz Point Lighthouse is a lighthouse on the Atlantic Ocean, located at Diaz Point near Lüderitz, Namibia.

The lighthouse opened in 1915. It is 28 m high with a lantern and gallery set on a one-story-high hexagonal stone base. The tower is painted in red and white bands. The foghorn is 450 m north of the lighthouse.
