= List of lighthouses in the Republic of the Congo =

This is a list of lighthouses in Republic of the Congo.

== Lighthouses ==
Name	Image	Year built	Location & coordinates	Class of light	Focal height	NGA number	Admiralty number	Range nml
Djeno Lighthouse		n/a	4°55′23.6″S 11°56′02.3″E	Oc WR 4s.	29 metres (95 ft)	25484	D4319	white: 18 red: 15
Pointe-Noire Lightouse		1927	4°47′34.2″S 11°50′14.1″E	Fl W 5s.	27 metres (89 ft)	25452	D4311	24
Pointe-Noire Entrée Lighthouse (Cathedral)		1953	4°47′50.8″S 11°50′45.8″E	F R	40 metres (130 ft)	25464	D4315.1	9

== See also ==
- List of lighthouses in Gabon (to the north-west)
- List of lighthouses in Angola (to the south)
- Lists of lighthouses and lightvessels
