= Port of Lobito =

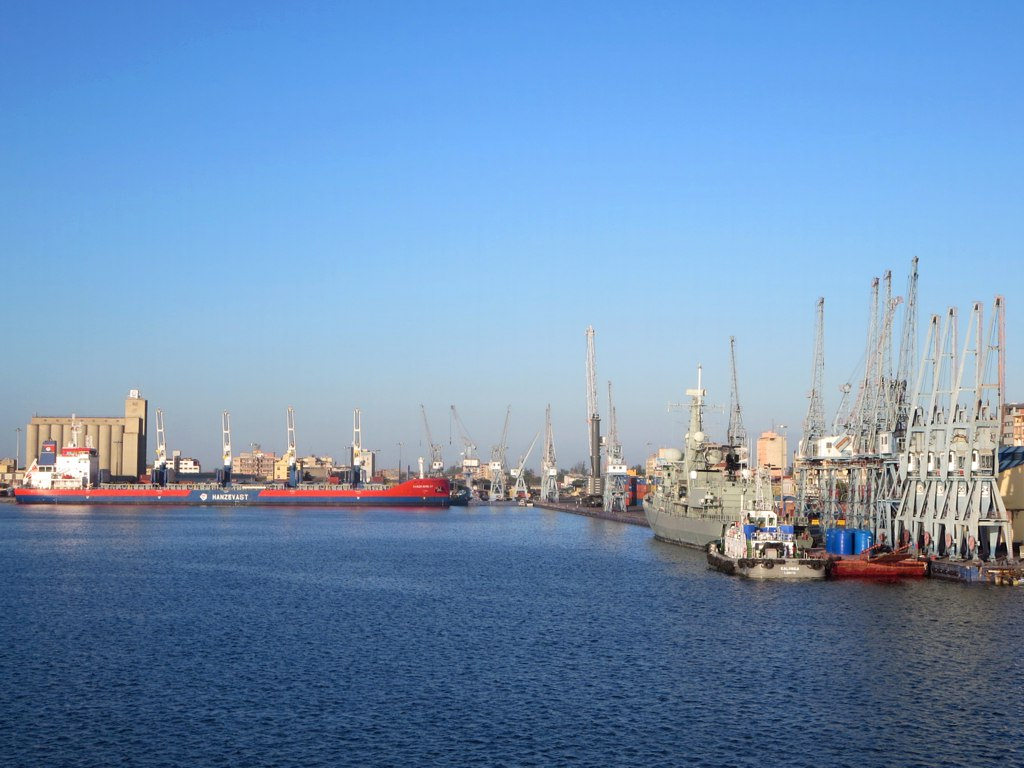
- Interactive map of Port of Lobito

Location
- Country: Angola
- Location: Lobito
- Coordinates: 12°20′42″S 13°32′51″E
- UN/LOCODE: AOLOB

Details
- Opened: 1 March 1903; 123 years ago
- Operated by: Empresa Portuaria do Lobito
- Owned by: Public company
- Type of harbour: Artificial
- Size of harbour: 14m - 15.2m anchorage depth
- Chairman: Celso Rosas

Statistics
- Annual cargo tonnage: 2 million tonnes annually
- Website portodolobito.co.ao

The Port of Lobito is an Angolan port located in the city of Lobito, in the province of Benguela. It is connected to the commercial area of the city and the neighborhood of Canata. It is located in Lobito Bay, which is separated from the Atlantic Ocean by the Lobito Peninsula.

The port belongs to the Angolan government, which is responsible for its administration through the public company Porto do Lobito E.P.. This company was established to administer the license for terminals for loading and unloading, in addition to the passenger terminal.

Together with the ports of Luanda (Luanda), Moçamedes (Namibe), Soyo (Zaire) and Cabinda (Cabinda), it forms the largest port complexes in the country. It is the largest port in the center of the country.

The port is the outlet point of the Benguela railway, which carries cargo from the city of Tenke in the Democratic Republic of Congo. In 2024, it also became a mineral terminal port for the Lobito Atlantic Railway (LAR). In August 2024 the first trainload of copper from the Democratic Republic of the Congo bound for the United States was shipped through the port, underscoring its emerging role as an Atlantic export gateway for copper and cobalt from the Central African Copperbelt under the United States– and European Union–backed Lobito Corridor initiative. The EN-100 highway is an important outflow connection to port traffic.
