= Kapagombe =

- commune
- Country: Angola
- Province: Namibe
- Time zone: UTC+1 (WAT)

Kapagombe is a commune of Angola, located in the province of Namibe.

== See also ==
- Communes of Angola
