= Lola, Namibe =

Coordinates: 14°18′S 13°37′E

Lola
- commune
- Location in Angola
- Country: Angola
- Province: Namibe
- Time zone: UTC+1 (WAT)

Lola is a commune of Angola, located in the province of Namibe.

== See also ==
- Communes of Angola
