= Tômbua =

Tômbua Porto Alexandre
- Municipality
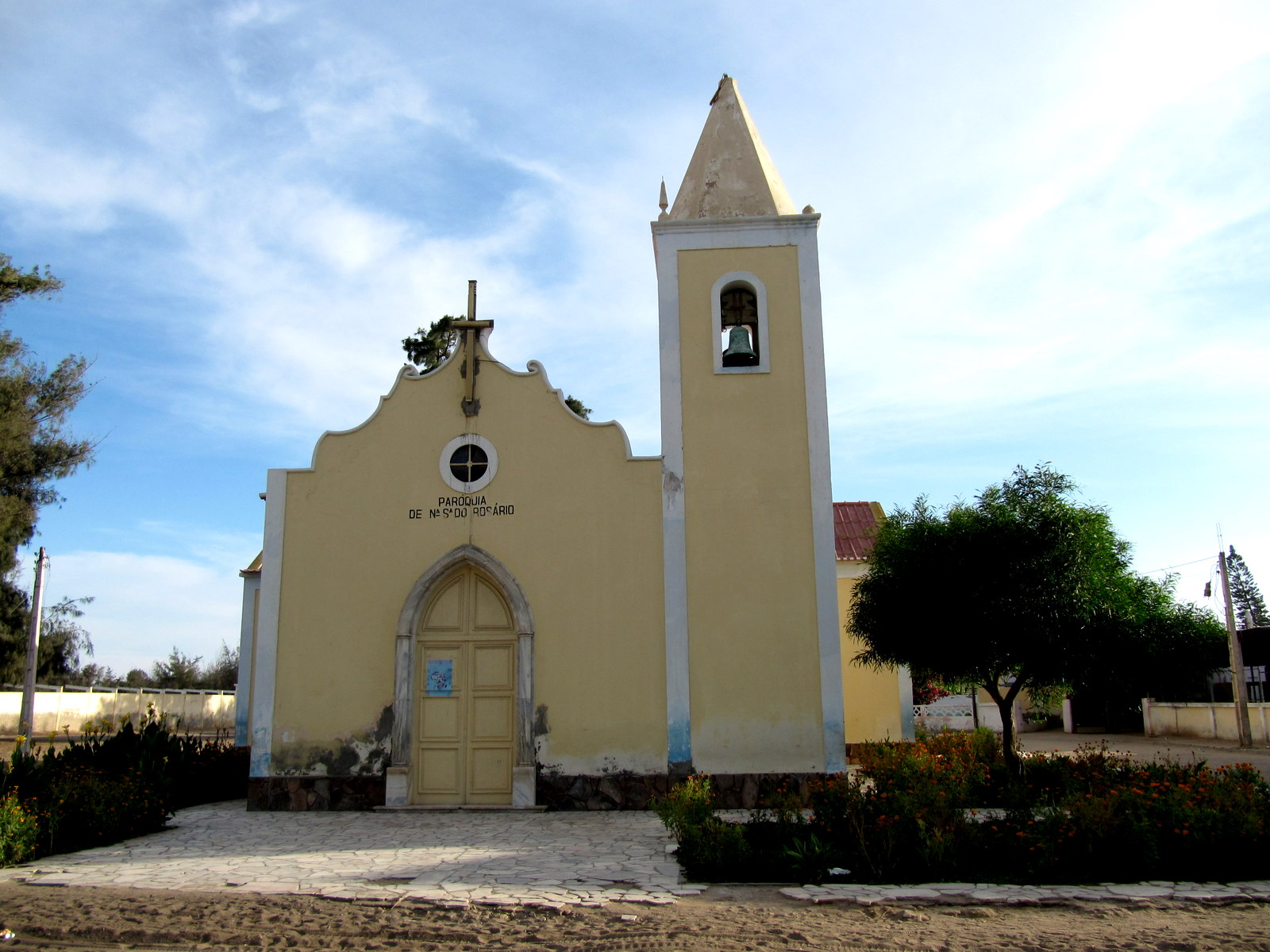

- Location in Angola
- Coordinates: 15°48′S 11°51′E
- Country: Angola
- Province: Namibe

Population (2014 Census)
  - Total: 55,494
- Time zone: UTC+1 (WAT)
- Climate: BWh

Tômbua (also spelled Tômbwa), formerly known as Porto Alexandre, is a city and municipality in Angola, in Namibe Province. The municipality has a population of 55,494 and the city has a population of 46,573 in 2014. It is located on the shore of Porto Alexandre, an important harbor on the South Atlantic Ocean for oil production and fishing.

The villages of Yona and Saint Martin of the Tigers are part of the municipality of Tômbua.

== Economy ==
The port had refrigeration facilities installed with European Union assistance at the Tombwe canning factory.

It was during Portuguese Angola the largest fishing port of Angola and one of the largest in West Africa. It was established by fishermen from Olhão, Algarve around 1863 in a sheltered bay, and joined by the fishermen of Póvoa de Varzim in 1921, who left Brazil not wishing to lose Portuguese nationality by becoming Brazilian nationals. Due to the fishing industry, Porto Alexandre gained city status in 1961.

As of 2019 fishing harvests are declining. This is believed to have resulted from ocean warming, harvesting by industrial-sized foreign ships, and oxygen depletion. The movement of Angolans to the area based on its reputation for plentiful fishing has also contributed to the shortage of fish near the shore. As a result, anglers, usually from South Africa, who used to travel there for the fine fishing, no longer come. The prime fishing area, characterized by upwelling nutrient-rich cold water, has moved south along the Namibian coast.

== See also ==
- Tômbwa Lighthouse
