= Shark Island Lighthouse =

Lighthouse in Namibia

Coordinates: 26°38′08″S 15°09′09″E

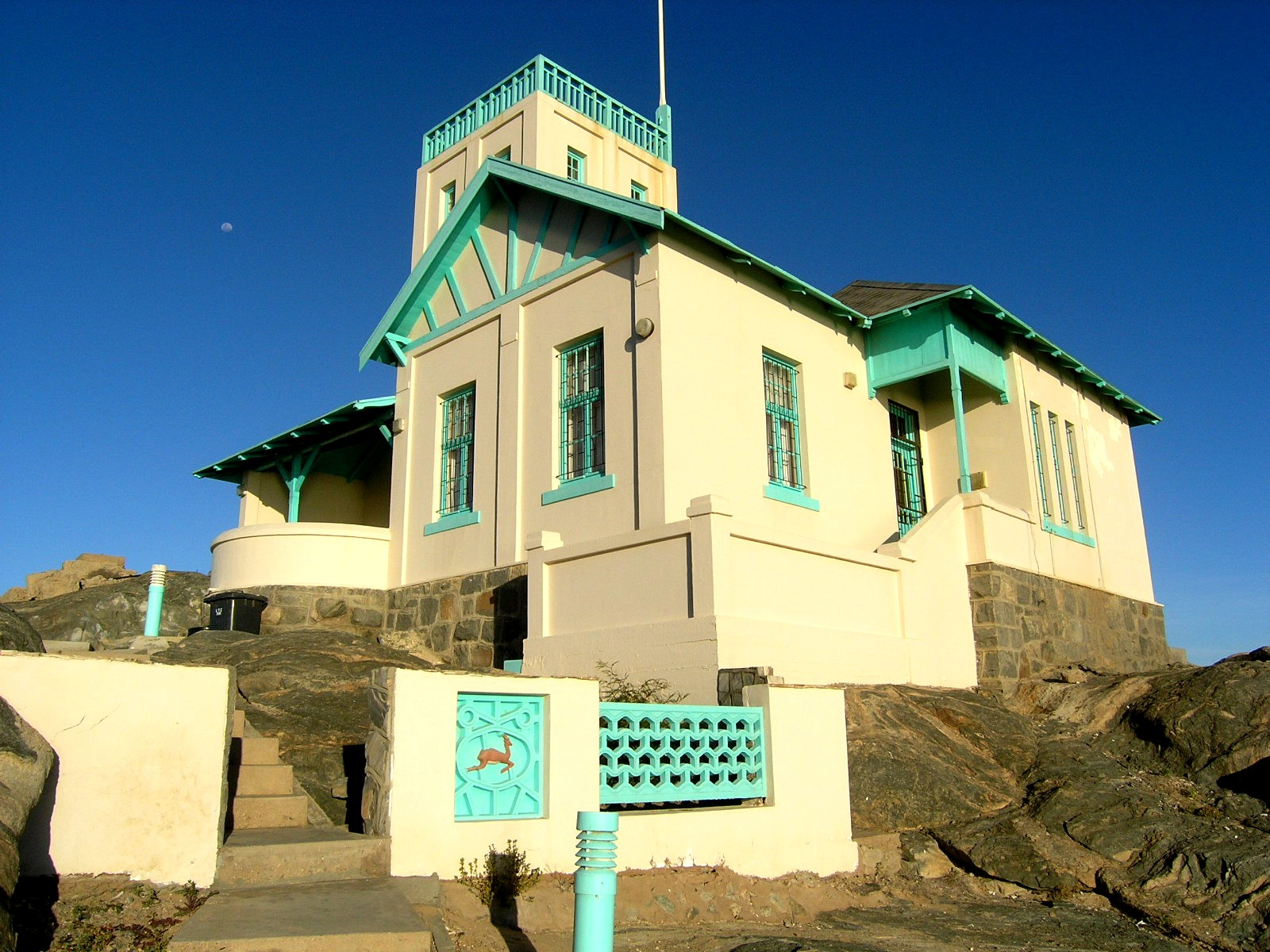
Shark Island Lighthouse

The Shark Island Lighthouse is a lighthouse in the port of Lüderitz, Namibia. Built in 1903 and inactive since 1910, it was replaced by a modern directional light standing on a skeletal steel pole. The 12-meter-high lighthouse is cylindrical, flanked by a gallery, and painted white with red detailing. The lantern has been removed and the original tower's rooms can be rented for overnight stays as part of a holiday resort.
