= Baía Farta =

- Municipality and town
- Location in Angola
- Coordinates: 12°36′26″S 13°11′40″E
- Country: Angola
- Province: Benguela Province

Area
  - Municipality and town: 6,866 km^{2} (2,651 sq mi)

Population (2014 Census)
  - Municipality and town: 107,841
  - Density: 15.71/km^{2} (40.68/sq mi)
  - Urban: 45,000
- Time zone: UTC+1 (WAT)
- Climate: BWh
- Baía Farta Lighthouse; Ponta de São José
- Constructed: 1953
- Construction: concrete tower
- Height: 10 m (33 ft)
- Shape: quadrangular tower with light atop a service building
- Markings: white and red horizontal band
- Operator: Instituto Marítimo e Portuário de Angola
- Focal height: 11 m (36 ft)
- Characteristic: Fl G 3s

Baía Farta is a town and municipality in Benguela Province in Angola. The municipality had a population of 107,841 in 2014.

== See also ==
- List of lighthouses in Angola
