= Lucira =

Coordinates: 13°52′S 12°32′E

- commune
- Location in Angola
- Country: Angola
- Province: Namibe
- Time zone: UTC+1 (WAT)

Lucira is a commune of Angola, located in the province of Namibe.

== See also ==
- Communes of Angola
