= Pelican Point Lighthouse =

Coordinates: 22°53′31″S 14°26′07″E

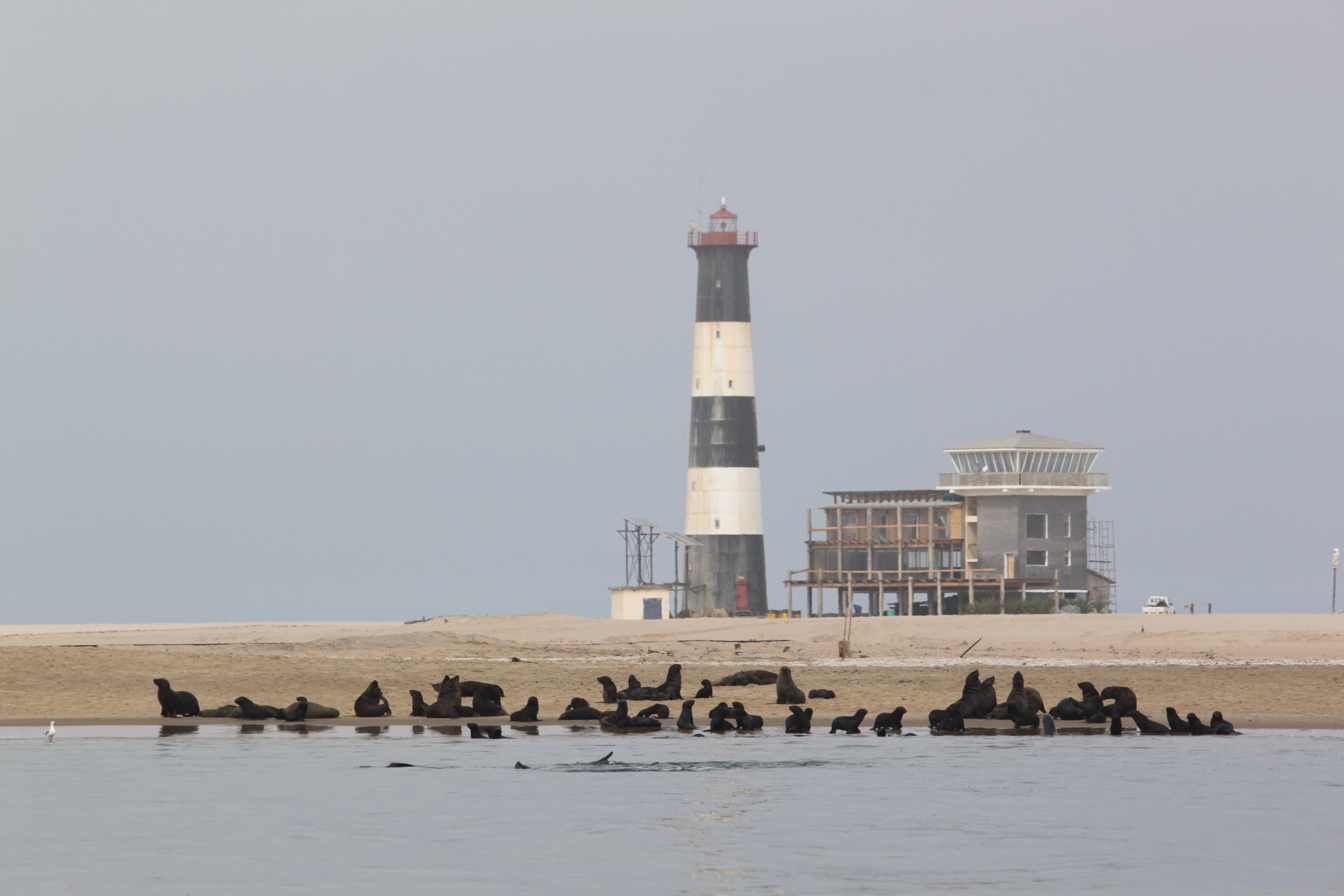
Pelican Point Lighthouse

The Pelican Point Lighthouse is a lighthouse overlooking the Atlantic Ocean from the Pelican Point peninsula, a long sandbar guarding Walvis Bay, Namibia. It was inaugurated by the South African government in 1932. The round, cast-iron, 34-meter-high tower features a lantern and gallery and is painted in horizontal black and white bands.
