= Virei =

- Municipality & Town
- Location in Angola
- Coordinates: 15°43′S 12°57′E
- Country: Angola
- Province: Namibe

Area
  - Total: 15,092 km^{2} (5,827 sq mi)

Population (2014 Census)
  - Total: 32,445
  - Density: 0.6/km^{2} (1.6/sq mi)
- Time zone: UTC+1 (WAT)
- Climate: BWh

Virei is a town and municipality of Namibe Province, Angola. It has an area of 15,092 km^{2}. The municipality had a population of 32,445 in 2014.
