= Moçâmedes =

- Municipality
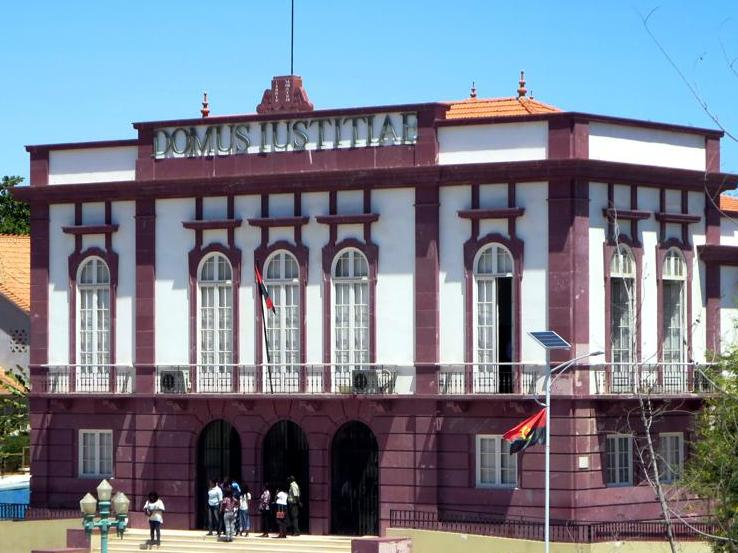
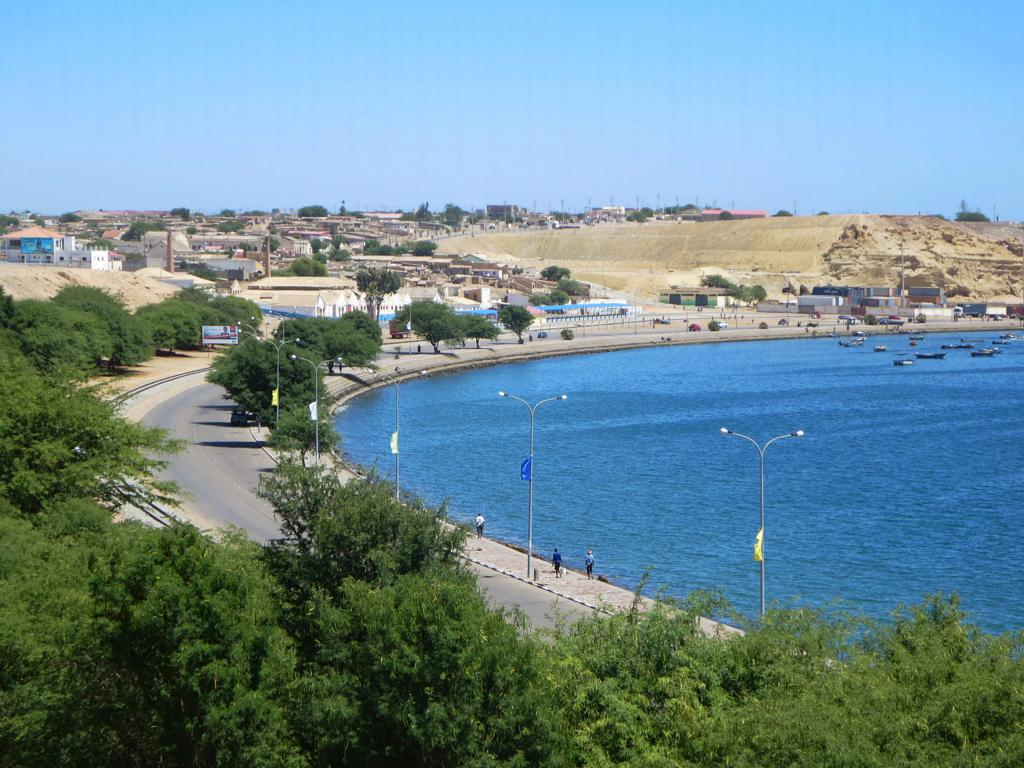
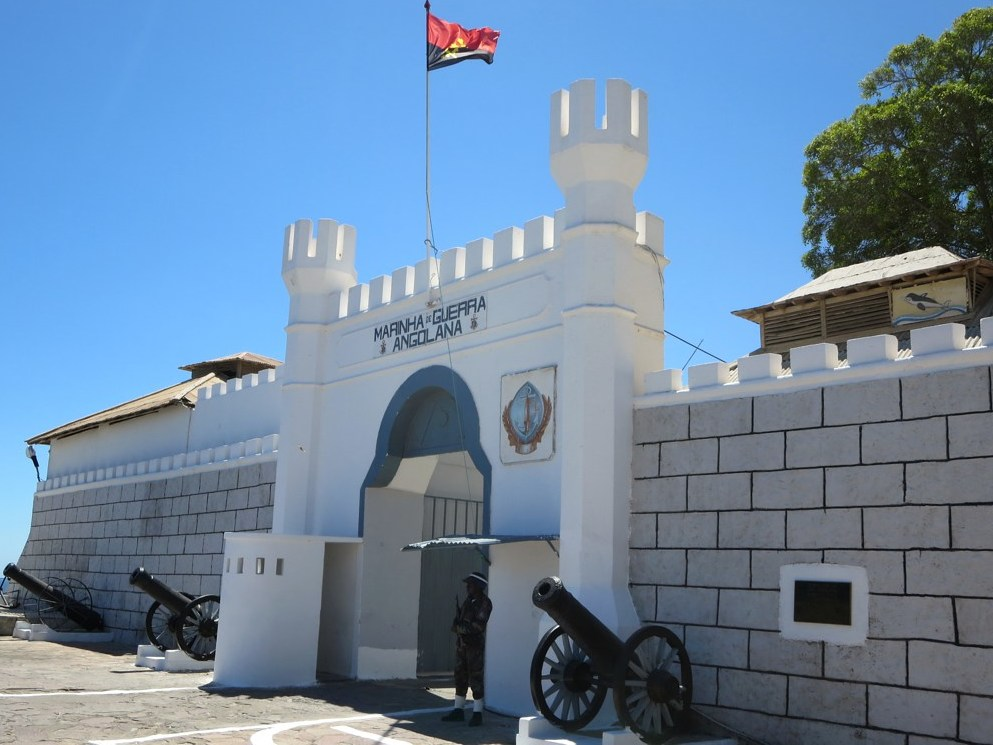
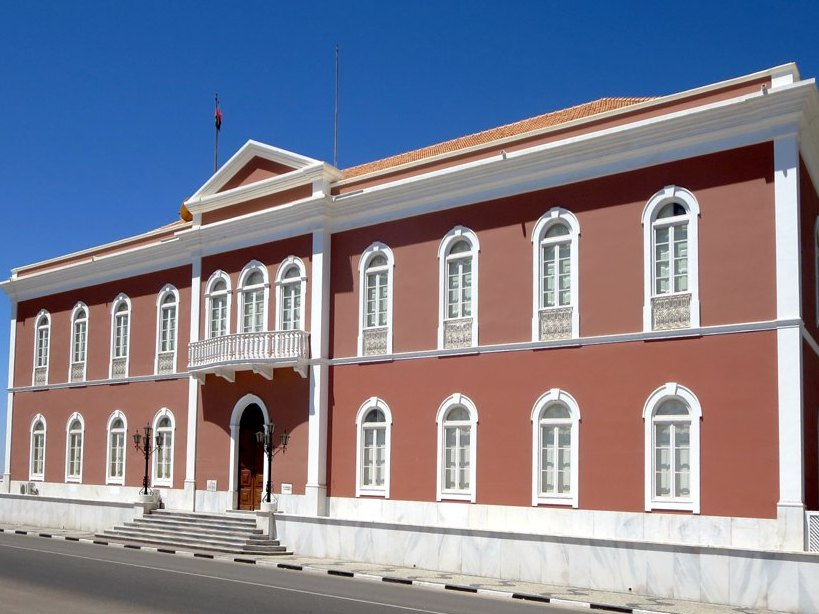

- Location in Angola
- Coordinates: 15°11′43″S 12°9′3″E
- Country: Angola
- Province: Namibe Province
- Founded: 1840

Area
  - Total: 1,906 km^{2} (736 sq mi)
- Elevation: 9 m (30 ft)

Population (2024 census)
  - Total: 345,987
  - Density: 181.5/km^{2} (470.1/sq mi)
- Time zone: UTC+1 (WAT)
- Climate: BWh

Moçâmedes is a city in southwestern Angola, and the capital of Namibe Province. The city's current population is 345,987 (2024 census). Founded in 1840 by the Portuguese colonial administration, the city was named Namibe between 1985 and 2016. Moçâmedes has a cool dry climate and desert vegetation, because it is near the Namib Desert.

== History ==
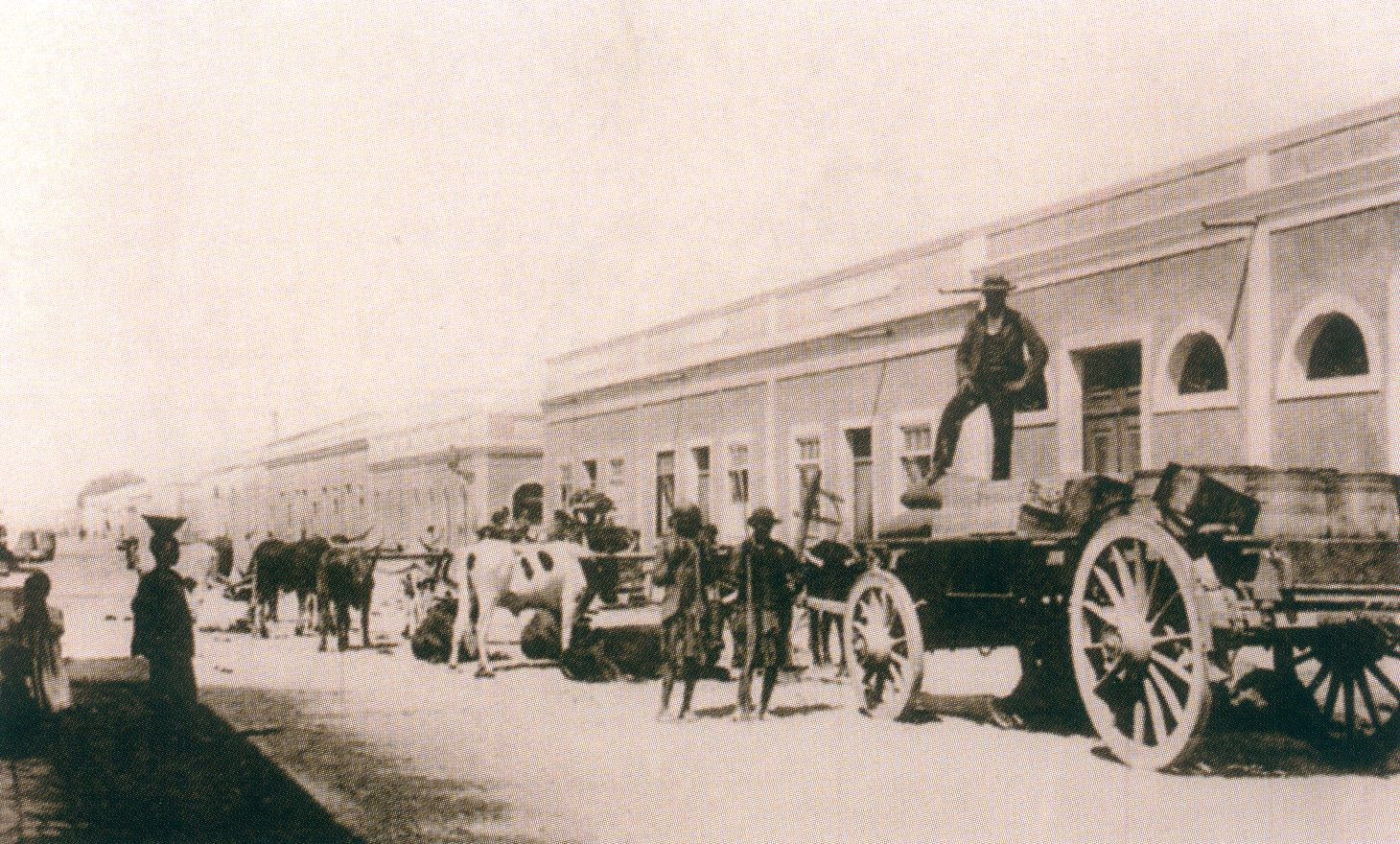
Moçâmedes in 1908.

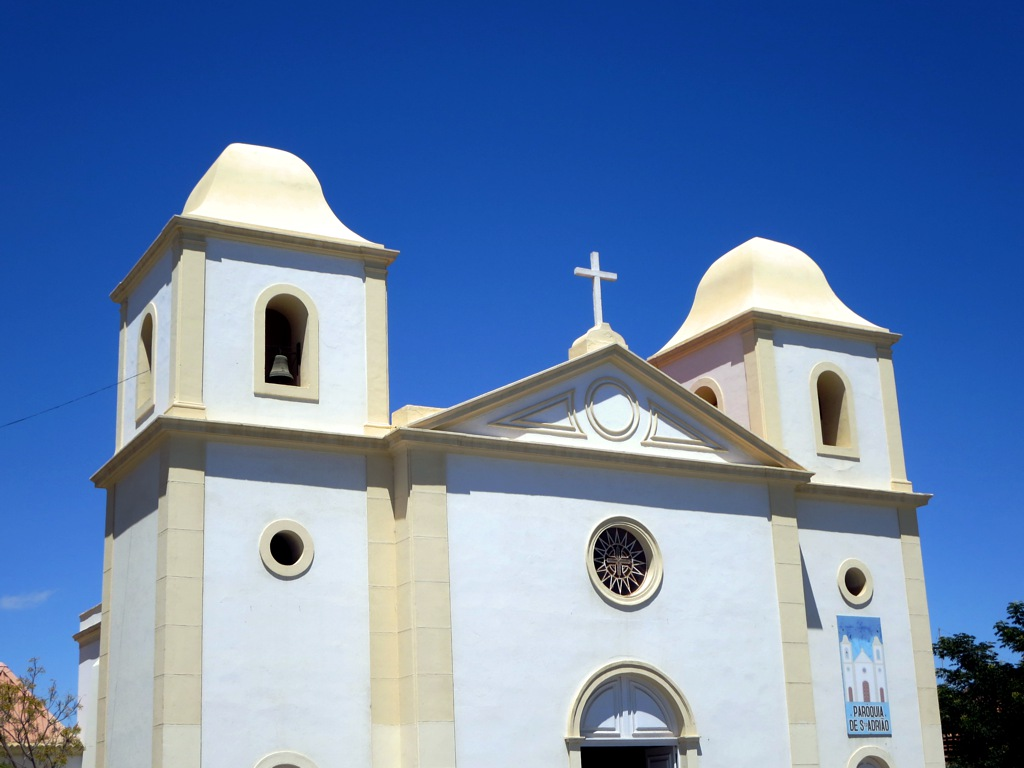
Portuguese colonial architecture in the historic centre of Moçâmedes.

The area was first explored by the Portuguese in 1785 and claimed for Portugal by Luís Cândido Cordeiro Pinheiro Furtado, who had been sent there in the frigate Loanda by the then governor-general of Angola, Baron Moçâmedes (Portuguese: Barão de Mossâmedes), who also sent an overland expedition headed by Gregório José Mendes to rendezvous with Furtado. They renamed the bay Moçâmedes in honour of the baron.

In 1839 the then governor-general of Angola, Admiral Noronha, sent a fresh expedition to subdue the local chiefs and make them vassals of Portugal.

Moçâmedes was officially founded in 1840 by the Portuguese colonial administration on a bay that the Portuguese originally called Angra do Negro by order of Portuguese prime minister, the Count of Bonfim, who was also head of the Colonial Department.

In 1840 a factory was established and in July of the same year a fort was built at Ponta Negra. The area was colonized mainly by Portuguese settlers from Madeira and Brazil; in the 1850s the Portuguese government also gave sea passage and financial assistance to a large number of German colonists.

The village grew as a fishing port and by the 1960s it had 143 fishing boats and several fish processing factories. The port soon ranked alongside other important fishing ports such as Luanda, Benguela and Lobito.

About 200 km from the city of Moçâmedes the Portuguese authorities founded the Iona National Park, Angola's oldest and largest national park, proclaimed as a reserve in 1937 and upgraded to a national park covering 15,150 km^{2} in 1964.

== Climate ==
Moçâmedes has a hot desert climate (Köppen climate classification BWh). Despite being well north of the Tropic of Capricorn on the Atlantic Coast, the climate is subtropical due to the cooling effect of the northward-flowing Benguela Current causing July and August to be below 18 °C.

Climate data for Namibe
Month	Jan	Feb	Mar	Apr	May	Jun	Jul	Aug	Sep	Oct	Nov	Dec	Year
Record high °C (°F)	34.8 (94.6)	34.2 (93.6)	37.4 (99.3)	38.9 (102.0)	40.3 (104.5)	38.5 (101.3)	36.7 (98.1)	27.3 (81.1)	30.0 (86.0)	30.0 (86.0)	33.7 (92.7)	31.7 (89.1)	40.3 (104.5)
Mean daily maximum °C (°F)	27.0 (80.6)	28.0 (82.4)	28.9 (84.0)	27.9 (82.2)	25.8 (78.4)	22.4 (72.3)	20.6 (69.1)	20.9 (69.6)	22.4 (72.3)	23.6 (74.5)	25.3 (77.5)	25.9 (78.6)	24.9 (76.8)
Daily mean °C (°F)	23.0 (73.4)	24.7 (76.5)	25.6 (78.1)	24.2 (75.6)	21.1 (70.0)	18.3 (64.9)	17.4 (63.3)	17.9 (64.2)	19.2 (66.6)	20.4 (68.7)	21.9 (71.4)	22.5 (72.5)	21.4 (70.5)
Mean daily minimum °C (°F)	19.1 (66.4)	19.8 (67.6)	20.7 (69.3)	18.7 (65.7)	14.7 (58.5)	12.8 (55.0)	13.0 (55.4)	13.8 (56.8)	14.9 (58.8)	15.9 (60.6)	17.1 (62.8)	17.7 (63.9)	16.5 (61.7)
Record low °C (°F)	13.0 (55.4)	12.1 (53.8)	12.6 (54.7)	10.2 (50.4)	7.4 (45.3)	4.5 (40.1)	6.5 (43.7)	5.2 (41.4)	7.2 (45.0)	8.2 (46.8)	10.5 (50.9)	11.2 (52.2)	4.5 (40.1)
Average precipitation mm (inches)	7.2 (0.28)	10.0 (0.39)	17.1 (0.67)	9.7 (0.38)	0.1 (0.00)	0.1 (0.00)	0.2 (0.01)	0.2 (0.01)	0.3 (0.01)	1.1 (0.04)	2.1 (0.08)	2.9 (0.11)	51.0 (2.01)
Average precipitation days (≥ 0.1 mm)	2	2	3	2	0	0	0	1	0	1	1	1	13
Average relative humidity (%)	80	79	78	79	82	84	84	85	84	83	80	79	81
Mean monthly sunshine hours	210.8	209.1	232.5	231.0	217.0	141.0	105.4	111.6	129.0	155.0	213.0	220.1	2,175.5
Mean daily sunshine hours	6.8	7.4	7.5	7.7	7.0	4.7	3.4	3.6	4.3	5.0	7.1	7.1	6.0
Source: Deutscher Wetterdienst

== Economy ==
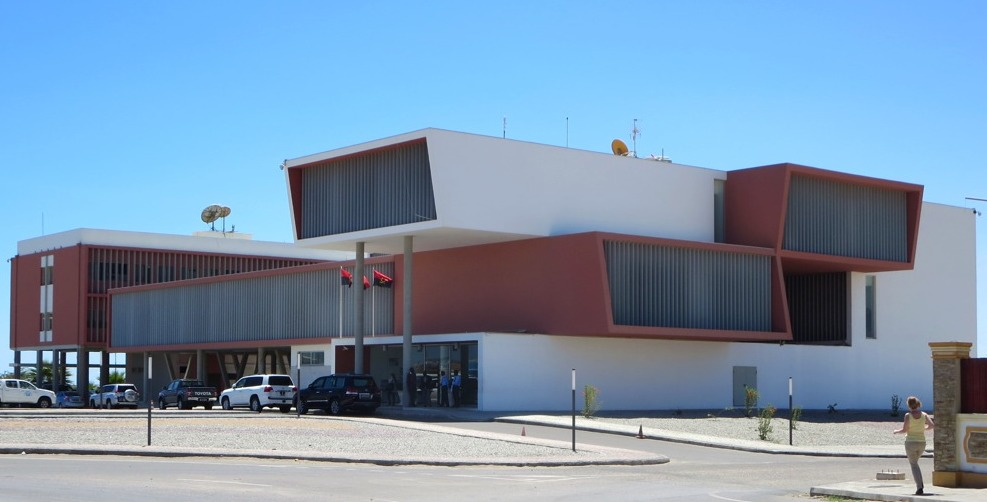
Provincial Government of Namibe.

During 1966-67 a major iron ore terminal was built at Saco, the bay 12 km north of Moçâmedes, to serve the iron ore mine inland at Cassinga. Construction of the mine installations and a 300 km railway were commissioned to Krupp of Germany and the modern harbour terminal to SETH, a Portuguese company owned by Højgaard & Schultz of Denmark.

Within one year the first 250,000 ton ore carrier docked and loaded with ore in 1967.

== Culture ==
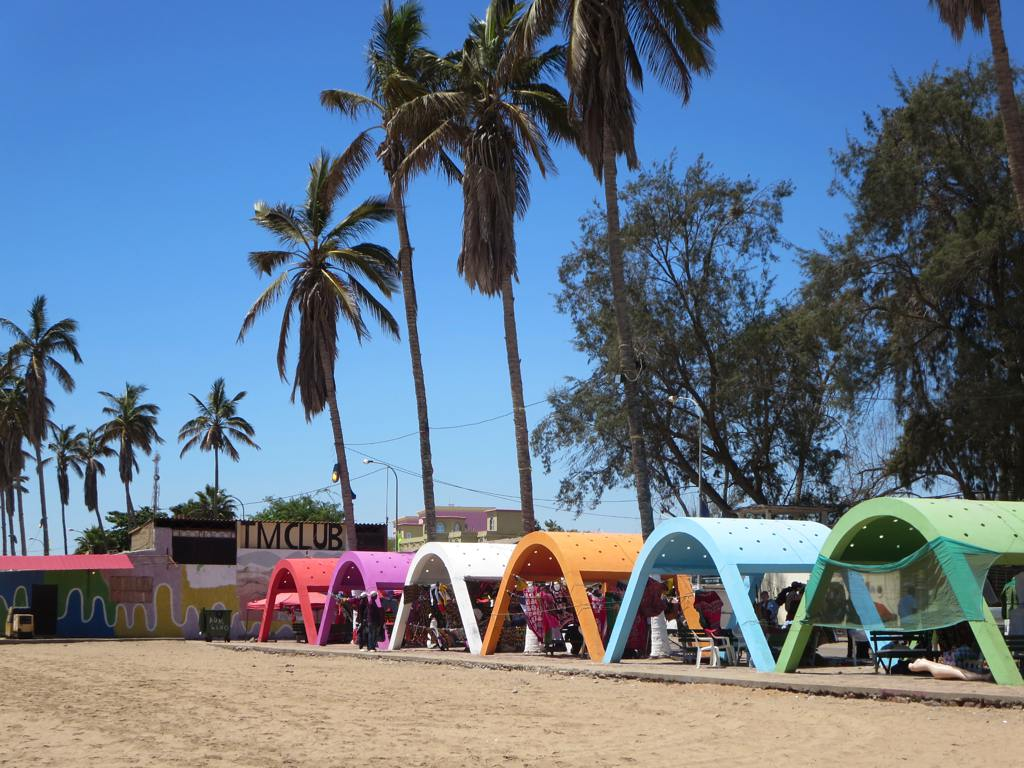
Tourism is an increasingly important industry in Moçâmedes.

=== Religion ===
The city's Sé Catedral de São Pedro is the cathedral episcopal see of the Roman Catholic Diocese of Namibe, which was established in 2009 on territory split from its Metropolitan's Roman Catholic Archdiocese of Lubango, to which it is a suffragan diocese.

=== Sports ===
In 2013, Moçâmedes, then called Namibe, and the national capital Luanda jointly hosted the 2013 FIRS Men's Roller Hockey World Cup, the first time that a World Cup of roller hockey was held in Africa.

== Transport ==
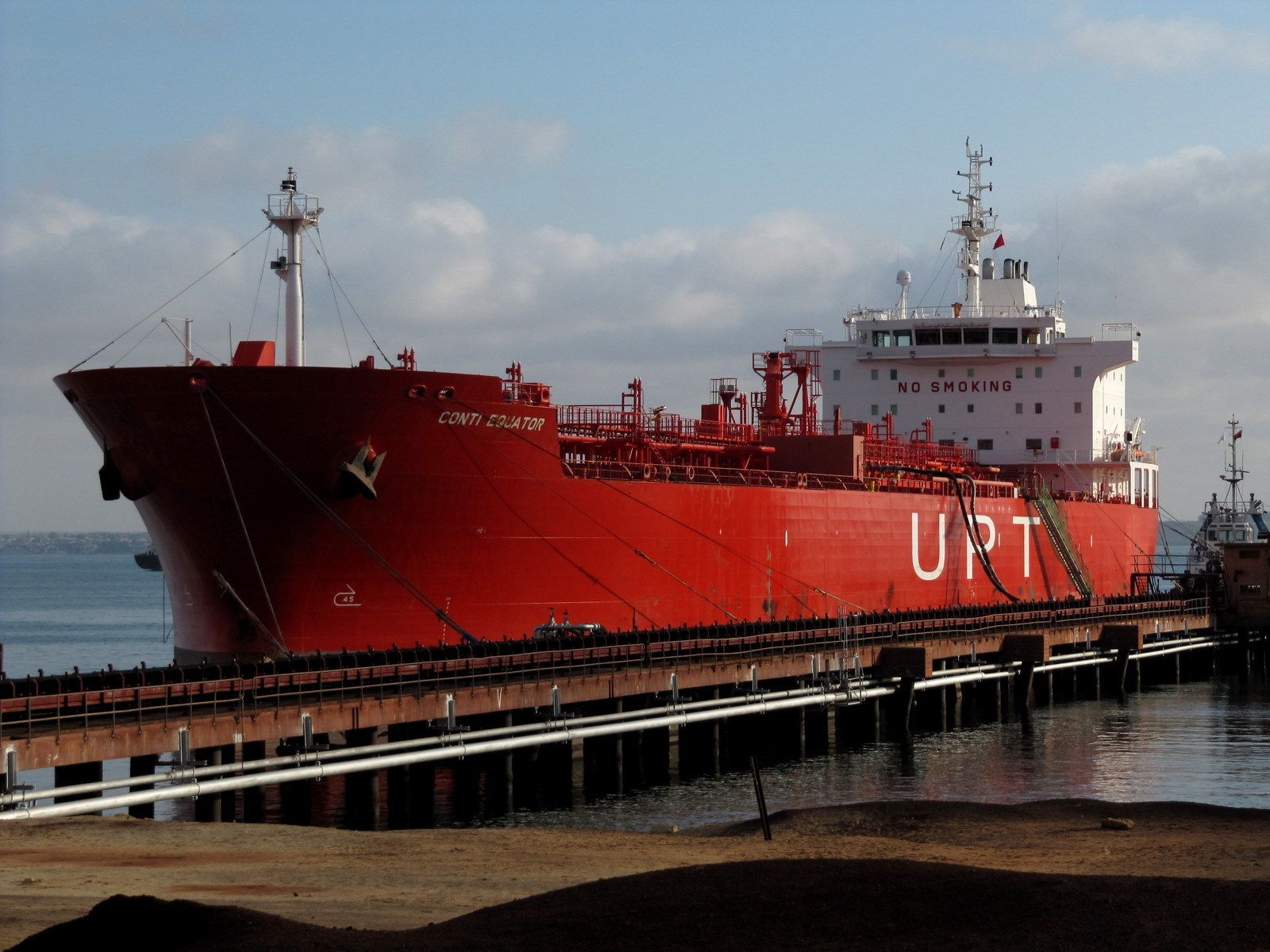
Moçâmedes is a major seaport.

=== Rail ===
Moçâmedes is the terminus of the Moçâmedes Railway. This line was originally 600mm gauge but was converted to 1067mm gauge in the 1950s.

=== Sea ===
It has one of Angola's three major ports, alongside Luanda and Lobito.

=== Air ===
During the colonial era, Moçâmedes had a small aerodrome close to the town: the ‘velho campo de aviação’. The Aero Clube de Moçâmedes flying club operated a flying school there, where Júlia Brito Pestana became the first woman to obtain her pilot’s licence in 1939. The exact location can no longer be identified. Moçâmedes is served by Welwitschia Mirabilis International Airport, with IATA code MSZ.

== See also ==
- Namibe Province

== Bibliography ==
- Clarence-Smith, W. G. Slaves, Peasants and Capitalists in Southern Angola 1840–1926. New York: Cambridge UP, 1979.
- Clarence-Smith, W. G. "Slavery in Coastal Southern Angola, 1875-1913." Journal of Southern African Studies 2.2 (1976), 214–23.
