= Namibe Province =

Province of Angola

Coordinates: 15°11′43″S 12°09′03″E

Namibe
- Province
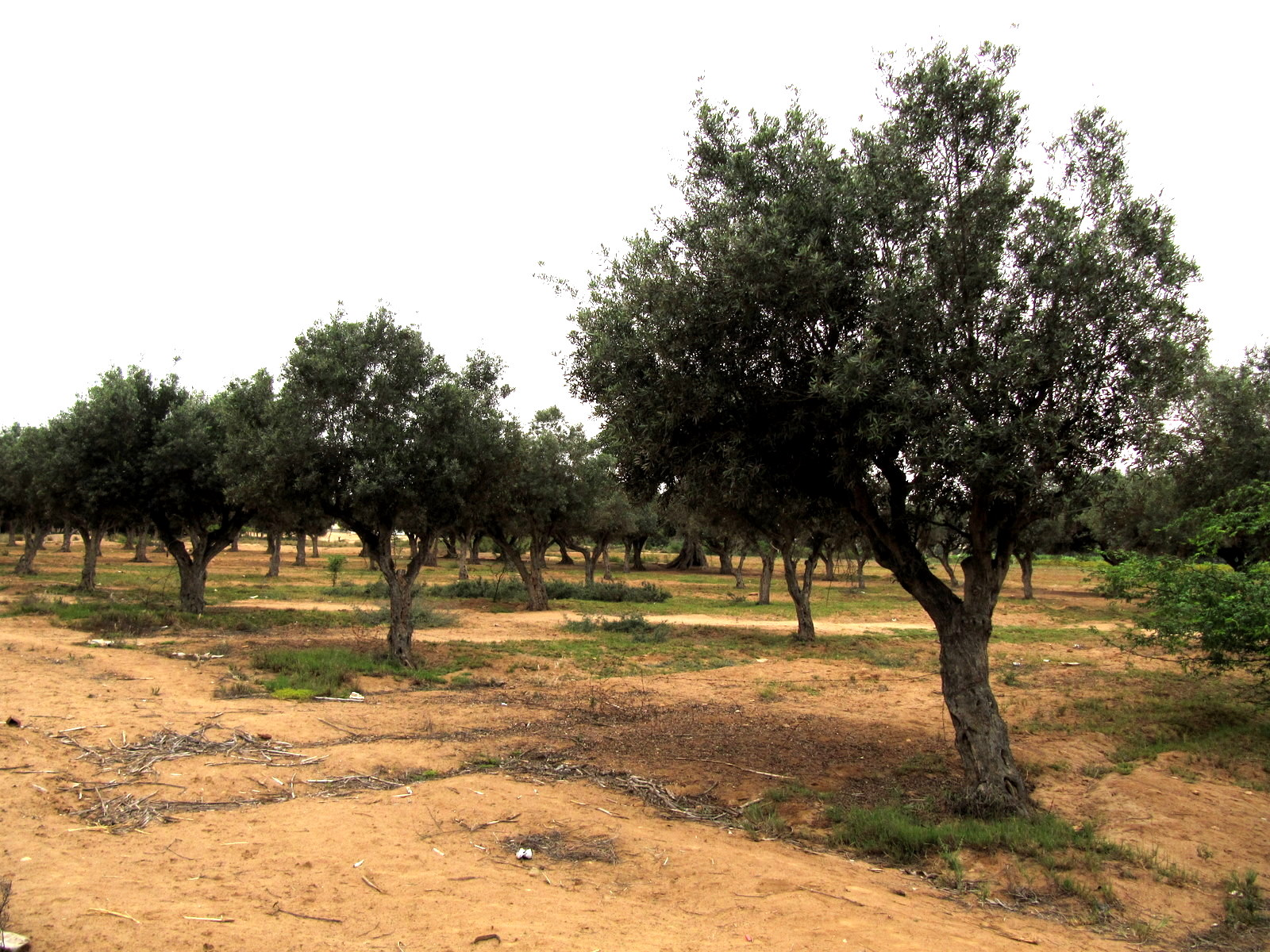
- Olive trees in Namibe Province

- Namibe, province of Angola
- Country: Angola
- Capital: Moçâmedes

Government
  - Governor: Augusto Archer de Sousa Mangueira
  - Vice-Governor for the Political, Economic and Social Sector: Anica Josina Pascoal de Sousa
  - Vice-Governor for Technical Services and Infrastructures: Ema Samali Henriques da Silva

Area
  - Total: 57,091 km^{2} (22,043 sq mi)

Population (2024 census)
  - Total: 815,708
  - Density: 14.288/km^{2} (37.005/sq mi)
- ISO 3166 code: AO-NAM
- HDI (2018): 0.572 medium · 4th
- Website: www.namibe.gov.ao

Namibe Province is a province of Angola. Under Portuguese rule it was the Moçâmedes District. It has an area of 57,091 km^{2} and had a 2024 census population of 815,708. The port and city of Moçâmedes is the capital of the province with a population of 345,000 in 2024. Iona National Park lies within the province.

== History ==
From its foundation by the Portuguese in 1840 and until 1985, the area was known as Moçâmedes (also spelled "Mossâmedes"). The current name of the province is derived from the Namib Desert, lying predominantly in Namibia; the northernmost part, however, extended into the province of Namibe. Extensive flooding in the province occurred on April 5, 2001, with the Bero and Giraul River severely affecting roads and people in Namibe, Huila and Benguela provinces. A reported 20 people in Namibe Province lost their lives during the flood.

== Geography and wildlife ==
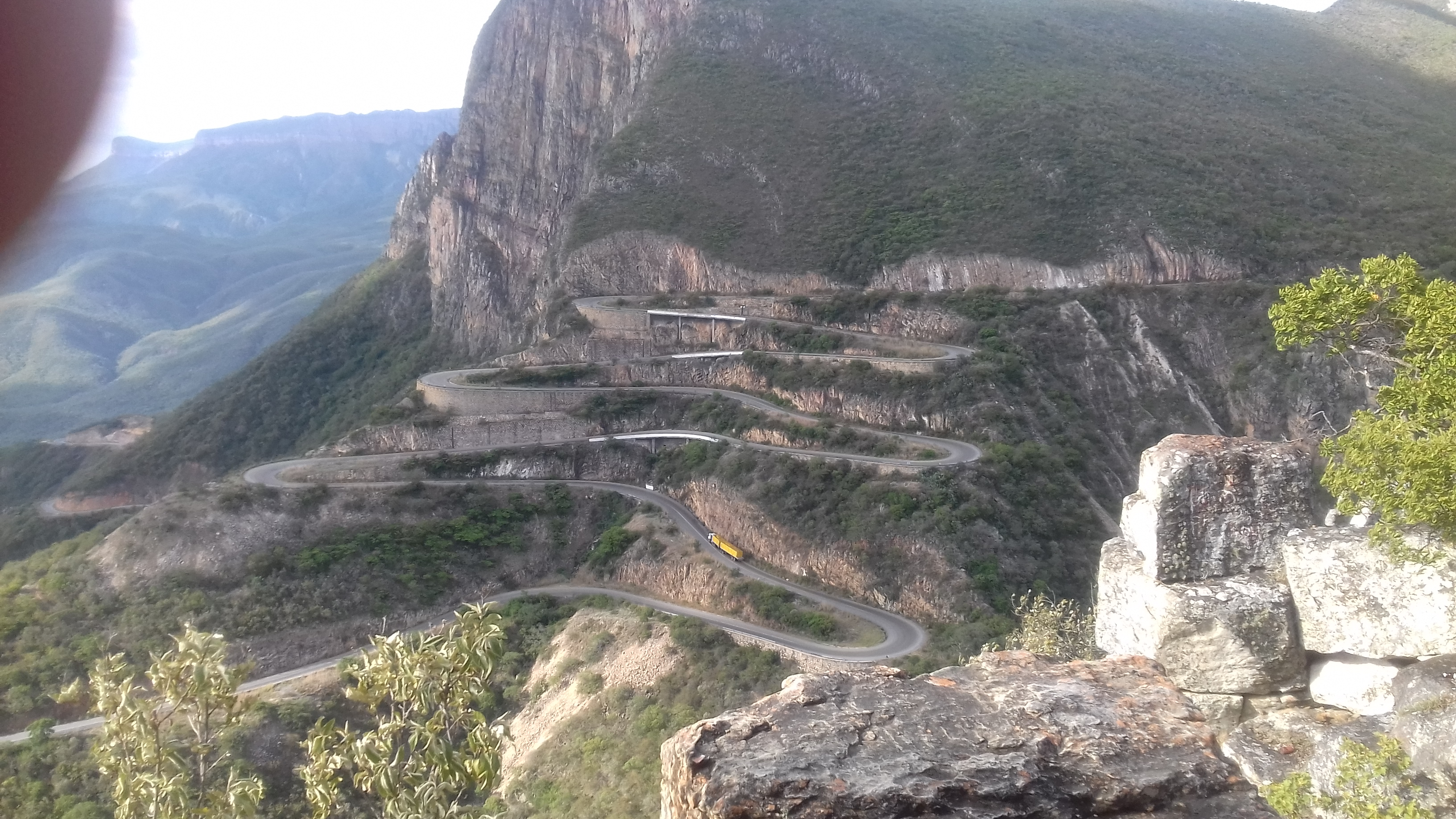
Serra da Leba Road

Namibe Province covers an area of 57,091 km^{2}, much of which is desert. The capital of the province is the city of Moçâmedes, with the second city being Tômbua or Tómbwa (formerly Porto Alexandre). In the Namib Desert can be seen the rare Welwitschia mirabilis, "a strange plant with a giant root", and also the Iona National Park. Lake Arco is a fresh-water oasis in the middle of the desert. Near the coast of the Bentiaba desert and in Iona National Park, Late Cretaceous fossils of sharks, turtles, mosasaurs, plesiosaurs and sauropods have been discovered.

== Municipalities ==
The province of Namibe consists of five municipalities (Portuguese: municípios):

- Bibala
- Camacuio
- Moçâmedes (Namibe until 2016)
- Tômbua
- Virei

== Communes ==
The province of Namibe contains the following communes (Portuguese: comunas); sorted by their respective municipalities:

- Bibala Municipality: – Bibala, Caitou, Capangombe (Kapagombe), Lola
- Camacuio Municipality: – Camacuio, Chingo, Mamué
- Moçâmedes Municipality: – Bentiaba, Lucira, Moçâmedes
- Tômbua Municipality: – Iona (Yona), São Martinho dos Tigres (English: Saint Martin of the Tigers), Tômbua
- Virei Municipality: – Cainde, Virei

== Demographics ==
Namibe Province had a population of 815,708 according to the 2024 census. The desert is sparsely inhabited, but is inhabited by Herero groups (vaKuval, Ova-Himba) and small Khoisan groups (Kwisi, Kwepe).

== Economy ==
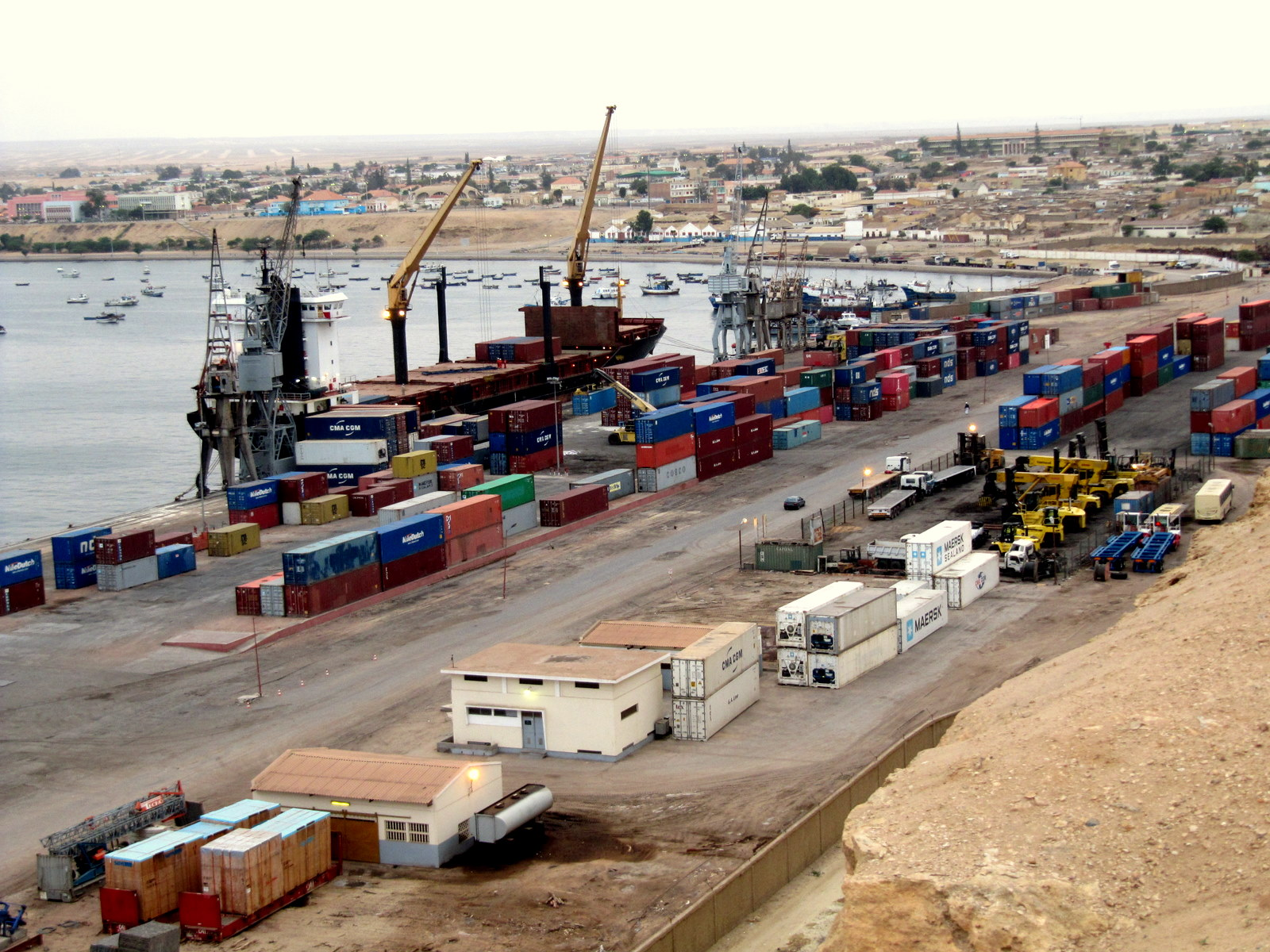
The Commercial Port of Moçâmedes

Agriculture is the main source of income in Namibe Province, the principal crops being citrus fruits, olives, guava, millet, and livestock, including the rearing of sheep and goats. Fishing is another means of livelihood for the people of Namibe Province, Tômbua being the main market. The province has significant reserves of gold, copper, manganese, chromium, tin, lignite and marble. The Yuri Gagarin Airport and the Commercial Port of Moçâmedes, are the two main centres for transport for the import and export of products.

== List of governors of Namibe ==
=== Pre-independence period ===
- 1849–1851 António Sérgio de Sousa
- 1851–1852 José Herculano Ferreira da Horta
- 1852–1854 Carlos Botelho de Vasconcelos
- 1854–1854 António do Canto e Castro
- 1854–1859 Fernando da Costa Leal
- 1859–1861 António Joaquim de Castro
- 1861–1863 João Jacinto Tavares
- 1863–1866 Fernando da Costa Leal
- 1866–1866 Alexandre de Sousa Alvim Pereira
- 1866–1870 Joaquim José da Graça
- 1870–1871 Estanislau de Assunção e Almeida
- 1871–1876 Lúcio Albino Pereira Crespo
- 1876–1876 Francisco Teixeira da Silva
- 1876–1876 José Joaquim Teixeira Beltrão
- 1877–1878 Francisco Augusto da Costa Cabral
- 1878–1878 Sebastião Nunes da Mata
- 1878–1879 Francisco Ferreira do Amaral
- 1879–1880 Sebastião Nunes da Mata
- 1880–1880 José Bento Ferreira de Almeida
- 1880–1886 Sebastião Nunes da Mata
- 1886–1889 Álvaro António da Costa Ferreira
- 1889–1889 Ventura Duarte Barros da Fonseca
- 1889–1892 Luís Bernardino Leitão Xavier
- 1892–1893 Martinho de Queirós Montenegro
- 1893–1895 Júlio José Marques da Costa
- 1895–1896 João de Canto e Castro Antunes
- 1896–1897 João Manuel Mendonça e Gaivão
- 1897–1897 João Manuel Pereira da Silva
- 1897–1899 Francisco Diogo de Sá
- 1899–1902 José Maria d'Aguiar
- 1902–1902 Sebastião Corrêa de Oliveira
- 1902–1903 João Augusto Vieira da Fonseca
- 1903–1904 Viriato Zeferino Passaláqua
- 1904–1905 José Alfredo Ferreira Margarido
- 1905–1907 José Rafael da Cunha
- 1907–1908 António Maria da Silva
- 1908–1910 Alberto Carolino Ferreira da Costa
- 1910–1910 António Brandão de Mello Mimoso
- 1910–1912 Caetano Carvalhal Corrêa Henriques
- 1912–1914 Henrique Monteiro Corrêa da Silva
- 1914 Jose Monteiro de Macedo
- 1914–1916 Alfredo de Albuquerque Felner
- 1916–1918 José Inácio da Silva
- 1918–1919 António Dias
- 1919–1922 José Manuel da Costa
- 1922–1924 Alberto Nunes Freire Quaresma
- 1924–1926 Artur Silva
- 1926–1928 António Augusto de Sequeira Braga
- 1928–1929 Francisco Martins de Oliveira Santos;
- 1929 Alcino José Pereira de Vasconcelos
- 1929–1930 António Augusto de Sequeira Braga
- 1930–1930 José Maria de Seita Machado
- 1930–1935 José Pereira Sabrosa
- 1956–1960 Vasco Falcão Nunes da Ponte
- 1960–1969 José Luís Henriques de Brito
- 1969–1970 1969–1970 Rogério de Abreu Amoreira Martins
- 1970–1971 Agostinho Gomes Pereira
- 1971–1975 Amândio José Rogado

=== Post-independence period ===
| Name | Years in office |
|---|---|
| Amândio José Rogado | 1975–1976 |
| António Lopes da Câmara | 1976–1978 |
| José Ilídio Chilecasse Manjenje | 1978–1979 |
| Marcelino Dias | 1979 |
| Rafael Sapilinha Sambalanga | 1979–1983 |
| Fernando Faustino Muteka | 1983–1988 |
| Domingos José | 1988–1991 |
| Joaquim da Silva Matias | 1991–1999 |
| Salomão José Luheto Xirimbimbi | 1999–2002 |
| Álvaro Manuel de Boavida Neto | 2002–2009 |
| Cândida Celeste da Silva | 2009–2012 |
| Isaac Francisco Maria dos Anjos | 2012–2013 |
| Rui Luís Falcão Pinto de Andrade | 2013–2017 |
| Carlos da Rocha Cruz | 2017–2019 |
| Augusto Archer de Sousa Mangueira | 2019– |

From 1976 to 1991, the official name was Provincial Commissioner.
