= Tundavala Gap =

Canyon in Angola

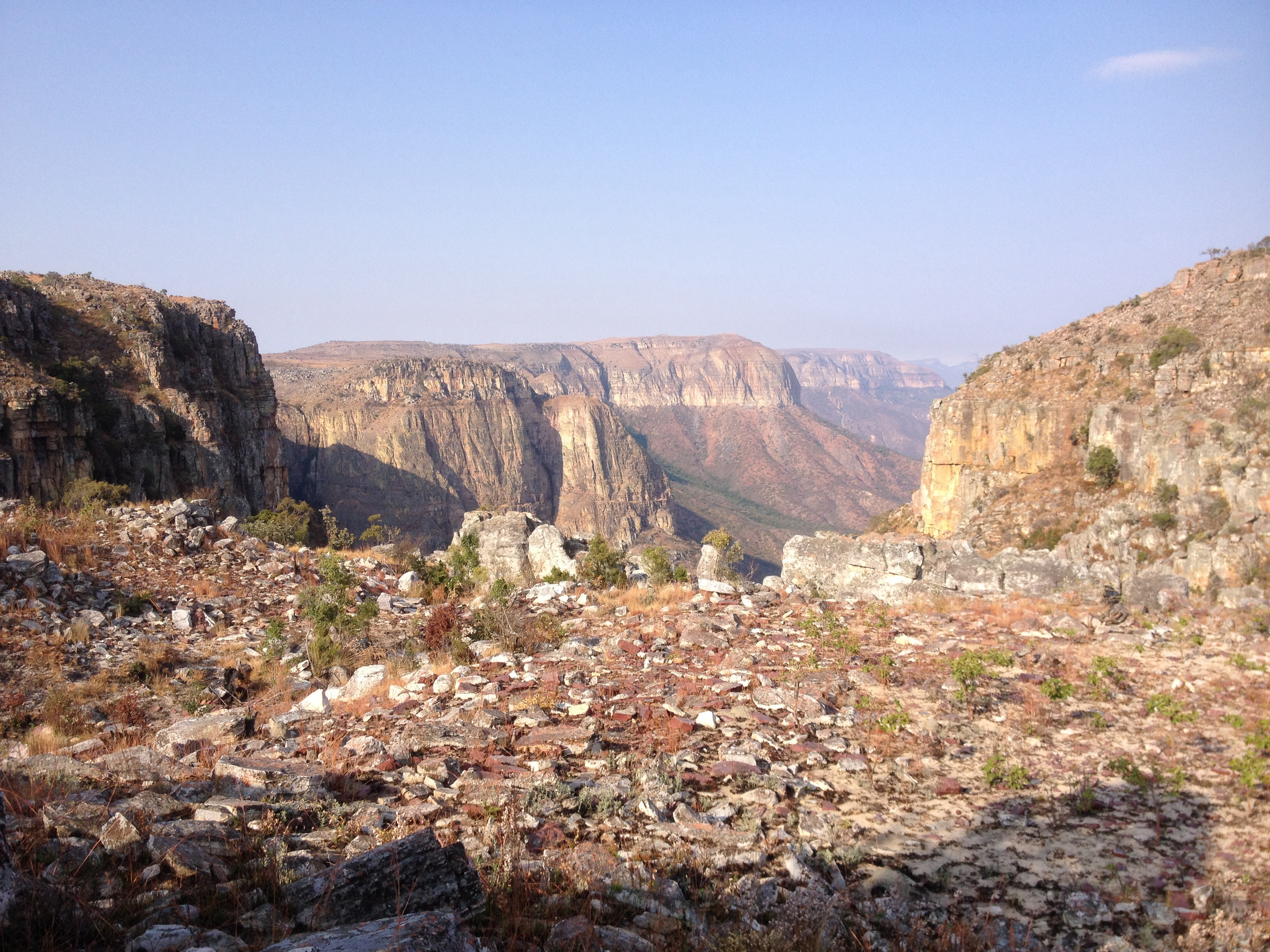

- Location within Angola
- Depth: 1,000 m (3,300 ft)

Naming
- Native name: Fenda da Tundavala (Portuguese)

Geography
- Location: Huíla Province, Angola
- Borders on: Huíla Plateau
- Coordinates: 14°49′3.612″S 13°22′53.184″E
- Interactive map of Tundavala Gap

Tundavala Gap (Portuguese: Fenda da Tundavala) is a canyon on the escarpment of the Serra da Leba near Lubango, Huíla Province, Angola. The escarpment marks the western limit of the Humpata Plateau, part of the Great Escarpment of Southern Africa, and creates a natural boundary between Huíla Province and Namibe Province. The height of the rim exceeds 2,200 metres (7,200 ft), while the plain at the base is approximately 1,000 metres (3,300 ft) below. The viewpoint at the edge of the cliffs, located roughly 18 km (11 mi) from Lubango, overlooks 10,000 km^{2} (3,900 sq mi) towards Moçâmedes.

Tundavala is a popular tourist attraction and an important geoheritage site. On 21 August 2012, the Angolan government named the gap as a cultural landscape. It is considered one of the 7 Natural Wonders of Angola.

== Etymology ==
"Tundavala" is derived from the Nyaneka word Ntandavala, which has several meanings: 'what was attached/shrunken and stretched', 'what is open/apart', 'the aperture' or 'the space left by two sides'.

Tundavala National Stadium in Lubango is named after Tundavala Gap.

== Geography ==
Tundavala Gap is located about 18 km (11 mi) from Lubango, in the Huíla Province of Angola. It sits on the western edge of the Humpata Plateau, an extension of the Huíla Plateau, inside the Serra da Leba mountain range. It opens westward towards Namibe Province, overlooking 10,000 km^{2} (3,900 sq mi) northwest towards Moçâmedes.

At its peak, Tundavala Gap reaches a height of about 2,200 metres (7,200 ft), and its cliffs are about 1,000 metres (3,300 ft) deep.

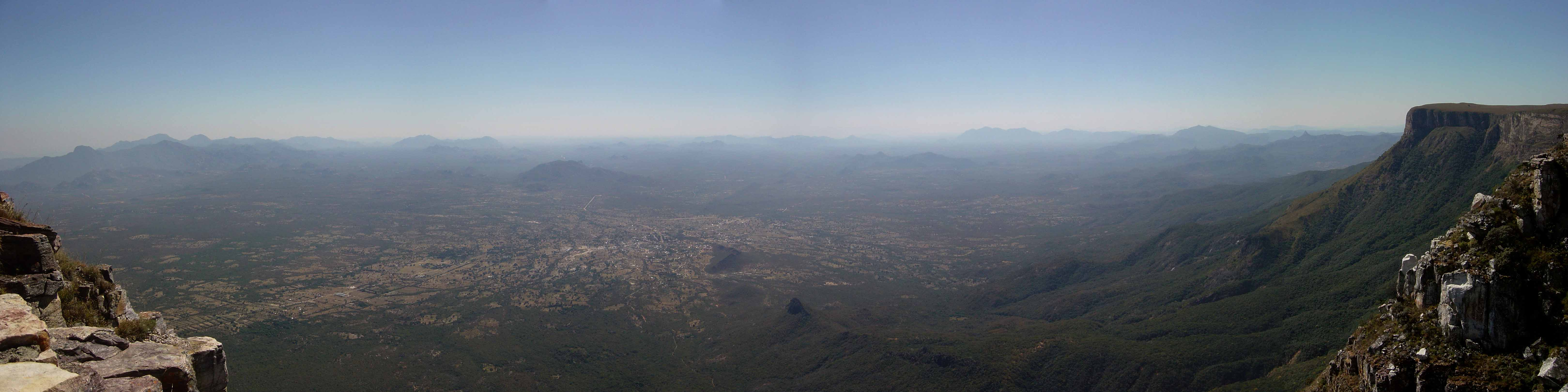
View from the Tundavala Gap viewpoint
