= Angolan montane forest–grassland mosaic =

Ecoregion prallel to Angola's coast

Angolan montane forest-grassland mosaic
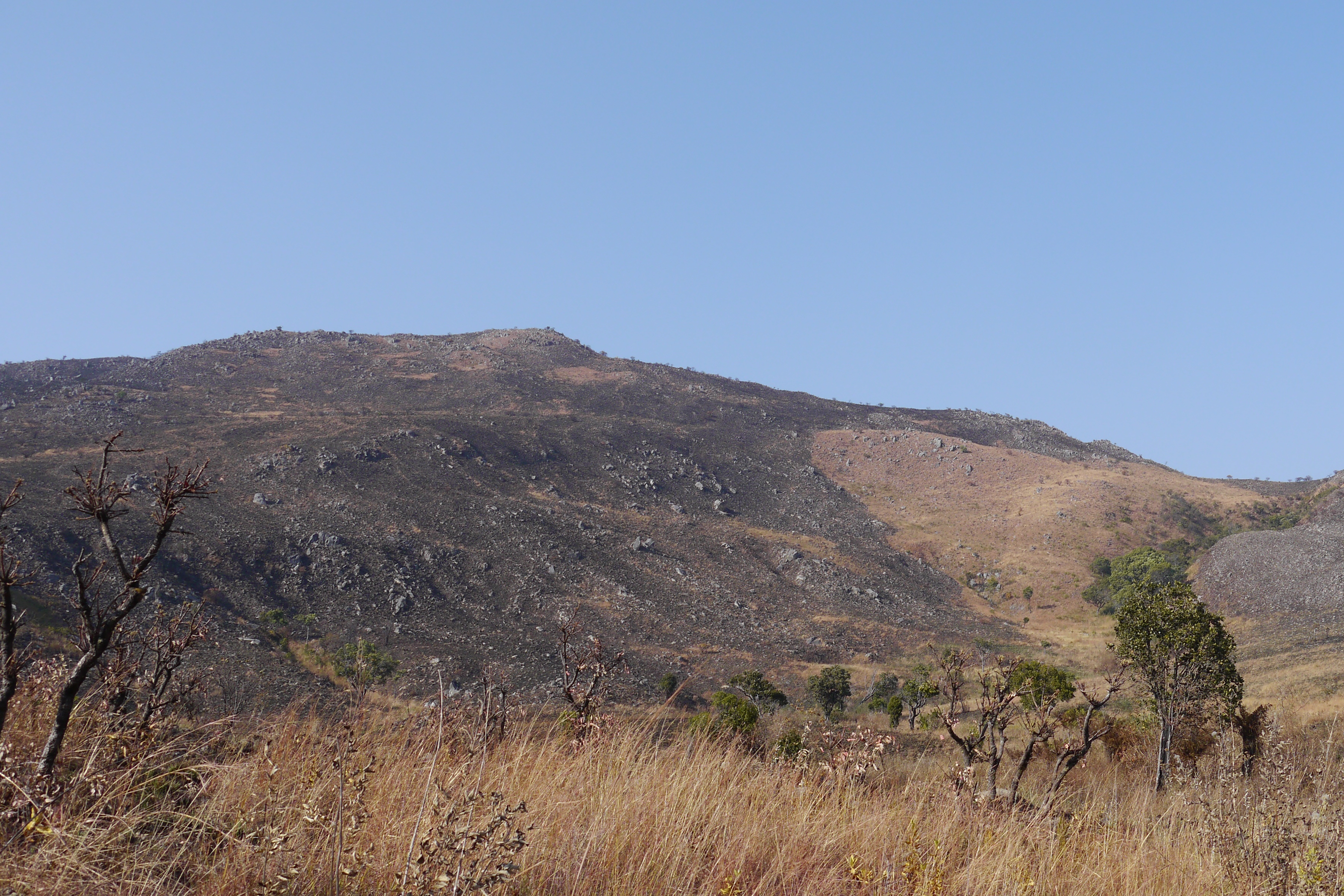
- Mount Moco, Angola

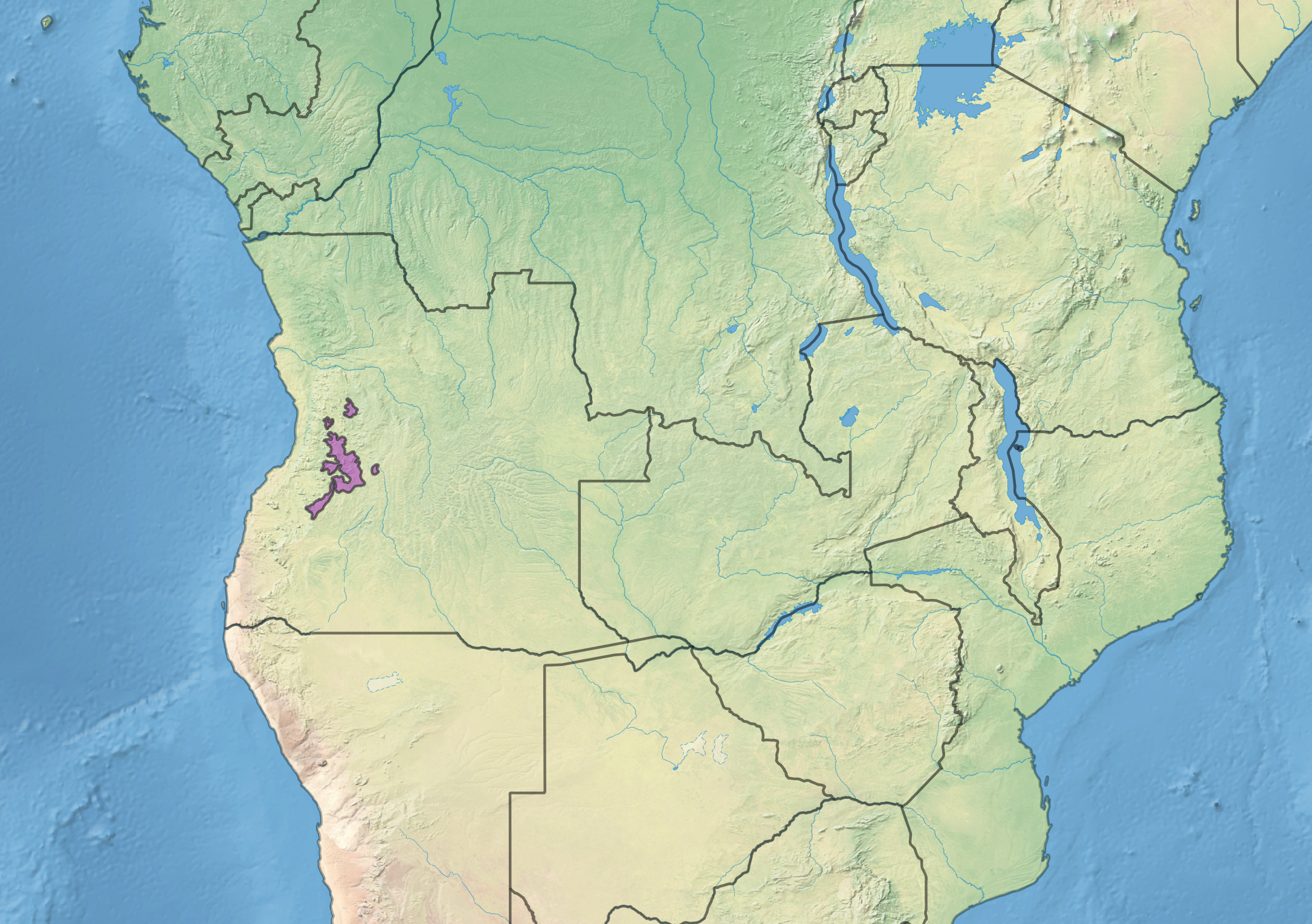
- Map of Angolan Montane Forest-Grassland Ecoregion

Ecology
- Realm: Afrotropical
- Biome: montane grasslands and shrublands
- Borders: Angolan miombo woodlands; Angolan Scarp savanna and woodlands

Geography
- Area: 25,573 km^{2} (9,874 sq mi)
- Countries: Angola

Conservation
- Conservation status: Critical/endangered
- Protected: 0%

The Angolan montane forest-grassland mosaic ecoregion is located on the east-facing inland side of the belt of mountains that stands parallel to the coast of Angola, 50–100 km inland.

== Geography ==
These inland slopes are mostly covered with grassland and savanna. The woodland once covered a much larger area but today only patches survive, mainly in deep ravines and on the higher peaks in Huambo and Cuanza Sul provinces, such as Mount Moco (2,620 m), Mount Mepo (2,582 m), Mount Lubangue (2,554 m), Mount Namba (2582 m), and on the Serra da Chela in Huíla Province.

The towns of Huambo and Lubango are located at the edge of the ecoregion.

== Climate ==
The area has a wet summer and some mist and rainfall year-round so water is fairly abundant though in the dry season obtainable in some places only by digging in the sandy beds of the rivers.

== Flora ==
Open montane grassland is the predominant plant community above 1600 meters elevation. In the dry season fires are common and the dry grasses burn and are then renewed. Shrubs include species of Erica, sugarbushes (Protea) and Cliffortia, and grasses Themeda triandra and species of Tristachya, Hyparrhenia, Festuca, and Monocymbium.

Forest patches occur above 1800 meters elevation, in moist ravines and on high mountain slopes. Forest patches tend to be small, from 1 to 20 hectares, with an irregular tree canopy 8 to 15 meters high. The forest patches are not so vulnerable to fire. The Afromontane woodland flora has similarities with that of other mountain ranges across Africa. The predominant tree is the conifer Podocarpus latifolius. Other canopy trees are mainly evergreen broadleaved trees, including Polyscias fulva, Apodytes dimidiata, Pittosporum viridiflorum, Syzygium guineense afromontanum, Halleria lucida, Olea spp., and Ilex mitis.

== Fauna ==
The fauna includes a number of bird species unique to the highlands such as Boulton's batis (Batis margaritae), Swierstra's spurfowl (Pternistis swierstra), Angola cave-chat (Xenocopsychus ansorgei) grey-striped spurfowl (Pternistis griseostriatus) and Angola slaty flycatcher (Dioptrornis brunneus). Ludwig's double-collared sunbird (Cinnyris ludovicensis) is native to the Angolan montane forest–grassland mosaic and to the Nyika Plateau of Malawi. Some of these species have close relatives in other forests of the continent, more indication that this woodland was once much more widespread.

Native mammals include the yellow baboon (Papio cynocephalus), red-footed squirrel (Funisciurus pyrropus), common duiker (Sylvicapra grimmia), blue duiker (Philantomba monticola), and bushpig (Potamochoerus larvatus). Large grazing mammals recorded in the mid-1970s include Burchell's zebra (Equus quagga burchelli), common eland (Taurotragus oryx), southern reedbuck (Redunca arundinum), oribi (Ourebia ourebi), and roan antelope (Hippotragus equinus), but most are now either rare in or extirpated from the ecoregion.

Two species of shrew, the heather shrew (Crocidura erica) and blackish white-toothed shrew (Crocidura nigricans), are limited to the ecoregion and some adjacent areas of the surrounding Angolan miombo woodlands.

== Threats ==
The highlands are one of the most heavily populated parts of Angola so the woodland is vulnerable to clearance for logging, while some of the grassland, except where it is very swampy, is being cleared for agriculture. Furthermore, the mountains were the scene of much conflict and poverty during the Angolan Civil War and as a consequence the wildlife has been little studied or protected. None of the ecoregion is in protected areas.
