= Huíla Plateau =

Plateau in Angola

Huíla Plateau Planalto da Huíla (Portuguese)
- Plateau
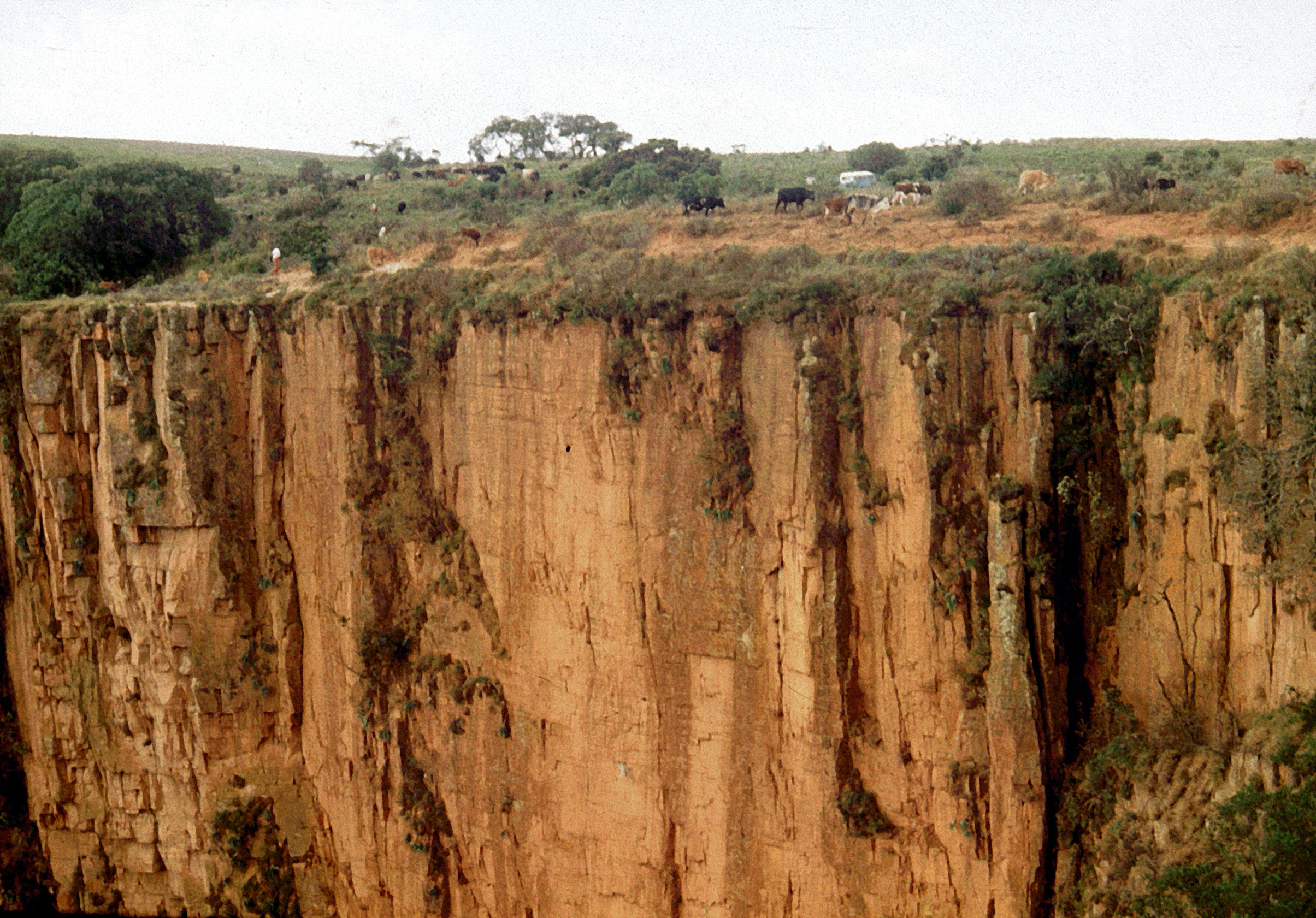
- Canyon in the Huíla Plateau

- Location within Angola
- Coordinates: 15.01°S 13.75°E
- Location: South-central Angola

Area
  - Total: 300 kilometres (190 mi)
- Highest elevation: 2,300 metres (7,500 ft) (Humpata Plateau)

The Huíla Plateau (Portuguese: Planalto da Huíla) is a large plateau and highlands region in south-central Angola. It is part of the Great Escarpment and forms the southernmost stretch of the Central Plateau of Angola. It is separated from the Atlantic Coast by the Serra da Leba and Serra da Chela mountain ranges, extending southward to the Namib Desert at Angola's border with Namibia. Its western edge forms the border between the Huíla and Namibe Provinces.

== Geography ==
The Huíla Plateau is located in south-central Angola, on the southern extremity of the Bié Plateau. Its southern edge skirts the Namib Desert, and its southeastern edge runs along the Cunene Basin.

Its western edge forms the natural boundary between the Huíla and Namibe Provinces, roughly extending from Chongorói, Benguela Province, in the north, to Onkokwa, Cunene Province, in the south. This edge is characterized by deep escarpments, such as the Tundavala Gap, and is part of the Great Escarpment. Along this edge are the Serra da Leba and Serra de Chela mountain ranges. Beyond this is a desert/beach region along the Atlantic Coast.

The plateau is subdivided into two main plateaus: the Humpata and the Bimbe Plateaus. Lubango, the capital of Huíla Province, sits atop Humpata Plateau.

Besides Serra da Leba and Serra da Chela, the plateau contains several smaller mountain ranges and highland subregions. Along the southwest edge near Onkokwa, the plateau contains the Chabiva and Muvelaumo Mountain Ranges.

Its highest elevation is 2,300 metres (7,500 ft) at the Humpata Plateau and its lowest is 1,000 metres (3,300 ft) near Onkokwa.

=== Geomorphology ===
The geomorphology of the plateau subdivides it into three main regions: the Ancient Plateau, which comprises the main body of the highlands; the Marginal Mountain Range located on its northern boundary; and the Escarpment Zone, a transitional zone dividing the high plateau from the arid coast.

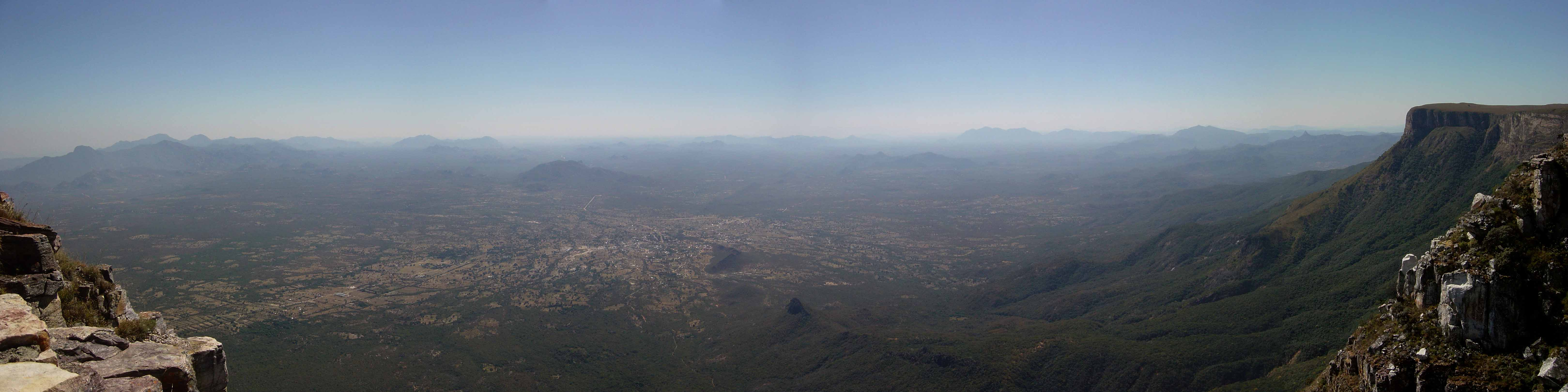
View of Lubango, which sits atop the Huíla Plateau, from Tundavala Gap

== Geology ==
The Huíla Plateau sits atop a layer of dolomitic bedrock called the Leba-Tchamalindi Formation, which formed during the Paleoproterozoic. The plateau was once on the shoreline, supported by the presence of reef knolls inside its limestone outcroppings. Over time, heavy erosion and tectonic activity created a karstic landscape. Today, this presents as a vast network of steep ridges, valleys, and cliffs, and subterranean caves, sinkholes, and tunnels.

== Climate ==
The climate of the Huíla Plateau is highly variable. The monsoon lasts from October to April, followed by a dry season during the off months, with an average annual precipitation from 800 to 900 mm (31 to 35 in). Temperatures typically average 17–18°C, with extreme highs of 35–37°C in summer and extreme lows of –2°C in winter. Inside the Tchivinguiro Depression, a valley in the Humpata Plateau, exists a Mediterranean microclimate, which receives markedly more rainfall: approximately 926 mm (36.5 in) per year.
