= Huila =

Huila or Huíla may refer to:

== Places ==
- Huila Department, in Colombia
- Huíla Province, in Angola
- Huíla Plateau, in Angola
- Nevado del Huila, (Mount Huila) volcano in Colombia
- Huila River, stream in Sangre Grande, Trinidad and Tobago
- Huila, Pichincha, populated place in Pichincha Province, Ecuador
- Huila, La Paz, populated place in La Paz Department (Bolivia)
- Huila, Cauca, populated place in Cauca Department, Colombia
- Huila, Junín, populated place in Junín Region, Peru

== Other ==
- Atlético Huila, a first division association football team in Colombia
