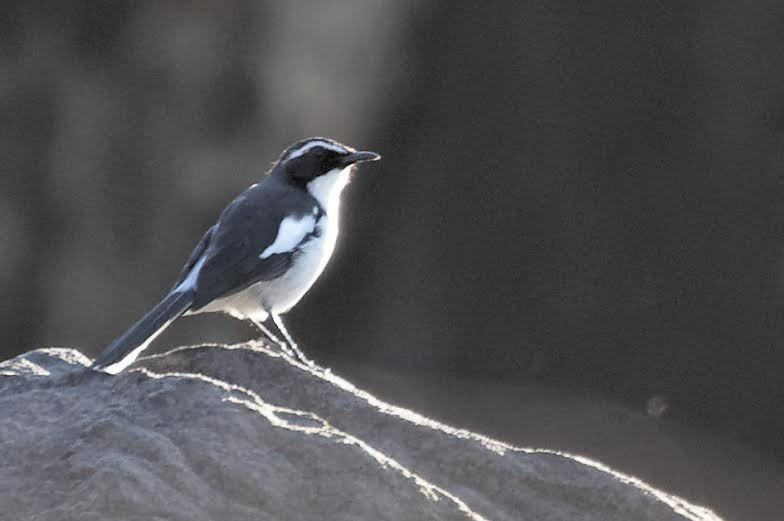

Conservation status
- Least Concern (IUCN 3.1)

Scientific classification
- Kingdom: Animalia
- Phylum: Chordata
- Class: Aves
- Order: Passeriformes
- Family: Muscicapidae
- Genus: Xenocopsychus; Hartert, EJO, 1907
- Species: X. ansorgei

Binomial name
- Xenocopsychus ansorgei Hartert, EJO, 1907

Synonyms
- Cossypha ansorgei

= Angola cave chat =

Angolan cave chat

Species of bird

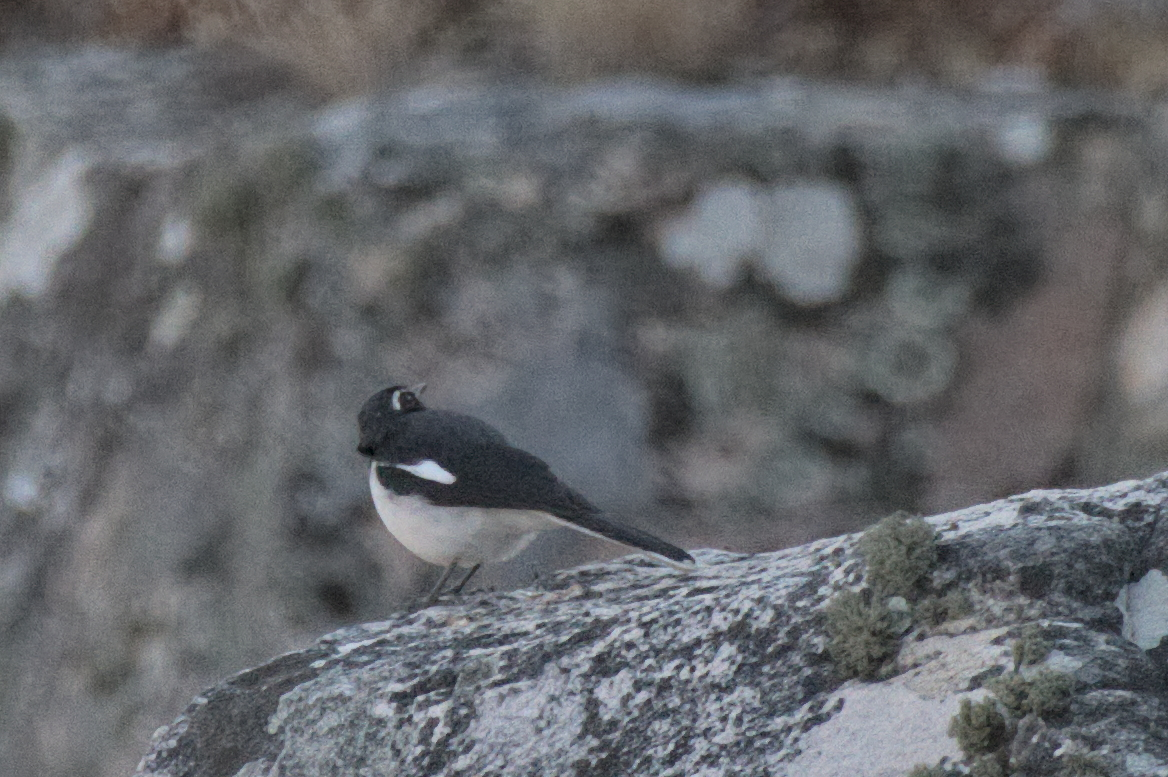
Angola cave chat

The Angola cave chat (Xenocopsychus ansorgei) is a small passerine bird in the Old World flycatcher family Muscicapidae. It is the sole member of the monotypic genus Xenocopsychus; although it was placed in Cossypha between 2010 and 2022 based on the results of a 2010 molecular phylogenetic study, this placement was found to be an error. It occurs locally from western Angola to marginally south of the Kunene River in northern Namibia. Its natural habitat is rocky places in moist to dry savanna. It was previously described as being Near threatened, but has since been downgraded to Least concern.

== Description ==
The Angola cave chat is a small (18–19 cm) pied bird with a broad white supercilium, black upperparts and wings, and white uppertail coverts and underparts. The eye, bill, legs, and feet are all black in color.

The sexes are similar, but the female is slightly smaller. The juvenile is similar to the adult, but has a yellowish wash to the breast and flanks.

== Voice ==
The call of the Angola cave chat is a series of three clear whistles (uii, tii, tii). The first call is higher-pitched, and the other two are lower pitched. This call is also sometimes reversed, with two lower pitched calls at the start, and one higher-pitched call at the end.

The song is a fluting duululu, duulu, duululu with harsh chip notes in between. It also gives a harsh alarm call (birr-djarr).

== Distribution and habitat ==
It is restricted to eight locations across Angola and northern Namibia, namely - N'dalatando, Kumbira Forest, Mount Soque, Mount Moco, Tundavala Gap, the Namba Mountains and the Zebra Mountains.

It is mainly found in rocky sandstone slopes, cliffs with crevices, and it is found close to forest and thornbush thickets. It occurs between 700 and 2200 metres.

== Behavior ==
This species is usually found either singly or in pairs. It forages on the ground and on lichen-covered boulders and rocks.

== Breeding ==
This species is monogamous and territorial. The breeding season is between September and November, and the nest is a cup of dry twigs, leaves and plant fibres.

It lays 2 to 3 white and reddish-speckled eggs.
