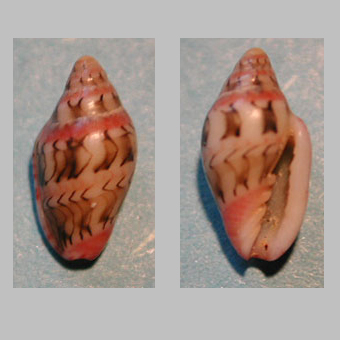

Scientific classification
- Kingdom: Animalia
- Phylum: Mollusca
- Class: Gastropoda
- Subclass: Caenogastropoda
- Order: Neogastropoda
- Family: Marginellidae
- Genus: Marginella
- Species: M. festiva

Binomial name
- Marginella festiva Kiener, 1841

= Marginella festiva =

Species of gastropod

Marginella festiva is a species of sea snail, a marine gastropod mollusk in the family Marginellidae, the margin snails.

== Description ==
The shell is thick, stout, and biconical, with a low, broad protoconch forming the apex. The suture is distinct, and the body whorl is dominant, giving the shell an elongated, tapering profile. The aperture is moderately open, with a thickened, medially reinforced outer lip that is moderately to strongly denticulate, including inner labial teeth numbering seven. The sutures between the whorls are inconspicuous, and the columellais robust, bearing strong folds.

The shell is off-white to whitish, irregularly mottled with fulvous tones, and encircled by three rose-colored spiral bands, corresponding to alternating broad beige spiral bands with irregular blackish patches and whitish interspaces, crossed by a narrow pinkish-red to orange-yellow spiral band; sinuous black axial lines run along the shell, becoming faint across the colored band but remaining distinct on whitish areas, and the outer surface and lip edge bear nine to ten reddish to reddish-brown spiral marks.

The animal has a whitish to glassy hyaline foot bordered by a fine golden-yellow to golden-orange rim except at the anterior mentum. The siphon is white to very pale yellowish, sometimes with a yellow tip. A medium orange to reddish-orange marking is aligned with the rhinophore, and a distinct orange spot surrounds each eye.

Specimens across the species’ known range show little variation in shell morphology or coloration, with differences largely restricted to slight variation in shade rather than in pattern.

The shell attains a length of up to 5 inches.

== Taxonomy ==
Marginella festiva is the currently accepted name. It has also been treated under the subgeneric classification Marginella (Mordicamarginella) festiva. In a 2017 revision, Franck Boyer recognized M. festiva and M. bavayi as distinct allopatric sibling species and concluded that the specimens illustrated as M. festiva by George Brettingham Sowerby II in 1846 actually represent a different species, probably from São Tomé and Príncipe or the coast of Angola.

More broadly, M. festiva has been placed within a North-West African species group characterized by a slightly developed posterior notch and strongly developed labial denticles, together with M. bavayi and M. cleryi, and separated from other regional assemblages (including Angolan, Namibian, and southern African lineages) based on shell morphology and coastal distribution patterns.

== Distribution ==
M. Festiva is found along the coast of Senegal, particularly on the Cap-Vert Peninsula, Examined specimens have been collected from Gorée Island to Cap des Almadies. The species has been recorded only from this region, and its distribution appears highly localized.

== Habitat ==
M. festiva is associated with hard-substrate environments. It has been recorded on shipwrecks with short algal turf, sand-covered rocks, coralligenous formations, and bryozoan clumps. It may occur in very shallow water, where it has been observed crawling openly during the day at depths of around 3–4 m.
