= Serra da Leba =

Mountain in Angola

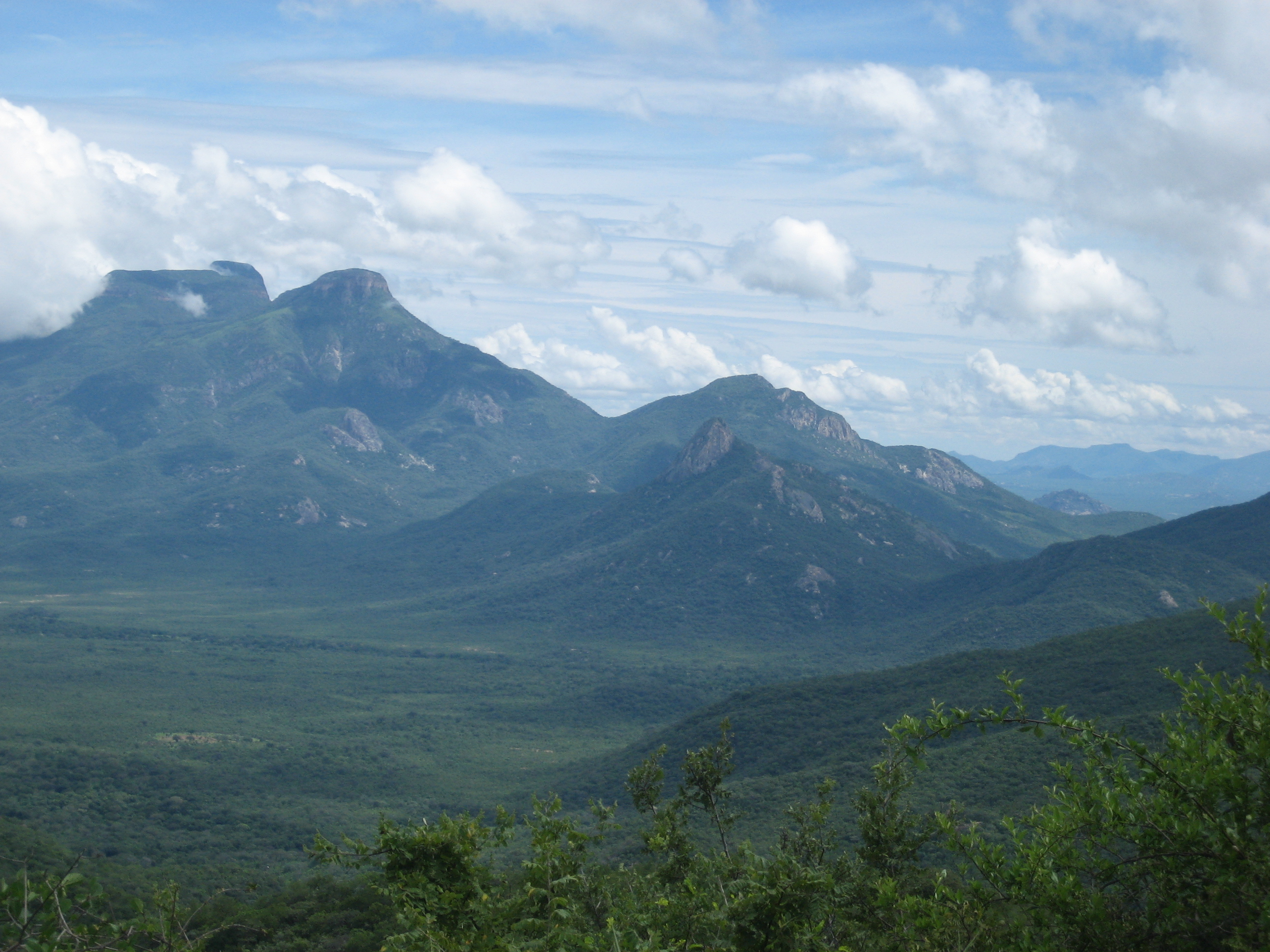

Highest point
- Coordinates: 15°04′15.9″S 13°14′55.1″E

Geography
- Location within Angola
- Location: Namibe, Angola

Serra da Leba is a mountain range in the province of Namibe, in Angola.

Located near the city of Lubango, Serra da Leba is famous for its altitude (Mount Moco at 2,620 metres (8,600 ft) is the highest mountain in Angola), for its beauty, and also for the Serra da Leba pass and road up to 1,845 m altitude.

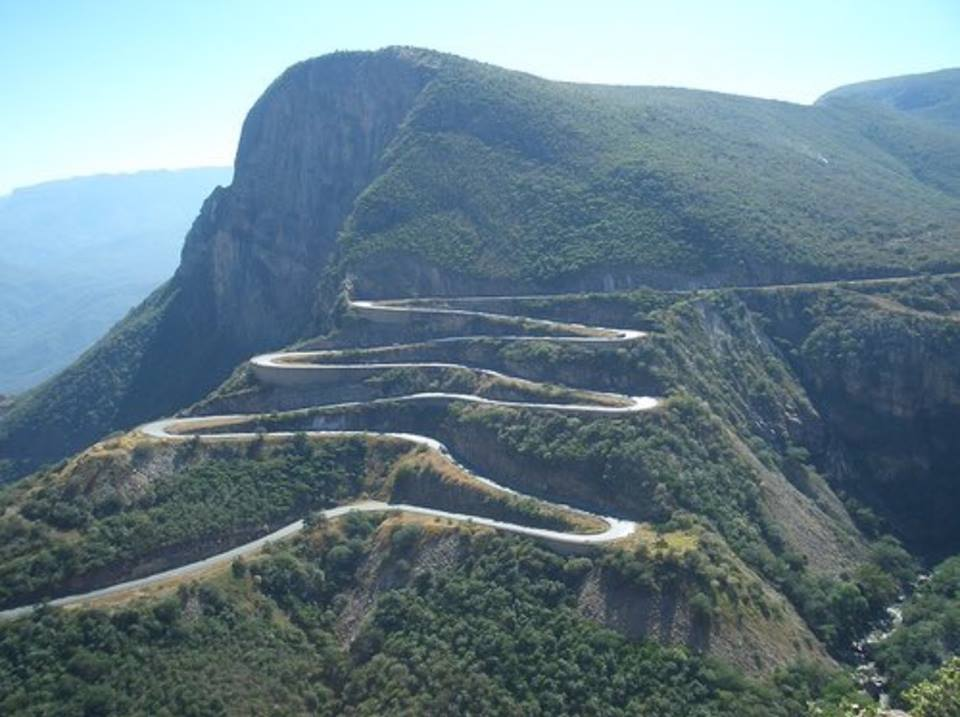
Serra da Leba Road
