= Humpata Plateau =

Plateau in Angola

Humpata Plateau Planalto da Humpata (Portuguese)
- Plateau
- Coordinates: 15.31667°S 13.46667°E
- Location: South-central Angola
- Elevation: 2,300 metres (7,500 feet)

The Humpata Plateau (Portuguese: Planalto da Humpata) is an elevated plateau and highlands region in southwest Angola, part of the larger Huíla Plateau. It has a semi-humid climate, and acts as an intermediate climactic region between the arid Namib Desert to the west and the wetter Kalahari Basin to the east. It is a potential water source for the city of Lubango through diversion of its groundwater.

The region is the source of several fossil specimens dating from the Quaternary period. Some such specimens have been retrieved from breccias where animals became trapped in crevasses. Several living species of rodent are also known only from this plateau: Gerbilliscus cf. humpatensis, Graphiurus sp. indet. 1 and a unique taxonomic unit of Rhabdomys dilectus.

== Fossils ==
Fossils of animals excavated from locations within Humpata Plateau include:

- †Pronolagus humpatensis
- †Theropithecus baringensis
- Pronolagus sp.
- Hystrix africaeaustralis
- Equus quagga
- Antidorcas marsupialis
- Soricidae sp.
- Murinae sp.
- Muridae sp.
- Bovidae sp.

Several taxa of diatom have also been identified in the region, and have been used as historic climate indicators.
