= Kumbira Forest =

Forest in Angola

Kumbira Forest is a forest in Angola that is notable for its large variety of birds, including the Pulitzer's longbill, forest scrub robin and Gabela akalat. The forest is part of the Gabela Important Birding Area. It runs through the Cuanza Norte Province and Cuanza Sul Province. It was aimed to document the floristic diversity of Angola. The forest is located 10 kilometers away from Conda.

== Background ==
The forest has at least 100 species of plants. The forest is currently protected to preserve Angolan biodiversity, but human activities such as slashing and burning still occur. There are 230 listed bird species in the forest.
