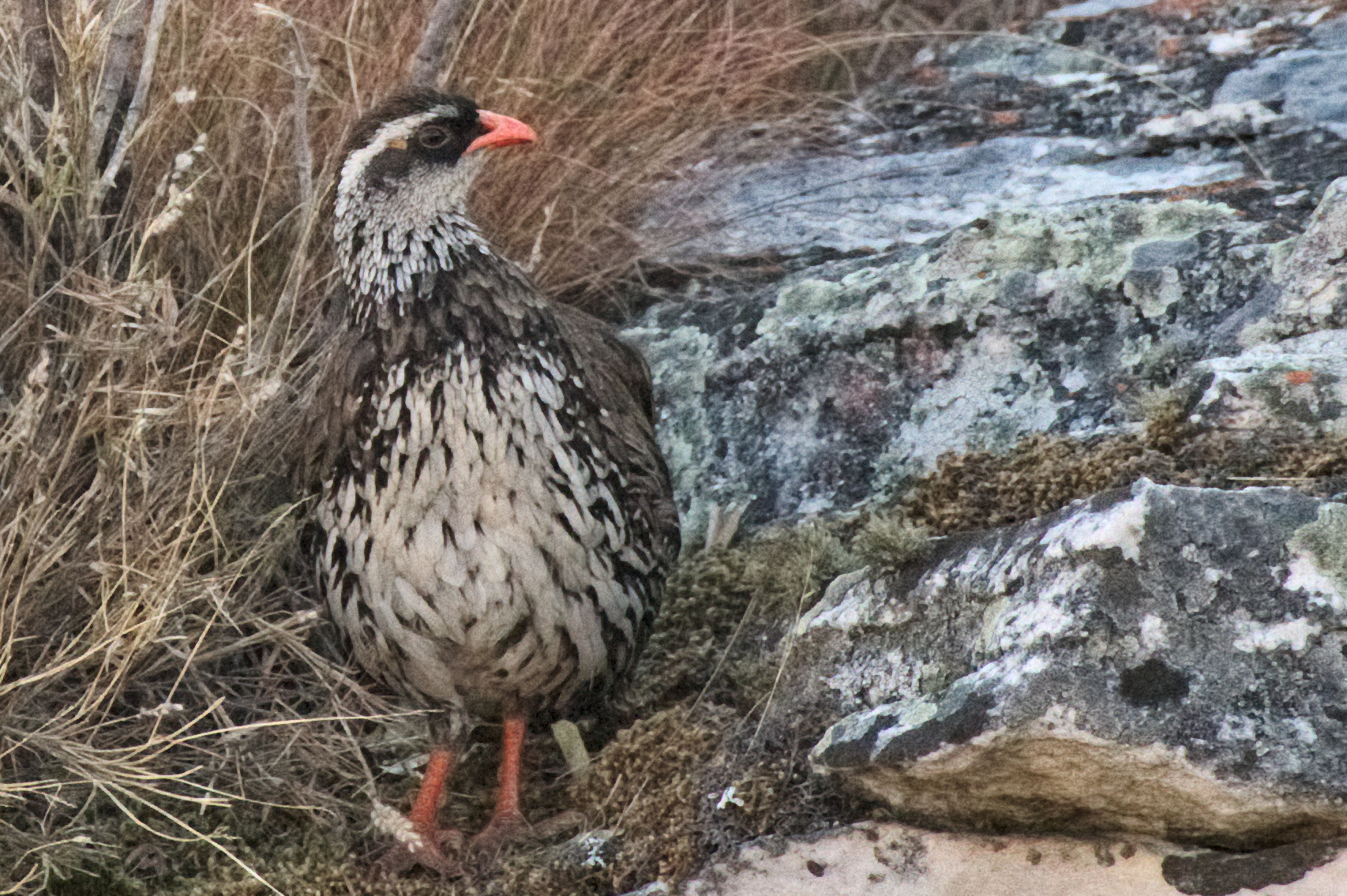
- Swierstra's spurfowl in Angola

Conservation status
- Vulnerable (IUCN 3.1)

Scientific classification
- Kingdom: Animalia
- Phylum: Chordata
- Class: Aves
- Order: Galliformes
- Family: Phasianidae
- Genus: Pternistis
- Species: P. swierstrai

Binomial name
- Pternistis swierstrai (Roberts, 1929)
- geographic distribution

Synonyms
- Francolinus swierstrai

= Swierstra's spurfowl =

Species of bird

Swierstra's spurfowl (Pternistis swierstrai) is a species of bird in the family Phasianidae. It is found only in Angola in the rapidly shrinking Afromontane forests of peaks such as Mount Moco and Mount Soque.

Its natural habitat is subtropical or tropical moist montane forests. It is threatened by habitat loss.

The scientific name commemorates the South African entomologist Cornelis Jacobus Swierstra.

== Taxonomy ==
Swierstra's spurfowl was described in 1929 by the South African zoologist Austin Roberts from a specimen that had been collected in Mombola, Angola. He coined the binomial name Chaetopus swierstrai, choosing the specific epithet to honour the South African entomologist Cornelis Jacobus Swierstra. The species is now placed in the genus Pternistis that was introduced by the German naturalist Johann Georg Wagler in 1832. Swierstra's spurfowl is monotypic: no subspecies are recognised.
