= Serra da Chela =

Mountain range in Angola

Coordinates: 15.499341°S 13.494644°E

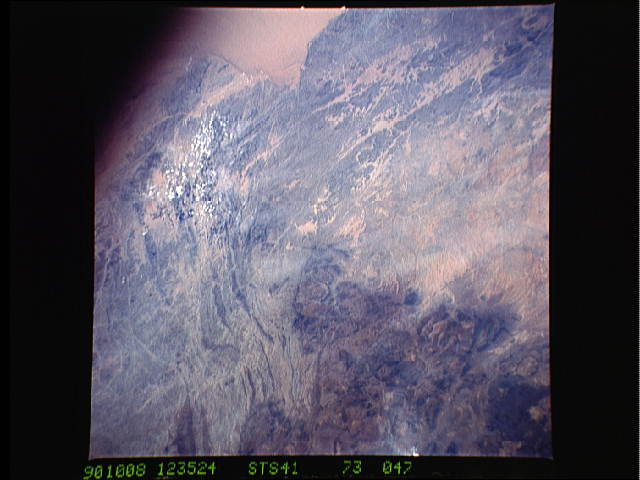
- Satellite image of Serra da Chela

Geography
- Location within Angola

The Serra da Chela is a mountain range in south-central Angola. The mountains, rising to 2,306 meters (7,566 ft) above the coastal plains, are among the highest in the country. It forms part of the Great Escarpment of southern Africa, separating the Huíla Plateau of the interior from the low-lying coastal Namib Desert.

To its west there are some inselbergs, remnants of the plateau from a time when it was more extensive. The range is impassable in many places, but the escarpment may be accessed by the road running east from Capangombe to Humpata on the plateau.

The range was formed approximately 200 million years ago, when the supercontinent Pangaea broke up. What is now the Serra da Chela range was on the edge of one of the tectonic plates where Africa connected to South America, and rose slowly upward as the Atlantic Ocean formed between the separating plates.
