= Mount Moco =

Highest mountain in Angola

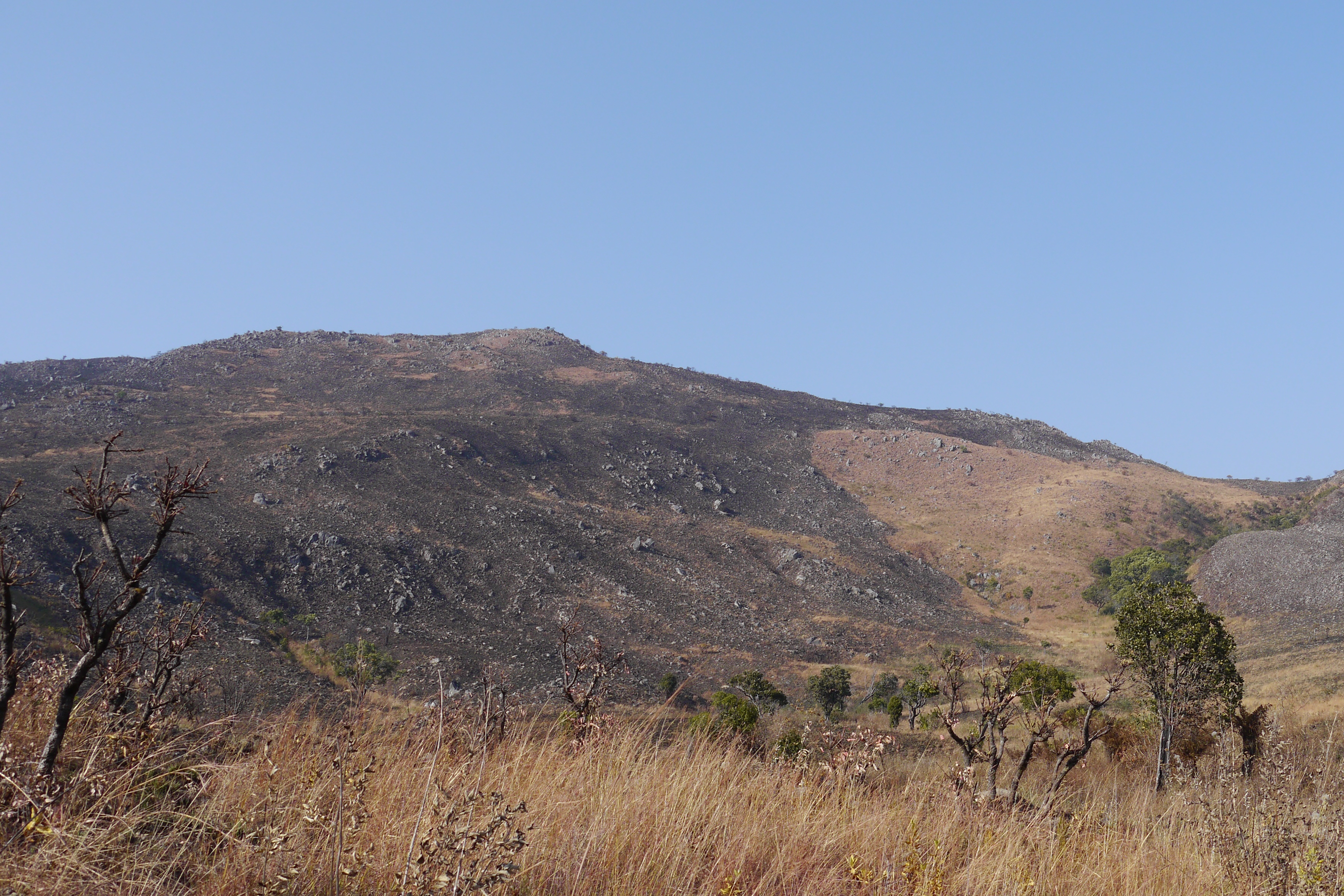

Highest point
- Elevation: 2,620 m (8,600 ft)
- Prominence: 1,513 m (4,964 ft)
- Listing: Country high point Ultra
- Coordinates: 12°28′00″S 15°10′00″E

Geography
- Location within Angola
- Location: Angola

Mount Moco (Portuguese: Morro do Moco), at 2,620 metres (8,600 ft), is the highest mountain in Angola. It is located in Huambo Province in the western part of the country, 70 kilometres (43 mi) west of the city of Huambo. Mount Moco was named one of Angola's "seven wonders" in 2014. The mountain is a destination for birdwatchers, hikers, and people participating in rappelling and paragliding.

== Flora and fauna ==
The mountain's Afromontane forests are part of the Angolan montane forest-grassland mosaic bioregion.

=== Flora ===
Mount Moco is largely under-researched and has been visited by very few botanical surveyors. It is known to have several species of Protea and other flowering plants, many of which appear in July through September after grassland fires have settled.

=== Birdlife ===
Mount Moco is home to many birds, with around 233 species recorded at the site. It has been designated an Important Bird Area (IBA) by BirdLife International and is part of the Western Angola Endemic Bird Area.

The mountain provides a home for a number of endangered and threatened bird species including the Swiersta's Francolin (Pternistis swierstrai), Angola Cave Chat (Xenocopsychus ansorgei), Angola Slaty Flycatcher (Dioptrornis brunneus) and Ludwig's Double-collared Sunbird (Cinnyris ludovicensis).

=== Conservation ===
Mount Moco is a particularly threatened habitat due to unsustainable wood collection for construction-based logging and for firewood. Uncontrolled bush fires are also an environmental threat. Though a Mount Moco Special Reserve has been proposed, the area currently has no protection status or measures in place.

The forest continues to be at risk from the local residents of the village of Kanjonde, which sits at the foot of Mount Moco. As they depend primarily on subsistence farming, the villagers frequently burn vegetation and fell trees to make way for food cultivation in the mountain's valleys. Kanjonde has no electricity, so the residents also depend on wood fuel for cooking.

The Mount Moco Project is a charitable foundation working to gain protection status for Mount Moco and to educate the Kanjonde villagers about more sustainable practices. The Project began a native tree nursery in July 2010 at Kanjonde, and this nursery was expanded in 2012 with permission of the village's soba (chief), Amândio Cabo.
