= Great Escarpment, Southern Africa =

Major topographical feature in Africa

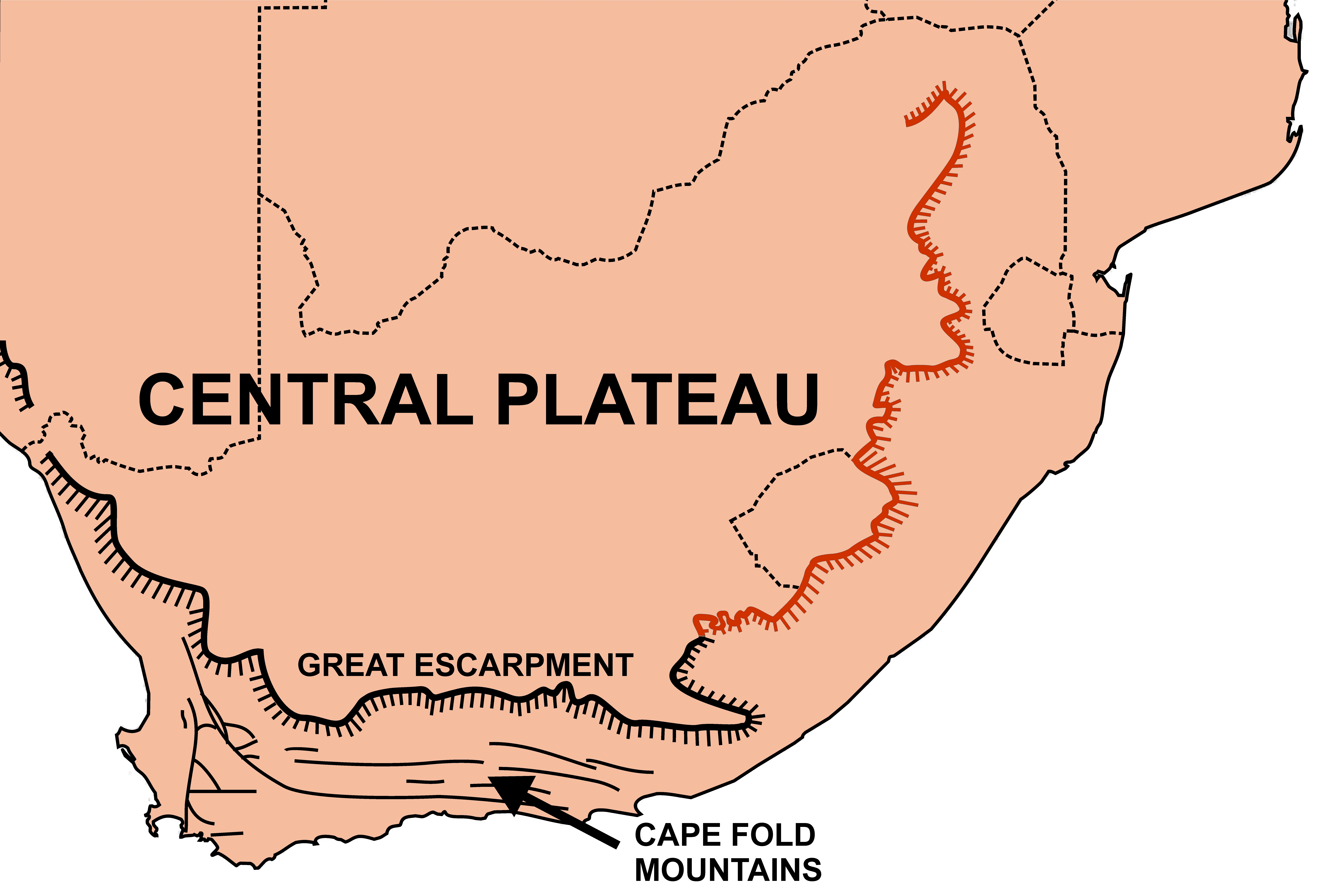
A map of South Africa shows the central plateau edged by the Great Escarpment and its relationship to the Cape Fold Mountains in the south. The portion of the Great Escarpment shown in red is officially known as the Drakensberg, although most South Africans think of the Drakensberg as only that portion of the escarpment that forms the border between KwaZulu-Natal and Lesotho. Here the escarpment rises to its greatest height of more than 3,000 metres (9,800 ft).

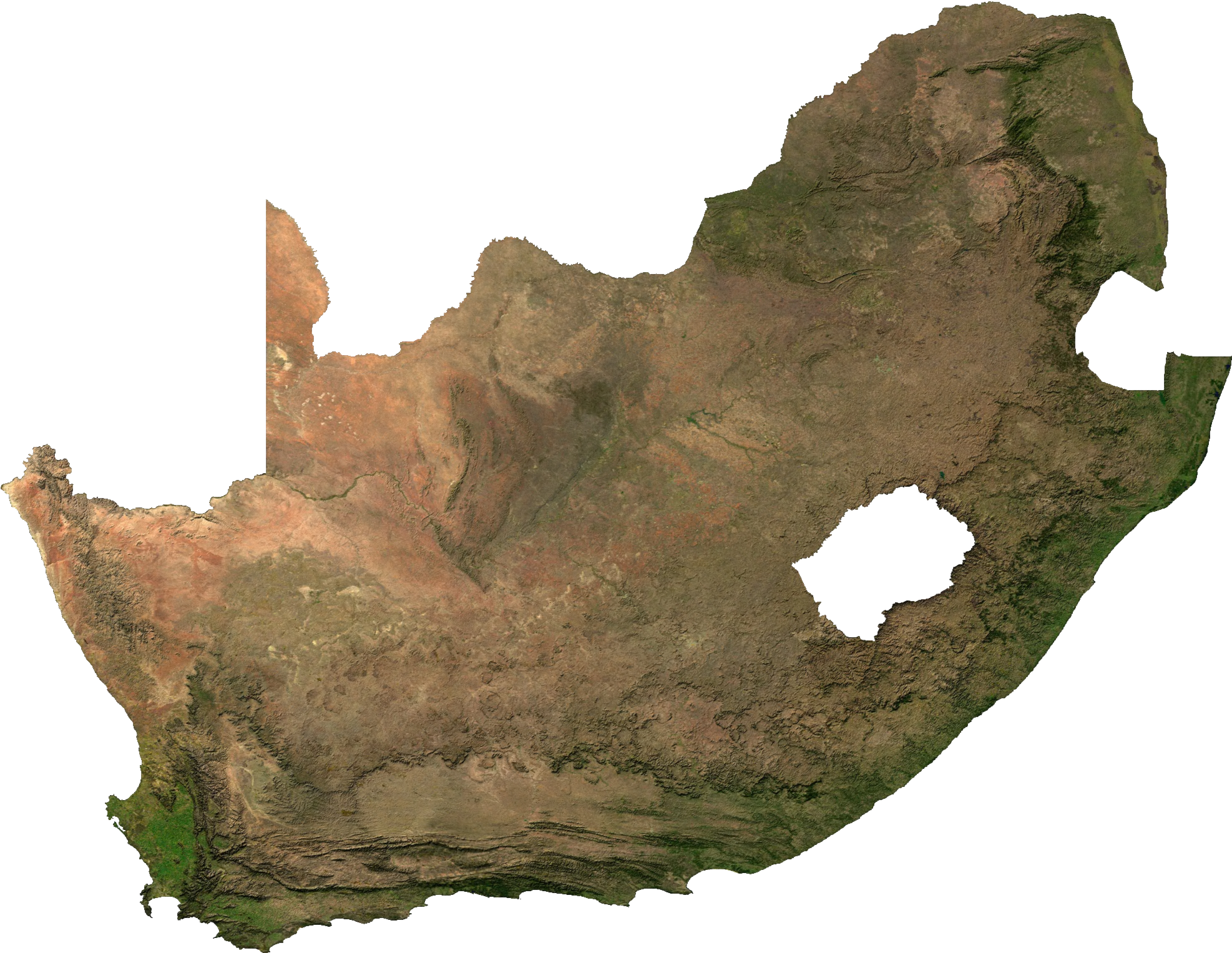
Compared to the preceding map, the Great Escarpment can be identified in this satellite image of South Africa

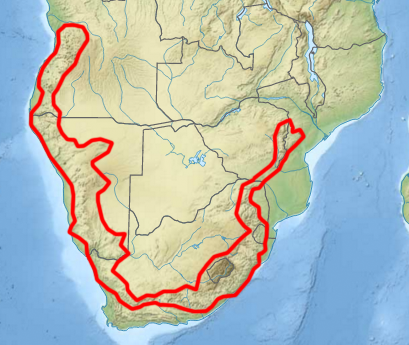
Extent of the Great Escarpment

The Great Escarpment is a major topographical feature in Africa that consists of steep slopes from the high central Southern African plateau downward in the direction of the oceans that surround southern Africa on three sides. While it lies predominantly within the borders of South Africa, in the east the escarpment extends northward to form the border between Mozambique and Zimbabwe, continuing on beyond the Zambezi river valley to form the Muchinga Escarpment in eastern Zambia. In the west, it extends northward into Namibia and Angola. It is the combination of this escarpment and the aridity of Southern Africa that leads to the lack of navigable rivers in South Africa.

Various sections of the Great Escarpment have their own names. The best-known is the Drakensberg (diagram on the right). The Schwarzrand, the edge of the Khomas Highland in Namibia, and the Serra da Chela in Angola are also well-known.

== Geological origins ==
About 180 million years ago, a mantle plume under southern Gondwana caused bulging of the continental crust in the area that would later become southern Africa. Within 10–20 million years, rift valleys formed on either side of the central bulge and flooded to become the proto-Atlantic Ocean and proto-Indian Ocean more or less along the present southern African coastline and separating the Southern Cape from the Falkland Plateau. The stepped, steep walls of these rift valleys formed escarpments that surrounded the newly formed Southern African subcontinent.

During the past 20 million years, southern Africa has experienced further massive uplifting, especially in the east, with the result that most of the plateau lies above 1,000 m (3,300 ft) despite extensive erosion. The plateau is tilted such that it is highest in the east and slopes gently downward toward the west and south. Typically, the elevation of the edge of the eastern escarpments is in excess of 2,000 m (6,600 ft). It reaches its highest point of over 3,000 m (9,800 ft) where the escarpment forms part of the international border between Lesotho and the South African province of KwaZulu-Natal.

With the widening of the Atlantic, Indian, and Southern oceans, southern Africa became tectonically quiescent. Earthquakes rarely occur in the region, and there has been no volcanic or orogenic activity for approximately 50 million years. An almost uninterrupted period of erosion continues to the present, removing layers many kilometers thick from the surface of the plateau and moving the present position of the escarpment approximately 150 kilometres (93 mi) inland from the original fault lines that formed the walls of the rift valley along the coastline during the break-up of Gondwana. Consequently, a thick layer of marine sediment was deposited onto the continental shelf (the lower steps of the original rift valley walls) that surrounds the subcontinent, creating the present-day coastal plain. The rate of the erosion of the escarpment in the Drakensberg region is said to average 1.5 m (5 ft) per 1000 years, or 1.5 millimetres (1/16 in) per year.

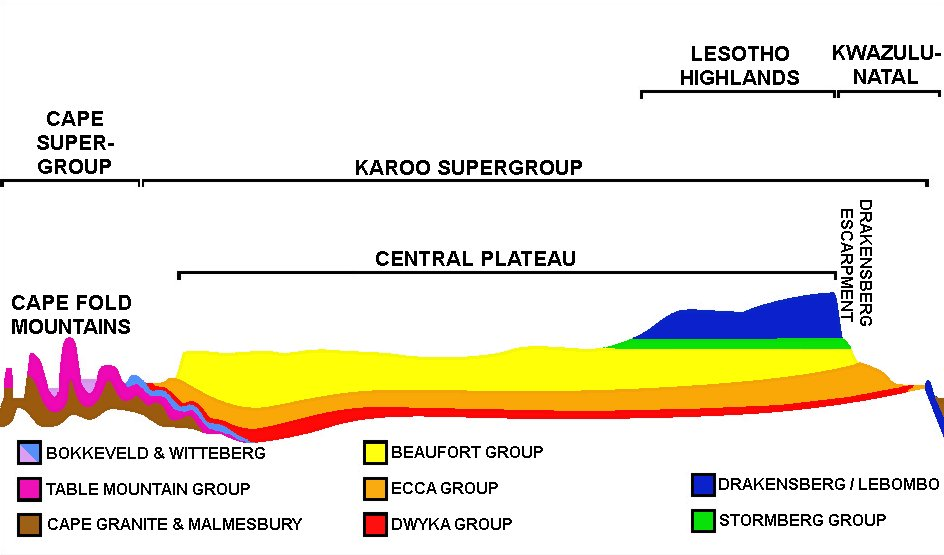
An approximate SW-NE cross section through South Africa with the Cape Peninsula (with Table Mountain) on the far left, and northeastern KwaZulu-Natal on the right is diagrammatic, and only roughly to scale. It shows the major geological structures (coloured layers) that dominate the southern and eastern parts of the country, as well as the relationship between the Central Plateau, the Cape Fold mountains, and the Drakensberg escarpment. The southwestern escarpment (the Roggeberg escarpment) is clearly visible on the left, but is not labelled. The significance and origin of the geological layers can be found under the headings "Karoo Supergroup" and "Cape Supergroup"

Because of erosion throughout most of the Mesozoic and Cenozoic eras, none of the plateau's surface rocks (except the Kalahari sands) are younger than 180 million years. The youngest rocks that remain cap the plateau in Lesotho and form the steep sides of the Great Escarpment in this region. These are the Clarens Formation laid down under desert conditions about 200 million years ago, topped by a 1,600 m (5,200 ft) thick layer of lava that erupted and covered most of southern Africa, and indeed large parts of Gondwana, approximately 180 million years ago.

Erosional retreat means that the rocks exposed on the coastal plain are, with very few and small exceptions, older than those that cap the escarpment. The rocks found in the Lowveld below the Mpumalanga portion of the Great Escarpment are more than 3 billion years old. As the escarpment retreated inland, the Cape Fold Mountains that had formed 150 million years earlier and been buried under sediments from the Himalaya-sized range of Gondwana mountains were gradually re-exposed. Being composed of erosion-resistant quartzitic sandstone, they remained as the less resistant overlying sediments were removed, ultimately to form the parallel formations that protrude from the coastal plain of the south and southwest Cape. In the main, the rocks of the KwaZulu-Natal Midlands belong to the Beaufort and Ecca Groups (of the Karoo Supergroup), aged 220–310 million years.

The eastern portion of the Great Escarpment goes as far north as Tzaneen at approximately the 22° S parallel, and from there veers west to Mokopane, where it is known as the Strydpoort Mountains. The absence of the Great Escarpment for approximately 450 km (280 mi) to the north of Tzaneen (to reappear on the border between Zimbabwe and Mozambique in the Chimanimani Mountains) is due to a failed westerly branch of the main rift that caused Antarctica to start drifting away from southern Africa during the breakup of Gondwana about 150 million years ago. The lower Limpopo River and Save River drain into the Indian Ocean through what remains of this relict incipient rift valley, which now forms part of the South African Lowveld.

== Appearance ==
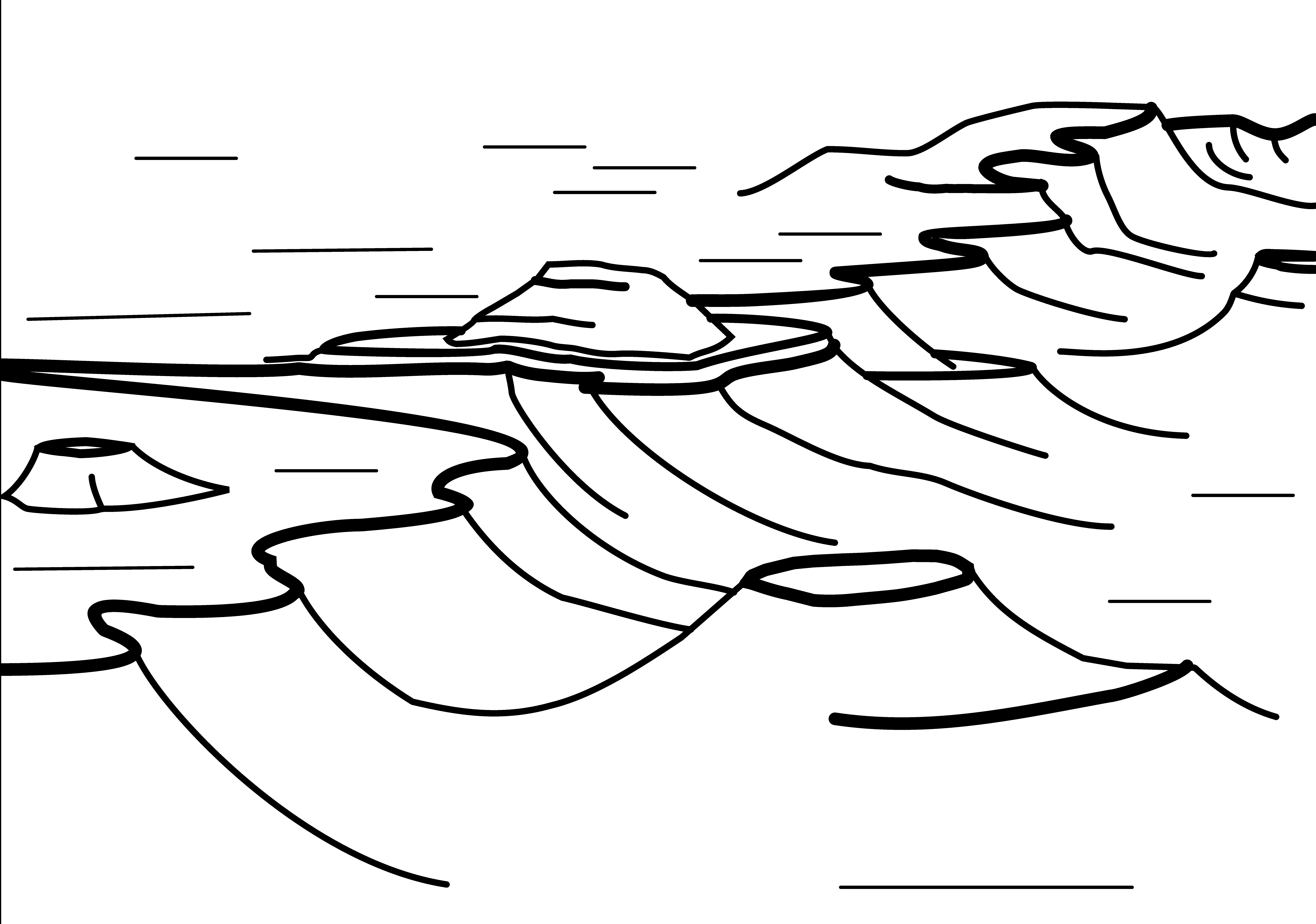
This is a stylized illustration of the Southern African Great Escarpment, based particularly on its appearance in the Great Karoo, where thick, erosion-resistant dolerite sills (represented by the thick black lines in the diagram) generally form the upper, sharp edge of the escarpment; in other parts of the escarpment, hard, erosion-resistant geological layers similarly form the upper, abrupt edge (see text); note the island remnants of the earlier extent of the plateau on the plain below the escarpment, left behind as the escarpment has gradually eroded farther inland.

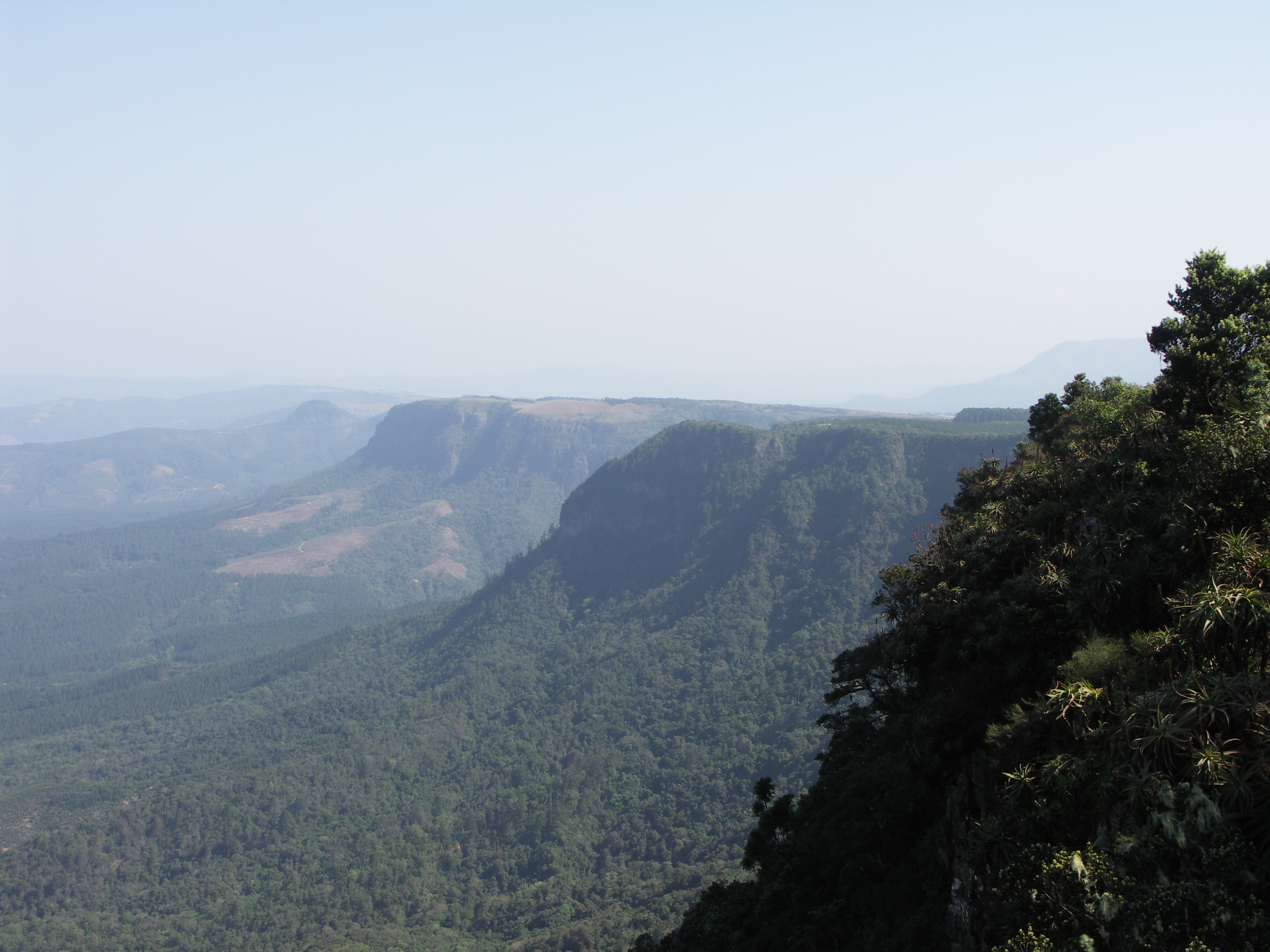
A view of the Mpumalanga Drakensberg portion of the Great Escarpment, from God's Window, near Graskop looking south, shows the hard erosion-resistant layer that forms the upper edge of the escarpment that consists of flat-lying quartzite belonging to the Black Reef Formation, which also forms the Magaliesberg mountains near Pretoria.

The eastern portion of the Great Escarpment within the borders of South Africa (see the accompanying map, above) is referred to as the Drakensberg ('Dragon Mountains'). The Limpopo, Mpumalanga, and Lesotho Drakensberg have hard, erosion-resistant upper surfaces and therefore have a very high and rugged appearance, combining steep-sided blocks and pinnacles. The KwaZulu-Natal – Free State Drakensberg escarpment is composed of softer rocks and therefore has a softer, more rounded appearance from below. Generally, the top of the Escarpment is almost table-top flat and smooth, even in Lesotho. The "Lesotho Mountains" are formed away from the Drakensberg escarpment by erosion gulleys that turn into deep valleys that contain the tributaries that flow into the Orange River. There are so many of these tributaries that it gives the Lesotho Highlands a very rugged, mountainous appearance, both from the ground and from the air.

Along the southern extent of the central plateau some of the thicker, hard, erosion-resistant dolerite sills form large parts of the upper edge of the escarpment (see the illustration at right), but where the sills are thinner or absent then, like the portion of the Drakensberg between KwaZulu-Natal – Free State, the escarpment is composed of softer rocks, aged between 250 and 300 million years old. This means that in these regions, the scarp has a more rounded appearance, or has eroded away to such an extent that the scarp may no longer be evident (for instance along the route taken by the N1 highway between Beaufort West, below the escarpment, and just beyond Three Sisters on the way to Richmond or Victoria West, on the plateau; and also where the Orange River has eroded a broad valley through the escarpment in the west before it flows into the Atlantic Ocean). Along most of its extent, however, it forms a 400–800-metre-high mountain-like ridge that roads into the interior must negotiate, sometimes up steep, winding passes, such as the Burke's, Vanrhyns, Bloukrans, Gannaga, Ouberg, Verlatekloof, Teekloof, Molteno, Goliatskraal, Daggaboersnek, Katberg, Nico Malan, and Barkly passes. Nevertheless, the escarpment to the south and west of the plateau lacks the grandeur of the Mpumalaga and Lesotho Drakensberg, on the one hand, and the extremely rugged, intricately folded ranges of Cape Fold Mountains that run parallel to the coast on the seaward side of the Great Escarpment. (The parallel ranges of mountains, to the south of the escarpment, can clearly be seen on the accompanying satellite image of South Africa, especially when compared to the diagram on the left, which shows the course of the Great Escarpment.) The fold mountains were formed about 330 million years ago, and therefore pre-date the formation of the escarpment by nearly 200 million years. The two events are geologically unrelated to one another. They also represent two very different geological processes: the Great Escarpment resulted from rifting, and the tearing apart of the Gondwana super-continent, whereas the Cape Fold Mountains resulted from the collision of tectonic plates, during the assembly of Gondwana, in the same way that the Andes Mountains in South America are being formed today.

The Cape Fold Mountains have been re-exposed by erosion of the coastal plain below the Great Escarpment (see "Geological origin", above), after having been covered by sediments originating from an even higher and more extensive range of mountains, comparable to the Himalayas, that developed during the assembly of Gondwana to the south of the present African continent, on the portion of Gondwana called the Falkland Plateau, the remnants of which are at present located far to the southwest of southern Africa, close to southern tip of South America.

== See also ==
- Cliff Ollier – Australian geologist, geomorphologist and soil scientist (born 1931)
- Lester Charles King – English geologist and geomorphologist
- Pediplain – Extensive plain formed by the coalescence of pediments
- List of escarpments
