= Lubango =

Municipality in Huila, Angola

Lubango Sá da Bandeira
- Municipality
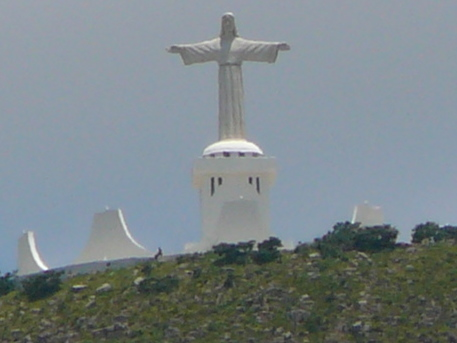
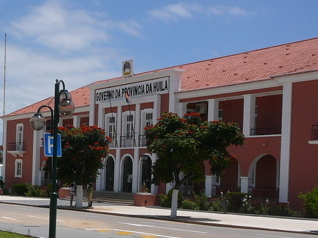
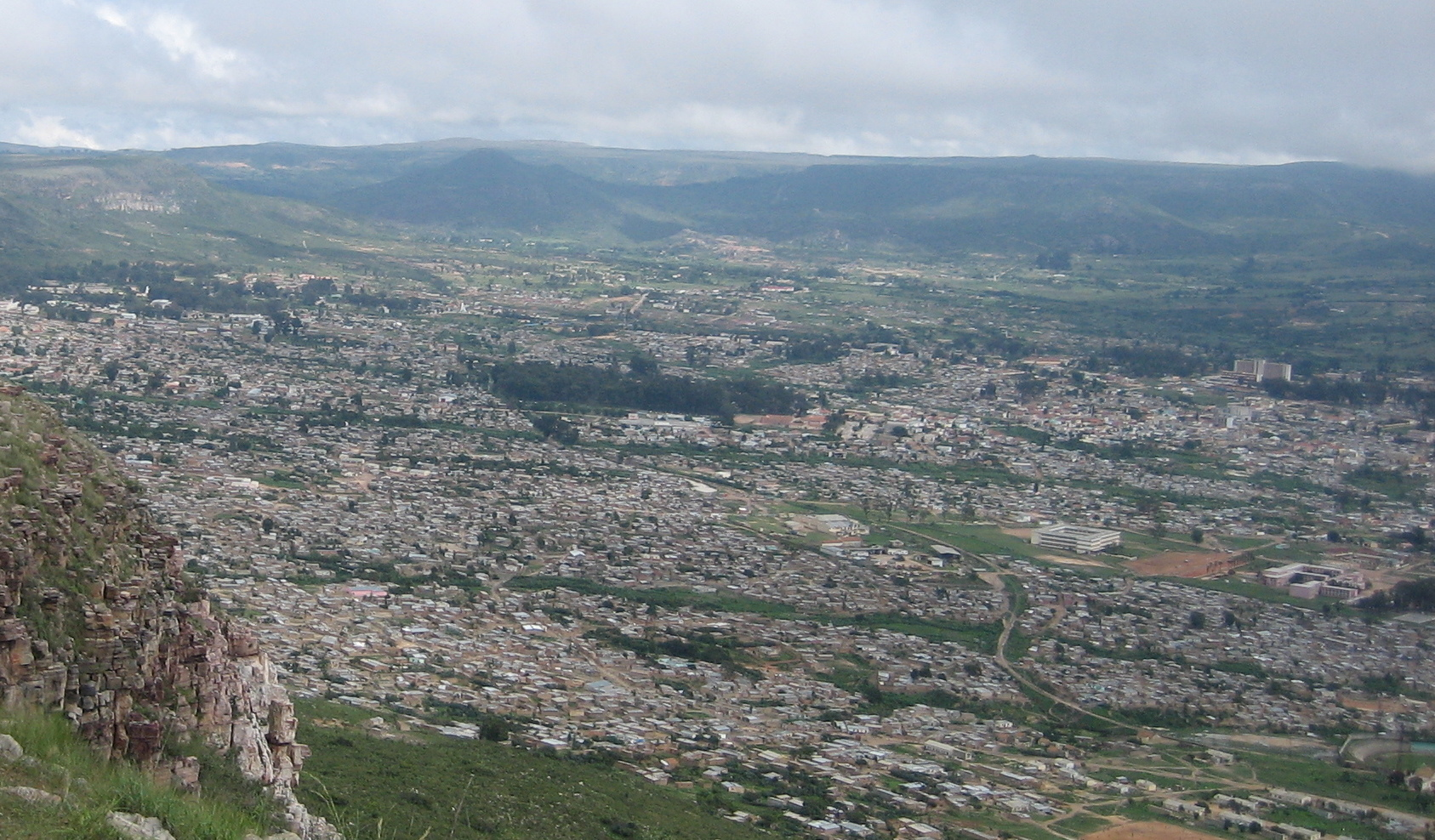

- Location in Angola
- Coordinates: 14°55′S 13°30′E
- Country: Angola
- Province: Huíla

Area
  - Total: 1,486 km^{2} (574 sq mi)
- Elevation: 1,720 m (5,640 ft)

Population (2024 Census)
  - Total: 890,384
  - Density: 599.2/km^{2} (1,552/sq mi)
- Time zone: UTC+1 (WAT)
- Climate: Cwb

Lubango, formerly known as Sá da Bandeira, is a municipality in Angola, capital of the Huíla Province, with a population of 890,384 in 2024. The city center had a population of 805,272 in 2024 making it the second-most populous city in Angola after the capital city Luanda.

== History ==
=== Portuguese rule ===
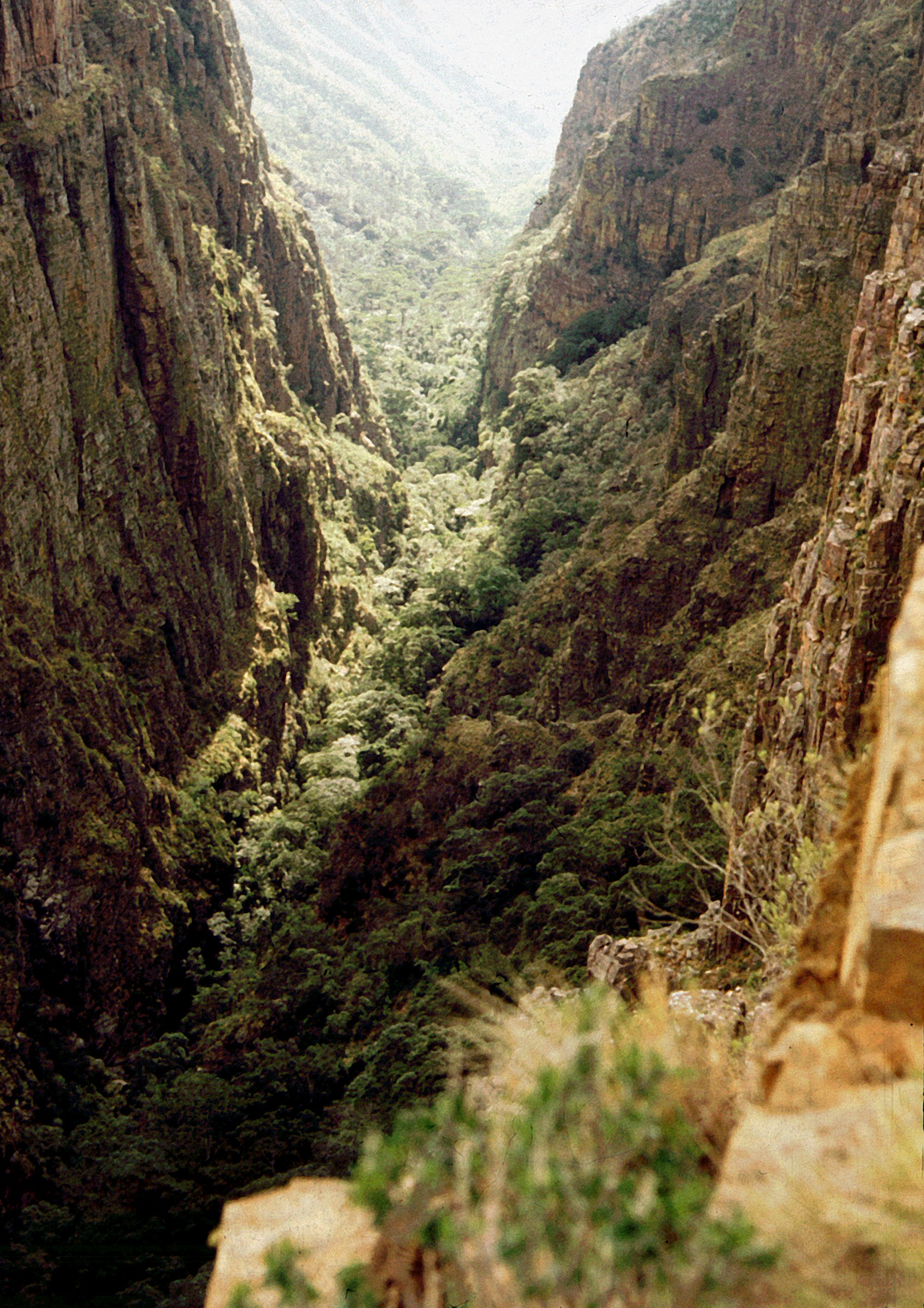
Canyon in Lubango.

In 1882 approximately one thousand Portuguese settlers came from the island of Madeira to the area of current-day Lubango. These Portuguese farmers helped develop the region and founded the settlement. The city, originally established in 1885 to serve colonists from the Madeira Islands, lies at an elevation of 1,760 metres in a valley of the Huíla Plateau and was surrounded by a scenic park spreading up the mountain slopes.

By 1910 there were over 1,700 ethnic Portuguese living in the settlement, which was referred to as "Lubango". By 1923 the Moçâmedes Railway had connected the settlement to the town of Moçâmedes in the coast. The Portuguese government made it a city and renamed it "Sá da Bandeira", after Bernardo de Sá, 1st Marquess of Sá da Bandeira. Once the major centre of Portuguese settlement, it was built in a Portuguese style of architecture, with a cathedral, commerce hall, industrial hall, and a secondary school, and, like every Portuguese city or town in the mainland and the overseas territories, it would have the Portuguese town hall, the hospital and the typical CTT post office, besides banking (most prominently the Banco Nacional Ultramarino - BNU), insurance and other services as well. The city developed as a notable agricultural and transportation centre, with its own airport and railway station, as well as major maintenance and repair facilities for them.

Several Basters (children of African and Cape Colony Dutch descent) emigrated from Namibia to Angola and settled in Lubango, where they are known as the Ouivamo. Many of them were forced to return to Namibia between 1928 and 1930 by white South Africans.

In 1951, the Portuguese colony of Angola was officially rebranded the Overseas Province of Angola.

=== Post independence ===
After Angola's Independence from Portugal due to the events of the April 25, 1974 Carnation Revolution in Lisbon, the city was once again renamed Lubango. During the Angolan Civil War (1975–2002), Lubango served as a major base of Cuban, SWAPO, and government troops. Its once-thriving economy plummeted.

== Economy ==
Lubango's economy is based on agriculture, especially meat products, cereals, sisal, tobacco, fruits, and vegetables produced in the surrounding fertile region. Food processing, leather tanning, and consumer goods industries dominate the industrial sector.

A number of Angolan banks, like BAI or BPC offer good financial services, and it is possible to receive funds from outside Angola by way of electronic fund transfer into these banks. ATMs are available around the city, but they disburse kwanza, which is the local currency. In the markets US dollars or kwanza are both acceptable.

The main shopping plaza in Lubango is a newly built Mall called "Milleneum", where most products of daily use as well as other products like cosmetics, shoes, clothes, etc. are available.

== Transport ==
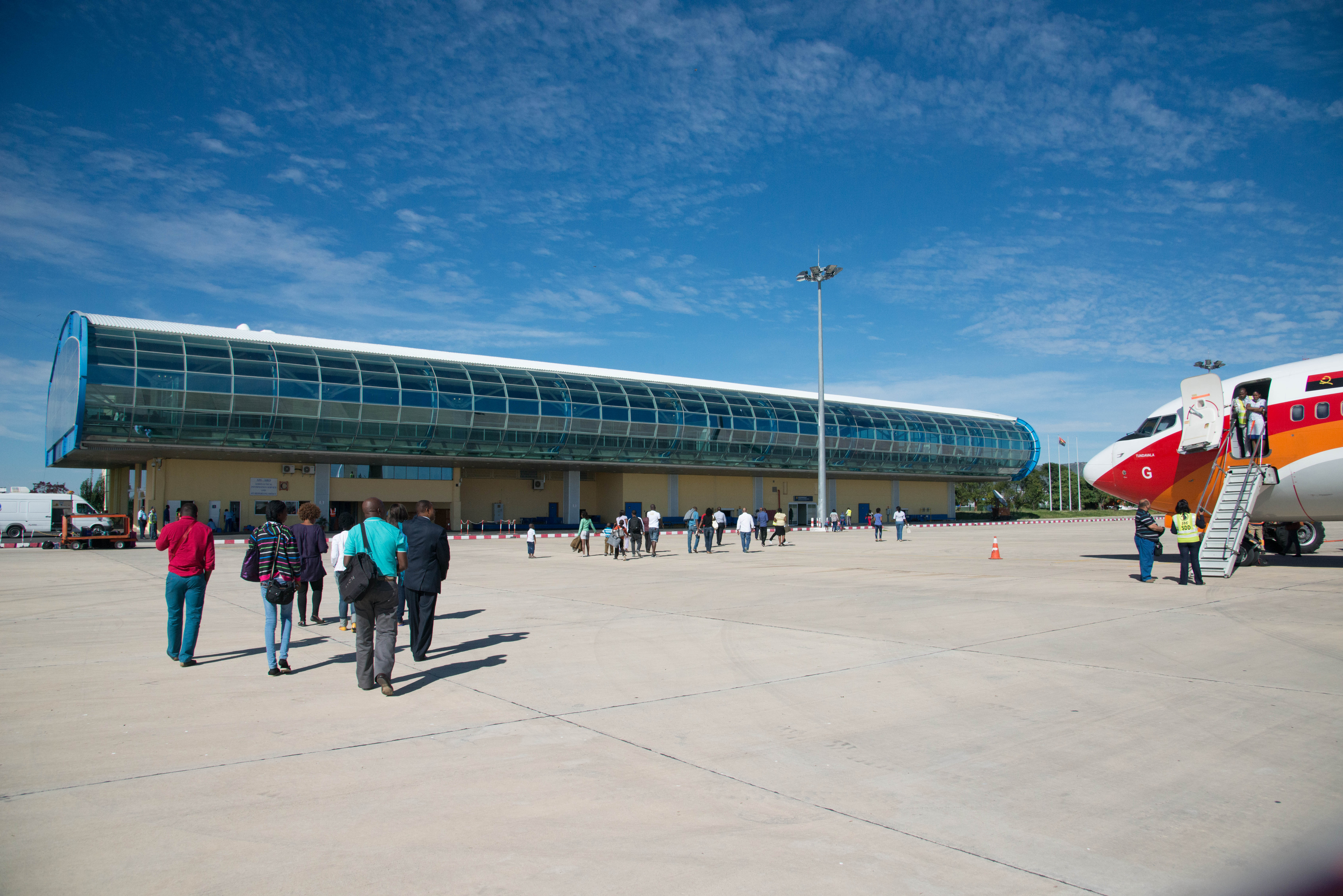
Lubango Airport.

Lubango is the site of an airport (Lubango Airport IATA code:SDD) and headquarters for a fighter bomber regiment of the Angolan Air Force. The airport receives daily flights from Luanda and thrice a week from Windhoek, Namibia through TAAG, the Angolan airline.

The town is served by the Moçâmedes Railway, known as CFM. It is the junction for the branch railway to Chiange. Also the town is serviced by taxis (mostly shared) which run in circles around the city. One can hire personal taxis which are marked "PARTICULAR". Walking around town is also a good way to explore Lubango. Bus services are available from Lubito and the buses run by a firm called "SGO" are pretty comfortable.

== Education and science ==
Lubango is home to two public higher education institutions, namely the Mandume ya Ndemufayo University and the Higher Institute of Education Sciences of Huíla.

The town has a Portuguese international school, the Escola Portuguesa do Lubango (Portuguese School of Lubango), and the Instituto Superior Politécnico Gregório Semedo (Gregório Semedo Polytechnical Institute) that offers degree courses in various disciplines.

== Climate ==
With an altitude of 1,760 metres (5,774 ft) above sea level, Lubango is one of the highest places in Angola. The city features a subtropical highland climate (Cwb) under the Köppen climate classification. The climate is hot and humid during the day and cool to cold at night. The annual average temperature is 18.6 °C (65.5 °F), though there are extremes of 0 to 34.4 °C (32.0 to 93.9 °F). June and July are cold when frosts are possible, albeit rare. The heaviest rains are between December and March, and the warmest months are September and October.

Climate data for Lubango (1931–1960)
Month	Jan	Feb	Mar	Apr	May	Jun	Jul	Aug	Sep	Oct	Nov	Dec	Year
Record high °C (°F)	30.1 (86.2)	30.7 (87.3)	30.1 (86.2)	29.1 (84.4)	29.8 (85.6)	28.1 (82.6)	27.7 (81.9)	30.1 (86.2)	31.4 (88.5)	34.4 (93.9)	32.0 (89.6)	31.1 (88.0)	34.4 (93.9)
Mean daily maximum °C (°F)	25.0 (77.0)	24.6 (76.3)	24.6 (76.3)	24.9 (76.8)	24.8 (76.6)	23.6 (74.5)	24.2 (75.6)	26.2 (79.2)	28.2 (82.8)	28.0 (82.4)	26.3 (79.3)	25.3 (77.5)	25.5 (77.9)
Daily mean °C (°F)	19.0 (66.2)	18.8 (65.8)	18.8 (65.8)	18.7 (65.7)	17.3 (63.1)	15.8 (60.4)	16.2 (61.2)	18.6 (65.5)	20.8 (69.4)	20.7 (69.3)	19.8 (67.6)	19.2 (66.6)	18.6 (65.5)
Mean daily minimum °C (°F)	13.1 (55.6)	12.9 (55.2)	13.0 (55.4)	12.5 (54.5)	9.8 (49.6)	7.9 (46.2)	8.3 (46.9)	11.0 (51.8)	13.4 (56.1)	13.4 (56.1)	13.2 (55.8)	13.2 (55.8)	11.8 (53.2)
Record low °C (°F)	5.3 (41.5)	5.4 (41.7)	2.0 (35.6)	3.2 (37.8)	0.6 (33.1)	−1.0 (30.2)	−1.0 (30.2)	0.0 (32.0)	4.6 (40.3)	4.1 (39.4)	5.1 (41.2)	3.9 (39.0)	−1.0 (30.2)
Average precipitation mm (inches)	139.7 (5.50)	152.8 (6.02)	171.6 (6.76)	93.5 (3.68)	5.5 (0.22)	0.1 (0.00)	0.0 (0.0)	0.4 (0.02)	4.3 (0.17)	70.4 (2.77)	118.0 (4.65)	152.6 (6.01)	909.0 (35.79)
Average precipitation days (≥ 0.1 mm)	15	14	17	10	1	0	0	0	2	10	14	17	100
Average relative humidity (%)	65	67	69	63	47	40	34	30	33	49	59	63	52
Mean monthly sunshine hours	164.3	163.9	173.6	204.0	272.8	285.0	282.1	282.1	240.0	213.9	207.0	201.5	2,690.2
Mean daily sunshine hours	5.3	5.8	5.6	6.8	8.8	9.5	9.1	9.1	8.0	6.9	6.9	6.5	7.4
Source: Deutscher Wetterdienst

The city is regarded as the coldest city in Angola, with registered temperatures of −2 °C (28 °F).

== Notable citizens ==
- Marco Abreu (born 8 December 1974), footballer and member of the Angola national football team.

== See also ==
- Railway stations in Angola
