= Economy of Angola =

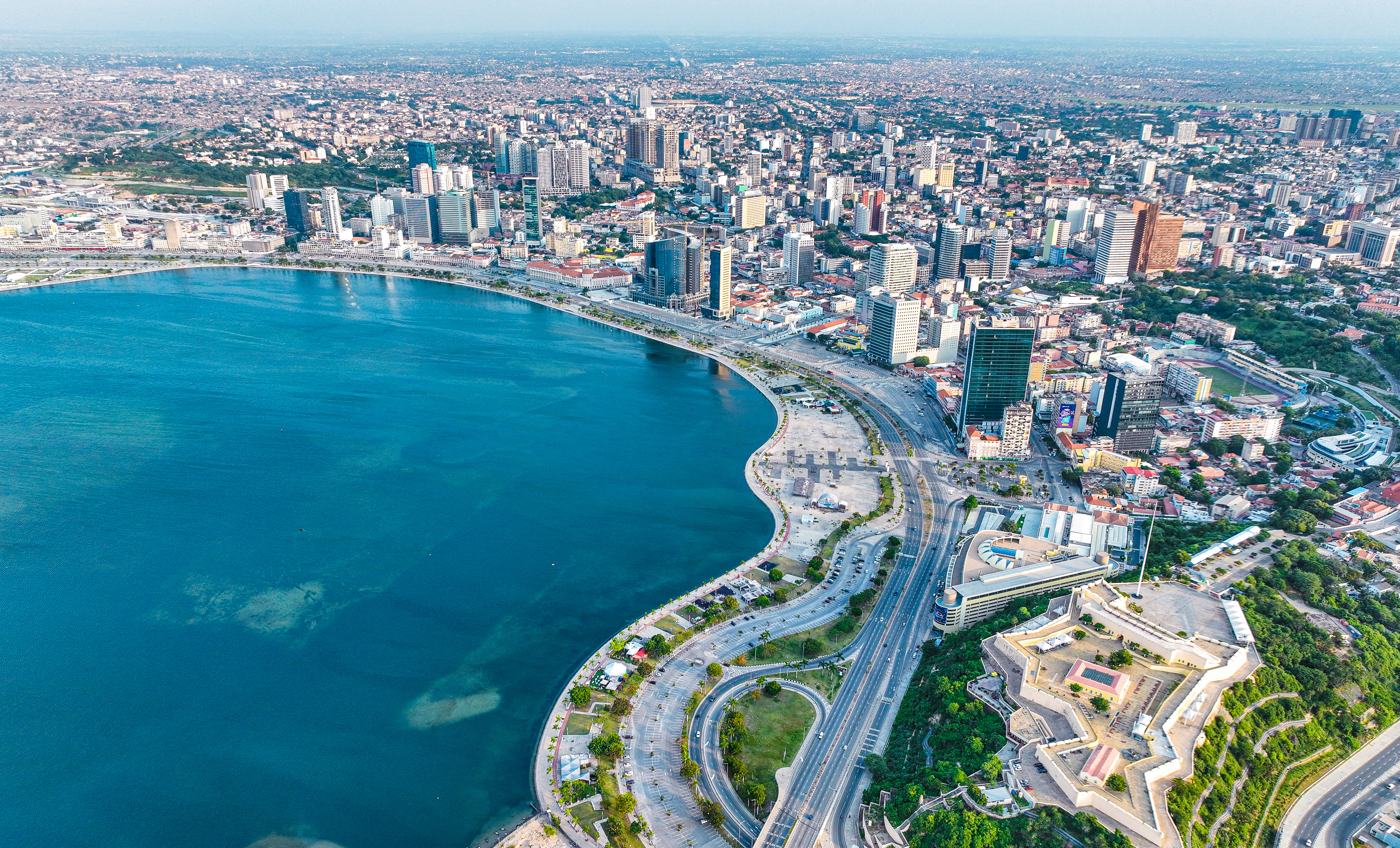
- Luanda, the financial center of Angola
- Currency: Angolan kwanza (AOA, Kz)
- Fiscal year: Calendar year
- Trade organisations: AU, AfCFTA (signed), African Development Bank, SADC, ECCAS, World Bank, IMF, WTO, Group of 77
- Country group: Least developed; Lower-middle income economy

Statistics
- Population: 36,604,681 (2025)
- GDP: ▼$152billion (nominal;2026); ▲$417.19 billion (PPP;2026)
- GDP rank: 68th (nominal; 2026); 58th (PPP; 2025)
- GDP growth: 2.1% (2025); 2.1% (2026)
- GDP per capita: ▼$4100 (nominal; 2026); ▲$10,260 (PPP; 2026)
- GDP per capita rank: 143rd (nominal; 2025); 128th (PPP; 2025)
- GDP per capita growth: 0.1% (2025)
- GDP by sector: agriculture: 14.9%; industry: 45.3%; services: 39.7%; (2023 est.)
- Inflation (CPI): 28% (2024 est.)
- Population below national poverty line: 32.3% (2018 est.); 53% on less than $3.65/day (2018)
- Gini coefficient: 51.3 high (2018)
- Human Development Index: ▲0.616 medium (2023) (148th); ▼0.360 low IHDI (2023)
- Labour force: ▲15,315,118 (2023); 64.3% employment rate (2021)
- Labour force by occupation: agriculture: 85%; industry: 15% (2015 est.); industry and services: 15% (2003 est.)
- Unemployment: 14.62% (2023 est.)
- Informal employment: 94.1% (2025)
- Main industries: petroleum; diamonds, iron ore, phosphates, feldspar, bauxite, uranium, and gold; cement; basic metal products; fish processing; food processing, brewing, tobacco products, sugar; textiles; ship repair

External
- Exports: ▲$36.961 billion (2023 est.)
- Export goods: crude petroleum, natural gas, diamonds, ships, refined petroleum
- Main export partners: China 40.1%; European Union 21.7%; India 9.1%; United Arab Emirates 6.5%; United States 3%; Republic of the Congo 2.9%; Indonesia 2.5%; Thailand 1.9%; (2023)
- Imports: ▲$23.676 billion (2023 est.)
- Import goods: refined petroleum, wheat, cars, poultry, palm oil
- Main import partners: European Union 27.5%; China 19.4%; United Arab Emirates 6.5%; India 6%; United States 5.1%; Togo 5%; United Kingdom 4.3%; South Korea 3.9%; (2023)
- FDI stock: ▲$11.21 billion (December 31, 2017, est.); ▲ Abroad: $28 billion (December 31, 2017, est.)
- Current account: ▼$4.21 billion (2023 est.)
- Gross external debt: ▲$46.549 billion (2022 est.)

Public finance
- Government debt: ▼65% of GDP (2017 est.)
- Foreign reserves: ▲$13.942 billion (2023 est.)
- Budget balance: −6.7% (of GDP) (2017 est.)
- Revenue: 26.1 billion (2023 est.)
- Spending: 23.98 billion (2023 est.)
- Economic aid: $383.5 million (1999 est.)
- All values, unless otherwise stated, are in US dollars.

Change in per capita GDP of Angola, 1950–2018. Figures are inflation-adjusted to 2011 International dollars.

Angola has a semi-planned economy, in which central planning directs the economy with the participation of private enterprises. The economy remains heavily influenced by the effects of four decades of conflict in the last part of the 20th century, the war for independence from Portugal (1961–75) and the subsequent civil war (1975–2002). Poverty since 2002 is reduced over 50% and a third of the population relies on subsistence agriculture. Since 2002, when the 27-year civil war ended, government policy prioritized the repair and improvement of infrastructure and strengthening of political and social institutions. During the first decade of the 21st century, Angola's economy was one of the fastest-growing in the world, with reported annual average GDP growth of 11.1 percent from 2001 to 2010. High international oil prices and rising oil production contributed to strong economic growth, although with high inequality, at that time. 2022 trade surplus was $30 billion, compared to $48 billion in 2012.

Corruption is rife throughout the economy and the country remains heavily dependent on the oil sector, which in 2017 accounted for over 90 percent of exports by value and 64 percent of government revenue. With the end of the oil boom, from 2015 Angola entered into a period of economic contraction.

== History ==
The Angolan economy has been dominated by the production of raw materials and the use of cheap labor since European rule began in the sixteenth century. The Portuguese used Angola principally as a source for the thriving slave trade across the Atlantic; Luanda became the greatest slaving port in Africa. After the Portuguese Empire abolished the slave trade in Angola in 1858, it began using concessional agreements, granting exclusive rights to a private company to exploit land, people, and all other resources within a given territory. In Mozambique, this policy spawned a number of companies notorious for their exploitation of local labor. But in Angola, only Diamang showed even moderate success. At the same time, Portuguese began emigrating to Angola to establish farms and plantations (fazendas) to grow cash crops for export. Although these farms were only partially successful before World War II, they formed the basis for the later economic growth.

The principal exports of the post-slave economy in the 19th century were rubber, beeswax, and ivory. Prior to the First World War, exportation of coffee, palm kernels and oil, cattle, leather and hides, and salt fish joined the principal exports, with small quantities of gold and cotton also being produced. Grains, sugar, and rum were also produced for local consumption. The principal imports were foodstuffs, cotton goods, hardware, and British coal. Legislation against foreign traders was implemented in the 1890s. The territory's prosperity, however, continued to depend on plantations worked by labor "indentured" from the interior.

Before World War II, the Portuguese government was concerned primarily with keeping its colonies self-sufficient and therefore invested little capital in Angola's local economy. It built no roads until the mid-1920s, and the first railroad, the Benguela railway, was not completed until 1929. Between 1900 and 1940, only 35,000 Portuguese emigrants settled in Angola, and most worked in commerce in the cities, facilitating trade with Portugal. In the rural areas, Portuguese settlers often found it difficult to make a living because of fluctuating world prices for sugarcane and sisal and the difficulties in obtaining cheap labor to farm their crops. As a result, they often suspended their operations until the market prices rose and instead marketed the produce of Angolan farmers.

In the wake of World War II, the rapid growth of industrialization worldwide and the parallel requirements for raw materials led Portugal to develop closer ties with its colonies and to begin actively developing the Angolan economy. In the 1930s, Portugal started to develop closer trade ties with its colonies, and by 1940 it absorbed 63 percent of Angolan exports and accounted for 47 percent of Angolan imports, up from 39 percent and 37 percent, respectively, a decade earlier. When the price of Angola's principal crops—coffee and sisal—jumped after the war, the Portuguese government began to reinvest some profits inside the country, initiating a series of projects to develop infrastructure. During the 1950s, Portugal built dams, hydroelectric power stations, and transportation systems. In addition, Portuguese citizens were encouraged to emigrate to Angola, where planned settlements (colonatos) were established for them in the rural areas. Finally, the Portuguese initiated mining operations for iron ore, manganese, and copper to complement industrial activities at home, and in 1955 the first successful oil wells were drilled in Angola. By 1960 the Angolan economy had been completely transformed, boasting a successful commercial agricultural sector, a promising mineral and petroleum production enterprise, and an incipient manufacturing industry.

Yet by 1976, these encouraging developments had been reversed. The economy was in complete disarray in the aftermath of the war of independence and the subsequent internal fighting of the liberation movements. According to the ruling MPLA-PT, in August 1976 more than 80 percent of the agricultural plantations had been abandoned by their Portuguese owners; only 284 out of 692 factories continued to operate; more than 30,000 medium-level and high-level managers, technicians, and skilled workers had left the country; and 2,500 enterprises had been closed (75 percent of which had been abandoned by their owners). Furthermore, only 8,000 vehicles remained out of 153,000 registered, dozens of bridges had been destroyed, the trading network was disrupted, administrative services did not exist, and files and studies were missing.

Angola's economic ills can also be traced to the legacy of Portuguese colonial development. Many of the white settlers had come to Angola after 1950 and were understandably quick to repatriate during the war of independence. During their stay, however, these settlers had appropriated Angolan lands, disrupting local peasant production of cash and subsistence crops. Moreover, Angola's industries depended on trade with Portugal—the colony's overwhelmingly dominant trade partner—for both markets and machinery. Only the petroleum and diamond industries boasted a wider clientele for investment and markets. Most important, the Portuguese had not trained Angolans to operate the larger industrial or agricultural enterprises, nor had they actively educated the population. Upon independence Angola thus found itself without markets or expertise to maintain even minimal economic growth.

As a result, the government intervened, nationalizing most businesses and farms abandoned by the Portuguese. It established state farms to continue producing coffee, sugar, and sisal, and it took over the operations of all factories to maintain production. These attempts usually failed, primarily because of the lack of experienced managers and the continuing disruptions in rural areas caused by the UNITA insurgency. Only the petroleum sector continued to operate successfully, and by 1980 this sector had helped the gross domestic product reach US$3.6 billion, its highest level up to 1988. In the face of serious economic problems and the continuing war throughout the countryside, in 1987 the government announced plans to liberalize economic policies and promote private investment and involvement in the economy.

=== 1990s ===
United Nations Angola Verification Mission III and MONUA spent US$1.5 billion overseeing implementation of the Lusaka Protocol, a 1994 peace accord that ultimately failed to end the civil war. The protocol prohibited UNITA from buying foreign arms, a provision the United Nations largely did not enforce, so both sides continued to build up their stockpile. UNITA purchased weapons in 1996 and 1997 from private sources in Albania and Bulgaria, and from Zaire, South Africa, Republic of the Congo, Zambia, Togo, and Burkina Faso. In October 1997 the UN imposed travel sanctions on UNITA leaders, but the UN waited until July 1998 to limit UNITA's exportation of diamonds and freeze UNITA bank accounts. While the U.S. government gave US$250 million to UNITA between 1986 and 1991, UNITA made US$1.72 billion between 1994 and 1999 exporting diamonds, primarily through Zaire to Europe. At the same time the Angolan government received large amounts of weapons from the governments of Belarus, Brazil, Bulgaria, China, and South Africa. While no arms shipment to the government violated the protocol, no country informed the U.N. Register on Conventional Weapons as required.

Despite the increase in civil warfare in late 1998, the economy grew by an estimated 4% in 1999. The government introduced new currency denominations in 1999, including a 1 and 5 kwanza note."Central Bank governor explains arrangements for new currency". BBC Selected Transcripts: Africa. November 1, 1999.

=== 21st century ===
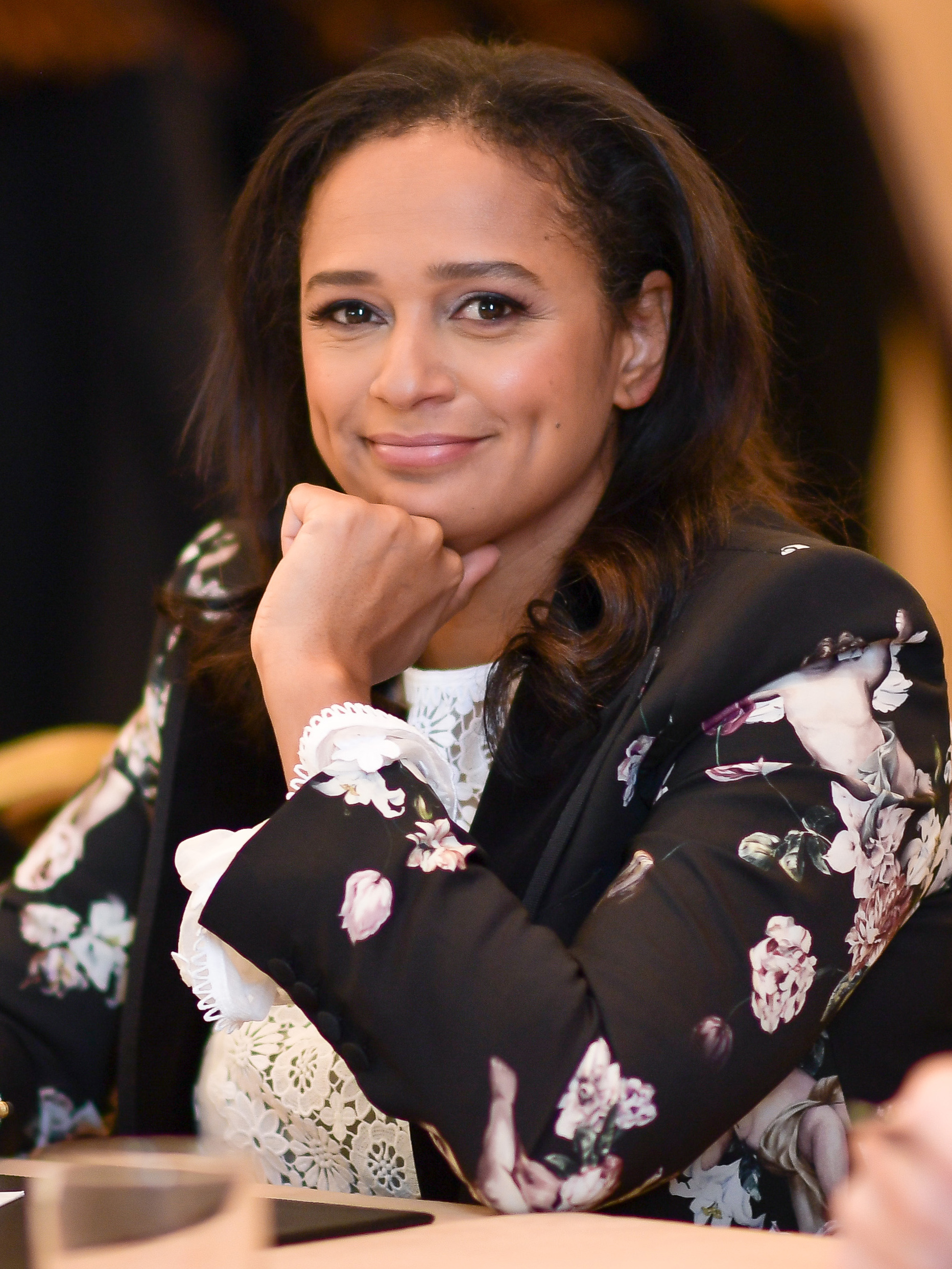
The Angolan government has been trying to prosecute Isabel dos Santos, a daughter of a former Angolan president, for corruption which may have led to Angola's recession

An economic reform effort was launched in 1998. Angola ranked 160 of 174 nations in the United Nations Human Development Index in 2000. In April 2000 Angola started an International Monetary Fund (IMF) Staff-Monitored Program (SMP). The program formally lapsed in June 2001, but the IMF remains engaged. In this context the Government of Angola has succeeded in unifying exchange rates and has raised fuel, electricity, and water rates. The Commercial Code, telecommunications law, and Foreign Investment Code are being modernized. A privatization effort, prepared with World Bank assistance, has begun with the BCI bank. Nevertheless, a legacy of fiscal mismanagement and corruption persists. The civil war internally displaced 3.8 million people, 32% of the population, by 2001. The security brought about by the 2002 peace settlement has led to the resettlement of 4 million displaced persons, thus resulting in large-scale increases in agriculture production.

Angola produced over 3 million carats (600 kilograms) of diamonds in 2003, and production was expected to grow to 10 million carats (2,000 kilograms) per year by 2007. In 2004, China's Eximbank approved a $2 billion line of credit to Angola to rebuild infrastructure. The economy grew 18% in 2005 and growth was expected to reach 26% in 2006 and stay above 10% for the rest of the decade. By 2020, Angola had a national debt of $76 billion, of which $20 billion is to China.

The construction industry is taking advantage of the growing economy, with various housing projects stimulated by the government such as the Angola Investe program and the Casa Feliz or Meña projects. Not all public construction projects are functional. For example, Kilamba Kiaxi, where a whole new satellite town of Luanda, consisting of housing facilities for several hundreds of thousands of people, was completely uninhabited for over four years because of skyrocketing prices, but completely sold out after the government decreased the original price and created mortgage plans at around the election time and thus made it affordable for middle-class people. ChevronTexaco started pumping 50 kbbl/d (7.9×10^{3} m^{3}/d) from Block 14 in January 2000, but production decreased to 57 kbbl/d (9.1×10^{3} m^{3}/d) in 2007 due to poor-quality oil. Cabinda Gulf Oil Company found Malange-1, an oil reservoir in Block 14, on August 9, 2007.

== Overview ==
Despite its abundant natural resources, output per capita is among the world's lowest. Subsistence agriculture provides the main livelihood for 85% of the population. Oil production and the supporting activities are vital to the economy, contributing about 45% to GDP and 90% of exports. Growth is almost entirely driven by rising oil production which surpassed 1.4 million barrels per day (220×10^{3} m^{3}/d) in late-2005 and which is expected to grow to 2 million barrels per day (320×10^{3} m^{3}/d) by 2007. Control of the oil industry is consolidated in Sonangol Group, a conglomerate owned by the Angolan government. With revenues booming from oil exports, the government has started to implement ambitious development programs to build roads and other basic infrastructure for the nation.

In the last decade of the colonial period, Angola was a major African food exporter but now imports almost all its food. Severe wartime conditions, including extensive planting of landmines throughout the countryside, have brought agricultural activities to a near-standstill. Some efforts to recover have gone forward, however, notably in fisheries. Coffee production, though a fraction of its pre-1975 level, is sufficient for domestic needs and some exports. Expanding oil production is now almost half of GDP and 90% of exports, at 800 thousand barrels per day (130×10^{3} m^{3}/d). Diamonds provided much of the revenue for Jonas Savimbi's UNITA rebellion through illicit trade. Other rich resources await development: gold, forest products, fisheries, iron ore, coffee, and fruits.

This is a chart of trend of nominal gross domestic product of Angola at market prices using International Monetary Fund data; figures are in millions of units.

Year	Gross Domestic Product (*$1,000,000)	US Dollar Exchange	Per Capita Income (as % of USA)
1980			6.33
1985			4.46
1990			4.42
1995	5,066	14 Angolan Kwanza	1.58
2000	9,135	91,666 Angolan Kwanza	1.96
2005	28,860	2,515,452 Angolan Kwanza	4.73

The following table shows the main economic indicators in 1980–2026, including historical data and estimates through 2025 and IMF projections for 2026. Inflation below 5% is in green.

Year	GDP (in bn. US$ PPP)	GDP per capita (in US$ PPP)	GDP (in bn. US$ nominal)	GDP growth (real)	Inflation rate (in Percent)	Government debt (in % of GDP)
1980	12.7	1,560	8.7	▲2.4%	▲46.7%	n/a
1981	▲13.3	▲1,589	▼8.2	▼−4.4%	▲1.4%	n/a
1982	▲14.1	▲1,644	8.2	0.0%	▲1.8%	n/a
1983	▲15.3	▲1,734	▲8.5	▲4.2%	▲1.8%	n/a
1984	▲16.8	▲1,856	▲9.0	▲6.0%	▲1.8%	n/a
1985	▲17.9	▼1,758	▲11.1	▲3.5%	▲1.8%	n/a
1986	▲18.8	▲1,795	▼10.4	▲2.9%	▲1.8%	n/a
1987	▲20.0	▲1,866	▲11.9	▲4.1%	▲1.8%	n/a
1988	▲22.0	▲1,997	▲12.9	▲6.1%	▲1.8%	n/a
1989	▲22.9	▲2,020	▲15.0	0.0%	▲1.8%	n/a
1990	▲22.9	▼1,971	▲16.5	▼−3.5%	▲1.8%	n/a
1991	▲26.6	▲2,208	▼16.0	▲12.1%	▲85.3%	n/a
1992	▲30.3	▲2,435	▼12.4	▲11.4%	▲299.1%	n/a
1993	▲34.4	▲2,679	▼9.0	▲11.0%	▲1,379.5%	n/a
1994	▲38.8	▲2,928	▼6.5	▲10.5%	▲949.8%	n/a
1995	▲43.7	▲3,191	▲8.1	▲10.4%	▲2,672.2%	n/a
1996	▲49.5	▲3,493	▲10.5	▲11.2%	▲4,146.0%	n/a
1997	▲54.0	▲3,685	▲12.3	▲7.3%	▲221.5%	n/a
1998	▲57.2	▲3,772	▼10.5	▲4.7%	▲107.4%	n/a
1999	▲59.3	▲3,782	▼9.9	▲2.2%	▲248.2%	n/a
2000	▲62.5	▲3,856	▲12.6	▲3.1%	▲325.0%	118.2%
2001	▲66.5	▲3,974	▼12.4	▲4.2%	▲152.6%	▼100.2%
2002	▲76.8	▲4,433	▲17.3	▲13.7%	▲108.9%	▼65.1%
2003	▲81.1	▲4,518	▲20.3	▲3.5%	▲98.2%	▼50.8%
2004	▲92.8	▲4,987	▲27.0	▲11.4%	▲43.5%	▼41.6%
2005	▲109.2	▲5,660	▲41.4	▲14.1%	▲23.0%	▼29.9%
2006	▲125.9	▲6,290	▲58.7	▲11.8%	▲13.3%	▼16.7%
2007	▲146.1	▲7,032	▲73.0	▲13.0%	▲12.2%	▲18.8%
2008	▲165.0	▲7,646	▲98.8	▲10.8%	▲12.5%	▲28.1%
2009	▲169.3	▼7,555	▼81.7	▲2.0%	▲13.7%	▲48.4%
2010	▲180.5	▲7,747	▲95.5	▲5.3%	▲14.5%	▼32.6%
2011	▲190.8	▲7,878	▲125.6	▲3.6%	▲13.5%	▼26.3%
2012	▲210.9	▲8,375	▲143.6	▲8.5%	▲10.3%	▼23.8%
2013	▲224.9	▲8,596	▲153.8	▲4.9%	▲8.8%	▲29.5%
2014	▲239.5	▲8,818	▲164.4	▲4.7%	▲7.3%	▲35.3%
2015	▲243.6	▼8,650	▼131.7	▲0.8%	▲9.2%	▲50.4%
2016	▼241.7	▼8,282	▼116.5	▼−1.7%	▲30.7%	▲65.7%
2017	▲245.7	▼8,126	▲141.9	▼−0.1%	▲29.8%	▼59.6%
2018	▲262.0	▲8,370	▼115.5	▼−0.6%	▲19.6%	▲81.6%
2019	▲279.1	▲8,622	▼95.2	▼−0.2%	▲17.1%	▲100.8%
2020	▼260.3	▼7,782	▼66.1	▼−4.0%	▲22.3%	▲119.8%
2021	▲301.1	▲8,720	▲83.0	▲2.1%	▲25.8%	▼75.5%
2022	▲336.2	▲9,433	▲139.2	▲4.2%	▲21.4%	▼57.4%
2023	▲353.2	▲9,611	▼113.1	▲1.3%	▲13.6%	▲75.7%
2024	▲379.9	▲10,027	▲119.6	▲5.0%	▲28.2%	▼57.1%
2025	▲402.9	▲10,275	▲141.7	▲3.1%	▲20.2%	▼51.3%
2026	▲424.0	▲10,446	▲152.4	▲2.3%	▲12.9%	▲51.6%

== Resources ==
=== Petroleum ===
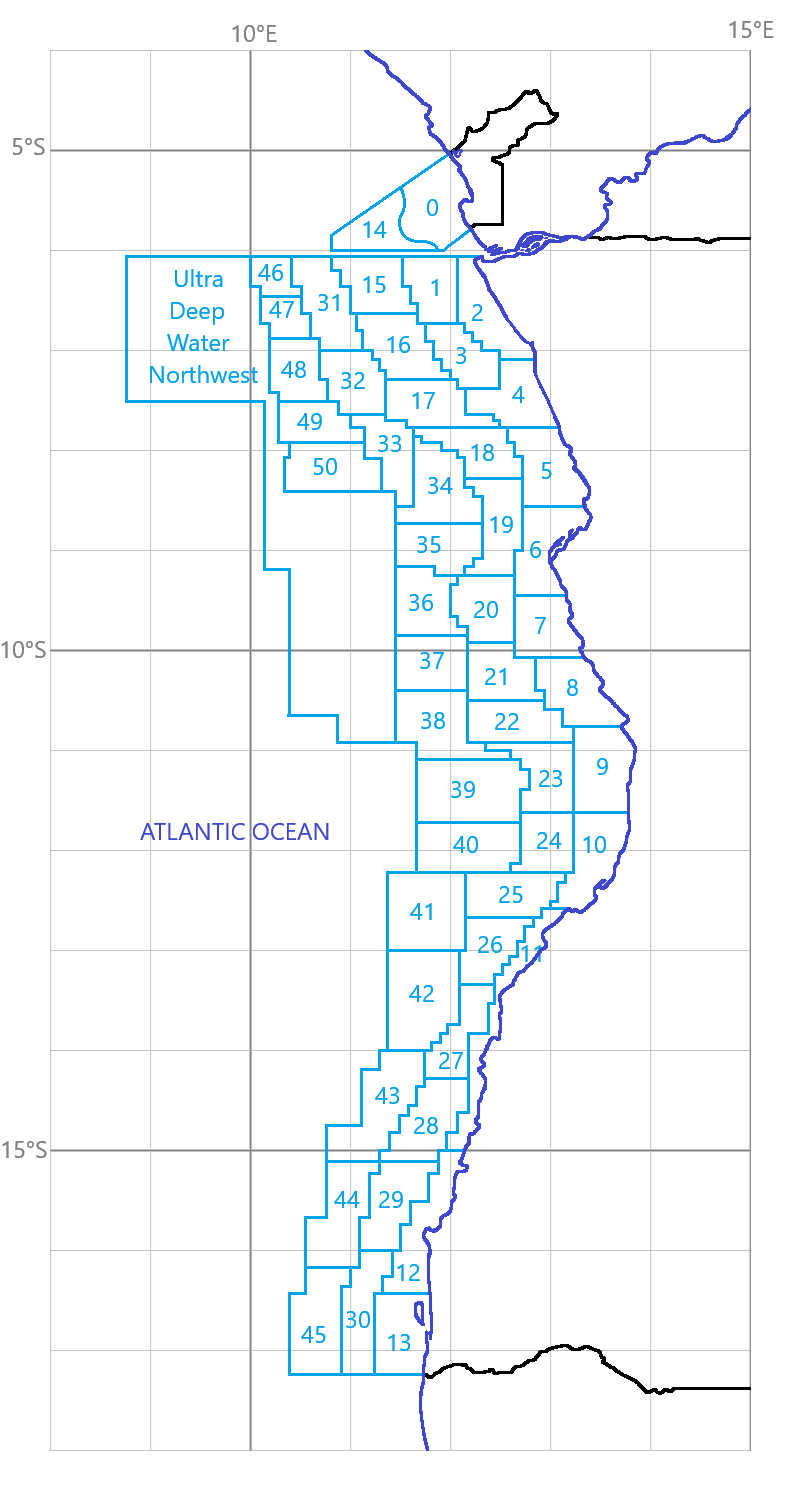
Map of Angolan offshore oil blocks. Block 17 is towards the north.

Angola produces and exports more petroleum than any other nation in sub-Saharan Africa, surpassing Nigeria first in the 2000s, then in 2022. In January 2007 Angola became a member of OPEC, before leaving in December 2023, as they wanted to expand their oil production. Under the Lourenço administration which began in 2017, the country has made efforts to incentive investments and reverse declining production, resulting in fresh investments made by international oil companies.

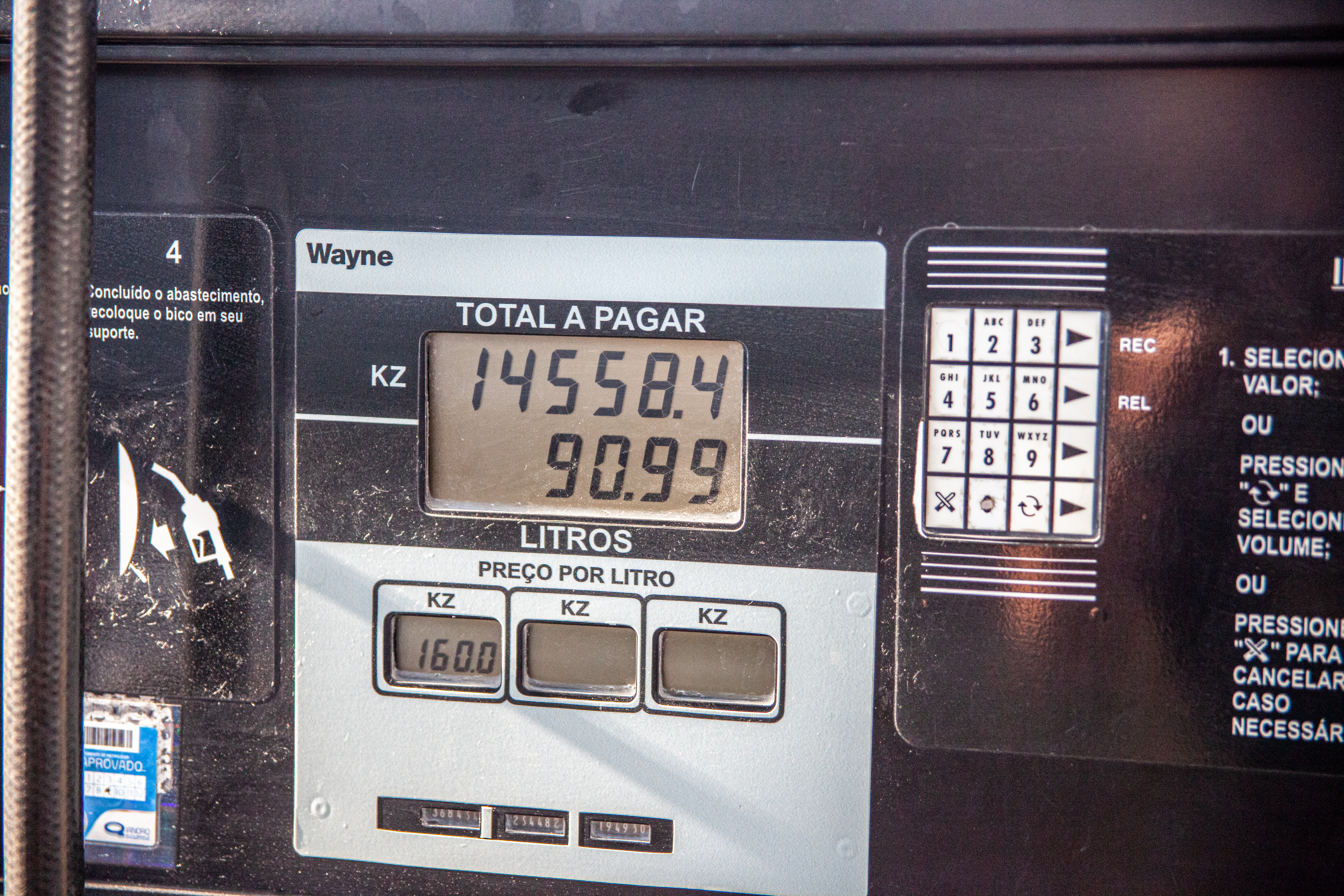
Petrol price in 2019

Chevron Corporation, TotalEnergies, ExxonMobil, Eni, and BP all operate in the country and represent a vast majority of daily production.

Block 17, operated by TotalEnergies, is Angola's biggest producing asset and is known as the Golden Block. The French major is currently executing several subsea tieback projects there, including CLOV 3 and Begonia, whose final investment decisions (FIDs) were taken in 2022. In 2026, TotalEnergies, ExxonMobil, and Chevron all announced new discoveries in their existing blocks of 17, 15, and 0 respectively. In the first quarter of 2026, Angola exported 81M barrels of oil valued over $7 billion, benefitting from higher prices due to the disruptions in the Straight of Hormuz. In the same quarter, 1.5M metric tons of natural gas were exported, representing a 30% increase in exports over the same period in 2025.

The United Nations has criticized the Angolan government for using torture, rape, summary executions, arbitrary detention, and disappearances, actions which Angolan government has justified on the need to maintain oil output.

Angola is the third-largest trading partner of the United States in Sub-Saharan Africa, largely because of its petroleum exports. The U.S. imports 7% of its oil from Angola, about three times as much as it imported from Kuwait just prior to the Gulf War in 1991. The U.S. Government has invested US$4 billion in Angola's petroleum sector.

Oil makes up over 90% of Angola's exports.

=== Diamonds ===
Angola is the third largest producer of diamonds in Africa and has only explored 40% of the diamond-rich territory within the country, but has had difficulty in attracting foreign investment because of corruption, human rights violations, and diamond smuggling. Production rose by 30% in 2006 and Endiama, the national diamond company of Angola, expects production to increase by 8% in 2007 to 10 million carats annually. The government is trying to attract foreign companies to the provinces of Bié, Malanje and Uíge.

The Angolan government loses $375 million annually from diamond smuggling. In 2003, the government began Operation Brilliant, an anti-smuggling investigation that arrested and deported 250,000 smugglers between 2003 and 2006. Rafael Marques, a journalist and human rights activist, described the diamond industry in his 2006 Angola's Deadly Diamonds report as plagued by "murders, beatings, arbitrary detentions and other human rights violations." Marques called on foreign countries to boycott Angola's "conflict diamonds". In December 2014, the Bureau of International Labor Affairs issued a List of Goods Produced by Child Labor or Forced Labor that classified Angola as one of the major diamond-producing African countries relying on both child labor and forced labor. The U.S. Department of Labor reported that "there is little publicly available information on [Angola's] efforts to enforce child labor law". Diamonds accounted for 1.48% of Angolan exports in 2014.

=== Iron ===
Under Portuguese rule, Angola began mining iron in 1957, producing 1.2 million tons in 1967 and 6.2 million tons by 1971. In the early 1970s, 70% of Portuguese Angola's iron exports went to Western Europe and Japan. After independence in 1975, the Angolan Civil War (1975–2002) destroyed most of the territory's mining infrastructure. The redevelopment of the Angolan mining industry started in the late 2000s.

== Sectors ==
=== Agriculture ===
Angola produced, in 2018:

- 8.6 million tons of cassava (8th largest producer in the world);
- 3.5 million tons of banana (7th largest producer in the world, or the 10th largest, if we consider together with plantain);
- 2.2 million tons of maize;
- 1.2 million tons of sweet potato (10th largest producer in the world);
- 806 thousand tons of potato;
- 597 thousand tons of pineapple (13th largest producer in the world);
- 572 thousand tons of sugarcane;
- 355 thousand tons of cabbage;
- 314 thousand tons of beans;
- 280 thousand tons of palm oil;
- 154 thousand tons of peanut;

In addition to smaller productions of other agricultural products, like coffee (16 thousand tons).

=== Tourism ===
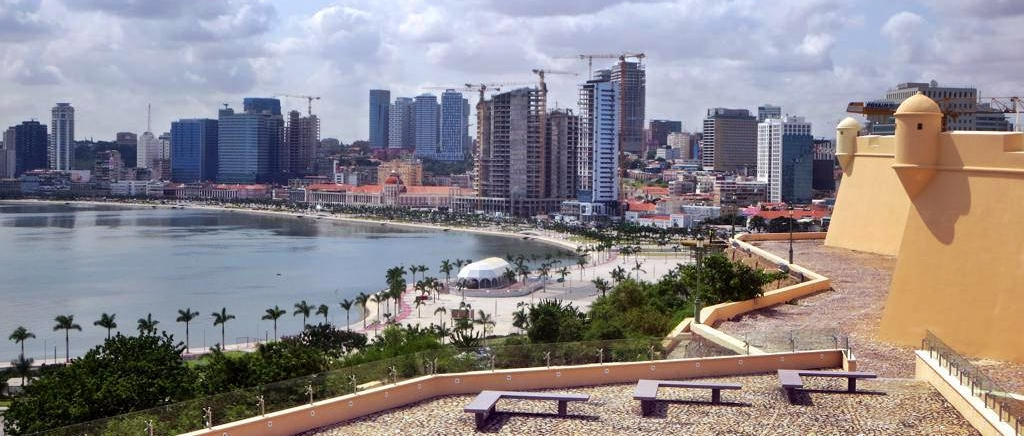
Angola's capital, Luanda, as seen from the Fortaleza.

The tourism industry in Angola is based on the country's natural environment, including its rivers, waterfalls and coastline. Angola's tourism industry is relatively new, as much of the country was ravaged during the post-colonial civil war which ended in 2002.

== Infrastructure ==
=== Energy ===
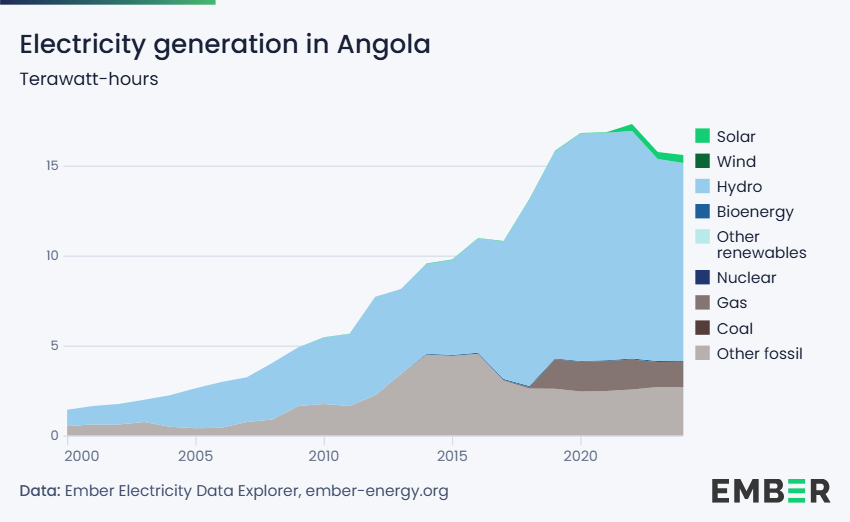
Electricity generation in Angola in terawatt-hours

Energy in Angola describes energy and electricity production, consumption and export from Angola. The energy policy of Angola reflects energy policy and the politics of Angola.

Biomass accounts for 58% of the country's energy consumption; oil accounts for 35%, gas 4% and hydroelectric power 3%.

Primary energy use in 2009 in Angola was 138 TWh and 7 TWh per million persons.

Angolans used to suffer frequent daily blackouts. In 2012, days before the election, the government announced $17B US in planned energy investment, designed to alleviate the paucity of available energy.

The International Renewable Energy Agency (IRENA) reports that Angola's renewable energy usage increased from 50% of the total energy supply in 2015 to 63% in 2020. Within this sector, bioenergy represents 85% of Angola's renewable energy supply as of 2020. This shift in Angola's energy strategy indicates a move towards sustainable resources, reducing the country's previous dependence on conventional fuels like oil and gas.

=== Telecommunications ===
Telecommunications in Angola include telephone, radio, television, and the Internet. The government controls all broadcast media with a nationwide reach.

In 2001, toward the end of Angolan Civil War, the government began adopting regulations to liberalize the telecom industry. This enabled private investments to revitalize the country's telecommunications infrastructure which had been severely damaged by the decades-long conflict. By 2012, Angola had one of the largest mobile telecom markets in sub-Saharan Africa and Internet access was growing steadily. The Ministry of Post and Telecommunications (MCT) oversees the telecommunications sector which is regulated by the Angolan National Institute of Telecommunication (INACOM).

== Foreign trade ==
Exports of Angola by product category (2019) Chemical products Transportation Machines Mineral products Plastics and rubbers Metals Foodstuffs Precious metals Textiles Instruments Animal products Vegetable products Paper goods Footwear and headwear Miscellaneous Stone and glass Wood products Animal and vegetable bi-products Animal hides Arts and antiques Weapons

=== Trade with the US ===
Exports in 2004 reached US$10,530,764,911. The vast majority of Angola's exports, 92% in 2004, are petroleum products. US$785 million worth of diamonds, 7.5% of exports, were sold abroad that year. Nearly all of Angola's oil goes to the United States, 526 kbbl/d (83.6×10^{3} m^{3}/d) in 2006, making it the eighth largest supplier of oil to the United States, and to China, 477 kbbl/d (75.8×10^{3} m^{3}/d) in 2006. In the first quarter of 2008, Angola became the main exporter of oil to China. The rest of its petroleum exports go to Europe and Latin America. U.S. companies account for more than half the investment in Angola, with Chevron-Texaco leading the way. The U.S. exports industrial goods and services, primarily oilfield equipment, mining equipment, chemicals, aircraft, and food, to Angola, while principally importing petroleum. Trade between Angola and South Africa exceeded US$300 million in 2007. From the 2000s, many Chinese have settled and started up businesses.

=== Customs administration ===
Customs and taxation are administered by the General Tax Administration (Administração Geral Tributária, AGT), created in 2014, which clears imports on the basis of the single customs declaration known as the Documento Único.

=== CNCA / ARCCLA regulations ===
Angola requires a pre-shipment loading certificate (commonly referred to as the "CNCA certificate" or ARCCLA Certificado de Embarque) for all maritime shipments with final destination ports in Angola. The certificate is intended to provide Angolan authorities with pre-arrival cargo information and control of maritime imports; one certificate is normally issued per Bill of lading.

The requirement has its basis in Angolan presidential and ministerial legislation introduced in the 1990s and subsequently updated by later regulations governing issuance and online processing of the Certificado de Embarque; ARCCLA is the national regulator responsible for certification and operates the official platform for submission and validation.

Shippers or their agents must obtain the certificate at origin before loading; required documentation commonly includes the draft or approved bill of lading, commercial invoice, packing list and, where applicable, the importer’s licensing information or tax identification. Shipments arriving without a validated certificate may be delayed, fined or denied discharge until regularization is completed.

The CNCA/ARCCLA requirement is one element of Angola’s broader import compliance regime; trade and commercial guides note that import procedures can be time-consuming and bureaucratic, so importers should plan for extra processing time and costs when shipping to Angola.

== Special economic zones, ports and logistics ==
To diversify the economy beyond petroleum, the government operates the Luanda-Bengo Special Economic Zone, which the World Trade Organization described in its 2024 review as the country's only special economic zone in operation; a second free zone was established at Barra do Dande in 2021.

Most foreign trade passes through the Atlantic seaports, of which the Port of Luanda is the largest. The Port of Lobito anchors the Lobito Corridor, a rehabilitated railway running about 1,300 km to the border with the Democratic Republic of the Congo that connects to the regional copper-and-cobalt belt; a 30-year concession was granted in 2022 to a consortium of Trafigura, Mota-Engil and Vecturis.

== See also ==
- Banco Espírito Santo Angola
- United Nations Economic Commission for Africa
