= Lumbala =

Lumbala may refer to:

- Lumbala (surname)
- Lumbala-Kakengue, a town in Moxico Leste Province, Angola
- Lumbala N'guimbo, a town in Moxico Province, Angola
