= Cazombo Airport =

Airport in Moxico Leste, Angola

- IATA: CAV; ICAO: FNCZ

Summary
- Airport type: Public
- Serves: Cazombo
- Location: Angola
- Elevation AMSL: 3,694 ft / 1,126 m
- Coordinates: 11°53′35″S 22°54′55″E

Map
- Location of Cazombo Airport in Angola

Runways
Direction	Length		Surface
Direction	m	ft	Surface
17/35	1,975	6,480	Dirt
- Source: GCM Landings.com Google Maps

Cazombo Airport (IATA: CAV, ICAO: FNCZ) is an airport serving the city of Cazombo, in the Moxico Leste Province of Angola. It has its IATA Code as CAV, and ICAO Code as FNCZ.

The Cazombo non-directional beacon (Ident: CZ) is on the field.

== See also ==
- List of airports in Angola
- Transport in Angola
