= Lobito Corridor =

Infrastructure project in Africa

Route information
- Length: 1,300 km (810 mi)

Major junctions
- From: (Angola) Lobito
- To: (Zambia) Ndola

Location
- Countries: Angola; Democratic Republic of the Congo; Zambia

Highway system

The Lobito Corridor is a railway and logistics infrastructure project that aims to connect the Port of Lobito on the Atlantic coast of Angola to the Central African Copperbelt in the Democratic Republic of Congo (DRC) and Zambia, with the aim of facilitating the transport of goods between Central Africa and global markets. The project is supported via the G7 Partnership for Global Infrastructure and Investment (PGI) by the United States and the European Union through its Global Gateway initiative.

== Overview ==
The central axis of the Lobito Corridor is the Benguela railway. The project further envisions the rehabilitation of the Congolese stretch of the railway from the border town of Dilolo via Kolwezi and Lubumbashi to Kapiri Mposhi in Zambia, as well as construction of a new railway spur from Luacano through Zambia's North-Western and Copperbelt provinces to Chingola. Investments in road and logistics infrastructure along the corridor are also planned.

US and EU support for the project is based on the desire for easier access to Central Africa's critical raw materials such as copper and cobalt.

== History ==
The central axis of the Lobito Corridor, the Benguela railway, was originally built in the first half of the 20th century to connect Central Africa to the coast, but its service was interrupted in the later half of the century due to the destruction caused by the Angolan Civil War. After the end of the war, reconstruction began in 2006 under an agreement between Angola and China financed by a $2 billion loan from Beijing. The official reopening of the Angolan section to the border in Luau took place in 2015 with a joint ceremony between Angola, the DRC, and Zambia.

In 2022, Angola awarded the concession for its section to the Lobito Atlantic Railway consortium, comprising Mota-Engil, Trafigura and Belgian railway operator Vecturis.

In October 2023, the European Union and the United States of America signed a Memorandum of Understanding with Angola, Zambia and the DRC for a partnership regarding the Lobito Corridor. In August 2024, the first shipment of copper from the DRC reached the US after travelling through the corridor towards the Port of Lobito, marking a milestone in its revival as a key logistics route. The project is being backed by major US and EU investments, including a €116 million EU Global Gateway package and hundreds of millions from the US-initiated G7 Partnership for Global Infrastructure and Investment (PGI). In December 2024, during a U.S. presidential delegation visit to Angola, AI-driven mining exploration firm KoBold Metals signed a memorandum of understanding (MoU) with the Africa Finance Corporation (AFC). Under the agreement, KoBold agreed to serve as an anchor client for the planned greenfield Zambia–Lobito rail link, committing to transport at least 300,000 metric tons of copper and related freight annually from its Mingomba deposit in Chililabombwe, Zambia, bolstering the rail line's commercial bankability.

== Geopolitical relevance ==
The DRC and Zambia hold vast deposits of critical raw materials such as copper, cobalt, zinc, iron and uranium. As of December 2025, exploitation of these resources is dominated by foreign companies, particularly from China. Much of the raw materials are exported via ports on Africa's eastern and southern coasts: Dar es Salaam in Tanzania, Beira in Mozambique and Durban in South Africa. Transportation relies heavily on trucks, with roundtrip journeys taking several weeks. The railway lines of the Lobito Corridor, when operational, would provide a quicker, cheaper and more reliable export route.

That this route is oriented towards the Atlantic Ocean, i.e. towards the US and Europe, makes it particularly attractive to these actors. By supporting a westward-oriented export corridor, the US and EU are hoping to gain easier access to critical raw materials and to diminish the Chinese dominance in the region's mining sector.

Through its Belt and Road Initiative (BRI), China has also made significant contributions to infrastructure development in the region. The G7 PGI and the EU's Global Gateway, the initiatives through which the Lobito Corridor is supported, are viewed as deliberate Western counters to the BRI. The European Commission describes the Lobito Corridor as a "key Global Gateway flagship."

In light of this, in November 2025, China signed a $1.4 billion agreement with Zambia and Tanzania for the modernisation of the competing TAZARA Railway, linking Zambia's Copperbelt to Tanzania's Dar es Salaam port.
