= Lobito Atlantic Railway =

Angolan-Congolese train line

The Lobito Atlantic Railway (LAR) is a joint venture, operating trains along the Benguela railway corridor from the coast of Angola into the Democratic Republic of Congo.

== Route ==
The railway runs from Lobito, on Angola's Atlantic coast, 1700km eastwards to Kolwezi in the Democratic Republic of Congo (DRC), with a proposed link to Zambia.

== Joint venture ==
The Lobito Atlantic Railway is a joint venture between Trafigura, Mota-Engil, and Vecturis, an independent rail operator. Trafigura plans to invest $455 million in Angola and up to $100 million in DR Congo.

We see the Lobito rail corridor as a partnership between the private and public sectors. A partnership of three countries – Angola, the DRC and Zambia and of three companies – Trafigura, Vecturis and Mota-Engil

— Jeremy Weir, Trafigura executive chairman and CEO

The G7 Partnership for Global Infrastructure and Investment (PGI) prioritizes infrastructure projects in developing countries, including through a series of investments in the Lobito Corridor to connect the African continent from sea to sea. In October 2023, PGI signed an MOU between the U.S., Angola, the DRC, the EU, Zambia, the African Development Bank, and Africa Finance Corporation to develop the Corridor, initiating a new rail line expansion to Zambia. In alliance, the U.S. International Development Finance Corporation (DFC), in February 2024, approved a $250 million investment, increased, in June 2024, with a $553 million loan for development of the LAR.

== Operations ==
The joint venture was awarded the concession to manage the Lobito rail corridor for 30 years in 2022. A ceremony was held in Lobito on 4 July 2023 to mark the transfer, attended by the presidents of Angola, DR Congo, and Zambia.

The LAR will provide "a faster and safer route" for passenger trains in Angola, including the "Ombaka Express". There are also plans to improve connectivity for copper and cobalt mines in DR Congo, especially Kamoa-Kakula.

The railway anticipates operating at least 1555 wagons and 30 locomotives in Angola; more if DR Congo is included, with the initial 275 wagons ordered from the South African company Galison Manufacturing in June 2024.

MV Lindsaylou, a bulk cargo vessel, was the first ship to dock at the LAR mineral terminal at the Port of Lobito, launching the venture's port operation in Angola on July 12, 2024. The cargo ship held sulphur to be transferred to LAR cargo trains for shipment to the DRC and used in refined copper production in the Katanga region.
