= Lago-Dilolo =

Coordinates: 11°30′S 22°01′E

- commune
- Location in Angola
- Country: Angola
- Province: Moxico Leste
- Time zone: UTC+1 (WAT)

Lago-Dilolo is a town and commune of Angola, located in the province of Moxico Leste.
