= Lovua =

Lovua Lóvua do Zambeze
- commune
- Location in Angola
- Coordinates: 11°33′17″S 23°33′01″E
- Country: Angola
- Province: Moxico Leste
- Time zone: UTC+1 (WAT)

Lovua, also known as Lóvua do Zambeze, is a town and commune of Angola, located in the province of Moxico Leste.
