= Intranet =

Network of private resources in an organization

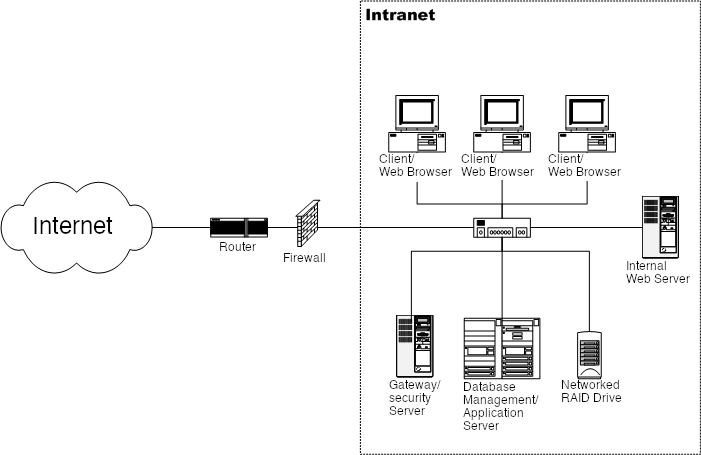
Schematic depicting an intranet

An intranet is a computer network for sharing information, easier communication, collaboration tools, operational systems, and other computing services within an organization, usually to the exclusion of access by outsiders. The term is used in contrast to public networks, such as the Internet, but uses the same technology based on the Internet protocol suite.

An organization-wide intranet can constitute a focal point of internal communication and collaboration, and provide a single starting point to access internal and external resources. In its simplest form, an intranet is established with the technologies for local area networks (LANs) and wide area networks (WANs). Many modern intranets have search engines, user profiles, blogs, mobile apps with notifications, and events planning within their infrastructure.

An intranet is sometimes contrasted to an extranet. While an intranet is generally restricted to employees of the organization, extranets may also be accessed by customers, suppliers, or other approved parties. Extranets extend a private network onto the Internet with special provisions for authentication, authorization and accounting (AAA protocol).

== Uses ==
Intranets are often used to deliver tools, such as for collaboration (to facilitate working in groups and teleconferencing) or corporate directories, sales and customer relationship management, or project management. Intranets are also used as corporate culture-change platforms. For example, a large number of employees using an intranet forum application to host a discussion about key issues could come up with new ideas related to management, productivity, quality, and other corporate issues. In large intranets, website traffic is often similar to public website traffic and can be better understood by using web metrics software to track overall activity. User surveys also improve intranet website effectiveness.

Larger businesses allow users within their intranet to access public internet through firewall servers. They have the ability to screen incoming and outgoing messages, keeping security intact. When part of an intranet is made accessible to customers and others outside the business, it becomes part of an extranet. Businesses can send private messages through the public network using special encryption/decryption and other security safeguards to connect one part of their intranet to another.

Intranet user-experience, editorial, and technology teams work together to produce in-house sites. Most commonly, intranets are managed by the communications, HR or CIO departments of large organizations, or some combination of these.

Because of the scope and variety of content and the number of system interfaces, the intranets of many organizations are much more complex than their respective public websites. Intranets and the use of intranets are growing rapidly. According to the Intranet Design Annual 2007 from Nielsen Norman Group, the number of pages on participants' intranets averaged 200,000 over the years 2001 to 2003 and has grown to an average of 6 million pages over 2005–2007.

== Benefits ==
Intranets can help users locate and view information faster and use applications relevant to their roles and responsibilities. With a web browser interface, users can access data held in any database the organization wants to make available at any time and — subject to security provisions — from anywhere within company workstations, increasing employees' ability to perform their jobs faster, more accurately, and with confidence that they have the right information. It also helps improve services provided to users.

Using hypermedia and web technology, intranets allow for the synchronized sharing of corporate knowledge, such as employee manuals, benefits documents, company policies, business standards, news feeds, and training, all of which can be accessed throughout a company using common internet standards. Intranets are also used as a platform for deploying applications to support business operations across the inter-networked enterprise.

Information is easily accessible to all authorised users, enabling collaboration. Being able to communicate in real-time through integrated third-party tools, such as an instant messenger, promotes the sharing of ideas and removes blockages to communication to help boost a business's productivity.

Intranets can serve as powerful tools for communicating (such as through chat, email and/or blogs) within a given organization about vertically strategic initiatives that have a global reach throughout said organization. The type of information that can easily be conveyed is the purpose of the initiative and what it is aiming to achieve, who is driving it, results achieved to date, and whom to speak to for more information. By providing this information on the intranet, staff can keep up-to-date with the strategic focus of their organization. For example, when Nestlé had a number of food processing plants in Scandinavia, their central support system had to deal with a number of queries every day. When Nestlé decided to invest in an intranet, they quickly realized the savings. Gerry McGovern says that the savings from the reduction in query calls was substantially greater than the investment in the intranet.

Users can view information and data via a web browser rather than maintaining physical documents such as procedure manuals, internal phone list and requisition forms. This can potentially save the business money on printing, duplicating documents, and the environment, as well as document maintenance overhead. For example, the HRM company PeopleSoft "derived significant cost savings by shifting HR processes to the intranet". McGovern goes on to say the manual cost of enrolling in benefits was found to be US$109.48 per enrollment. "Shifting this process to the intranet reduced the cost per enrollment to $21.79; a saving of 80 percent". Another company that saved money on expense reports was Cisco. "In 1996, Cisco processed 54,000 reports and the amount of dollars processed was USD19 million".

Many companies dictate computer specifications which, in turn, may allow Intranet developers to write applications that only have to work on one browser such that there are no cross-browser compatibility issues. Being able to specifically address one's "viewer" is a great advantage. Since intranets are user-specific (requiring database/network authentication prior to access), users know exactly who they are interfacing with and can personalize their intranet based on role (job title, department) or individual ("Congratulations Jane, on your 3rd year with our company!").

Since "involvement in decision making" is one of the main drivers of employee engagement, offering tools (like forums or surveys) that foster peer-to-peer collaboration and employee participation can make employees feel more valued and involved.

== Planning and creation ==
Most organizations devote considerable resources into the planning and implementation of their intranet as it is of strategic importance to the organization's success. Some of the planning would include topics such as determining the purpose and goals of the intranet, identifying persons or departments responsible for implementation and management and devising functional plans, page layouts and designs.

The appropriate staff would also ensure that implementation schedules and phase-out of existing systems were organized, while defining and implementing security of the intranet and ensuring it lies within legal boundaries and other constraints. In order to produce a high-value end product, systems planners should determine the level of interactivity (e.g. wikis, on-line forms) desired.

Planners may also consider whether the input of new data and updating of existing data is to be centrally controlled or devolve. These decisions sit alongside to the hardware and software considerations (like content management systems), participation issues (like good taste, harassment, confidentiality), and features to be supported.

Intranets are often static sites; they are a shared drive, serving up centrally stored documents alongside internal articles or communications (often one-way communication). By leveraging firms which specialise in 'social' intranets, organisations are beginning to think of how their intranets can become a 'communication hub' for their entire team. The actual implementation would include steps such as securing senior management support and funding, conducting a business requirement analysis and identifying users' information needs.

From the technical perspective, there would need to be a coordinated installation of the web server and user access network, the required user/client applications and the creation of document framework (or template) for the content to be hosted.

The end-user should be involved in testing and promoting use of the company intranet, possibly through a parallel adoption methodology or pilot programme. In the long term, the company should carry out ongoing measurement and evaluation, including through benchmarking against other company services.

== Maintenance ==
Some aspects are non-static.

=== Staying current ===
An intranet structure needs key personnel committed to maintaining the intranet and keeping content current. For feedback on the intranet, social networking can be done through a forum for users to indicate what they want and what they do not like.

=== Privacy protection ===
The European Union's General Data Protection Regulation went into effect May 2018. Since then, the protection of the privacy of employees, customers and other stakeholders (e.g. consultants) has become more and more a significant concern for most companies (at least, all those having an interest in markets and countries where regulations are in place to protect the privacy).

== Enterprise private network ==
An enterprise private network is a computer network built by a business to interconnect its various company sites (such as production sites, offices and shops) in order to share computer resources.

Beginning with the digitalisation of telecommunication networks, started in the 1970s in the US by AT&T, and propelled by the growth in computer systems availability and demands, enterprise networks have been built for decades without the need to append the term private to them. The networks were operated over telecommunications networks and, as for voice communications, a certain amount of security and secrecy was expected and delivered.

But with the Internet in the 1990s came a new type of network, virtual private networks, built over this public infrastructure, using encryption to protect the data traffic from eaves-dropping. So the enterprise networks are now commonly referred to as enterprise private networks in order to clarify that these are private networks, in contrast to public networks.

== See also ==
- eGranary Digital Library
- Enterprise portal
- Intranet portal
- Intranet strategies
- Intranet Wiki
- National intranet
- Virtual workplace
- Web portal
