= Intranet strategies =

In business, an intranet strategy is the use of an intranet and associated hardware and software to obtain one or more organizational objectives. An intranet is an access-restricted network used internally in an organization. An intranet uses the same concepts and technologies as the World Wide Web and Internet. This includes web browsers and servers running on the internet protocol suite and using Internet protocols such as FTP, TCP/IP, HTML, and Simple Mail Transfer Protocol (SMTP).

== Role of intranets ==
Intranets are generally used for four types of applications:

1) Communication and collaboration

- send and receive e-mail, faxes, voice mail, and paging
- discussion rooms and chat rooms
- audio and video conferencing
- virtual team meetings and project collaboration
- online company discussions as events (e.g., IBM Jams)
- inhouse blogs

2) Web publishing

- develop and publish hyperlinked multi-media documents such as:
  - policy manuals
  - company newsletters
  - product catalogs
  - technical drawings
  - training material
  - telephone directories

3) Business operations and management

- order processing
- inventory control
- production setup and control
- management information systems
- database access

4) Intranet portal management

- centrally administer all network functions including servers, clients, security, directories, and traffic
- give users access to a variety of internal and external business tools/applications
- integrate different technologies
- conduct regular user research to identify and confirm strategy (random sample surveys, usability testing, focus groups, in-depth interviews with wireframes, etc.)

== Why have an intranet strategy? ==
Having a strategy pre-supposes a planned, orderly process with proper costing and budgeting, it involves consulting with the parties who are going to be using the intranet, allows for an efficient integration with existing systems and phasing-out of older ones, has long term benefits when the intranet needs to be scaled or made more secure, maintains control and quality in the hands of the designated department that "owns" it, and creates for the provision of feedback to monitor whether the "investment" is living up to the organization's expectations.

== Potential advantages of using intranets ==
- reduces printing, distribution, and paper costs - particularly on policy manuals, company newsletters, product catalogs, technical drawings, training material, and telephone directories
- easy to use - no specialized training required
- inexpensive to use (once it is set up)
- moderate initial setup costs (hardware and software)
- standardized network protocol (TCP/IP), document protocol (HTML), and file transfer protocol (ftp) already well established and suitable for all platforms
- can be used throughout the enterprise
- reduces employee training costs
- reduces sales and marketing costs
- reduces office administration and accounting costs
- ease of access results in a more integrated company with employees communicating and collaborating more freely and more productively

== Potential disadvantages of intranets ==
- it is an evolving technology that requires upgrades and could have software incompatibility problems
- security features can be inadequate
- inadequate system performance management and poor user support
- may not scale up adequately
- maintaining content can be time-consuming
- some employees may not have PCs at their desks
- The aims of the organisation in developing an intranet may not align with user needs (see: further reading)

== See also ==
- extranet
- Information technology management
- internet
- intranet
- web portal
- marketing
- strategic management
- strategic planning
- management
- management information systems
