= Cameia National Park =

National park in Moxico Leste province, Angola

- Location within Angola
- Nearest city: Cameia
- Coordinates: 11°53′S 21°40′E
- Area: 1,445 km^{2} (558 sq mi)
- Established: 1938

Cameia National Park is a national park in the Moxico Leste province of Angola, located about 1100 m above sea level. It covers a surface of 14.450 km^{2}. It shares its name with the nearby municipality of Cameia. The Cameia–Luacano road forms the northern boundary of the park with the Chifumage River forming the southern portion of the eastern boundary and the Lumege and Luena rivers the south-western boundary.

Much of the park consists of seasonally inundated plains that form part of the Zambezi river basin, with the northern half of the park draining into the Chifumage river. There are also extensive miombo woodlands, similar to those in the Zambezi basin of western Zambia. The park is a sample of nature not occurring elsewhere in Angola. Two lakes, Lago Cameia and Lago Dilolo (the largest lake in Angola) lie outside the park boundaries and both have extensive reedbeds and grassy swamps that are rich in aquatic birds.

== History ==
The area now known as Cameia National Park was established as a game reserve in 1938 and as a National Park in 1957. The wildlife in the park has been almost completely wiped out after the civil war wrought devastation to the park, including uncontrolled poaching and the destruction of infrastructure. There is a serious lack of staff, resources and support for the park.
