= Alto Zambeze =

Municipality in Moxico province, Angola

- Municipality
- Location within Angola
- Country: Angola
- Province: Moxico Leste
- Seat: Cazombo

Population (2014)
  - Total: 110,900

Alto Zambeze is a municipality in the Moxico Leste province of Angola. It is situated near the Zambian border, with a population of 110,900 (2014 census) and a total area of 53,000 km^{2}. The municipality's seat is the town of Cazombo, on the Zambezi river.
