= Cazombo =

- Municipality
- Location in Angola
- Coordinates: 11.9°S 22.9°E
- Country: Angola
- Province: Moxico Leste

Area
  - Total: 25,315 km^{2} (9,774 sq mi)

Population (2024 census)
  - Total: 100,313
  - Density: 3.9626/km^{2} (10.263/sq mi)
- Time zone: UTC+1 (WAT)

Cazombo is a municipality with a population of 100,313 (2024), and the capital of Moxico Leste Province in Angola since the province's establishment in 2024. Previously it was the seat of the municipality of Alto Zambeze. Cazombo is on the east bank of the Zambezi River. It is subdivided into the communes of Cazombo and Lumbala Caquengue.

== Transport ==
Cazombo is served by Cazombo Airport located on the eastern outskirts of the town.
