= Cameia =

Municipality in Moxico Leste, Angola

Coordinates: 17.2461°S 19.3482°E

Cameia, formerly Lumeje, is a municipality in Moxico Leste, Angola. It is notable for being the location of Cameia National Park, which was established as a game reserve in 1938 and proclaimed a national park in 1957. The municipality also contains two lakes, Lago Cameia and Lago Dilolo, the largest lake in Angola. It had a population of 29,476 in 2014.
