= Lumbala-Kakengue =

Lumbala-Kakengue Lumbala Caquengue
- Commune
- Location in Angola
- Country: Angola
- Province: Moxico Leste
- Municipality: Cazombo

Population (Census 2014)
  - Total: 19,000
- Time zone: UTC+1 (WAT)

Lumbala-Kakengue or Lumbala Caquengue is a town of Angola, located in the province of Moxico Leste.
