= Grupo Opaia SA =

- Type: Holding company
- Founded: 2002; 24 years ago in city, country
- Founder: Agostinho Kapaia
- Headquarters: Luanda, Angola
- Website: opaia.co.ao

Grupo Opaia SA is a holding company operating under Angolan law based in Luanda, Angola, running projects in civil construction services, solar energy technology, drinking water systems, hotel service and tourism, agriculture, finance and more. It was founded by the Angolan Agostinho Kapaia, from Huambo, in 2002. From the year 2012 it began to be present on a national scale while it is planned to cover every province with its services. Most of the projects are yet in an early stage, but the companies Greenpower and NBASIT and the projects Meña of Opaia Water and Casa Feliz of Opaia Construction already got a lot of attention. For reasons of purchase, investment and international knowledge among others, there are offices abroad in Lisbon in Portugal, São Paulo in Brazil, Guangzhou in China, Miami in the US and the main office is in the own capital Luanda.

The company is divided into four divisions: Opaia Produção (Production), Opaia Imobiliária (Real Estate), Opaia Investimento (Investments) and Opaia Serviços (Services). These are also divided into various sections and units. In October 2012 the billing was not yet revealed, the investment in the first half of 2012 was US$20 million. The holding company was co-founder of Group of Business Leaders Angola (Grupo de Lideres Empresariais, LIDE), which was officially launched in December 2011. Companies have to make a billing of at least US$50 million to become a member of this organization. The Group also has various partnerships with the Government whose project Angola Investe was a support for some companies of the Group in 2012.

The activities of the Group indicate that it aims to sustainability and social development of Angolans as important objectives, beyond the financial aspect, by investing in projects that streamline the Angolan economy and that offer opportunities to populations lacking funding. The team appears to be idealistic by wanting to participate in and contribute to development, growth and the national reconstruction of Angola. In anticipation of the stock exchange planned for some time in Angola, Agostinho Kapaia said in an interview in June 2012: ‘We want to be one of the first Angolan companies listed on the Stock Exchange’.

== Opaia Produção (Production) ==
Opaia Production had its start in 2012 and consists of the sections Opaia Energia (Energy), Opaia Ambiente (Environment) and Opaia Engenharia (Engineering), which also consist of multiple units.

=== Opaia Energia (Energy) ===
The business Opaia Energy wants to provide services to the area of Crude Oil, through Oil e Gas Consulting e Manutenção (Oil and Gas Consulting and Maintenance). For this the company is looking for partnerships with other companies.

=== Opaia Ambiente (Environment) ===
Opaia Environment is set up through three parts, which are Greenpower, Opaia Águas (Water) and Opaia Resíduos (Waste).

=== Greenpower ===
Greenpower, led by the General Director Carlos Igrejas, is a company of renewable energies, these are Photovoltaic Solar Energy and Thermal Solar Energy. It is located in Viana Park in Luanda with a showroom, store and assembly line of Kits. The two business areas are distribution of equipment and the realization of projects ‘chave-na-mão’ (‘key-in-hand’), being the development, the implementation and the maintenance of systems. Greenpower is installing photovoltaic systems for illumination of school, hospitals, police stations, administrative organs and public roads, and also systems for the supply of water for irrigation in agriculture and for the placement of panels for water heating. The target groups are rural populations. The company's facilities were inaugurated in May 2012 in the presence of the Secretary of State of Energy, Joaquim Ventura. The initial investment was the amount of six million US dollars. According to Carlos Igrejas, the company expected to bill US$11.5 million and to create 50 direct and indirect jobs, through the several projects to be implemented in the 18 provinces of Angola. The plant would have an initial workforce of 30 people. The enterprise was in the process of having some pilot experiences in the provinces of Namibe and Kwanza-Norte, in a project subsidized by the central government. The group's administrator Carlos Rola disclosed that depending on customer needs, the mounted solar panels could cost US$1,000–40,000. Greenpower at that time already had realized a contract with the provincial government of Luanda to install at least 500 electric power stations in seven neighborhoods.

The venture appears to make sense in a country with one of the largest numbers of hours of sun, and can reduce the necessity of generators and the use of oil. While the technology is imported from countries like China, Germany and the United States, the assembly, training of personnel and maintenance of equipment is being done in Angola.

The president of the holding Agostinho Kapaia confirmed that one of the main goals of the creation of the company is to help in tackling poverty and the development of the country. He declared at the act of inauguration ‘Only those countries that manage to combine economic growth with social development can be considered states with eyes on the future and Angola is certainly one of those countries, that’s why Greenpower pretends to lead this transformation in energy’. The Secretary of State of Energy, Joaquim Ventura, regarded the company as a partner of the government in the implementation of its energy projects, especially in the countryside. In remote areas or in cities like Luanda do still exist enormous challenges for the supply of electricity. Until 2012 Angola was dependent in the area of renewable energy on businesses seated abroad and technical capacity and executive projects had to be imported.

=== Opaia Águas (Water) ===
The second unit of Opaia Ambiente is Opaia Águas, introduced to the press in April 2012 through the first project. It does the management of water systems consisting of supply and treatment. In the treatment the project ‘Meña’ stands out. It is designed to carry pure drinking water to little towns of 500 to 2,000 inhabitants with lack of drinking water, until the most remote locations of the country. The one responsible for the technical coordination of this project is Hélder Alves. Meña is a system that functions automatically with solar energy, but also with a generator or a battery. Depending on the region it can purify water coming from rivers, lakes and ponds, including water considered brackish. It has ultra-filtration membranes through which water passes already treated this way and suitable for human consumption. This way the sand conventionally used is not necessary nor another kind of product to disinfect. This process already takes out all organic material, viruses and bacteria.

The initial investment of ‘Meña’ was US$700 thousand and the first provinces to grasp the opportunity were Kwanza-Norte and Namibe. The purchase value of a unit varies between 50 and US$120 thousand, and the smaller model has a capacity to produce two thousand liters water per hour. The estimated cost per capita would be US$40–50. Hélder Alves reported that this was a project created for the Angolan reality, with an analysis of the place of catchment, studies about the water quality and that they would adapt the conditions to the demands of the people. The enterprise recruited and trained local technicians to maintain the functionality of the equipment. Moreover, it is included in the governmental program of Combat against Poverty for the promotion of economic and social sustainable development, according to those responsible. ‘It will guarantee better food security and diminish the occurrence of communicable diseases through contaminated water’, the president of the Group clarified.

The system is also indicated for military or humanitarian operations. Provincial governments appear to be the natural customers for the project. Via the presence of the Opaia Group in Brazil the company also tried to sell the solutions ‘Meña’ in the northeast of that country. The name ‘Meña’ is a translation of ‘water’ in kimbundu, one of the national languages of Angola. It has an unused terminology in Angolan spelling, but that is justified as being a trademark from an artistic point of view.

=== Opaia Resíduos (Waste) ===
Opaia Environment has at last a unit called Opaia Waste which wanted to concentrate its forces on the capital Luanda, according to the brochure on the internet page of the Group. It has the plan to participate in the management of collecting urban and suburban solid waste and also in urban and suburban cleaning and in its environmental treatment, in order to do this from collection until treatment by way of sanitary landfills or incinerators. It is an area of future expansion: ‘We are in negotiations with three provinces for the construction of landfills for waste of hospitals’, as declared by the president of the Opaia Group in an interview.

=== Opaia Engenharia (Engineering) ===
The third and last section of Opaia Production is Opaia Engineering. It has four units or companies, being Openip – Fiscalização (Supervision), Opaia Clima (Climate), Opaia Construção Civil (Construction) and Opaia Manutenção Imobiliária (Real Estate Maintenance).

=== Openip – Fiscalização (Supervision) ===
This company does the supervision by completing bids or does guidance of public and private works that companies offer. Examples are the coordination and management of projects, consultancy in engineering and the decontamination of soils. This could be the intervention in hotels, tourist facilities, office buildings until works of art. The group's own enterprises are possible clients.

=== Opaia Clima (Climate) ===
Opaia Climate organizes studies, analyses and implements industrial systems of air conditioning and forced air. It does the assembly of systems and the subsequent maintenance.

=== Opaia Construção Civil (Construction) – Microcenter Construções ===
Of Opaia Engineering the construction company was the most famous in the first years because of the Project Casa Feliz (Happy Home). Opaia had acquired land in Huambo and in Luanda. Also approved were projects for the construction of three condominia in the neighborhood Benfica and condominia in the neighborhood Talatona in Luanda. This was published in an extensive article in the Angolan newspaper Exame in June 2012, which also announced that the project Casa Feliz in Huambo was already concluded.

=== Casa Feliz ===
Success began in 2010 with the presentation of the first project called ‘Casa Feliz’ (Happy Home), to respond to the serious housing problems in Angola. The director-general in charge of the works of the company, Microcenter Construções, was João Carlos Gomes. It was forecasted there would be built 25 thousand houses for low-income families in seven of the 18 provinces of Angola. The houses are designed with urban infrastructure; in the first place the networks of supply of drinking water, electricity and sewerage. The homes are of the type T3, having 100 square meters of floor area in batches up to 400 square meters. The company estimated that the price of a house would be less than 10 percent of the average value on the real estate market and that the premises could be traded up until the price of €30.47 thousand (US$40 thousand). There was also the intention to build joint leisure facilities, like playground and sports fields. The amount of premises in every province would be seven thousand in Luanda, three thousand each in Huambo, Huíla and Cabinda, five thousand in Benguela and two thousand each in Bié and Zaire. Most of the houses that Microcenter would construct were filed with the Government that should proceed to its delivery to the families who are at risk or in need of transfer because of other building projects going on.

The project began in January 2010, estimated to take two years, in the province of Huambo. The first few thousand homes needed an investment of US$4 million. This would provide 60 direct and indirect jobs, for young Angolans who had the ability to build four pre-fabricated houses per day. This was framed in the National Program of Urbanism and Housing (Programa Nacional de Urbanismo e Habitação), which aims to benefit low and middle income citizens. In addition, the planned construction would generate 2,000 jobs, mostly to be occupied by Angolans, according to the managing director Agostinho Kapaia in a declaration to the national press agency ANGOP. The homes can be sold for a relatively low cost thanks to the agreement made between the company and the Angolan State, which would support the costs of the lands in turn. This was welcome when it is realized that the prices of premises in 2008 were still at least US$1 million, while in Luanda in 2012 an apartment T3 could still surpass this value. But the price of US$40 thousand is still too much for the majority of the population, and the government tried to solve this with the set-up of a program to encourage the credit offers by commercial banks by way of subsidized credit, which was still difficult.

In May 2011 30 residences would be delivered to the local government of Huambo, according to João Carlos Gomes, announced in a press release of Angop. It was a lot on the land of Lossambo, 11 kilometers south of the city of Huambo, part of a larger batch of 500 homes that had to be built at that location.

=== Opaia Manutenção Imobiliária (Real Estate Maintenance) ===
The last part of Engineering is Opaia Real Estate Maintenance. In the month of November 2012 there was not yet published anything about the state of this undertaking.

== Opaia Imobiliária (Real Estate) ==
The second division of the Opaia Group is Opaia Real Estate divided into the units of Tourism (Turismo), Agriculture (Agricultura) and of Promotion (Promoção). It has its center in the province of Huambo.

=== Hotel Ekuikui ===
Hotel Ekuikui in the city of Huambo was the first hotel project in a chain of 20 hotels of the holding company, directed to a higher segment of customers. The hotel was going to be officially opened in August 2012 with the name of a former king of Huambo and it has four stars. The capacity is 80 rooms and it received an investment of US$12 million funded by the BAI bank. The goal is the realization of a hotel in every province. ‘If all goes well we have plans to expand this business model to other countries like Brazil and Mozambique. We are inviting the banks and some national and international investors to participate in this project’, citing Agostinho Kapaia in June 2012.

The development of this enterprise is happening in the first phase of the master plan designed by the provincial management board of Commerce, Hotels and Tourism which marked 116 points of touristic significance in the municipalities of the province to recover and explore until 2017. The head of the management board issued in September 2012 to ANGOP that it considered the growth of the hotel network as positive, with the emergence of hotels and restaurants in all the municipalities of the region. At that time the sector provided 926 rooms and more than 1.201 beds in Huambo.

=== Foz do Kwanza ===
Foz do Kwanza (Kwanza Estuary) is going to be a resort of Opaia Tourism located in Barra do Kwanza at the estuary of the Kwanza river south of the capital Luanda, at the coast on the southeast side of the river in an area of seven hectares. The legal documentation, the business plan and the feasibility study were in the possession of the company in June 2012, while it was still waiting for the entry of partners at the time.

=== Opaia Agricultura (Agriculture): Agripaia Agropecuária (Food Cropping and Live Stock) ===
The second business of Opaia Real Estate is Opaia Agriculture with the enterprise Agripaia Agropecuária, owner of an area of 600 hectares on Fazenda Chipipa (Chipipa Farm) on the outskirts of the city of Huambo. The company wants to resume a practice in Angolan agriculture that had great success in colonial times and also want to contribute to lowering of the high prices in the domestic market, which is highly dependent on imports with high amounts of food products. It was ‘an innovating project’ in the sectors of fruits and sheep and that of cereals, in which was invested an amount of US$2 million. A Brazilian entrepreneur was contracted to assist in the preparation of the land and in the purchase of machinery. In June 2012 the enterprise was waiting for a reply from Banco de Desenvolvimento de Angola (Development Bank of Angola, BDA) for a request for funding of US$6 million.

The branch of agriculture is promising, but it is not easy. The production is still not providing enough for the domestic market, a reason why Angola depends on import and that is one reason for the high prices. But the opportunities are enormous: documents of the United Nations and a published project of students of the Czech University of Life Sciences Prague name (calculated) numbers of 35 until 67 million hectares of Angola suitable for agriculture, of which few are in regular use. This specific project could contribute to national production and create employment. The soba (type of tribal chief still named liked this in current times) and his sons were also working on the farm. In this sense the project is socioeconomic in first place.

=== Opaia Promoção (Promotion) ===
The last section of Opaia Real Estate is Opaia Promotion which includes a logistic project and a company. Also named Opaia Logistics (Logística), it has space for storage in cross-border areas in the provinces of Moxico and Zaire, intended for own use and to sell and rent.

=== Centro Logístico de Belém (Logistics Center of Belém) ===
The Logistics Center of Belém is situated in Belém in the north of the province of Huambo, near the provinces of Kwanza-Sul and Bié, in the center of Angola. It will be made up of 12 warehouses and a large commercial space for retail stores. With this site it is expected to become an important distribution warehouse well located. In an interview in June 2012 for the magazine Exame Agostinho Kapaia explained that the land has already been purchased and that they were waiting for licenses. The construction would start in 2013.

=== Ovikuata ===
Ovikuata is a company that was born to sell real estate. In the month of November there was not yet more information available about investments or the organization.

== Opaia Investimento (Investments) ==
The third division of the Opaia Group is Opaia Investments (Investimento), divided into two parts: Opaia Incubadora and Opaia Financial Investments (Investimentos Financeiros), which have two initiatives each. Through financial investments it wants to capture and generate business and create new jobs.

=== NBASIT / Novabase ===
NBASIT is a company focused on technological solutions for businesses, in the sectors of banking, telecommunication, energy and also in transport, providing them with intelligent infrastructures, data centers, consultancy of processes, information technology, ticket selling systems and more. The office was opened in Luanda in October 2010, resulting from a partnership between the renowned Portuguese Novabase and the Angolan company Microcenter of António Mosquito, who held 50 percent both. It is Microcenter in which the Opaia Group has a stake. Miguel Vicente started as executive director of the new company NBASIT. The brochure of Opaia also indicates that NBASIT is there to provide assistance to startups, new entrepreneurial projects with innovating and original characteristics. Supporting new entrepreneurs in business plans and finding financing is another task that the company wants to commit itself to. The president of Novabase Luís Paulo Salvado stated in 2009 that he did view the potential of the Angolan Market as an opportunity for NBASIT to be the leader within a few years. With regard to the partnership, the two had already developed other projects at the time.

The initial social capital was US$500,000, declared by Salvado to the press at the opening in Luanda; a quantity that could increase through growth in the market. Novabase itself was established in 1989 in Portugal and is listed on the stock exchange Euronext Lisbon since 2000. It had developed an experience through the years and obtained revenue of 241 million Euros (US$342 million) in 2009 in 28 countries. Angola was a new priority and with about 20 employees NBASIT would invest US$300 thousand in training, wishing to achieve a turnover of more than US$10 million by the end of 2010. Customers at the time were Unitel, Movicel, Zap, Multitel, BAI, Millennium, Atlântico and BESA among others. The brother of President Kapaia, Aires Kapaia also works in the group and had already worked with him as a technician for Novabase.

=== Ever It ===
Another partner of the Opaia Group is Ever It that dedicates itself to the implementation of information technology systems for companies. It works in the programming and maintenance of computer systems and in licensing of software products.

=== Opaia Investimentos Financeiros (Financial Investments) ===
The second section of Opaia Investments is Financial Investments, active in the areas of Education and Banking. It is dedicated to the search for financing (also for the Angolan State) and it manages the financial holdings of the Group. An important office in these areas is in Miami in the United States.

=== Educação (Education) ===
The Opaia Group holds a 30% stake in the Escola Técnica Superior da Administração Pública (Technical School of Public Administration, ETSAP), and 30% in the Instituto de Formação Pública e Administrativa (Institute for Public and Administrative Training, I.F.P.A.). ETSAP is aimed at the training of middle management and at technical-professional education. This school is stationed in Luanda and will start in 2013 in partnership with Brazilian universities. The office in São Paulo, Brazil, is destined to handle this link.

=== Banca (Banking) ===
This financial service has its own resources to function as a solution in banking support. It is focused on the neediest populations according to the Group's brochure, thus aimed to improve local economies.

== Opaia Serviços (Services) ==
The last area of Opaia is Services and it wants to support areas of administrative and operational management of the group's companies as well as external clients.

=== Opaia Distribuição (Distribution) ===
Opaia Distribution is a unit responsible for distribution of products of the Group and external clients and it is envisaged to be present in 15 provinces in own stores by the end of 2013.

=== M. Katur Housing and Cars ===
M. Katur is a transport and a car rent firm stationed in Luanda since 2008, owned by the Opaia Group. It has the intention to give mobility of transport to Angolans, but even more for people from abroad, being able to also arrange accommodation for them. In this sense the connection was made to the hotel market and tourism in Angola.

=== Opaia Europa ===
Opaia Europa in Lisbon, Portugal, has the objective to search (human) resources and solutions worldwide to develop the business of the Opaia Group and here investment opportunities outside Angola are also evaluated. The office is managed by the vice-president of the Group Luís Dias who devotes himself above all to the control of management, business and recruitment.

== Sponsorship ==
In May 2012 a sponsorship deal was signed by the Angolan Paralympic Committee (CPA) with the Opaia Group. The group would sponsor the CPA for four years, with an annual value of US$30,000. The act occurred at the Centro de Conferências de Belas (Conference Center of Belas) in Luanda.

== See also ==
LIDE Angola
