= Moxico Leste Province =

Province of Angola

Moxico Leste
- Province
- Coordinates: 12°S 23°E
- Country: Angola
- Established: 5 September 2024
- Capital: Cazombo

Government
  - Governor: Crispiniano Vivaldino Evaristo dos Santos (MPLA)
  - Vice-Governor for the Political, Social and Economic Sector: Pedro Camilo da Costa Supula
  - Vice-Governor for Technical Services and Infrastructure: Mario Anderson Mutupa

Area (Note: Calculated by summing the officially provided areas of the former municipalities of Alto Zambeze, Cameia, Luacano and Luau prior to Angola's 2024 territorial reorganization.)
  - Total: 75,421 km^{2} (29,120 sq mi)

Population (2024)
  - Total: 411,074
  - Density: 5.4504/km^{2} (14.116/sq mi)
- Time zone: UTC+1 (WAT)

Moxico Leste is a province of Angola. It was created on 5 September 2024 from the eastern part of Moxico Province. Its capital is Cazombo.

== Geography and climate ==
Moxico Leste borders the Angolan provinces of Lunda Sul to the northwest and Moxico to the southwest. It also borders Lualaba Province in the Democratic Republic of the Congo (DRC) to the northeast, and Zambia's North-Western Province to the southeast. Much of Moxico Leste lies in the upper Zambezi River basin, except for the portion along the Kasai River that demarcates the provincial border with Lunda Sul. Cameia National Park is located in the province, as is Lake Dilolo, Angola's largest lake. Ecoregions found in the province include Angolan miombo woodlands, Zambezian evergreen dry forests and Zambezian flooded grasslands.

Moxico Leste experiences a tropical savanna climate with the dry season or cacimbo running from May to August.

== History ==
Since at least 2016, there have been proposals to divide Moxico, formerly Angola's largest province by area, into two smaller provinces. On 14 August 2024, Angola's National Assembly approved a law to create three new provinces, including separating the municipalities of Alto Zambeze, Cameia, Luacano and Luau from Moxico to form the new province of Moxico Leste. This law went into effect with its publication in the official gazette of Angola on 5 September 2024. Originally the new province was to be named Cassai Zambeze, but the name was changed after consultation with Nhakatolo Ngambo, the sovereign of the Luvale and Lunda peoples.

== Administration ==
Moxico Leste is divided into the nine municipalities of Caianda, Cameia, Cazombo, Lago Dilolo, Lóvua do Zambeze, Luacano, Luau, Macondo and Nana Candundo. Cazombo is further subdivided into the communes of Cazombo and Lumbala Caquengue, and Macondo is subdivided into the communes of Macondo and Calunda.

The first governor of Moxico Leste is Crispiniano Vivaldino Evaristo dos Santos, who was appointed in December 2024.

== Demographics ==
The former municipalities that now form part of Moxico Leste reported a combined population of 250,584 in the 2014 census. In 2022 the population of these municipalities was projected at 318,582 inhabitants. Major ethnic groups in the region include the Chokwe, Luvale, and Lunda Dembo.

== Economy and infrastructure ==
The main economic activity in Moxico Leste is agriculture. In colonial times, Alto Zambeze was a major rice producer in Angola, while nowadays Cameia is a locally significant producer of fruits such as oranges and bananas. Anglo American, Rio Tinto, and Ivanhoe Mines are prospecting in the area for minerals such as copper, zinc, titanium and aluminum. Many Angolans living near the national border go to work in the DRC and Zambia.

The Benguela railway runs through the towns of Cameia, Luacano and Luau. National road EN250 connects Luau to Cazombo, but it is in a severe state of disrepair.
