= Intranet Design Annual =

The Intranet Design Annual is a yearly intranet design contest with 10 winners. The contest focuses on usability. The contest was created by Kara Pernice in 2001, and is organised by Nielsen Norman Group who each year publishes a report with detailed case studies on the awarded intranets.

== See also ==
- Intranet
- Usability
