= Lumbala (surname) =

Lumbala is a surname. Notable people with the surname include:

- Roger Lumbala (born 1958), Congolese politician;
- Rolly Lumbala (born 1986), Canadian football player;
- Steven Lumbala (born 1991), Canadian football player.
