= Mota-Engil =

Portuguese group

Mota-Engil SGPS, S.A.
- Company type: Sociedade Anónima
- Traded as: Euronext: EGL
- Industry: Conglomerate
- Founded: 1946
- Headquarters: Porto, Portugal
- Key people: António Mota (chairman); Gonçalo Moura Martins (CEO)
- Services: Infrastructure and real estate construction and engineering; water treatment; waste management; logistics; port operation; transport concessions
- Revenue: €2.368 billion (2014)
- Operating income: €273 million (2014)
- Net income: €50.6 million (2014)
- Total assets: €1.036 billion (end 2014)
- Total equity: €578 million (end 2014)
- Website: www.mota-engil.pt

Mota-Engil is a Portuguese group in the sectors of civil construction, public works, port operations, waste, water, and logistics. The chairman of the board of directors is António Mota and Gonçalo Moura Martins is the company's CEO. Jorge Coelho led the group's Executive Committee from 2008 to 2013 and was a consultant in Mota-Engil's Strategic Advisory Council.

The registered office of this business group is in Amarante, the municipality where it was founded. Its head offices are located in Porto and Lisbon.

The Mota-Engil Group comprises 228 companies within three major business areas – Engineering and construction, Environment and Services and Transport concessions – operating in 21 countries through its branches and subsidiaries, including Mota-Engil Engenharia e Construção, S.A., Tertir, SUMA, INDAQUA, Manvia, Vibeiras, Ascendi and Martifer.

Mota-Engil was ranked in the 100 biggest European construction companies in 2008, but currently ranked in the sector's 30 biggest European companies and it is the only Portuguese company in the World Top 100.

Mota-Engil SGPS, the group's holding, is listed in the PSI-20, the main stock market index of Euronext Lisbon.

== History ==
In June 1946, Manuel António da Mota incorporated Mota & Compania in the Portuguese city of Amarante. In that same month and year, a branch of the company was opened in Angola. Until 1974 Mota & Companhia operations focused on the Angolan territory, firstly in the exploration and processing of timber and as of 1948 also in the area of construction and public works. In 1952, Mota & Companhia was awarded the contract to develop Luanda International Airport, near Luanda, the first major public work executed by the company in this territory, at the time still under Portuguese colonial administration.

In the same year in Lisbon, Portugal, Fernando José Saraiva and António Lopes de Almeida founded Engil, Sociedade de Engenharia Civil, Lda. In 1954, Simões Cúcio and António Valadas Fernandes joined Engil and gave it a new boost and renewed energy. In 1961, Engil's operations, until then focused on the region of Lisbon, started spreading to other regions within Portuguese territory through the award of the Escola Industrial e Comercial of Castelo Branco, Portugal, and the construction, in Mirandela, of the bridge over the Tua River. 1969 marked the signing of a contract with the company Siemens-Baunnion. Engil acquired for Portugal the exclusive rights of use of the Siemcrete patented sliding forms system, allowing it to carry out countless major works involving silos and chimneys. Through the expansion of its operations, the North delegation was created in Porto.

== Operations in Africa ==
In 1975, Mota & Companhia expanded its activity to other African territories and started in Namibia with the construction of the Dreihuk dam. In South Africa, it was responsible for the infrastructures of the Sun City Resort and of the Matooster – Bierkraal road. Later, in Swaziland the company built the Lonhlupheko – Lomahasha road. All these constructions led Mota & Companhia into a process of progressive internationalization of its operations and businesses.

1976 was marked by an upturn of Mota & Companhia in Portugal through the award of a small dam (Lucefecit, Alentejo). Shortly afterwards, Mota & Companhia was awarded the contract for the regularization works of the Lower Mondego River. This allowed the company to launch itself as one of the top construction companies for large national building projects and soon became the third-largest Portuguese company within this sector.

In 1978, together with Retosa based in Caracas, Venezuela, Engil participated for two years in the construction of factories and the Guri Dam. As of 1980, Mota & Companhia expanded its operations within the People's Republic of Angola. In this same year, in a partnership with the Angolan government, it set up the company Construção de Terraplenagens Paviterra, UEM. Mota & Companhia and Paviterra were for many years the only corporate structures involved in the construction of public works in Angola.

In August 1987, Mota & Companhia, a limited company, became a public limited liability company, following which it floated 12% of its equity capital on the stock market and requested admission to the Lisbon Stock Exchange. That year Engil SGPS was incorporated endeavoring to meet the evolving public and private works market and the need to diversify its activities. In the following years the company acquired Sociedade de Empreitadas Adriano (1988), Gerco - Sociedade de Engenharia Electrotécnica, SA (1990) and Ferrovias e Construções (1991). The year 1987 became associated with the major public work - the construction of the Lindoso Dam. The size and technical features of this project make it a landmark example amongst the major works developed by Engil.

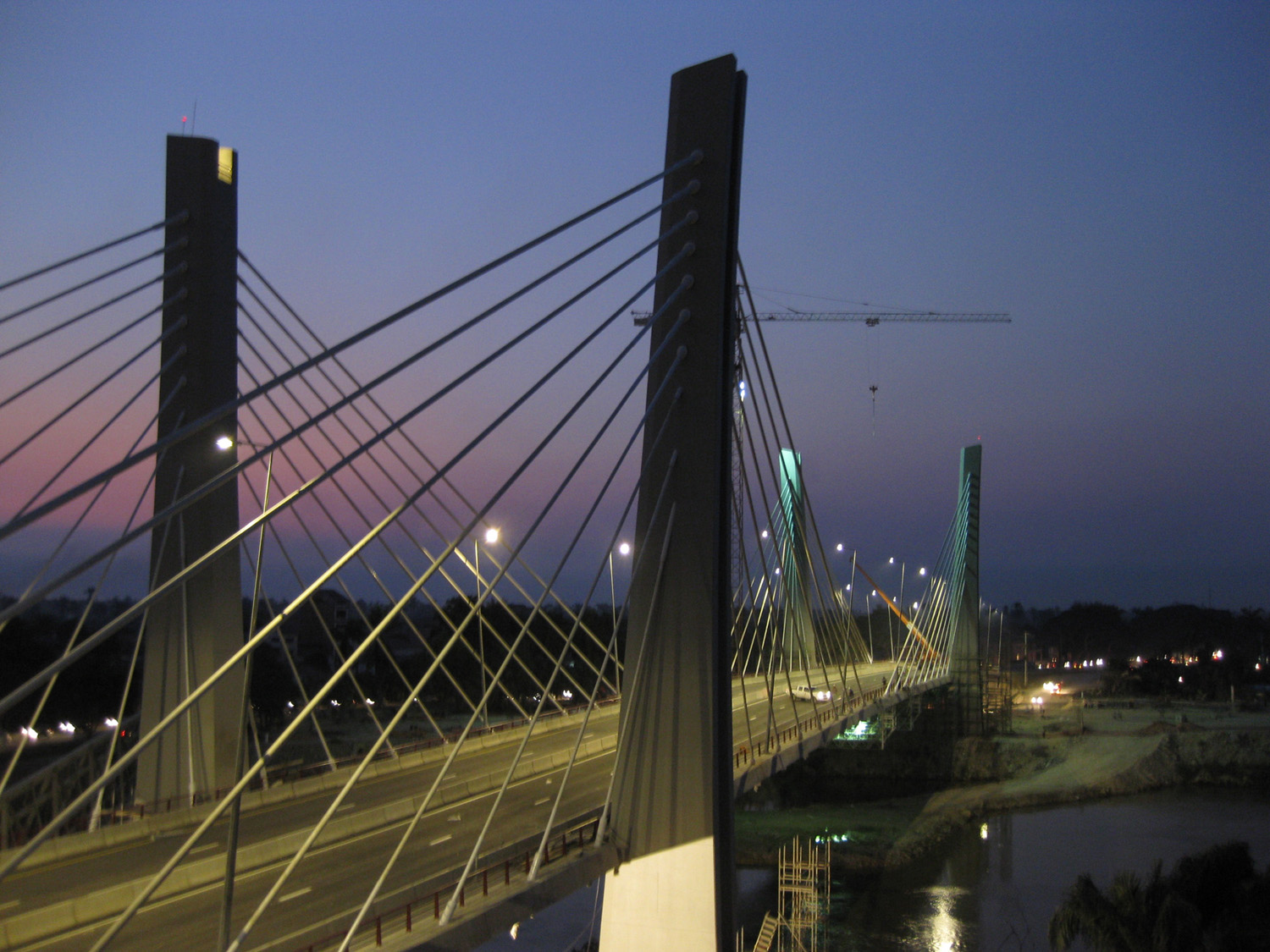
Catumbela bridge in Angola.

By entering the Angolan market in 1989, Engil's internationalization process was relaunched. In 1993, 1994 and 1996, a new boost was given to the internationalization process when the company entered Mozambique, Germany and Peru. As of 1990, Mota & Companhia gave a push to the diversification of its activities. It went into business in real estate development, road signs, prefabrication of structural elements, ceramics, asphalt masses, commercialization of vehicles and equipment, maritime transport and the paint industry.

In 1994 Mota & Companhia comprised the construction consortium of the Vasco da Gama Bridge, in Lisbon connecting the north and south banks of the Tagus River. The year was further marked by more diversification of businesses by venturing into the area of Transport Concessions together with other reference companies. Hence, Lusoponte, a concessionary company of the Tagus road crossing downstream of Vila Franca de Xira, was incorporated.

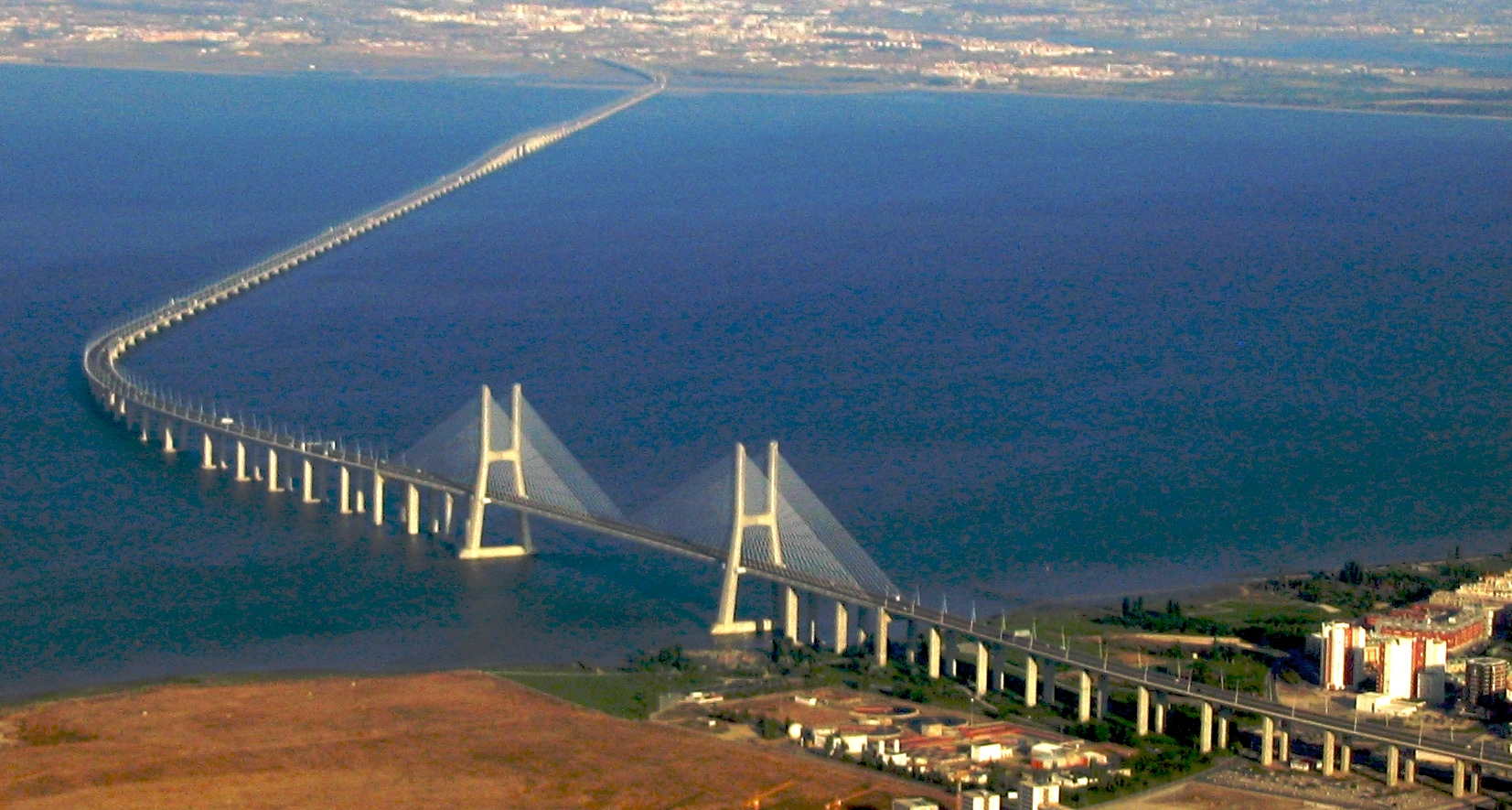
Vasco da Gama bridge in Lisbon, Portugal.

On 23 July 1999, the companies of the Mota family launched a take-over bid for the whole of the equity capital of Engil SGPS; this led to the constitution of the Mota-Engil Group in 2000. In 2002 the merger of Mota & Companhia, SA, Engil – Sociedade de Construção Civil, SA and Mota-Engil Internacional, led to the creation of the largest Portuguese construction company. Simultaneously, the diversification strategy was intensified, with a special focus on the transport concessions and environment and service sectors. In 2003 four autonomous business areas were established. The holding company Mota-Engil SGPS aggregates Mota-Engil, Engenharia e Construção, SA, Mota-Engil, Ambiente e Serviços, SGPS, SA, MEITS – Mota-Engil, Imobiliário e Turismo, SA, Mota-Engil, Concessões de Transportes, SGPS, SA, and holds the capital of Mota-Engil Serviços Partilhados Administrativos e de Gestão, SA. In 2012 the Group's organization model changed, defined by regions (Portugal/Africa/Central Europe and Latin America).

In 2014 the Mota-Engil Group acquired Empresa Geral de Fomento (EGF) in a public tender, began operations in Uganda, and was awarded a contract in Cameroon worth $3.5 billion, the largest in its history.

The Lobito Atlantic Railway joint venture was formed between Mota-Engil, Trafigura and Vecturis, and received a 30-year concession to operate the Lobito rail corridor in 2022. The concession spans 1,300 kilometres across Angola, with an extension of 400 kilometres into the Democratic Republic of the Congo, plus possible service into Zambia. The concession was formalized at a ceremony on 4 July 2023, and attended by the Presidents of Angola, Congo, and Zambia.

== Central Europe ==
Mota-Engil Central Europe S.A. forms part of Mota-Engil Group. It is an international construction company providing mainly general contracting services for road and bridge construction, general construction and housebuilding. The company is present in Poland, Czech Republic, Slovakia, Hungary and Romania. Moreover, Mota-Engil Central Europe S.A. is a producer of asphalt mixtures, bridge prefabricates and all sorts of concrete. The company actively promotes the improvement of road safety, protection and improvement of the environment and OHS.

Currently, the company's seat is located in Kraków. The company is present in the regions of Warsaw, Lubartów, Wrocław, Rzeszów, Białystok and Katowice.

=== Major projects ===
1. Execution of two contracts for the construction and renovation of 142 objects at A4 motorway

Section: Wrocław – Prądy, bridgeworks
Section: Prądy-Nogawczyce, bridgeworks

1. Reconstruction of A4 motorway section Balice-Opatkowice
2. Reconstruction of national road n.7 section Zabornia-Chyżne
3. Construction of A4 motorway Zgorzelec-Krzyżowa section “B” Wykroty-Krzyżowa
4. Construction of A4 motorway section Nogawczyce-Kleszczów
5. Construction of A-2 motorway section Konin-Koło
6. Construction of a road viaduct along with access roads to Stalowa Wola
7. Construction of Radzikowski Interchange in Kraków
8. Expansion of national road n.7 Kraków-Chyżne, section Myślenice-Pcim
9. Reconstruction of the viaduct in Strzelin
10. Reconstruction of the viaduct over PKP railroad in Stalowa Wola
11. Designing and construction of the second bridge over the Vistula River in Sandomierz
12. Construction of the bypass of Zembrzyce
13. S8 Jeżewo-Białystok
14. S8 Wrocław - Psie Pole – Syców
15. S3 Międzyrzecz-Sulechów
16. Construction of Kribi, Cameroon to Mbalam standard gauge railway for iron ore traffic. Also branch line to Nabeba in Congo. The length of the rail lines including the branch is approximately 580km.
17. Simandou Iron Ore Project
18. Nigeria rolling stock contract

== Expansion to Eastern Europe ==
Internationally, the order book in Eastern Europe has been strengthened. After the merger of both of the group's subsidiaries, Mota-Engil Polska was incorporated as the fourth-largest construction company operating in Poland. In 2005 Mota-Engil is listed on the PSI-20, the main Euronext Lisbon index. At the end of 2006, via Mota-Engil Ambiente e Serviços, SGPS, the Mota-Engil Group acquired a controlling stake in the Tertir Group, thus entering in the logistics and port sector.

In 2007, Martifer SGPS, a subsidiary of the Mota-Engil Group, requested admission to trading on Euronext Lisbon, increasing the capital from 75 million shares to 100 million shares through an Initial Public Offer (IPO) of 25,000,000 shares representing the share capital.

In 2008 Ascendi was set up, resulting from a partnership between Espírito Santo Concessões and Mota-Engil Concessões. This new company will comprise the assets of the two groups in the sector of transport concessions. On 26 May 2008 the Board of Directors of Mota-Engil SGPS deliberated the constitution of an Executive Committee and Jorge Coelho being appointed chairman, a position he held until 2013.

On January 5, 2011, Mota-Engil Engenharia e Construção, SA was awarded the Nielsen Norman Group 2011 Intranet Design Award.

In 2014 Mota-Engil received two IRGA awards, one for best Investor Relations Officer, received by João Vermelho, responsible for Market Relations and the other as the company with the best stock exchange performance.

== Controversies ==
In 2006, Mota-Engil was the target of searches and its leader António Mota accused in 2009 for involvement in defrauding the tax system worth several hundred million euros, among 700 others suspects. António Mota, his sister Maria Manuela agreed to pay the Portuguese tax authorities around 6.1 million euros in two installments in order not to be accused by the Portuguese Central Department of Investigation and Criminal Action of committing the crime of tax fraud.

In 2012, Mota-Engil was accused in Malawi of bribing the late former president Bingu Wa Mutharika with more than 40 thousand euros, which were offered in exchange for contracts between 2010 and 2011.

Mota-Engil was one of the entities that was attributed the most contracts and public-private partnerships (PPP) during the two governments of Portuguese prime minister José Sócrates, earning it the label "contractor of the Socratic regime" among some media outlets, as registered on the Portuguese government site for public contracts.

In Peru, Mota-Engil was among 30 companies referred to in an investigation by the Peruvian Public Ministry in 2018 on suspicion of benefiting from public works contracts through illegal agreements, in which the company would receive contracts in exchange for a percentage of the value of the work.

In 2019, members of Mota-Engil in Argentina, together with Rovella Carranza and the construction company JCR, with whom they were associated with, were called to appear in court in Argentina as part of a process known as "Corruption Notebooks", the largest investigation against corruption in the history of Argentina. At issue was the allegation of joining an illicit association led by former president Cristina Kirchner to divert money from public works on a weekly basis.

In 2020, Mota-Engil announced the sale of more than 30% of its capital to the Chinese public company CCCC, one of the largest infrastructure groups in the world.

== See also ==
- Lobito Atlantic Railway, a joint venture including Mota-Engil
