= Luacano =

- Location within Angola
- Coordinates: 11°13′S 21°39′E
- Country: Angola
- Province: Moxico Leste

Population (2014)
  - Total: 20,755

Luacano is a town and municipality in Moxico Leste Province, Angola. The municipality had a population of 20,755 in 2014.

The Luacano River (Rio Luacano) flows past the town to the west before entering the Kasai River, which forms the border between Moxico and Luanda Sul. During negotiations over the border between the Belgian Congo and Portuguese Angola the Belgians pushed for making the Luacano River part of the border.

== Transport ==
A new rail line, part of the Lobito Corridor, was proposed in 2023 as a direct link between Angola's Benguela Railway at Luacano and the Zambian Copperbelt at Chingola.
