= Dilolo Lake =

Lake in Moxico province, Angola

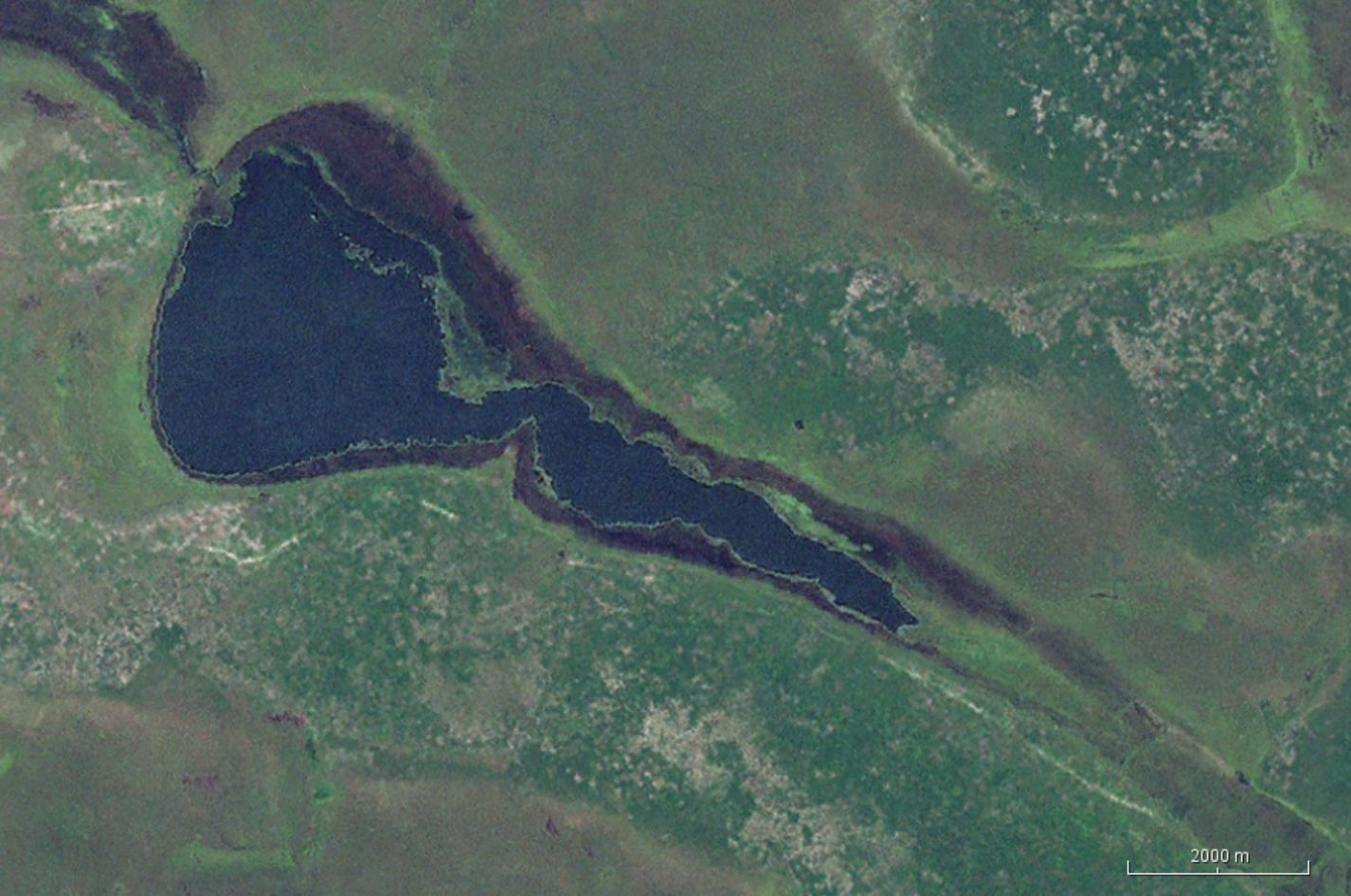

- Location within Angola
- Location: Moxico Leste, Angola
- Coordinates: 11°31′S 22°03′E
- Basin countries: Angola
- Surface area: 18.9 km^{2} (7.3 sq mi)
- Surface elevation: 1,097 m (3,599 ft)

Dilolo Lake is the largest lake in Angola. It is located in Moxico Leste Province. The lake is located right outside of Cameia National Park.
