= Africa Finance Corporation =

African multilateral development finance bank

- Type: Private
- Industry: Finance
- Founded: 2007
- Headquarters: 3a Osborne Road; Ikoyi, Lagos State, Nigeria
- Key people: Emeka Emuwa (Chairman); Samaila Zubairu (President & CEO)
- Products: Development Finance Institution
- Total assets: US$10.5 billion (2022)
- Owner: African governments African banks Private equity funds Insurance groups
- Website: www.africafc.org

Africa Finance Corporation (AFC) is a pan-African Multilateral Development Financial Institution established in 2007 by sovereign African states to provide pragmatic solutions to Africa's infrastructure deficit and challenging operating environment. The Corporation bridges the infrastructure investment gap through the provision of debt and equity finance, project development, technical and financial advisory services.

AFC's investment remit is pan- African, focusing on investment across makes investments across five key sectors; Power, Transport and Logistics, Natural Resources, Telecommunications and Heavy industries.

AFC is majority owned by private investors the bulk of which are African financial institutions, Private investors own 62% of the corporation. A further 38% is owned by the Central Bank of Nigeria. In addition to private investors owning shares, AFC’s allows African states (through their respective central banks, sovereign wealth funds, state pension funds or similar institutions) to be both shareholders and members of the corporation. As of December 2022, AFC has forty (40) member states.

Africa Finance Corporation, to date, has invested over US$11.5 billion in infrastructure projects across Africa.

== History ==
=== Early projects ===
Africa Finance Corporation (AFC) was launched in December, 2007 by the founding President and Chief Executive Mr Austine Ometoruwa, then Citibank Africa Investment Bank Head and by the founding Chairman Chukwuma Soludo, then governor of the Central Bank of Nigeria (CBN), with US$2 billion of authorised share capital.

In June, 2009 AFC agreed an equity financing deal with a consortium of investors in the US$240 million Main One Cable System, a 7,000 km submarine fibre-optic cable connecting West Africa to Europe.

By July 2009, it was reported by Reuters that AFC had US$180 million invested in oil and gas, telecoms, transport and airline projects – mainly in Nigeria.

In September 2011, the corporation partnered with the African Export-Import Bank (Afreximbank) and Banque Internationale pour l' Afrique Occidentale - Côte d'Ivoire (BIAO-CI) in a US$320 million trade finance facility to finance the importation, processing and refining of crude oil by Societe Ivoirienne de Raffinage (SIR).

=== Power generation ===
In June 2013, AFC announced its support for privatisation of the Nigerian power sector, providing a US$215 million debt financing facility for the acquisition of the Ughelli Power plc by Transcorp. The previous month it had joined Lagos-based Vigeo and India’s Tata Power in a consortium which successfully bid US$129 million for Benin Distribution Company. In August 2013, AFC provided a US$170 million loan facility to Nigerian firm Mainstream Energy Solutions Limited (MESL) in its successful bid for the 1,338 MW Kainji Hydroelectric power plant in Niger State, Nigeria.

At the same time it was invited to become a private sector partner in the US $7 billion USAID-funded ‘Power Africa’ initiative announced by US President Obama in Cape Town. AFC has since invested US$250 million and leveraged an additional US$1billion of investments in the power sectors of Ghana, Kenya and Nigeria.

In December 2014, AFC took a 23.2% stake in Mozambican power developer Ncondezi Energy.

Also in December 2014, AFC became the largest investor and lead developer in the US$900 million Kpone Independent Power Project (Kpone IPP) in Ghana, which comprises a 350MW gas turbine, a substation and fuel storage.

In July 2015, the corporation signed a joint development agreement with the Ivorian project company Ivoire Hydro Energy SA (IHE) to build a 44MW hydroelectric power plant in Singrobo, Côte d'Ivoire.

In June 2016, AFC and institutional investor Harith General Partners merged their power sector assets to form a new entity combining renewable and non-renewable power generating assets in Africa.

== Financing ==
AFC signed its first loan – a US$50 million bilateral deal with Standard Bank – in July 2011. The following year the African Development Bank (AfDB) approved a US$200 million line of credit to AFC with the mandate to catalyse investments and help bridge Africa’s infrastructure gap.

In October 2013, AFC launched its first syndicated loan – a US$250 million deal with Citibank, Rand Merchant Bank, Standard Bank, and Standard Chartered Bank – to finance trade projects.

In June 2016, AFC borrowed US$150 million for 15 years from KfW, for onward lending in the sectors of power, telecommunications, transport and heavy industry.

In 2022, South African Public Investment Corporation made a $100 million equity investment into AFC.

== Projects ==
=== Power ===
- Cen Power Kpone IPP in Ghana
- Cabeolica Wind farm in Cape Verde
- 450MW IPP In Republic of Benin
- 350MW IPP in Ghana
- 300MW IPP in Mozambique
- Technical Adviser to the Central Bank of Nigeria on its US$2 billion Power and Aviation Intervention *Fund (PAIF)
- AFC/Harith Merger
- Singrobo Hydro Power Plant
- Kenya Power & Lighting Company

=== Transport & Logistics ===
- Henri Konan Bedie Bridge in Côte d'Ivoire
- Ethiopian Airline Expansion
- Bakwena Toll Road in South Africa
- Ghana Airport Company
- Port d’ Abidjan
- Financial Adviser to Nigeria Sovereign Investment Authority (NSIA) on the Second Niger Bridge
- Olam Gabon Special Economic Zone (GSEZ)

=== Heavy Industries ===
- ARM Cement (Formerly Athi River Mining Limited)

=== Telecommunications ===
- Main One cable system
- SAIF acquisition, South Africa

=== Natural Resources ===
- Seven Energy
- Megadrill Services Limited
- Société Nationale des Pétroles du Congo, Republic of Congo
- Bonny Gas Transport
- Glencore/Société des Hydrocarbures du Tchad
- Vivo Energy
- Shalina Resources Limited
- New Age (African Global Energy)
- Alufer Mining Limited
- Carbon Holdings Limited
- Aker Energy offshore project
- Brahms Oil Refineries Limited
- Eritrean Collui Potash
