= Orochi (disambiguation) =

Yamata no Orochi (shortened to Orochi) was a famous eight-headed dragon in Japanese mythology. This may also refer to:

- Oroch people or Orochi, a Russian people that speak a Tungusic dialect
- 10888 Yamatano-orochi, an asteroid from the asteroid belt.
- Mitsuoka Orochi, a Japanese sports car
- Razer Orochi and Orochi V2, mice by Razer
- Orochi (wrestler), masked professional wrestler in Osaka Pro Wrestling
- Pedro Orochi, Brazilian YouTuber
- Orochi, codename of AMD Bulldozer

== Media ==
- Orochi (film), 1925 Japanese film
- Wanpaku Ouji no Orochi Taiji, 1963 Japanese film
- Orochi (manga), 1969 manga by Kazuo Umezu
- Yamata no Orochi no Gyakushū, 1985 Japanese film
- Warriors Orochi, 2007 video game
  - Warriors Orochi 2, 2008 video game
- Yamato Takeru (film), 1994 Japanese film released in some regions as Orochi, the Eight-Headed Dragon

=== Fictional characters ===
- Orochi (The King of Fighters), a character in the video game The King of Fighters
- Orochimaru, a character in the Jiraiya Gōketsu Monogatari folktale
- Orochimaru (Naruto), a character from the Naruto series
- The character class Orochi in the videogame For Honor
- Kurozumi Orochi, a character in the manga One Piece
- The Orochi Group, a fictional corporation in the online game The Secret World
- Monster King Orochi, a monster on One Punch Man
