= Benguela =

- Municipality
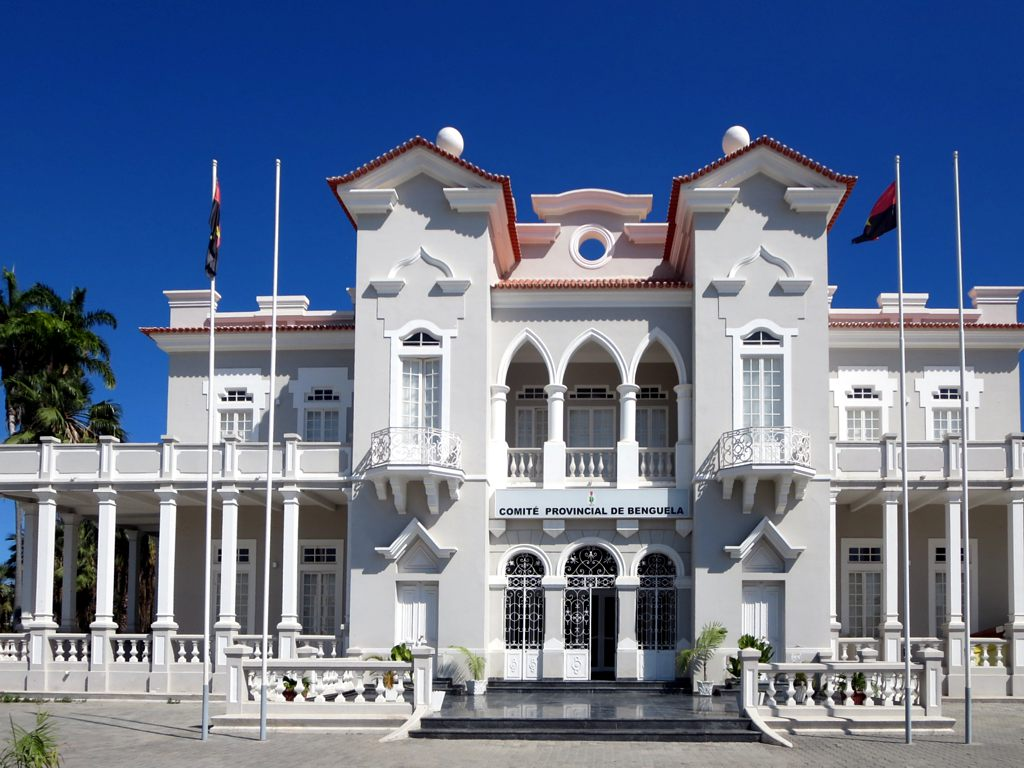
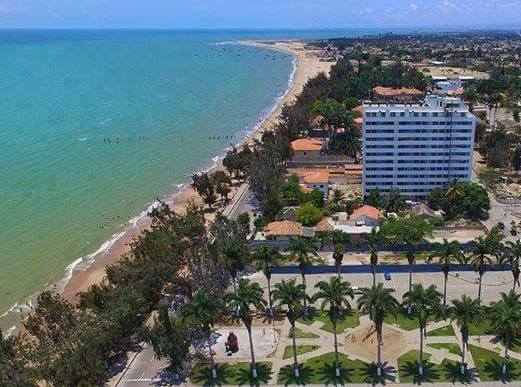
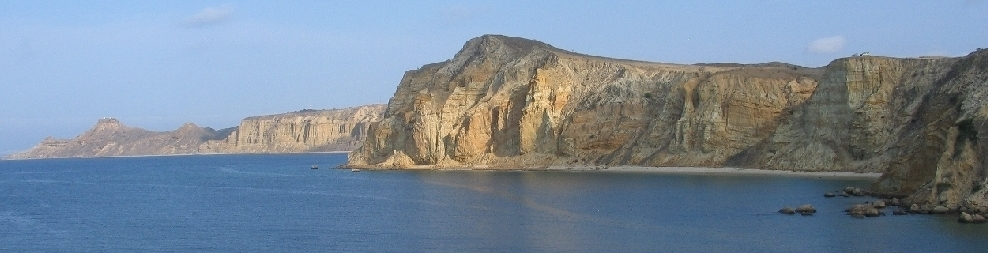
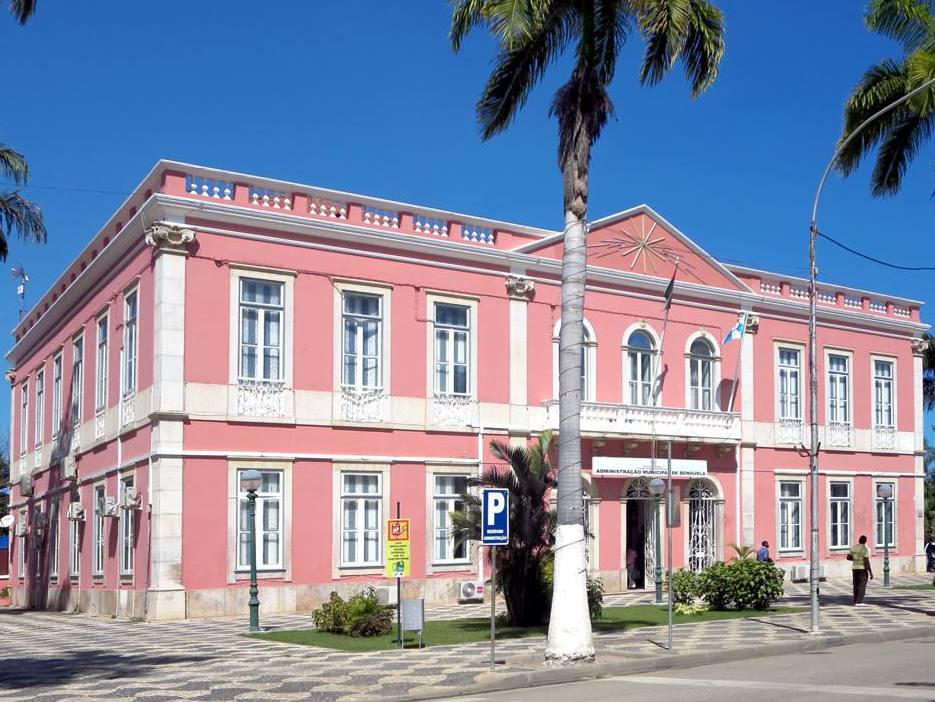
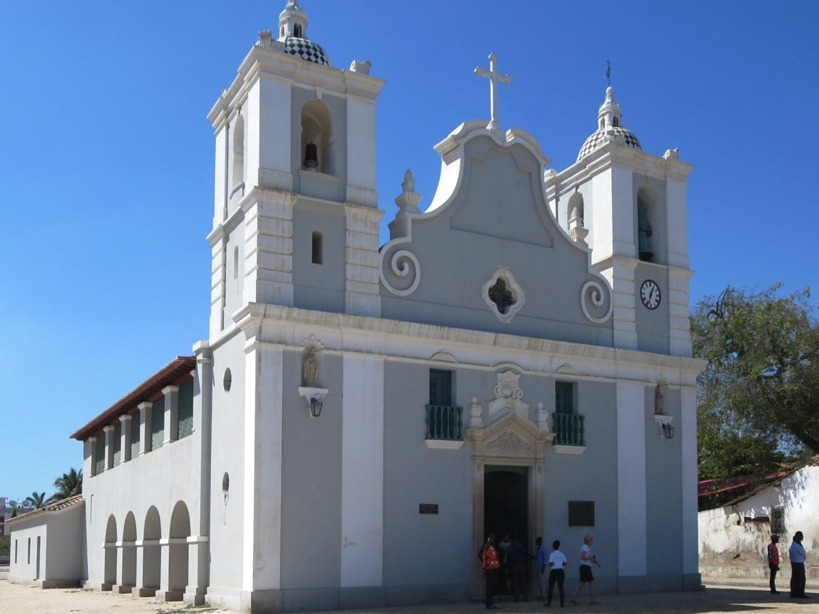

- Location in Angola
- Coordinates: 12°33′S 13°25′E
- Country: Angola
- Admin. division: Benguela Province
- Founded: 1617

Area
  - Total: 2,332 km^{2} (900 sq mi)
- Elevation: 39 m (128 ft)

Population (2014 Census)
  - Total: 561,775
  - Estimate (2022): 692,202
  - Density: 240.9/km^{2} (623.9/sq mi)
- Climate: BWh

Benguela (Portuguese pronunciation: [bẽˈɡɛlɐ]; Umbundu: Luombaka) is a city in western Angola, capital of Benguela Province. Benguela is one of Angola's most populous cities with a population of 555,124 in the city and 561,775 in the municipality, at the 2014 census.

== History ==
=== Portuguese rule ===
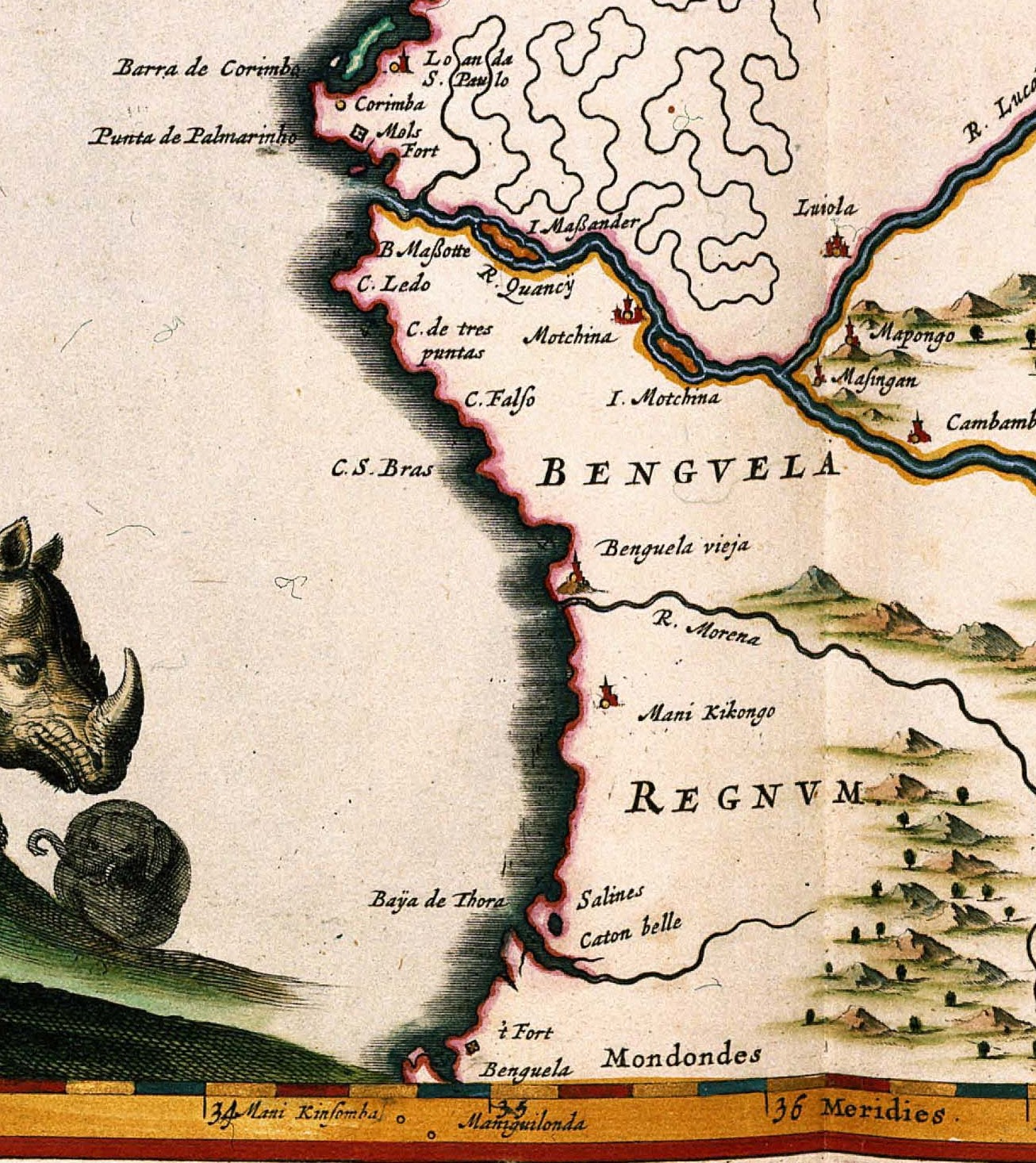
17th century map of Benguela.

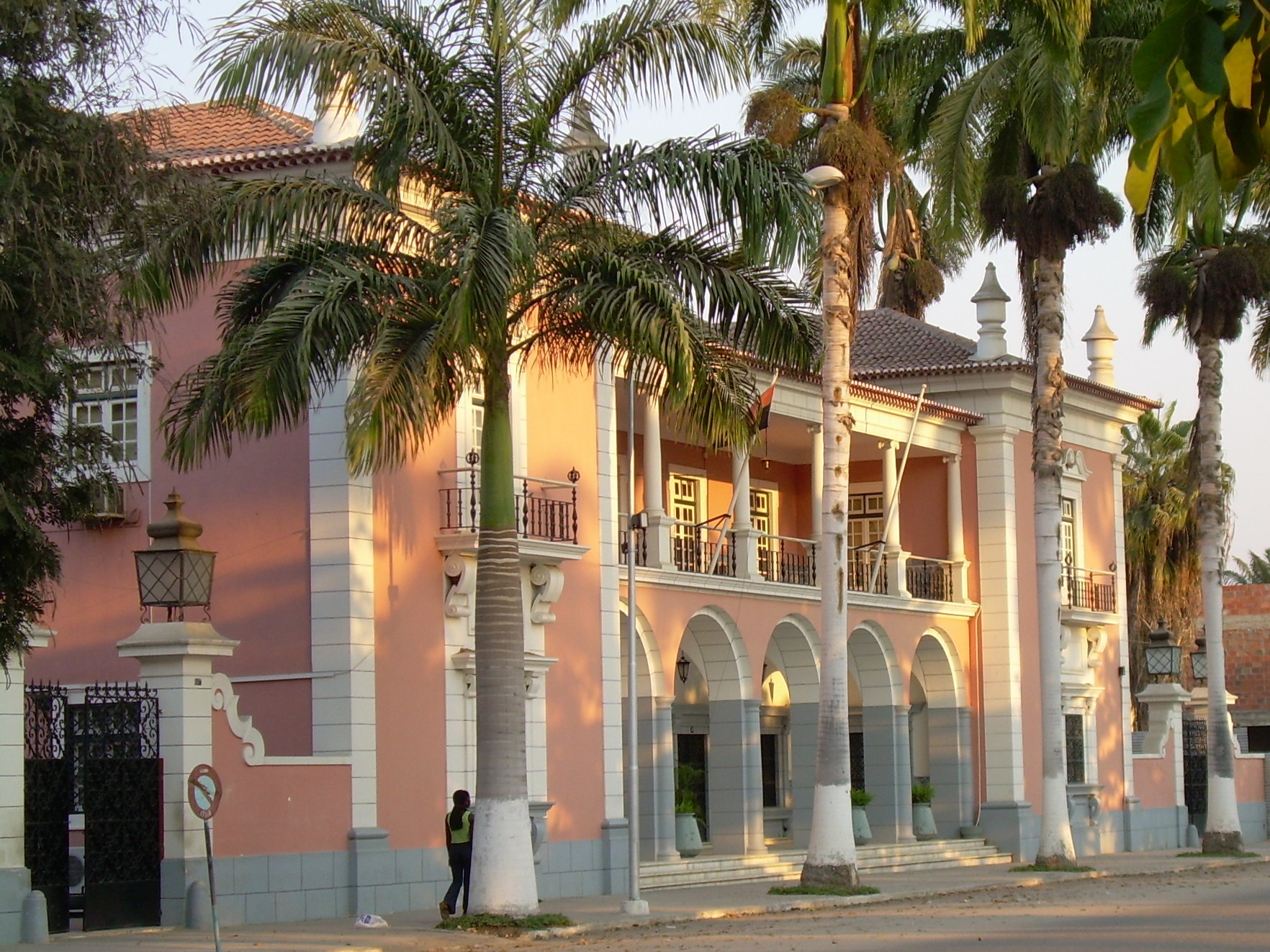
Portuguese colonial architecture in the historic center of Benguela.

Benguela was founded in 1617 as São Felipe de Benguela by the Portuguese under Manuel Cerveira Pereira, 8th Governor of Angola (1604–1607). It was long the centre of an important trade, especially in slaves to Brazil and Cuba. Ships anchored about 1.6 kilometres (1 mi) off the shore, in depths of 7 to 11 metres (23 to 36 ft) and transferred loads to smaller boats which used five or six jetties in the town. However, the nearby deep-water sheltered harbour of Lobito was a much larger port.

Besides the churches of S. Felipe and S. António, the hospital, and the fortress, as of 1911 there were only a few stone-built houses. A short way beyond Benguela is Baía Farta, where salt was manufactured and sulphur was extracted. Close to Baia Farta was the beach of Baia Azul. The city prospered and grew in the following decades.

The Benguela Railway was built in the early 20th century by Portugal to connect the city and Lobito to the interior, and it achieved great success when linked to the Copperbelt of Katanga, DR Congo and Zambia.

Starting in the early 20th century, Benguela attracted, developed, and retained quality businesses and professionals into its growing economy. Sisal and fishing industries expanded and the financial, construction and services market boomed until 1974.

=== Post-independence ===
In 1975, after the April 1974 Carnation Revolution in Lisbon, Portugal, the Portuguese Overseas Province of Angola became independent.

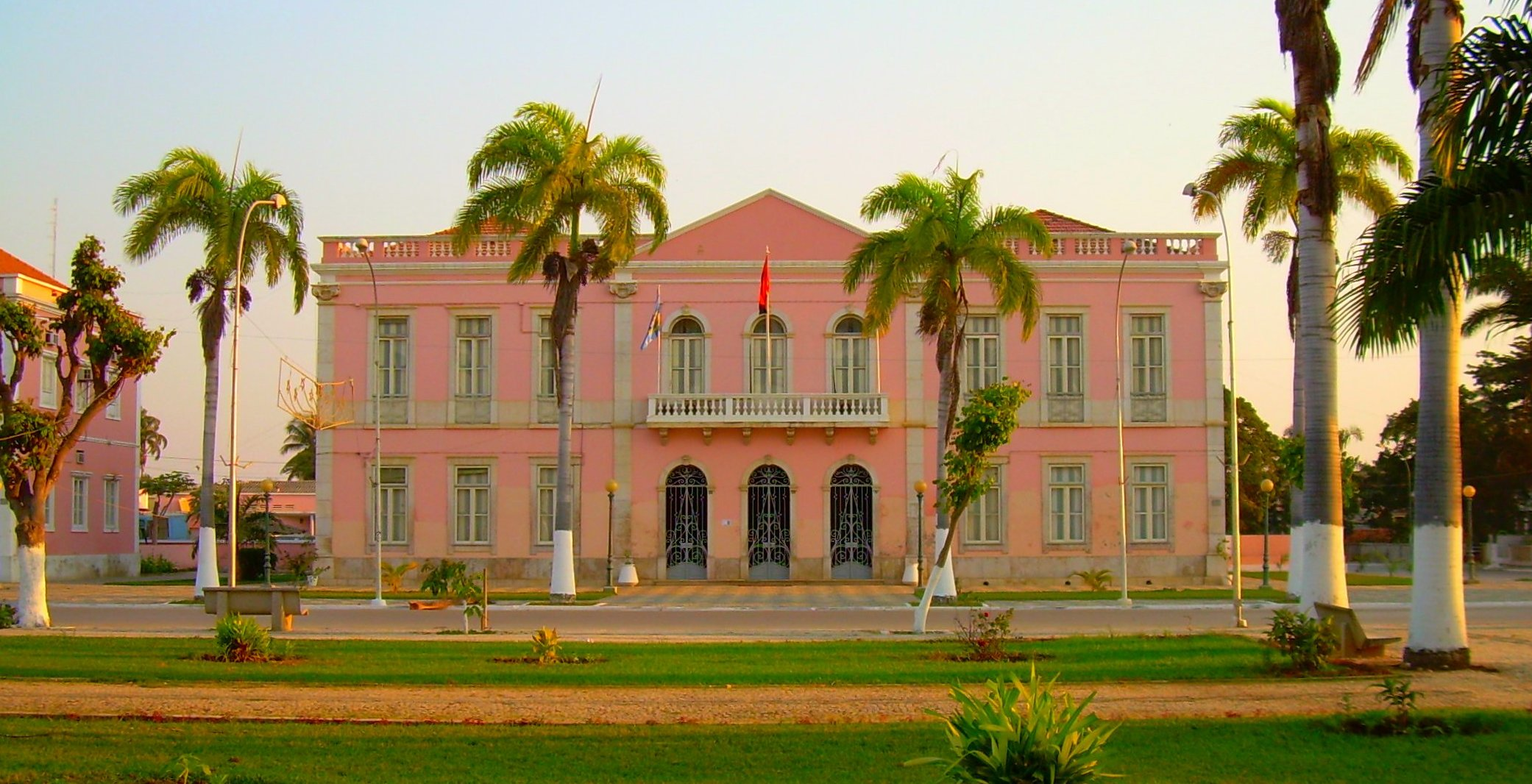
Benguela City Hall.

Due to the Angolan Civil War (1975–2002), which lasted more than 20 years after independence from Portugal, the important Benguela railway line closed, with only the short distance of 30 kilometres (19 mi) between Benguela and Lobito remaining operational. In 1983 Benguela had a population of 155,000. During the civil war the city of Benguela increased its population due to refugees from the countryside.

=== 21st century ===
In the mid-2000s, with a more peaceful environment, restoration of the railway between Benguela and Huambo commenced.

While the colonial part of the city consists of relatively good-quality houses, as of 2011 most of the refugees live in slum areas.

== Transportation ==
Benguela possesses an airport and a railway connection to the rest of Angola and the border with the Democratic Republic of the Congo (DRC), from which it continues on to the city of Tenke and connecting with the south-central section of the Cape-Cairo railway that provides further connections to Zambia, Zimbabwe, Botswana and South Africa.

== Economy ==
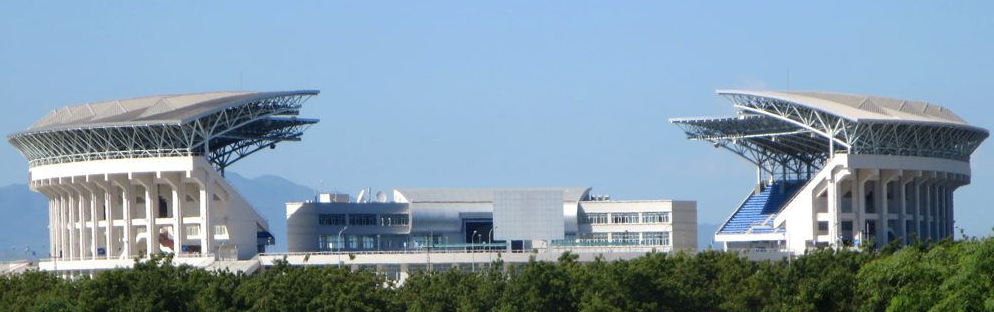
Estádio Nacional de Ombaka.

Benguela was one of the centres of Portuguese trade to the African interior. The city remains an important commercial link between western and eastern Angola. Coffee, corn, sisal, sugarcane, and tobacco are grown in the interior regions of Angola and widely traded in Benguela.

Manganese from the interior is also traded in Benguela. Industries local to the city include fish processing and the milling of sugarcane. The city also produces pottery, soap, and tools.

Foreign trade is handled through the deep-water port of Lobito, which is located 29 kilometres (18 mi) north of Benguela. Lobito, once the busiest port in Angola, was severely disrupted during the Angolan Civil War. The port has since revived and supports trade in the Benguela region.

== Education ==
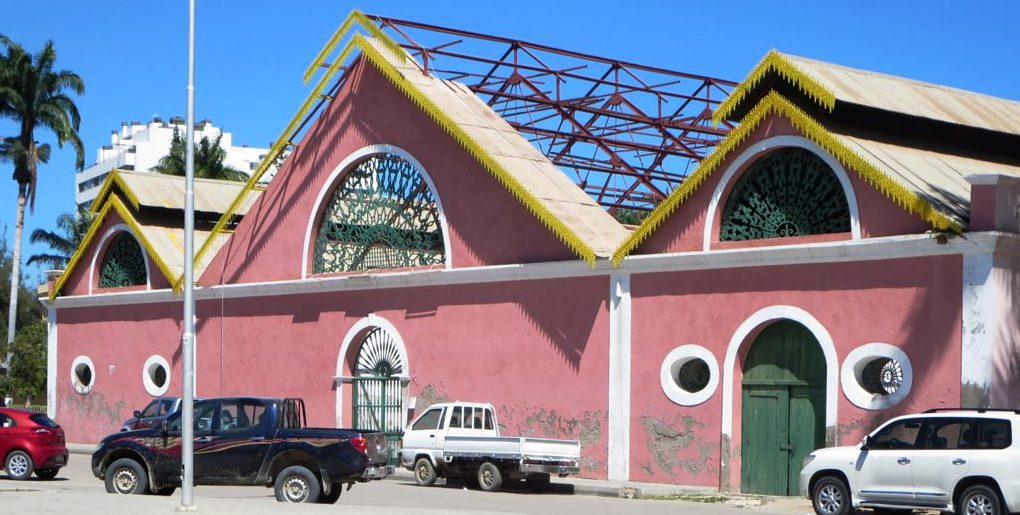
Archaeological Museum.

The Universidade Katyavala Bwila and Ruvandro Ferreira was founded in 2009.

== Culture ==
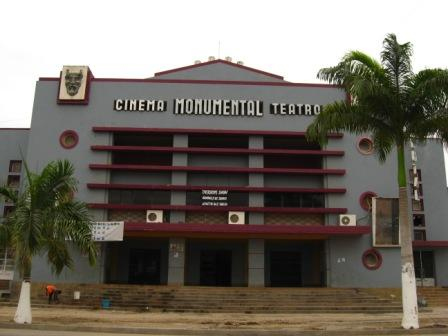
Teatro Monumental.

=== Religion ===
Among the places of worship, they are predominantly Christian churches and temples :

- Roman Catholic Diocese of Benguela (Catholic Church)
- Evangelical Congregational Church in Angola (World Communion of Reformed Churches)
- Evangelical Reformed Church in Angola (World Communion of Reformed Churches)
- Baptist Convention of Angola (Baptist World Alliance)
- Universal Church of the Kingdom of God, Assemblies of God.

== Notable residents ==
- Maria Araújo Kahn (born 1963/1964), judge of the United States Court of Appeals for the Second Circuit
- Leila Lopes (born 1986), Miss Angola 2010 and Miss Universe 2011
- Matias Damásio (born 1982), musician
- Luís Sá Silva (born 1990), racing driver
