= Fishing industry in Angola =

Fishing in Angola is mainly performed by foreign fleets. Some of the foreign fishing fleets operating in Angolan waters were required by the government to land a portion of their catch at Angolan ports to increase the local supply of fish. Fishing agreements of this kind were reached with several countries, including with Spain, Japan, and Italy.

== History ==
=== Portuguese Angola ===
Fishing in Angola was a major and growing industry before independence from Portugal in 1975. In the early 1970s, there were about 700 fishing boats, and the annual catch was more than 300,000 tons. Including the catch of foreign fishing fleets in Portuguese Angola's waters, the combined annual catch was estimated at over 1 million tons. Moçâmedes together with Luanda, Benguela and Lobito were the major fishing ports.

=== Independence and civil war period ===
Following independence and into the late 1980s, however, Angola's fishing industry had fallen into disarray, the result of the flight of the local white ethnic Portuguese professional fishermen and fishing industry entrepreneurs. After the April 1974 military coup in Lisbon, as the Portuguese Overseas Province of Angola's political situation deteriorated and the independence of the territory seemed inevitable, many fishing boats departed to Portugal with entire crews and their families. By 1986 only 70 of the 143 fishing boats in Moçâmedes (then called Namibe), the port that normally handled two-thirds of the Angolan catch before independence, were operable. Furthermore, most of the fish-processing factories were in need of repair. Once an exporter of fish meal, by 1986 Angola had insufficient supplies for its own market.

Some of the foreign fishing fleets operating in Angolan waters were required by the government to land a portion of their catch at Angolan ports to increase the local supply of fish. Fishing agreements of this kind had been reached with the Soviet Union, which operated the largest number of boats in Angolan waters, and with Spain, Japan, and Italy. Spain also agreed to help rehabilitate the Angolan fishing industry in exchange for fishing rights. In other cases, the government allowed foreign fleets to export their entire catch in exchange for license fees.

In the mid-1980s, the government began rehabilitating the fishing industry, especially in Namibe and Benguela provinces. The first priority was to replace and repair aging equipment. To accomplish this goal, the government was receiving a significant amount of foreign assistance. In 1987, the EEC announced plans to provide funds to help rebuild the Dack Doy shipyards and two canning plants in Tombua. Spain sold Angola thirty-seven steel-hull boats for US$70 million, and fourteen modern fishing boats were on order from Italy.

=== After 2002 ===
From 2002 onward, with the end of the Angolan Civil War, increased safety, and the growing state revenue with oil, diamonds and other natural resource exploitation, Angola started a period of reconstruction and economic development. The fishing sector was gradually expanded and modernized and the enlargement of a newly created middle-class in the capital city, Luanda, widened and improved the fish consumption market in the country.

== Recreational fishing ==
Angola is considered one of the best places in the world to catch Atlantic tarpon. Angola is also considered to be one of the best places in the world to catch Sailfish.

== See also ==
- Agriculture in Angola
