= Baptista Miranda =

Angolan YouTuber and digital influencer (born 2002)

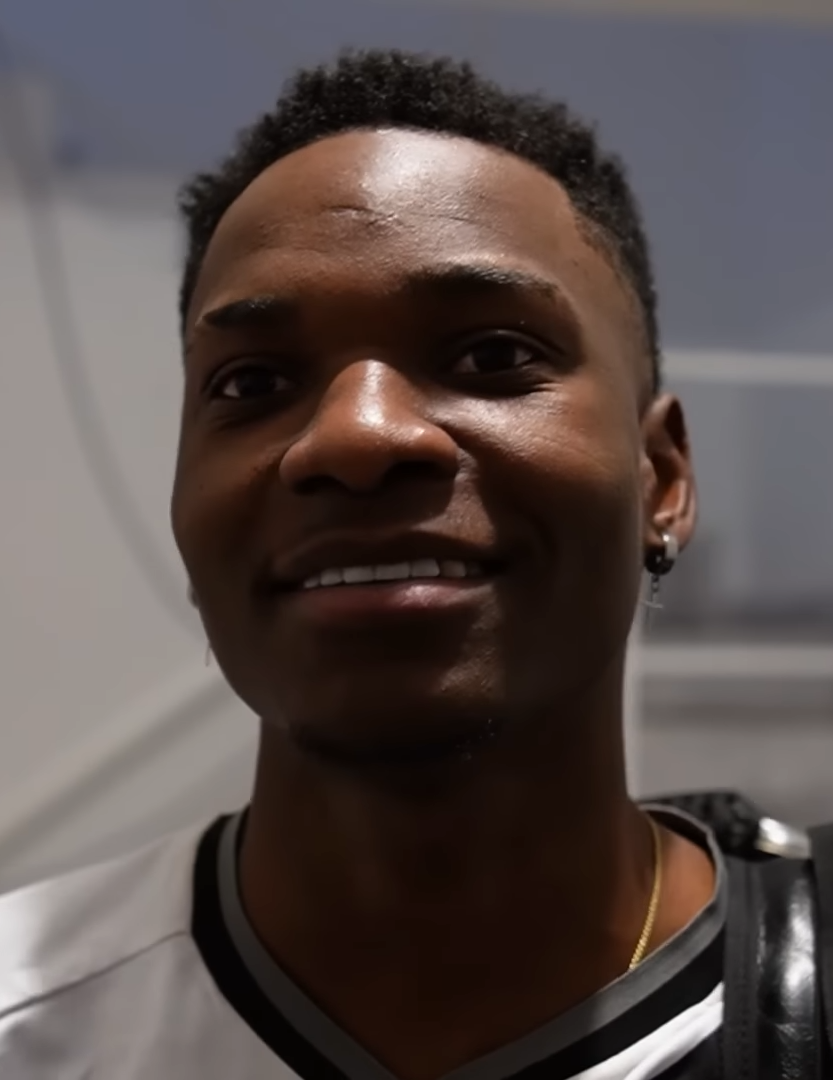
- Baptista Miranda in 2023
- Born: Baptista José Miranda; 28 April 2002 (age 24); Lobito, Angola
- Years active: 2017–present

YouTube information
- Channel: Baptista Miranda
- Subscribers: 1.38 million
- Views: 195 million
- Last updated: 5 April 2026

Baptista José Miranda (Lobito, April 28, 2002) is an Angolan YouTuber and digital influencer. He is considered the biggest influencer in Angola, although he mainly produces content for a Brazilian audience.

== Career ==
Born in Lobito, Benguela, Baptista created his first YouTube channel in 2017, where he made computer tutorial videos, even though he didn't master the subject. Baptista lost the channel that same year. On April 20, 2018, he created a new channel. Inspired by the Mozambican YouTuber Marcelino, who had created a video identifying the main differences between Mozambique and Brazil, Baptista decided to publish a video about the differences between Angola and Brazil. According to him, the Brazilian public started following him from 2019 onwards, when he began making content on the street, asking Angolans for their opinions about Brazilians.

In 2020, his popularity increased after being invited to appear in a video by Brazilian YouTuber Orochinho, becoming "the representative YouTuber of Angola in Brazil". According to Baptista, he did not achieve as much success producing videos for Angolans compared to when he started making videos for Brazilians. Baptista considers Júlio Cocielo, Whindersson Nunes, Lucas Fumba, Felipe Neto, Maicon Küster, and Orochinho as his biggest influences. Amidst his popularity, he was noticed by Felipe Neto and the Flow Podcast, being invited by Igor 3K to record an episode. Subsequently, he received a one-year contract offer from the podcast, which Baptista accepted, moving from Angola to Brazil, to São Paulo.
