= Agriculture in Angola =

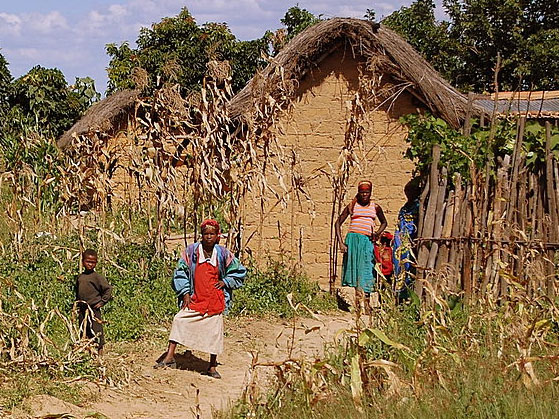
Angolan honey farmers

Angola is a potentially rich agricultural country, with fertile soils, a favourable climate, and about 57.4 million ha of agricultural land, including more than 5.0 million ha of arable land. Before independence from Portugal in 1975, Angola had a flourishing tradition of family-based farming and was self-sufficient in all major food crops except wheat. The country exported coffee and maize, as well as crops such as sisal, bananas, tobacco and cassava. By the 1990s Angola produced less than 1% the volume of coffee it had produced in the early 1970s, while production of cotton, tobacco and sugar cane had ceased almost entirely. Poor global market prices and lack of investment have severely limited the sector since independence.

The Angolan Civil War (1975–2002) and the consequent deterioration of the rural economy and neglect of the farming sector dealt the final blow to the country's agricultural productivity. During the civil war most small-scale farmers reverted to subsistence farming. Angola has been dependent on commercial imports since 1977 and was heavily dependent up to the end of the war. The agriculture of Angola is currently expanding due to the end of the Angolan Civil War in 2002, and the growth of foreign investment in the sector. However, the return to productivity in rural areas is proving difficult and slow. Large areas cannot be cultivated because of landmines. Functioning infrastructure in rural areas is limited, and few incentives exist for people to return to farming. From 2003 to 2004 only 2.9 million ha of the available agricultural land was cultivated. Agriculture's contribution to gross domestic product (GDP) – including forestry and fisheries – has been about 8%. Yet two thirds of the population still depend on agriculture for food, income and employment. About 80% of farmers throughout the country are smallholders. They cultivate very small plots of land, with very low agricultural productivity.

== Production ==
Angola has the ninth highest proportion of women working in agriculture, forestry and fishing in the world.

Angola produced, in 2018:

- 8.6 million tons of cassava (9th largest producer in the world);
- 3.5 million tons of banana (7th largest producer in the world, or the 10th largest, if we consider together with plantain);
- 2.2 million tons of maize;
- 1.2 million tons of sweet potato (10th largest producer in the world);
- 721 thousand tons of potato;
- 597 thousand tons of pineapple (13th largest producer in the world);
- 572 thousand tons of sugarcane;
- 355 thousand tons of cabbage;
- 314 thousand tons of beans;
- 280 thousand tons of palm oil;
- 154 thousand tons of peanut;

In addition to smaller productions of other agricultural products, like coffee (16 thousand tons).

== History ==
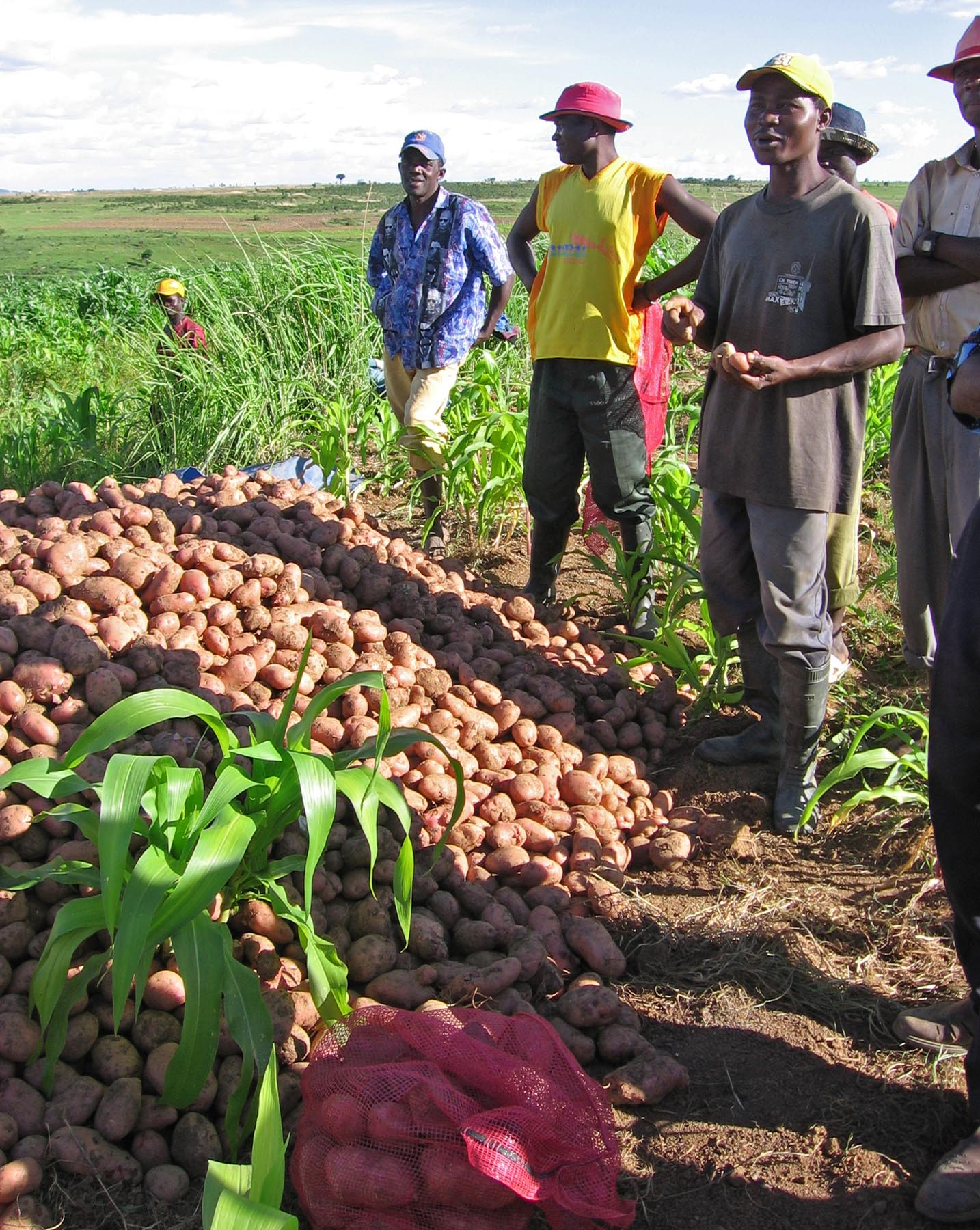
Angolan sweet potato farmers, 2011

By the end of the colonial period, a variety of crops and livestock were produced in Angola. In the north, cassava, coffee, and cotton were grown; in the central highlands, maize was cultivated; and in the south, where rainfall is lowest, cattle herding was prevalent. In addition, large plantations run by primarily Portuguese commercial farmers produced palm oil, sugarcane, bananas, and sisal. Peasant farmers also produced these crops and who sold their surplus to local Portuguese traders in exchange for supplies. The commercial farmers dominated the marketing for these crops, however, and enjoyed substantial support from the colonial government in the form of technical assistance, irrigation facilities, and financial credit. They produced the great majority of the crops that were marketed in the cities or exported.

Before 1975, Angola had a flourishing tradition of family-based farming and was self-sufficient in all major food crops except wheat. The country exported coffee and maize, as well as crops such as sisal, bananas, tobacco and cassava. By the 1990s, Angola was producing less than 1% of the volume of coffee it had produced in the early 1970s, while production of cotton, tobacco and sugar cane had ceased almost entirely. Poor global market prices and lack of investment severely limited the sector after independence. The Angolan Civil War (1975-2002) and the consequent deterioration of the rural economy and neglect of the farming sector dealt the final blow to the country's agricultural productivity.

The departure of Portuguese farmers and traders from rural Angola after independence undermined agricultural productivity. In response the government set up state farms on land formerly owned by the Portuguese and established the Emprêsa Nacional de Comercialização e Distribuição de Produtos Agrícolas – Encodipa (National Company for the Marketing and Distribution of Agricultural Products) to maintain the rural trading system. Neither measure however, was successful, and by 1984 the government started phasing out the state farms and turning production over to individual farmers. In December 1985, the government also put most rural trade back into private hands. To help peasant farmers, the government established agricultural development stations and provided bank credits for small-scale agricultural projects. Several hundred state farms were to be turned over to associations of tenant farmers as an embryonic form of cooperative. The association would buy or rent tools for shared use, share marketing initiatives to strengthen prices, and share transport. By the end of 1985, the Directorate of Farm Marketing controlled 4,638 farm cooperatives and 6,534 farmers' associations; but of these, only 93 cooperatives and 71 associations were operational.

In the late 1980s, the country faced serious problems in resuscitating agricultural production. By 1988 the departure of the Portuguese, rural depopulation, and the physical isolation of the farming areas had almost totally halted commercial production of such cash crops as coffee and sisal, as well as the subsistence production of cereals. Production was stagnating because of marketing and transport difficulties; shortages of seed, fertilizer, and consumer goods for trade with peasant farmers; and the impact of the war on planting, harvesting, and yields. Land mines and fear of attacks had forced peasants to reduce the areas under cultivation, especially the fields far from their villages, and to abandon hope of harvesting some planted areas. Moreover, the internal migration of peasants to safer areas had resulted in the over-cultivation and decreased yields.

Despite these obstacles, there were some successes. The relatively secure Huíla Province maintained a fair level of production, and the reorientation of government policy away from inefficient state farms and toward peasant producers promised to provide services to and boost production by peasant farmers. By the end of 1987, there were twenty-five development stations providing services to peasant producers in ten provinces, and four more were being set up.

== Coffee ==
Nowhere has the decline in agricultural production been more dramatic than in the coffee sector. Formerly Angola's leading export, by 1985 coffee exports had dropped to 8% of their 1973 level. Under colonial rule, about 2,500 large commercial farms and 250,000 peasants were involved in growing coffee. During the 1975-76 fighting, the owners, managers, and skilled technicians, as well as most of the migrant work force, abandoned the coffee estates, which were then nationalized. Suffering from a lack of skilled management and shortages of available labor in the rural areas, these coffee farms have continually posted losses. By 1985 the thirty-four state coffee companies produced only 8,890 tons of coffee and depended on government subsidies to stay in business. The government marketed only 4,700 tons from peasant producers in that year.

In 1983 the government adopted an emergency program to revive the coffee industry. Local coffee companies, rather than the National Coffee Company (Emprêsa Nacional de Café—Encafe), were given the responsibility of running the state coffee farms, and, to encourage greater efficiency, the area under cultivation was reduced to less than one-fifth of the area abandoned by the large commercial coffee growers at independence. Aid for these efforts has been obtained from the French Central Board for Economic Cooperation (Caisse Centrale de Coopération Economique – CCCE) and two UN organizations, the WFP and the Food and Agriculture Organization (FAO). The WFP was furnished with US$14.3 million on a five-year (1983–87) plan to pay coffee workers in food rather than in local currency in order to discourage worker absenteeism, one of the industry's most serious problems. In addition, the government, as part of its program of economic liberalization, was in the process of turning over the marketing of coffee to local, rather than national, organizations.

Despite these efforts, however, in 1985 state coffee farms still had only about 50% of the required work force because of the general drain of rural depopulation and of the unattractive wages, paid in nearly-worthless kwanzas. The industry was still plagued by the UNITA insurgency, whose attacks had inflicted over US$4 million worth of damage on coffee plantations by 1985. Other problems encountered on the coffee plantations mirrored the general deterioration of the economic infrastructure. High charges for transportation of coffee and machinery and lack of facilities for hulling the coffee slowed and increased the cost of the entire production process. Some plantation managers complained that their workers were not productive, not only because of absenteeism but also because of their advanced age.

The decline in coffee exports in the mid-1980s resulted largely from the depletion of stocks that had earlier cushioned exports as production declined. Exports to members of the International Coffee Organization (ICO) have remained fairly stable since 1983, but exports to non-ICO members, of which East Germany has been by far the most important market in the late 1980s, have declined. The fall in sales to the non-ICO market has eroded coffee earnings because these sales have traditionally been at substantially higher prices than those to ICO members. Exacerbating the decline in production and exports has been the depressed world market for coffee; from February 1986 to August 1987, ICO indicator prices dropped by more than 20%.

== Food crops and livestock ==
The decline in marketed food crop production and the rapid growth of the urban population have caused a food crisis in the cities. By the mid-1980s, urban dwellers depended almost entirely on cereal imports, and the approximately 600,000 rural displaced persons were completely dependent on food aid from foreign donors. Local production of cereals met only half the national requirement in 1986 and totaled only about 300,000 tons – about 60% of the yearly average in the mid-1970s. Decreased production was the result of general problems associated with the war, including deteriorating transportation and a lack of market incentives for peasant producers. By the late 1980s, malnutrition was widespread.

Similarly, livestock production has declined. Both cattle and pigs are raised, but production fell from 36,500 tons slaughtered in 1973 to only 5,000 tons in the early 1980s. This tremendous decrease was the result of a combination of factors, including the departure of the commercial farmers, increasing disruption from the war and the deterioration of facilities and services, especially vaccinations, crucial for livestock production. As of 2020, Angola's cattle stock reached 5.12 million heads. In the previous year, 5.08 million heads of cattle were kept for breeding or raised either for meat or dairy production. In general, the Angolan cattle stock has increased since 2010. That year, there were roughly 4.5 million cattle heads in the country.

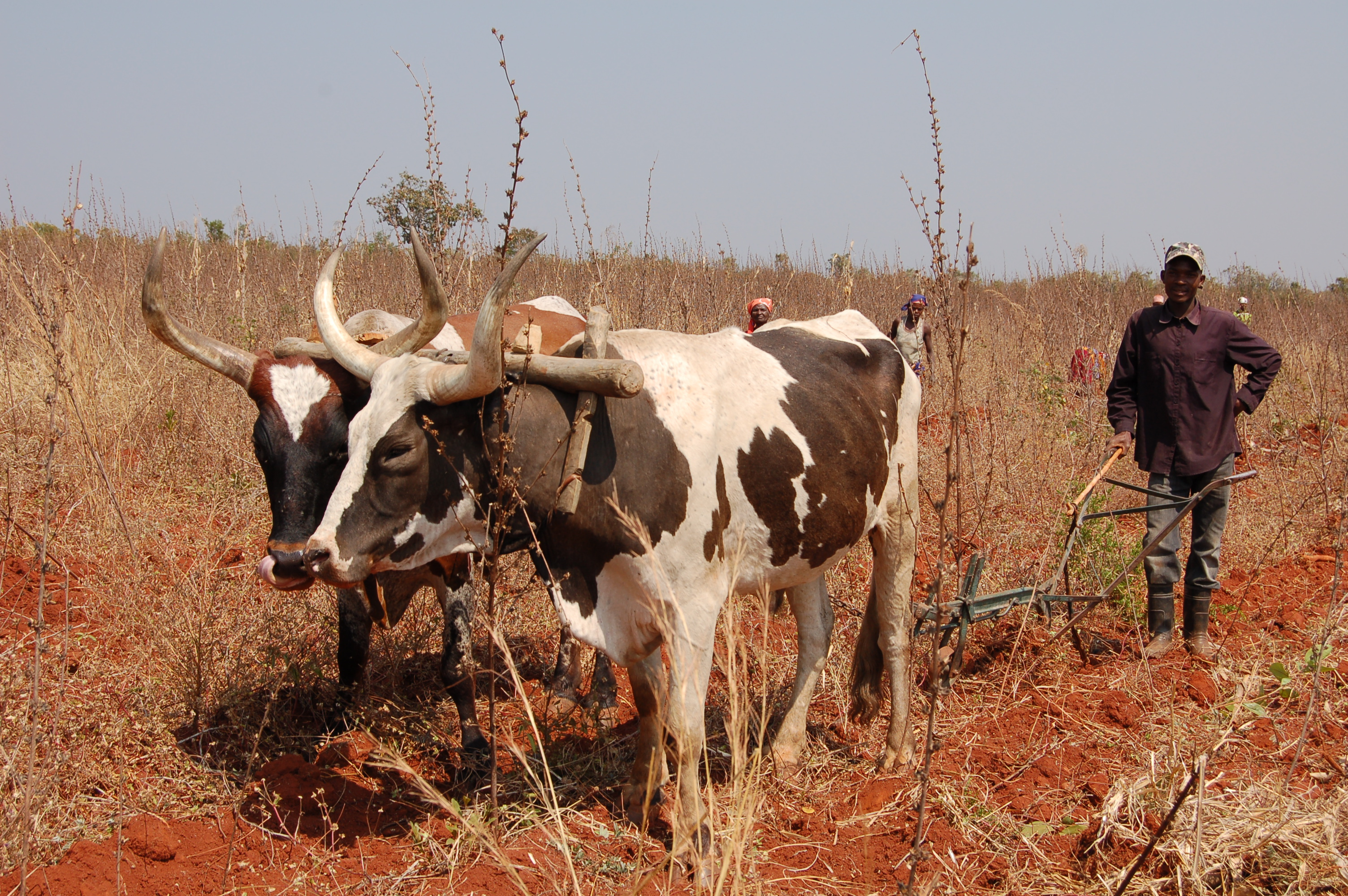
Oxen under plow

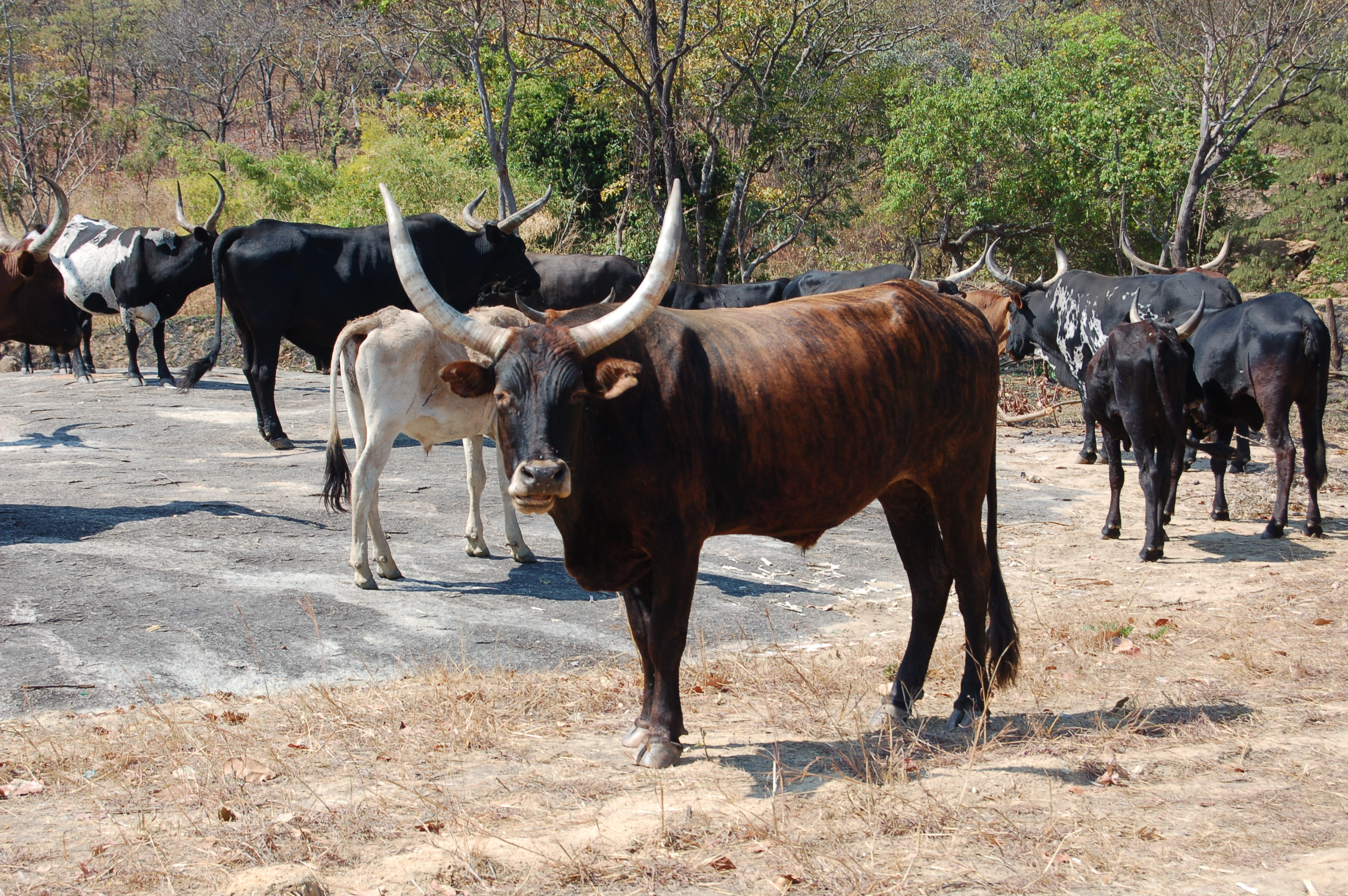
Oxen being watered

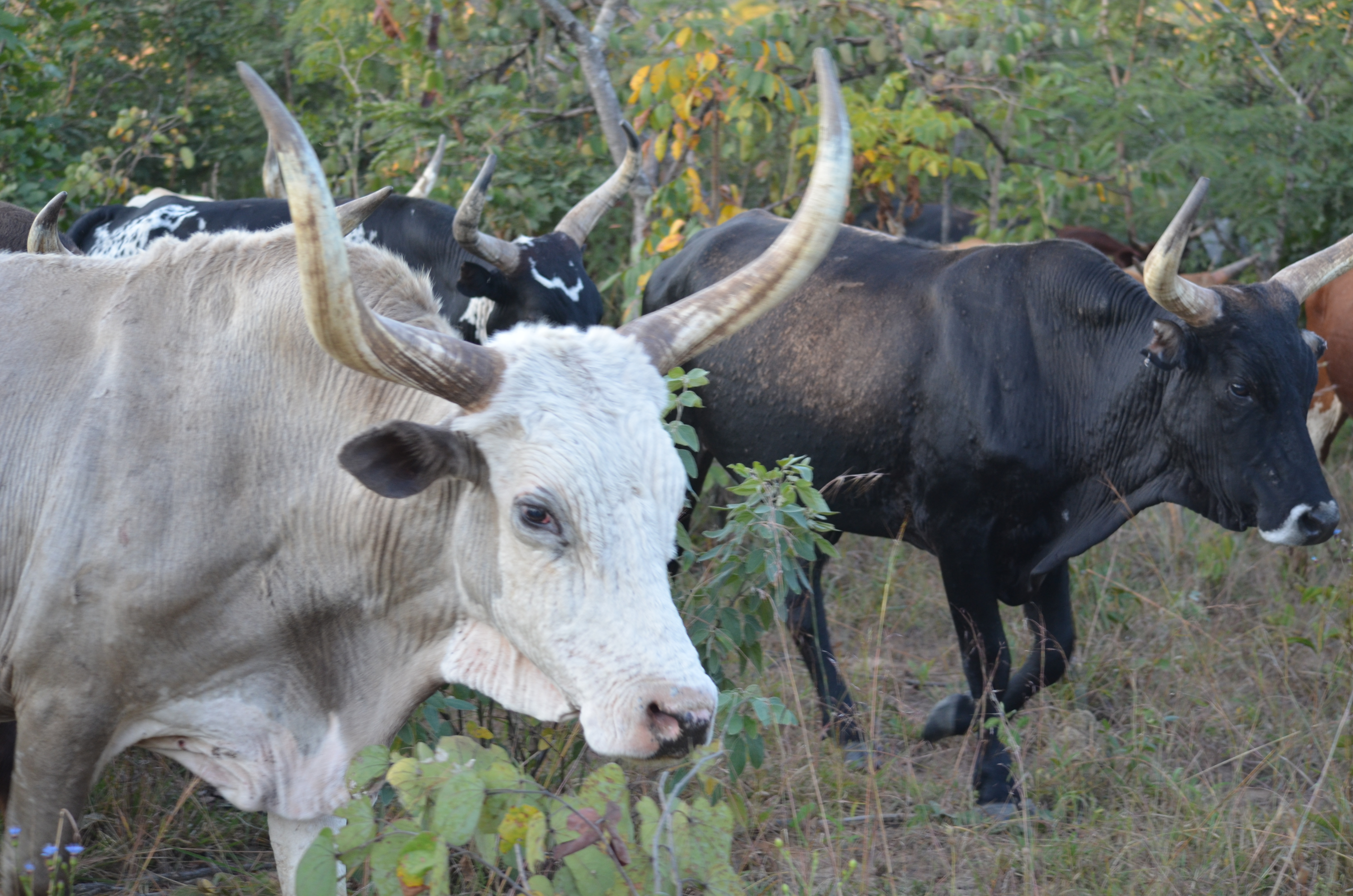
Oxen coming home after grazing

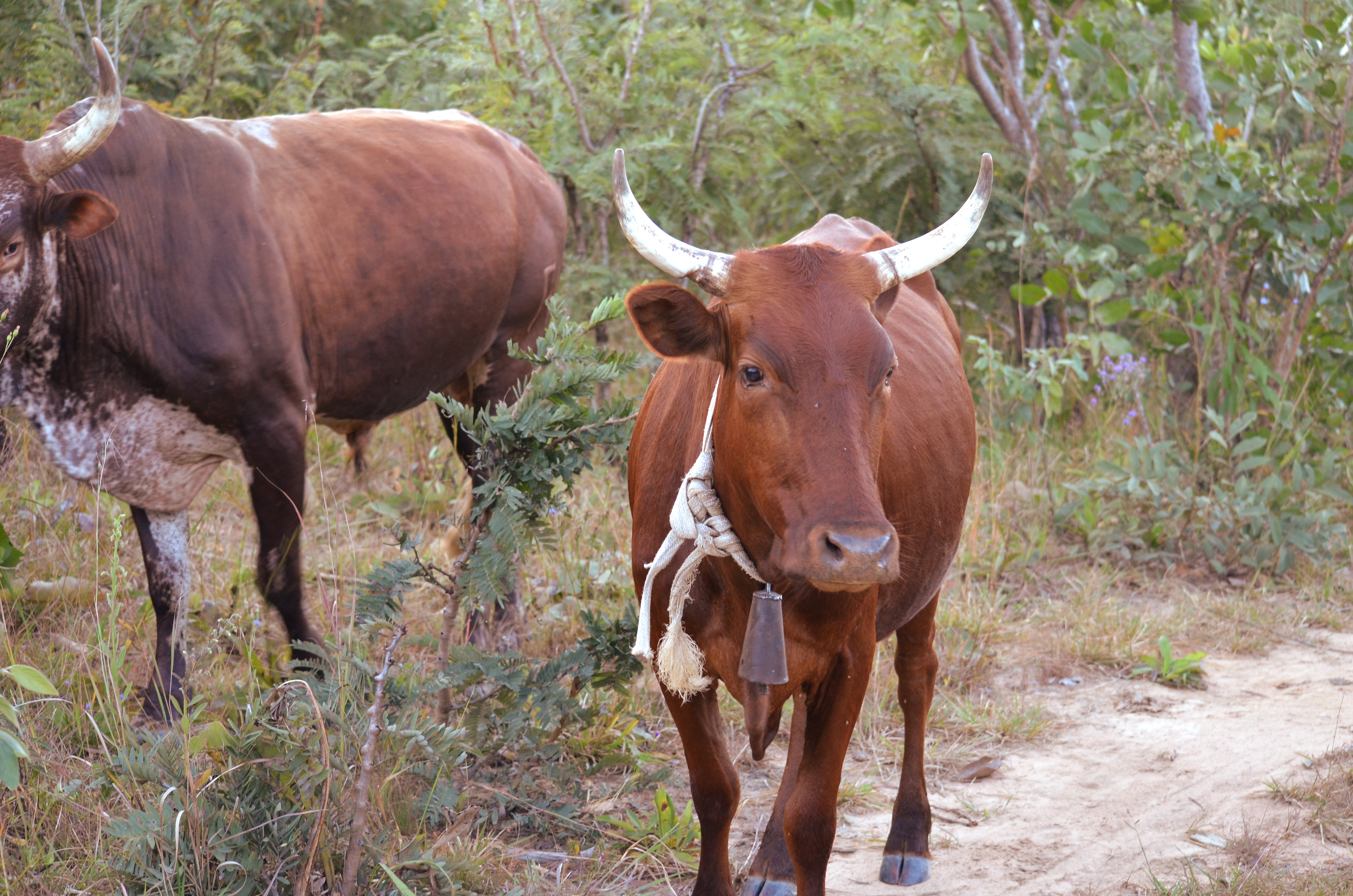
Oxen coming home after grazing

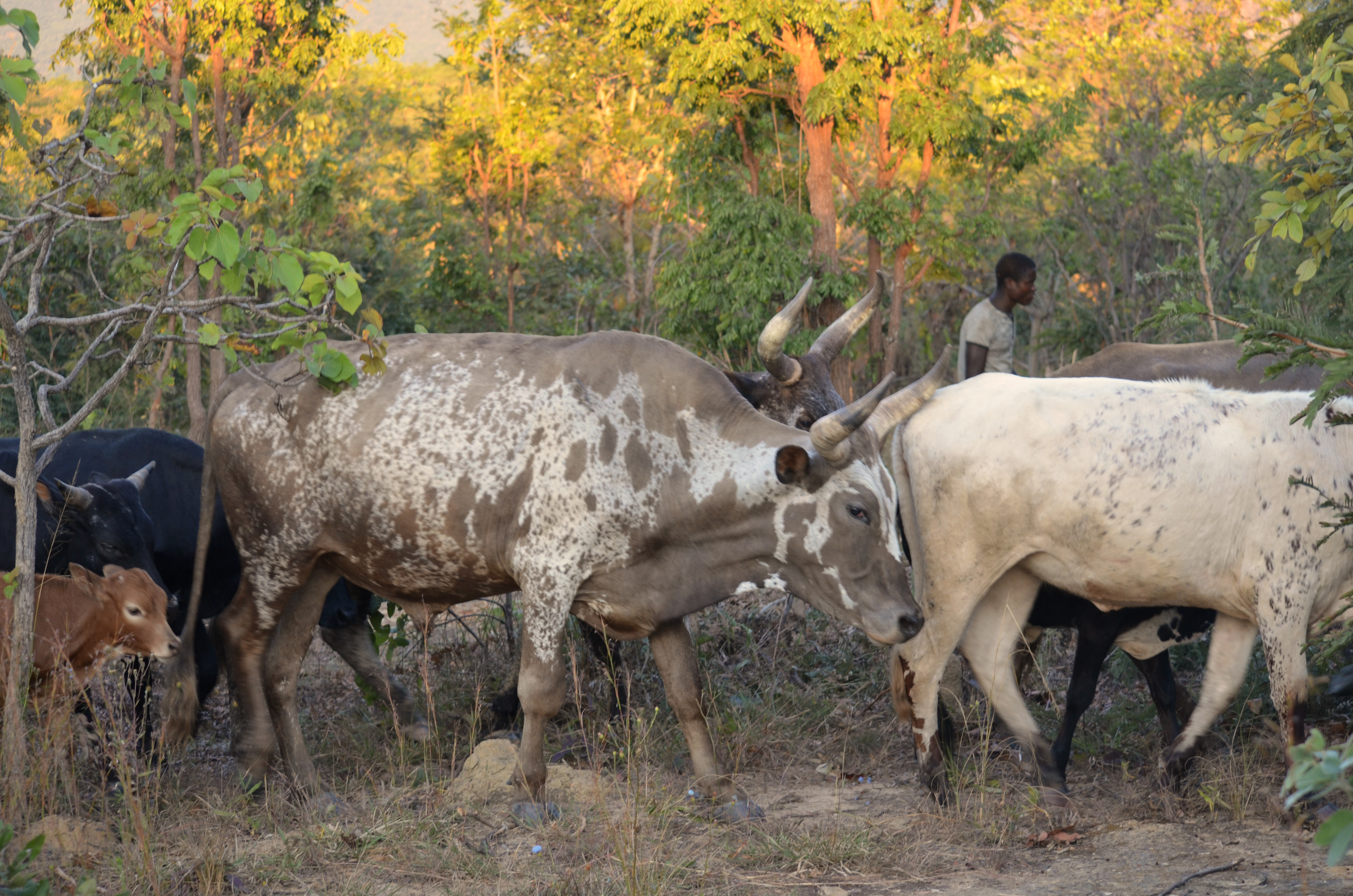
Oxen coming home after grazing

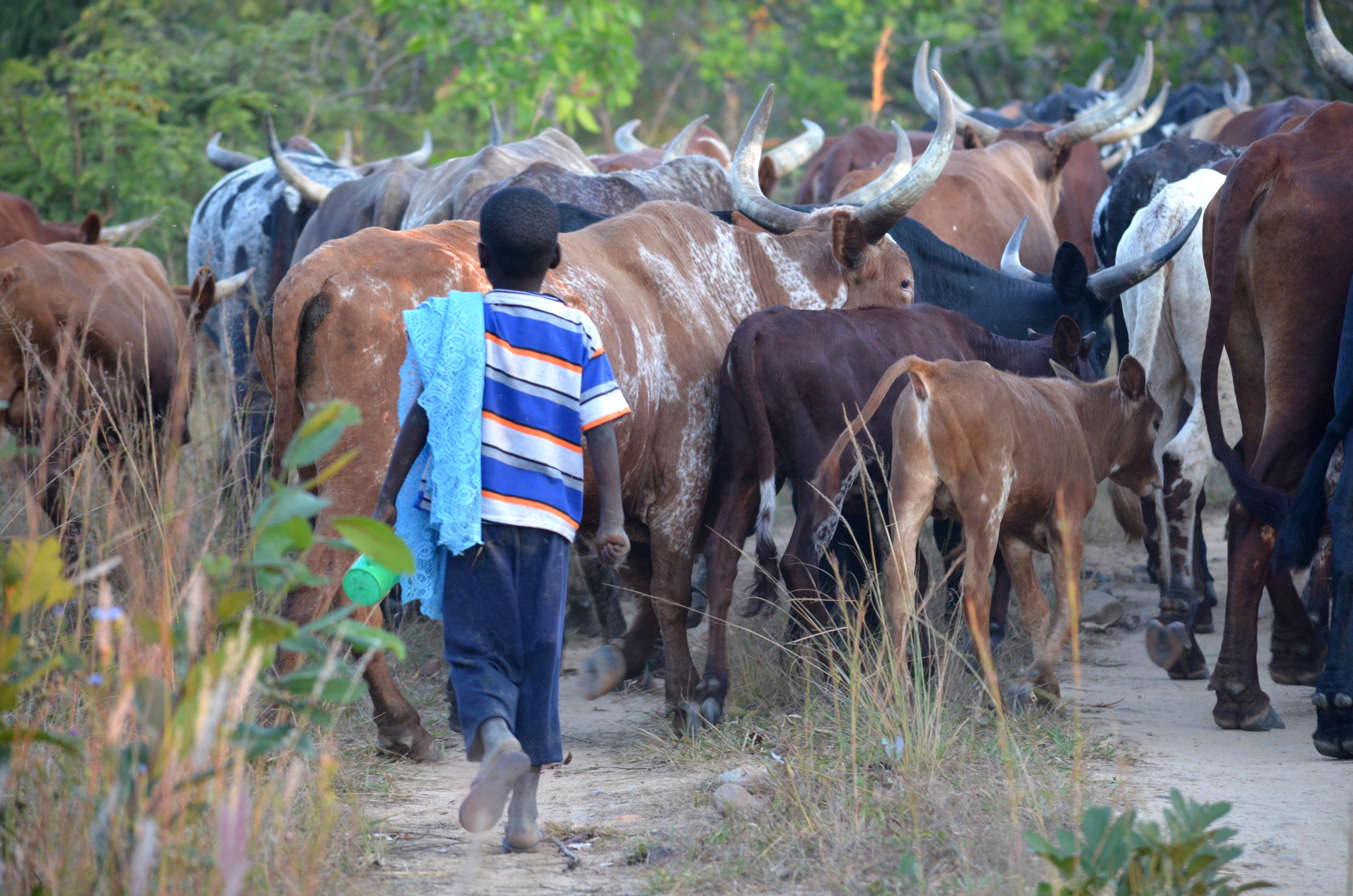
A young herdsman learns his trade

== See also ==
- Forestry in Angola
- Fishing in Angola
- Land tenure in Angola
