= Baía Azul =

Beach in Angola

- Beach
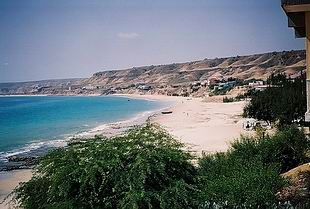
- Interactive map of Baía Azul
- Coordinates: 12°37′20.68″S 13°13′59.31″E
- Location: Benguela Province, Angla
- Water bodies: Atlantic Ocean

Baía Azul (English: Blue Bay) is a beach in the south of Benguela Province in Angola. It is situated south of Praia Morena beach. It owes its name to the blue waters that glisten from a light green to a navy blue. Baía Azul is considered "the mother" of the beaches in Benguela. Its unique and incomparable beauty and its sport fishing conditions make it a popular tourist attraction.
