= Lobito =

- Municipality
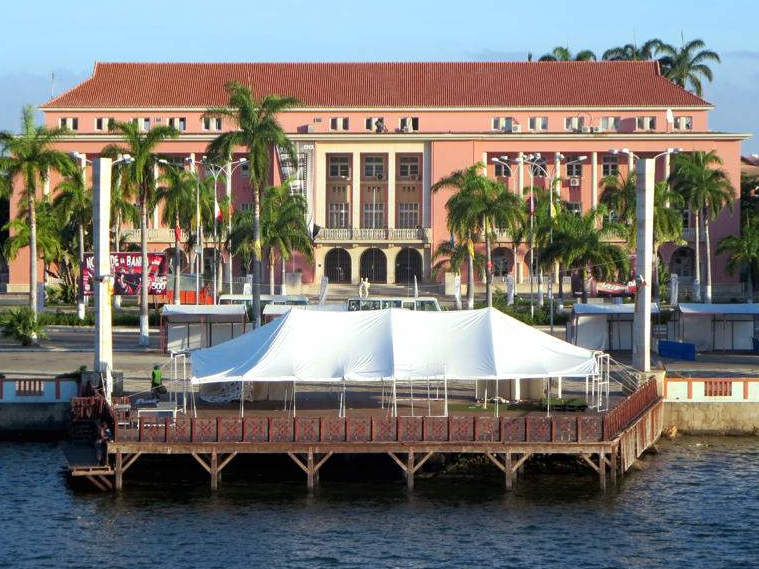
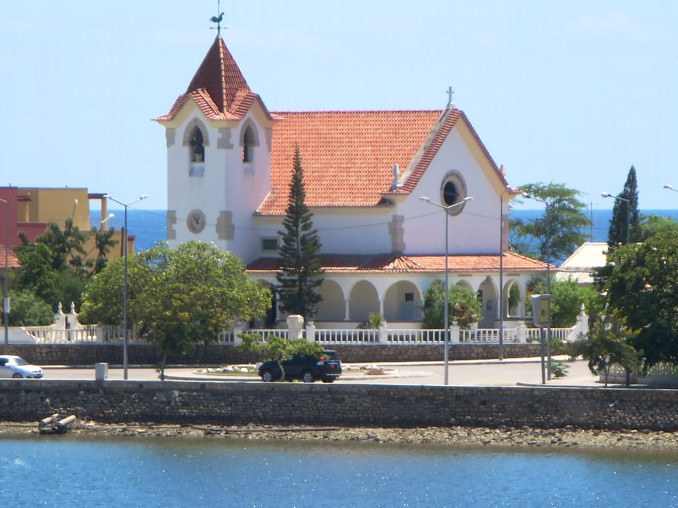
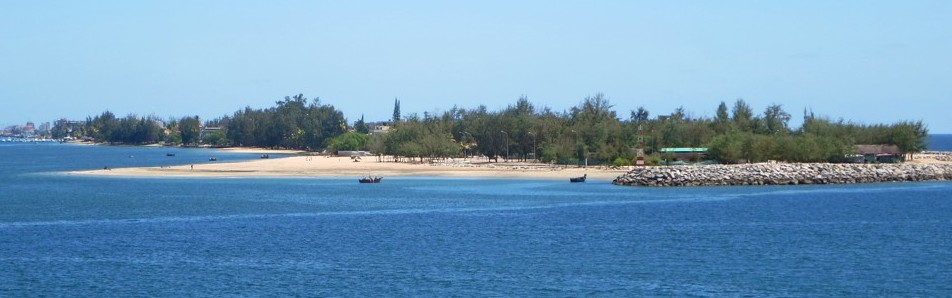
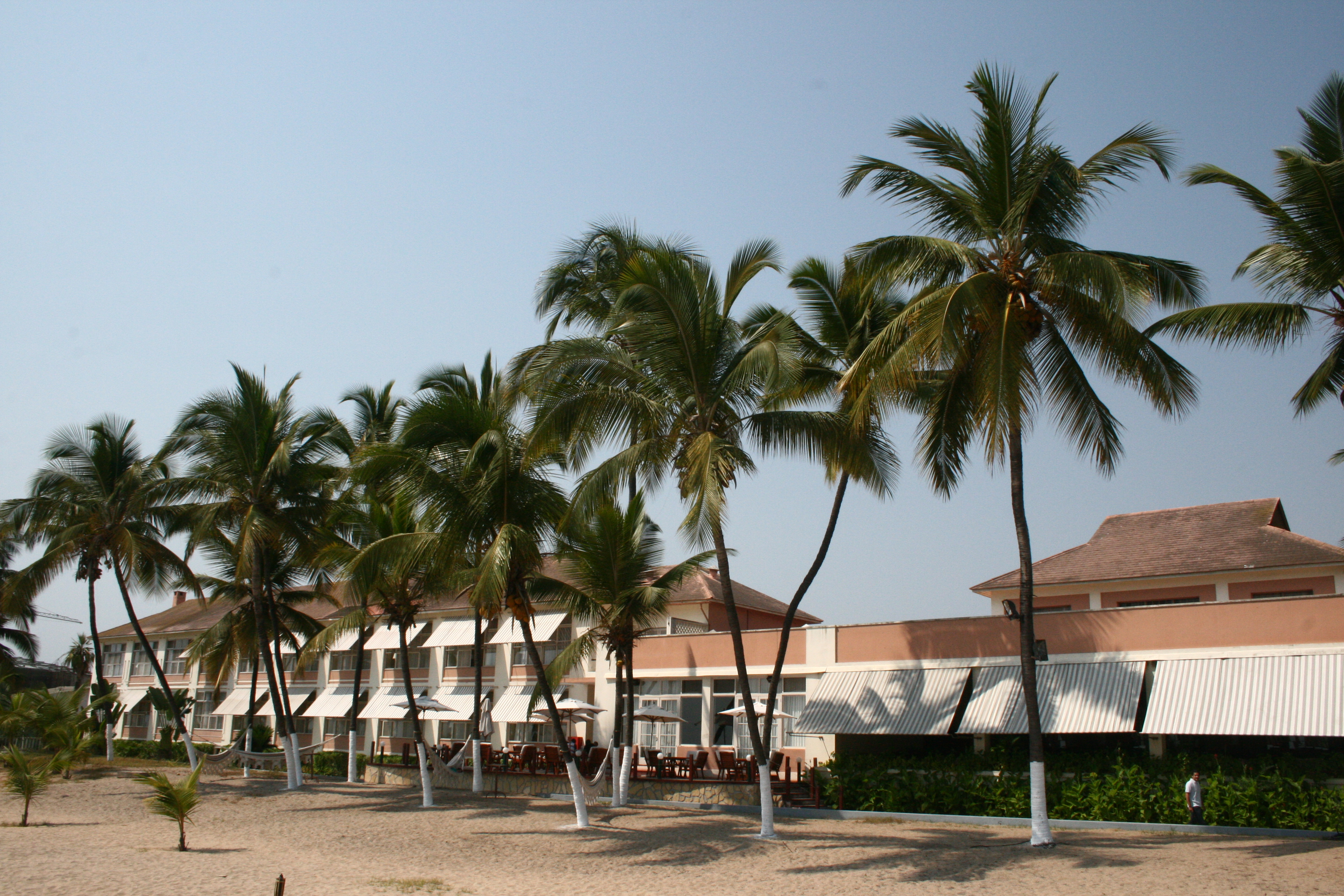
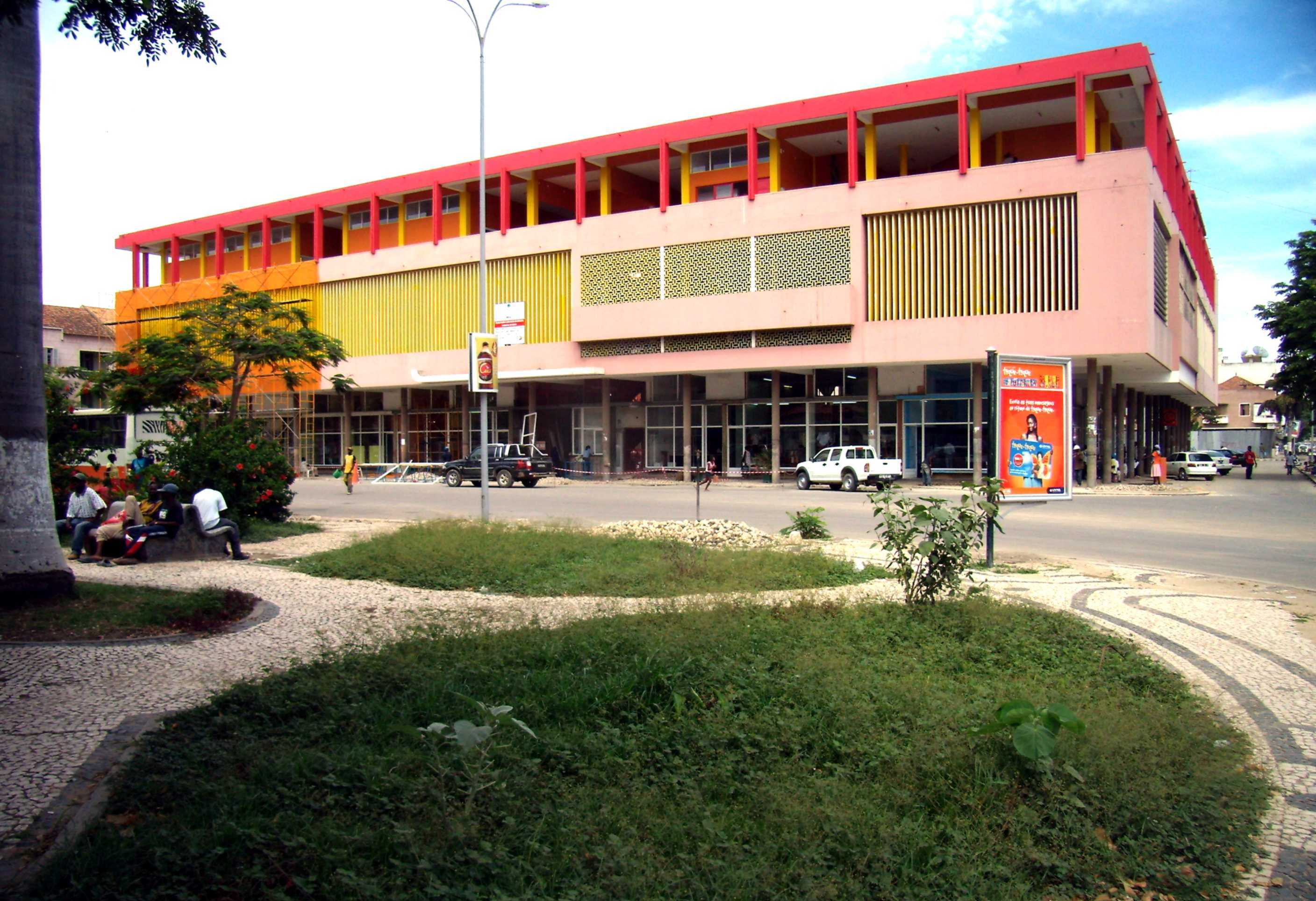

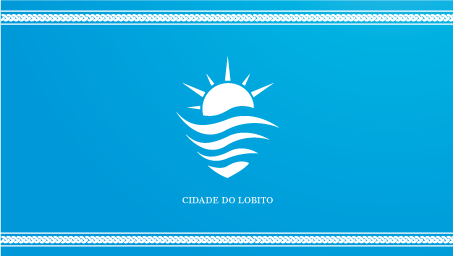
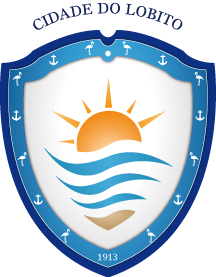
- Flag Seal

- Location in Angola
- Coordinates: 12°21′00″S 13°32′47″E
- Country: Angola
- Province: Benguela Province
- Incorporated: 1843

Area
  - Municipality: 554 km^{2} (214 sq mi)
- Elevation: 139 m (456 ft)

Population (2014 Census)
  - Municipality: 393,079
  - Density: 710/km^{2} (1,840/sq mi)
  - Urban: 357,950
- Time zone: UTC+1 (WAT)
- Climate: BWh

Lobito is a municipality in Angola. It is located in Benguela Province, on the Atlantic Coast north of the Catumbela Estuary. The Lobito municipality had a population of 393,079 in 2014.

== History ==
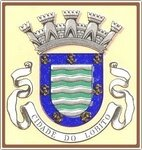
Coat of arms of Lobito during the Portuguese colonial period.

The city was founded in 1843 and owes its existence to the bay of the same name having been chosen as the sea terminus of the Benguela railway to the far interior, passing through Luau to Katanga in the Democratic Republic of the Congo. The city is located on the coast of the Atlantic Ocean. The population of the municipality is 393,079 (2014) in an area of 3,648 km^{2}. The municipality consists of the communes Canjala, Egipto Praia and Lobito.

=== Portuguese rule ===
Lobito, was built on a sandspit and reclaimed land, with one of Africa's finest natural harbours, protected by a 5 km long sandspit. The old municipality (concelho) was created in 1843 by the Portuguese administration. The town was also founded in 1843 by order of Maria II of Portugal, and its harbour works were begun in 1903.

It wasn't until 1843 that Maria II of Portugal approved the foundation of the town, which had by then been known as Catumbela das Ostras (Catumbela of Oysters)

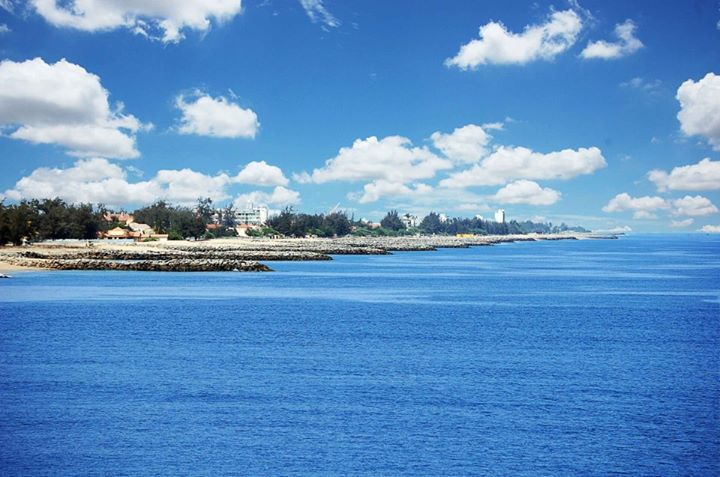
Lobito coast.

Large developments, however, were not stimulated until the completion in 1928 of the important Benguela Railway, which connected Portuguese Angola with the Belgian Congo.

Under Portuguese rule, the port was one of Angola's busiest, and the busiest of Africa, exporting agricultural produce from the interior and handling transit trade from the mines of southeastern Belgian Congo and of Northern Rhodesia. Fishing, tourism and services were also important. The carnival in Lobito was also one of the most renowned and popular in Portuguese Angola.

=== Post-independence ===
After the 25 April 1974 Carnation Revolution in Lisbon, Angola was offered independence. Lobito's port activities were highly limited by disruptions to railway transit and high insecurity during the Angolan Civil War (1975–2002). With peace and stability, in the 2000s, Lobito started the process of reconstruction and resumed its path to development.

== Climate ==
Lobito experiences a mild tropical arid climate with few temperature extremes. The winters are extremely dry and warm, while summers are relatively wet and hotter.

Climate data for Lobito
Month	Jan	Feb	Mar	Apr	May	Jun	Jul	Aug	Sep	Oct	Nov	Dec	Year
Record high °C (°F)	35.0 (95.0)	35.0 (95.0)	34.4 (93.9)	35.6 (96.1)	33.3 (91.9)	33.3 (91.9)	28.9 (84.0)	29.4 (84.9)	28.3 (82.9)	30.6 (87.1)	33.9 (93.0)	32.8 (91.0)	35.6 (96.1)
Mean daily maximum °C (°F)	28.3 (82.9)	29.4 (84.9)	30.6 (87.1)	30.0 (86.0)	28.3 (82.9)	25.6 (78.1)	23.3 (73.9)	23.3 (73.9)	24.4 (75.9)	26.1 (79.0)	28.3 (82.9)	28.3 (82.9)	27.2 (81.0)
Daily mean °C (°F)	25.3 (77.5)	26.4 (79.5)	27.2 (81.0)	27.0 (80.6)	25.0 (77.0)	22.2 (72.0)	20.3 (68.5)	20.0 (68.0)	21.4 (70.5)	23.3 (73.9)	25.3 (77.5)	25.3 (77.5)	24.1 (75.4)
Mean daily minimum °C (°F)	22.2 (72.0)	23.3 (73.9)	23.9 (75.0)	23.9 (75.0)	21.6 (70.9)	18.9 (66.0)	17.2 (63.0)	16.7 (62.1)	18.3 (64.9)	20.6 (69.1)	22.2 (72.0)	22.2 (72.0)	20.9 (69.6)
Record low °C (°F)	13.3 (55.9)	16.1 (61.0)	18.9 (66.0)	18.3 (64.9)	13.9 (57.0)	12.8 (55.0)	10.6 (51.1)	11.7 (53.1)	12.8 (55.0)	13.9 (57.0)	16.1 (61.0)	17.2 (63.0)	10.6 (51.1)
Average precipitation mm (inches)	20.3 (0.80)	38.1 (1.50)	119.4 (4.70)	53.3 (2.10)	2.5 (0.10)	0.0 (0.0)	0.0 (0.0)	1.3 (0.05)	2.5 (0.10)	30.5 (1.20)	25.4 (1.00)	61.0 (2.40)	354.0 (13.94)
Source: Sistema de Clasificación Bioclimática Mundial

== Transportation ==
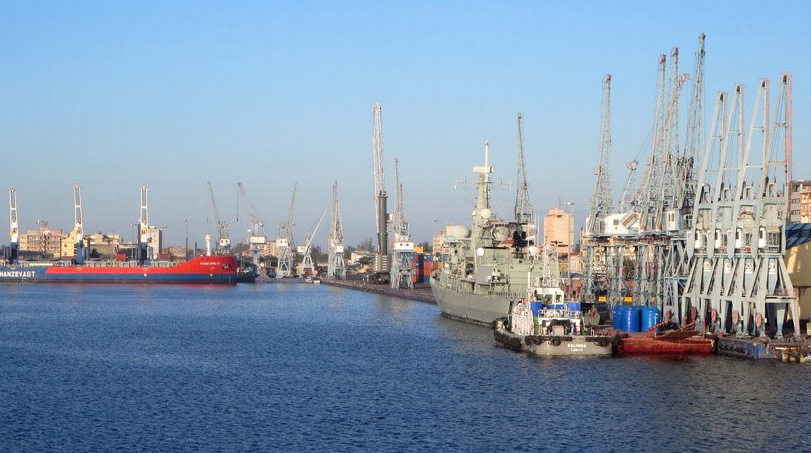
Port of Lobito.

Lobito is the terminus of the Benguela Railway.

=== Port ===
The Port of Lobito is located in Lobito Bay on a sandspit approximately 4.8 km long. The port is administered by the Empresa Portuaria do Lobito. The Port of Lobito handles 2,000,000 tonnes of cargo and 370 ships annually, and along with economic development in the Benguala region, port facilities are under expansion.

=== Airports ===
Lobito does not have its own airport. The city is located 13 kilometres (8.1 mi) from Catumbela Airport and 33 kilometres (21 mi) from Benguela Airport.

== International relations ==
Lobito is twinned with:

- Sintra, Portugal
- Lowell, Massachusetts, United States

== Notable people ==
- António Tavares (born 1960) – author and journalist
- Baptista Miranda (born 2002) – Angolan YouTuber
