= Orochinho =

Brazilian YouTuber and streamer

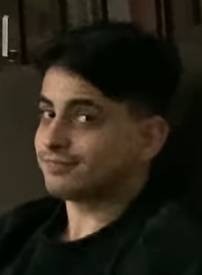
- Orochinho in 2022
- Born: Pedro Henrique Magalhães Frade; 8 June 2000 (age 25); Maringá, Brazil
- Years active: 2013–present

YouTube information
- Channels: Orochinho; orochidois; Tio Orochi
- Subscribers: 4.56 million (Orochinho); 2.26 million (orochidois); 2.41 million (Tio Orochi)
- Views: 807 million (Orochinho); 694 million (orochidois); 225 million (Tio Orochi)
- Last updated: April 23, 2026

Pedro Henrique Magalhães Frade (Maringá, June 8, 2000), known professionally as Orochinho, is a Brazilian streamer and YouTuber, known for his reaction content. He is an influential Twitch streamer in Brazil.

== Career ==
Initially, Orochinho became known for producing content about anime with a humorous approach, as well as videos reacting to games and anime. In June 2019, he participated in a video with Luba. In April 2020, he entered a controversy by stating that the members of the group BTS suffered from bulimia. Due to repeated complaints, his Twitter account was suspended. On August 5, he was banned from Twitch for accidentally showing an image containing nudity received from another user.

In 2023, Orochinho started a channel with his best friend Doazin called Manikomio, where they test drinks, food, and other games. He also became known for refusing a 900,000 reais offer to promote the gambling game Blaze.com. After a scandal involving the site, several newspapers covered the story.

In 2026, he was sentenced to pay R$70,000 in damages to the mother of a baby who had become a meme. According to the woman, the YouTuber humiliated her daughter in a video published on his channel. Orochinho's defense claimed that he was unaware of the lawsuit, and that he will try to have the sentence overturned in order to defend himself.

Orochinho is one of the influences of YouTuber Baptista Miranda, one of the largest influencers in Angola, and is partially responsible for his popularity.
