= Land tenure in Angola =

The system of land tenure in Angola was addressed by the 2004 land act. While the land act is a crucial step towards normalization of land ownership in post-war Angola, some problems such as competing land claims, land grabbing and the unresolved status of customary land tenure persist.

== The 2004 land reform ==
The recent land reform in Angola took place after the Angolan Civil War had ended in 2002. After two years of preparation, the land law (Lei de Terras de Angola) was passed on 18 December 2004. Amongst others, this law included a formal possibility of transforming customary land rights into legal rights. During the civil war, a clear system of land rights was largely absent, so it was one of the most urgent tasks to have them re-establish in the immediate post-war time. Access and entitlement to land were seen as a key point in the Angolan recovery process. This is especially relevant as two thirds of Angolans work in agriculture and are thus directly dependent on land rights. One of the main tasks of the new land laws was to protect people from evictions, which had frequently taken place during the colonial period as well as during the civil war, largely due to unclear land rights. Nevertheless, some people doubt whether the land reform has been able to fully address the challenges, which is seen by some as related to the insufficient overall accountability of Angola’s government.

== Challenges for land issues ==
It is estimated that the Angolan Civil War resulted in a total of 4.1 million internally displaced persons (IDPs). This posed a major problem of land distribution, because it led to a situation in which often competing land claims existed between IDPs who relocated to the land during the conflict, and others who had owned the land in the pre-war period. Another challenge to land rights is constituted by land grabbing. This process set in during the last years of the war, as big areas of fertile land, which had once been the territory of pastoralists and their herds, were grabbed by a new wealthy class of land owners, which were often either connected to or part of the government In the recent years, several additional deals between multinational corporations or foreign governments and the Angolan government have been agreed on. Even now, most of the land in Angola is still owned by 'custom', which means that people have no documents to prove that they own the land. As the situation of customary land tenure is still very ambiguous, those who claim their land on the basis of customary law are vulnerable to arbitrary actions perpetrated by the state. Amongst others, this situation led to numerous forced evictions, particularly in the capital city Luanda.
